= Atomic bombings of Hiroshima and Nagasaki =

1945 attacks in Japan during WWII

- Part of the Pacific Theatre of World War II
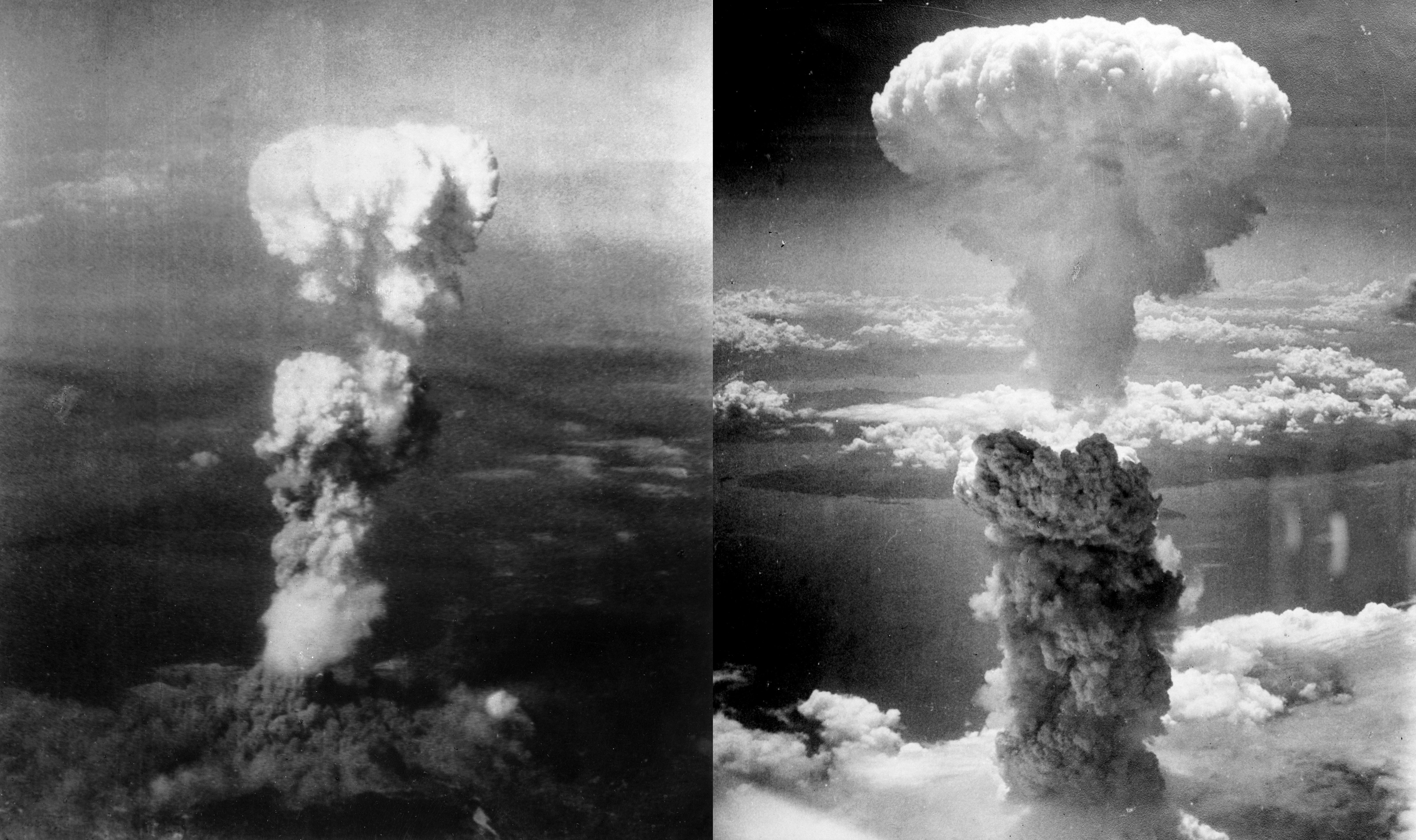
- Atomic bomb mushroom clouds over Hiroshima (left) and Nagasaki (right)
- Type: Nuclear bombing
- Location: Hiroshima and Nagasaki, Japan: 34°23′41″N 132°27′17″E; 32°46′25″N 129°51′48″E
- Commanded by: William S. Parsons; Paul Tibbets; Robert A. Lewis; Charles Sweeney; Frederick Ashworth
- Date: 6 and 9 August 1945; 81 years ago
- Executed by: United States: Manhattan Project; 509th Composite Group
- Casualties: Hiroshima: 90,000–166,000 killed; 80,000–156,000 civilians; 10,000 soldiers; 12 Allied prisoners of war; Nagasaki: 60,000–80,000 killed; 60,000–80,000 civilians; 150 soldiers; 8–13 Allied prisoners of war; Total killed (by end of 1945): 150,000–246,000

On 6 and 9 August 1945, the United States detonated two atomic bombs over the Japanese cities of Hiroshima and Nagasaki, respectively, during the final days of World War II. The aerial bombings killed 150,000 to 246,000 people, most of whom were civilians, and remain the first and only uses of nuclear weapons in an armed conflict.

In the final year of World War II, the Allies prepared for a costly invasion of the Japanese mainland. This undertaking was preceded by a conventional bombing and firebombing campaign that devastated 64 Japanese cities, including an operation on Tokyo. The war in Europe concluded when Germany surrendered on 8 May 1945, and the Allies turned their full attention to the Pacific War. By July 1945, the Allies' Manhattan Project had produced two types of atomic bombs: "Little Boy", an enriched uranium gun-type fission weapon, and "Fat Man", a plutonium implosion-type nuclear weapon. The 509th Composite Group of the U.S. Army Air Forces was trained and equipped with the specialized Silverplate version of the Boeing B-29 Superfortress, and deployed to Tinian in the Mariana Islands. The Allies called for the unconditional surrender of the Imperial Japanese Armed Forces in the Potsdam Declaration on 26 July 1945, the alternative being "prompt and utter destruction". The Japanese government ignored the ultimatum. Japan announced its surrender to the Allies on 15 August, six days after the bombing of Nagasaki and the Soviet Union's declaration of war against Japan and invasion of Manchuria. The Japanese government signed an instrument of surrender on 2 September, ending the war.

The consent of the United Kingdom was obtained for the bombing, as was required by the Quebec Agreement, and orders were issued on 25 July by General Thomas T. Handy, the acting chief of staff of the U.S. Army, for atomic bombs to be used on Hiroshima, Kokura, Niigata, and Nagasaki. These targets were chosen because they were large urban areas that also held significant military facilities. On 6 August, a Little Boy was dropped on Hiroshima. Three days later, a Fat Man was dropped on Nagasaki. Over the next two to four months, the effects of the atomic bombings killed 90,000 to 166,000 people in Hiroshima and 60,000 to 80,000 people in Nagasaki; roughly half the deaths occurred on the first day. For months afterward, many people continued to die from the effects of burns, radiation sickness, and other injuries, compounded by illness and malnutrition. Despite Hiroshima's sizable military garrison, estimated at 24,000 troops, some 90% of the dead were civilians.

Scholars have extensively studied the effects of the bombings on the social and political character of subsequent world history and popular culture, and there is still much debate concerning the ethical and legal justification for the bombings as well as their ramifications of geopolitics especially with the context of the Cold War. Supporters argue that the atomic bombings were necessary to bring an end to the war with minimal casualties and ultimately prevented a greater loss of life on both sides, and also assert that the demonstration of atomic weaponry created the Long Peace in the interest of preventing a nuclear war. Conversely, critics argue that the bombings were unnecessary for the war's end and were a war crime, raising moral and ethical implications, and also assert that future use of atomic weaponry is more likely than anticipated and could lead to a nuclear holocaust.

== Background ==
=== Atomic bomb development ===
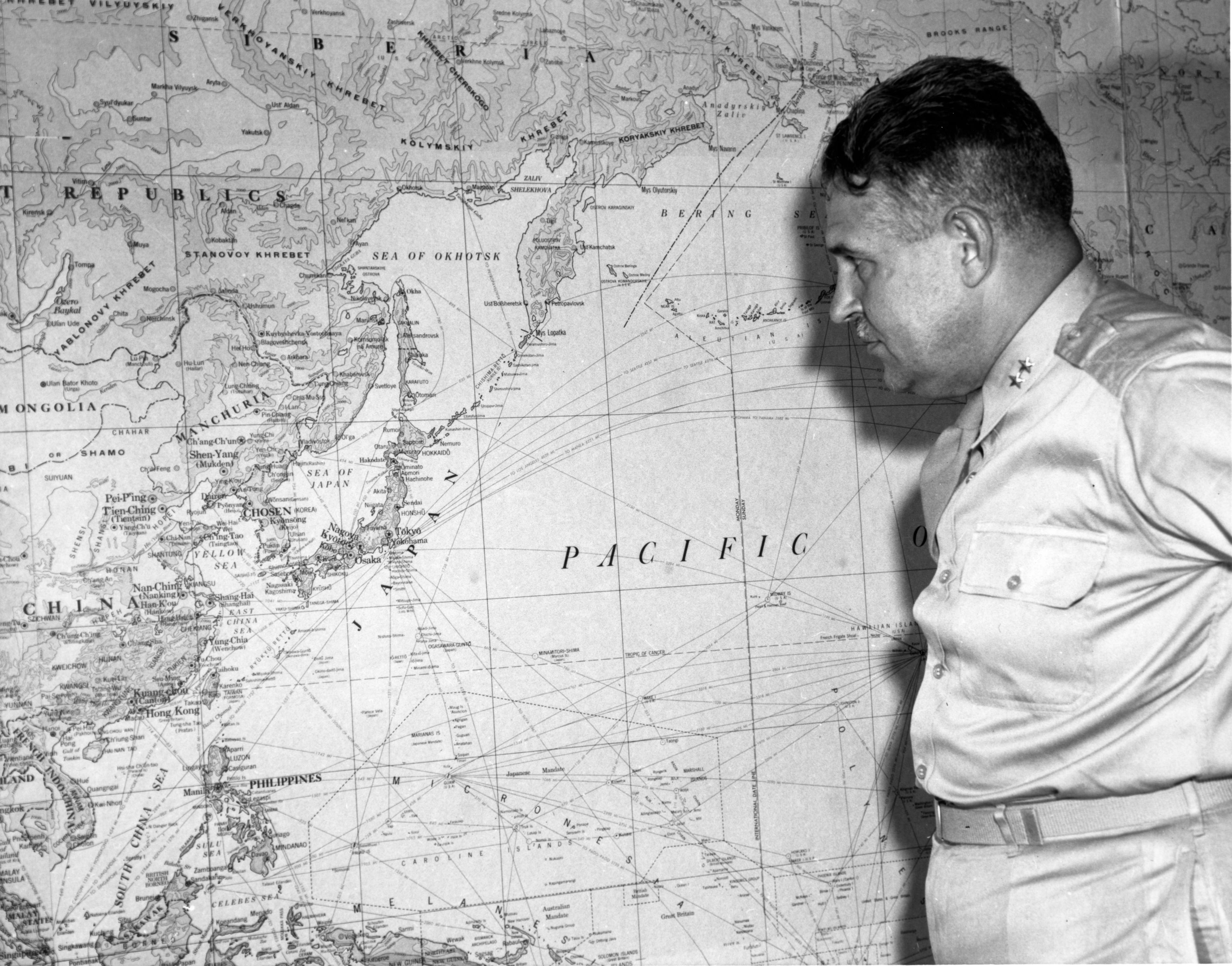
Leslie Groves, Manhattan Project director, with a map of the Far East

The discovery of nuclear fission in 1938 made the development of an atomic bomb a theoretical possibility. Fears that a German nuclear weapons program would develop atomic weapons first, especially among scientists who were refugees from Nazi Germany and other fascist countries, were expressed in the Einstein–Szilard letter to Roosevelt in 1939. This prompted preliminary research in the United States in late 1939. Progress was slow until the arrival of the British MAUD Committee report in late 1941, which indicated that only 5 to 10 kilograms of isotopically-pure uranium-235 were needed for a bomb instead of tons of natural uranium and a neutron moderator like heavy water. Consequently, the work was accelerated, first as a pilot program, and finally in the agreement by Roosevelt to turn the work over to the U.S. Army Corps of Engineers to construct the production facilities necessary to produce uranium-235 and plutonium-239. This work was consolidated within the newly created Manhattan Engineer District, which became better known as the Manhattan Project, eventually under the direction of Major General Leslie R. Groves, Jr..

The work of the Manhattan Project took place at dozens of sites across the United States, and even some outside of its borders. It would ultimately cost over US$2 billion (equivalent to about $28 billion in 2025) and employ over 125,000 people simultaneously at its peak. Groves appointed J. Robert Oppenheimer to organize and head the project's Los Alamos Laboratory in New Mexico, where bomb design work was carried out. Two different types of bombs were eventually developed: a gun-type fission weapon that used uranium-235, called Little Boy, and a more complex implosion-type nuclear weapon that used plutonium-239, called Fat Man.

There was a Japanese nuclear weapon program, but it lacked the human, mineral, and financial resources of the Manhattan Project, and never made much progress towards developing an atomic bomb.

=== Pacific War ===
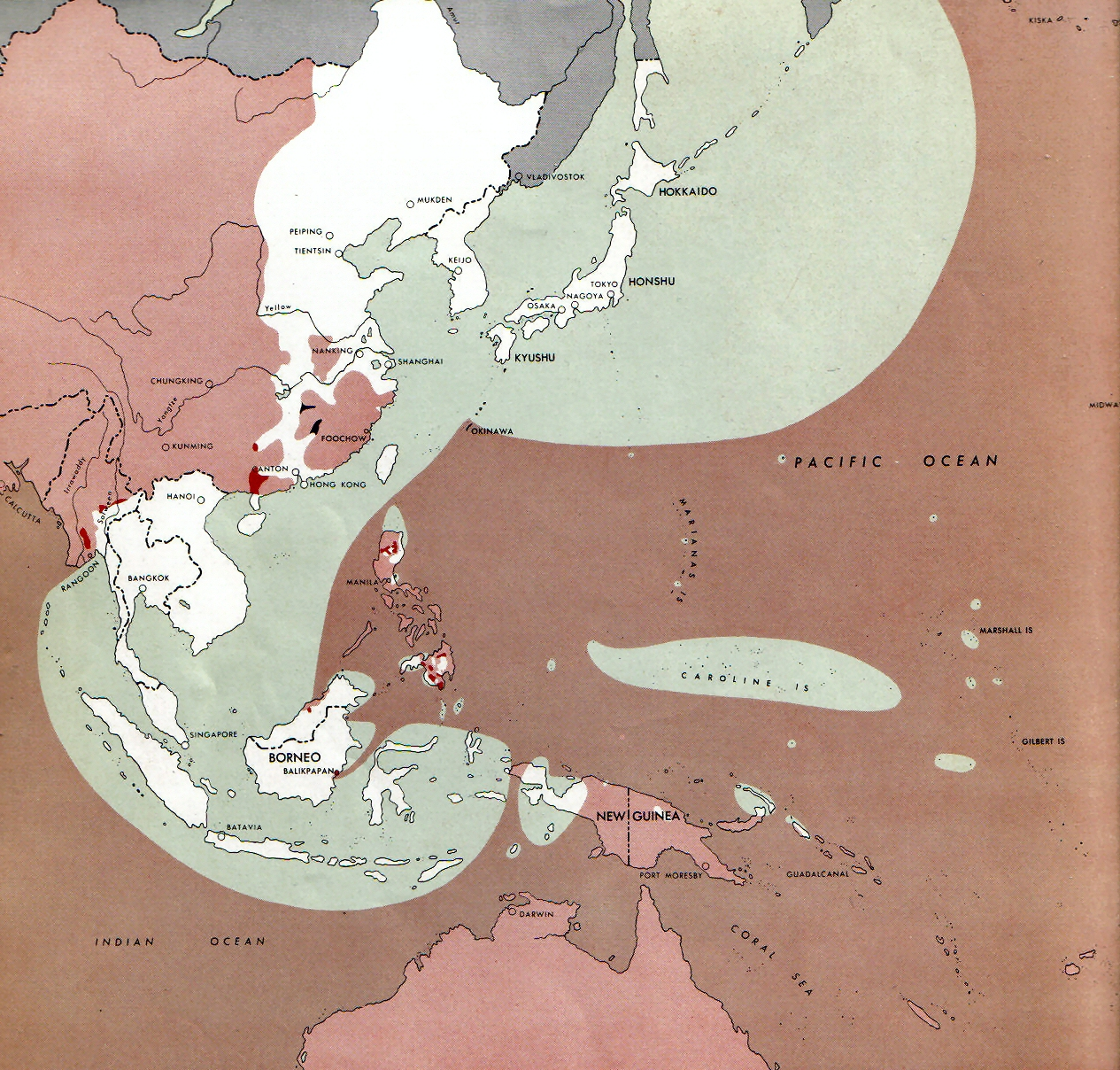
Situation of the Pacific War on 1 August 1945 White and green: Areas controlled by Japan Red: Areas controlled by the Allies Gray: Areas controlled by the Soviet Union (neutral)

In 1945, the Pacific War between the Empire of Japan and the Allies entered its fourth year. Most Japanese military units fought fiercely, ensuring that the Allied victory would come at an enormous cost. The 1.25 million battle casualties incurred in total by the United States in World War II included both military personnel killed in action and wounded in action. Nearly one million of the casualties occurred during the last year of the war, from June 1944 to June 1945. In December 1944, American battle casualties hit an all-time monthly high of 88,000 as a result of the German Ardennes Offensive. Worried by the losses sustained, President Franklin D. Roosevelt suggested the use of atomic bombs on Germany as soon as possible, but was informed the first usable atomic weapons were still months away. America's reserves of manpower were running out. Deferments for groups such as agricultural workers were tightened, and there was consideration of drafting women. At the same time, the public was becoming war-weary, and demanding that long-serving servicemen be sent home.

In the Pacific, the Allies returned to the Philippines, recaptured Burma, and invaded Borneo. Offensives were undertaken to reduce the Japanese forces remaining in Bougainville, New Guinea and the Philippines. In April 1945, American forces landed on Okinawa, where heavy fighting continued until June. Along the way, the ratio of Japanese to American casualties dropped from five to one in the Philippines to two to one on Okinawa. Although some Japanese soldiers were taken prisoner, most fought until they were killed or committed suicide. Nearly 99 percent of the 21,000 defenders of Iwo Jima were killed. Of the 117,000 Okinawan and Japanese troops defending Okinawa in April to June 1945, 94 percent were killed; 7,401 Japanese soldiers surrendered, an unprecedentedly large number.

As the Allies advanced towards Japan, conditions became steadily worse for the Japanese people. Japan's merchant fleet declined from 5,250,000 gross register tons in 1941 to 1,560,000 tons in March 1945, and 557,000 tons in August 1945. The lack of raw materials forced the Japanese war economy into a steep decline after the middle of 1944. The civilian economy, which had slowly deteriorated throughout the war, reached disastrous levels by the middle of 1945. The loss of shipping also affected the fishing fleet, and the 1945 catch was only 22 percent of that in 1941. The 1945 rice harvest was the worst since 1909, and hunger and malnutrition became widespread. U.S. industrial production was overwhelmingly superior to Japan's. By 1943, the U.S. produced almost 100,000 aircraft a year, compared to Japan's production of 70,000 for the entire war. In February 1945, Prince Fumimaro Konoe advised Emperor Hirohito that defeat was inevitable, and urged him to abdicate.

=== Preparations to invade Japan ===
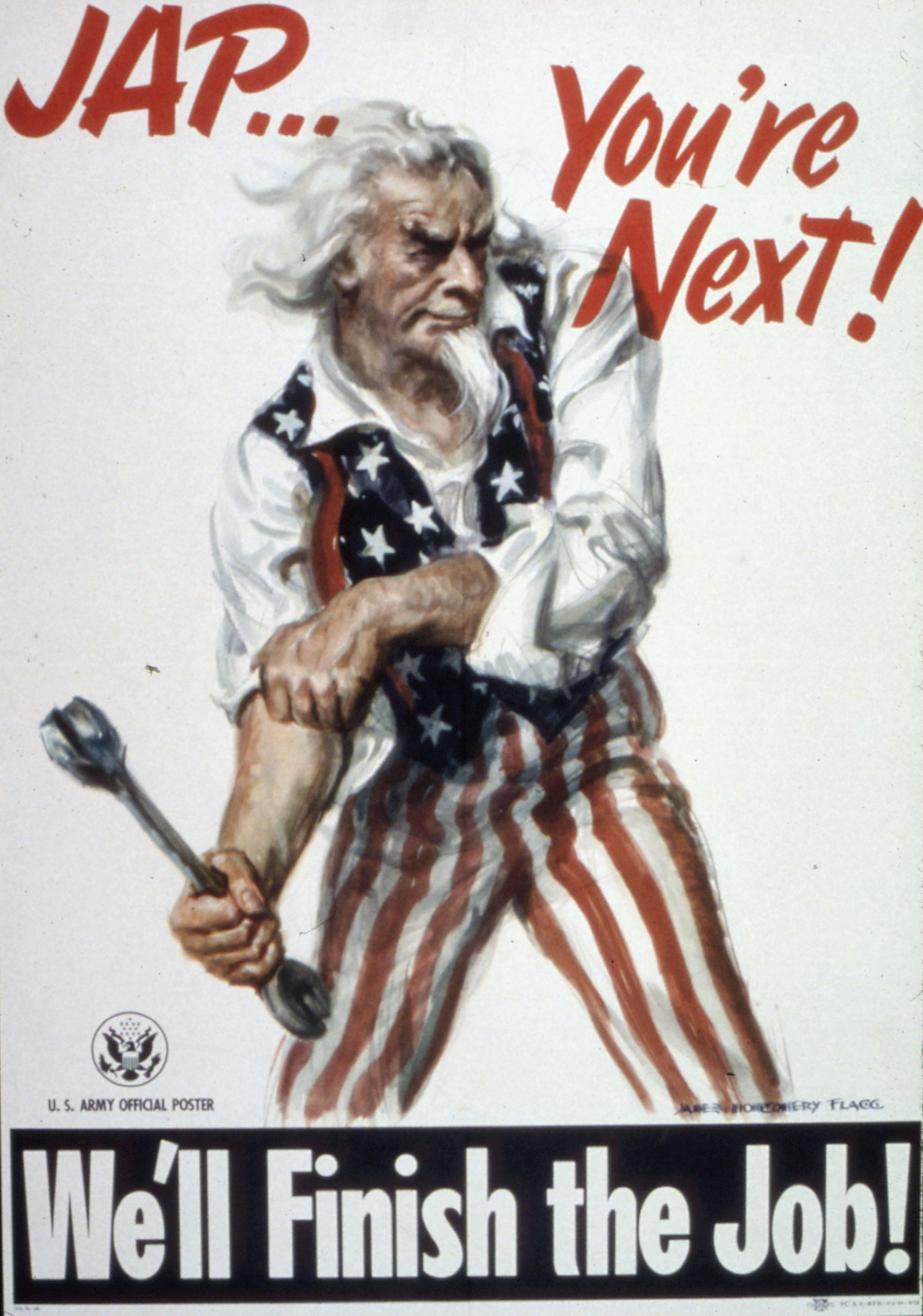
U.S. Army propaganda poster depicting Uncle Sam preparing the public for the invasion of Japan after the end of the war with Germany and Italy

Even before the surrender of Nazi Germany on 8 May 1945, plans were underway for the largest operation of the Pacific War, Operation Downfall, the Allied invasion of Japan. The operation had two parts: set to begin in October 1945, Operation Olympic involved a series of landings by the U.S. Sixth Army intended to capture the southern third of the southernmost main Japanese island, Kyūshū. This was to be followed in March 1946 by Operation Coronet, the capture of the Kantō Plain, near Tokyo on the main Japanese island of Honshu by the U.S. First, Eighth and Tenth Armies, as well as a Commonwealth Corps made up of Australian, British and Canadian divisions. The target date was chosen to allow for Olympic to complete its objectives, for troops to be redeployed from Europe, and the Japanese winter to pass.

Japan's geography made this invasion plan obvious to the Japanese; they were able to predict the Allied invasion plans accurately and thus adjust their defensive plan, Operation Ketsugō, accordingly. The Japanese planned an all-out defense of Kyūshū, with little left in reserve. In all, there were 2.3 million Japanese Army troops prepared to defend the home islands, backed by a civilian militia of 28 million. Casualty predictions varied widely, but were extremely high. The Vice Chief of the Imperial Japanese Navy General Staff, Vice Admiral Takijirō Ōnishi, predicted up to 20 million Japanese deaths.

The Americans were alarmed by the Japanese buildup, which was accurately tracked through Ultra intelligence. On 15 June 1945, a study by the Joint War Plans Committee, drawing on the experience of the Battle of Leyte, estimated that Downfall would result in 132,500 to 220,000 U.S. casualties, with U.S. dead and missing in the range from 27,500 to 50,000. Secretary of War Henry L. Stimson commissioned his own study by Quincy Wright and William Shockley, who estimated the invading Allies would suffer between 1.7 and 4 million casualties, of whom between 400,000 and 800,000 would be dead, while Japanese fatalities would have been around 5 to 10 million. In a meeting with the President and commanders on 18 June 1945, General George C. Marshall stated that "there was reason to believe" casualties for the first 30 days would not exceed the price paid for Luzon. Additionally, with the Japanese position rendered "hopeless" by an invasion of their mainland, Marshall speculated that Soviet entry into the war might be "the decisive action" needed to finally "[leverage] them into capitulation."

Marshall began contemplating the use of a weapon that was "readily available and which assuredly can decrease the cost in American lives:" poison gas. Quantities of phosgene, mustard gas, tear gas and cyanogen chloride were moved to Luzon from stockpiles in Australia and New Guinea in preparation for Operation Olympic, and MacArthur ensured that Chemical Warfare Service units were trained in their use. Consideration was also given to using biological weapons.

=== Air raids on Japan ===
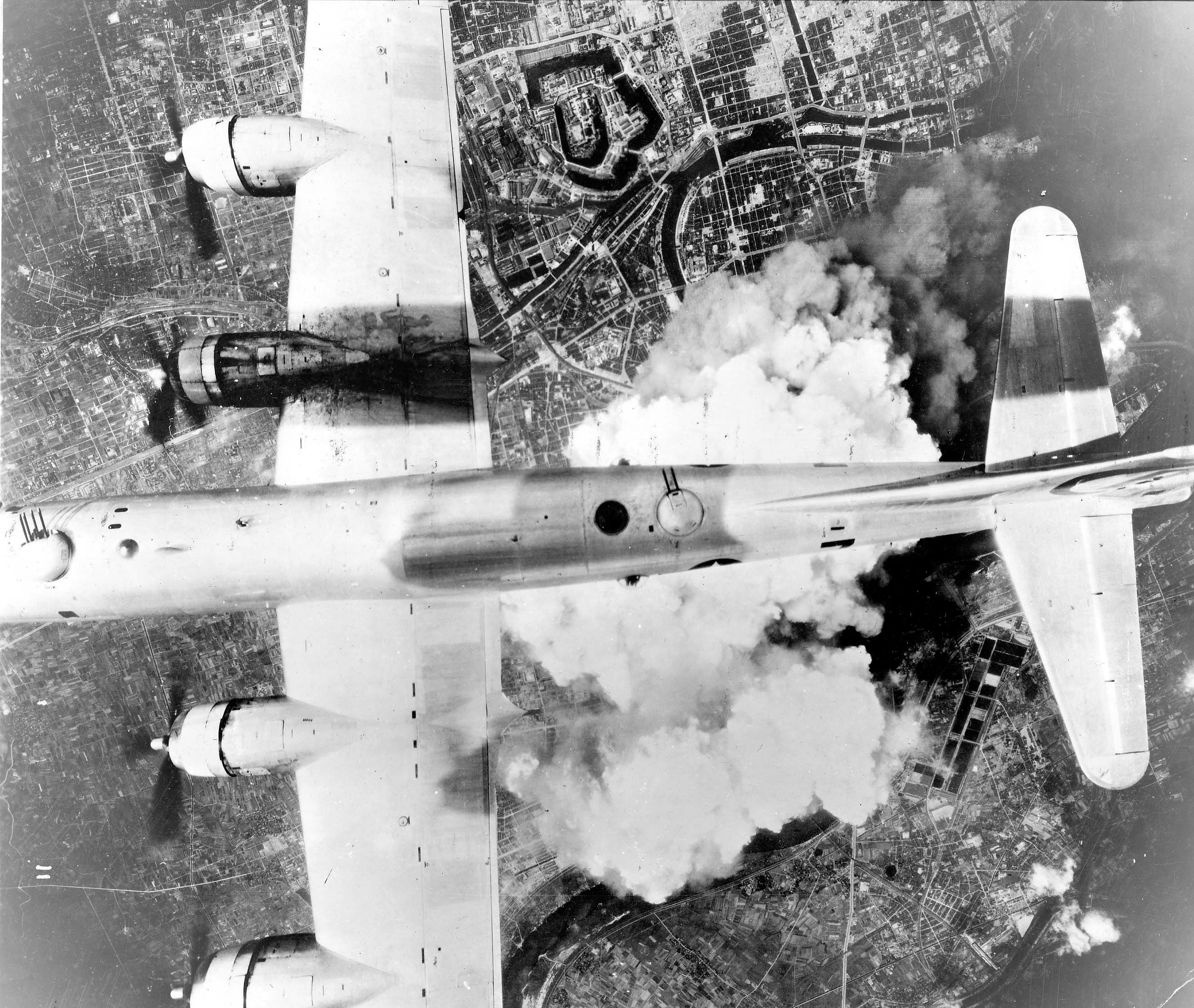
A B-29 over Osaka on 1 June 1945

While the United States had developed plans for an air campaign against Japan prior to the Pacific War, the capture of Allied bases in the western Pacific in the first weeks of the conflict meant that this offensive did not begin until mid-1944 when the long-ranged Boeing B-29 Superfortress became ready for use in combat. Operation Matterhorn involved India-based B-29s staging through bases around Chengdu in China to make a series of raids on strategic targets in Japan. This effort failed to achieve the strategic objectives that its planners had intended, largely because of logistical problems, the bomber's mechanical difficulties, the vulnerability of Chinese staging bases, and the extreme range required to reach key Japanese cities.

Brigadier General Haywood S. Hansell determined that Guam, Tinian, and Saipan in the Mariana Islands would better serve as B-29 bases, but they were in Japanese hands. Strategies were shifted to accommodate the air war, and the islands were captured between June and August 1944. Air bases were developed, and B-29 operations commenced from the Marianas in October 1944. The XXI Bomber Command began missions against Japan on 18 November 1944. The early attempts to bomb Japan from the Marianas proved just as ineffective as the China-based B-29s had been. Hansell continued the practice of conducting so-called high-altitude precision bombing, aimed at key industries and transportation networks, even after these tactics had not produced acceptable results. These efforts proved unsuccessful due to logistical difficulties with the remote location, technical problems with the new and advanced aircraft, unfavorable weather conditions, and enemy action.

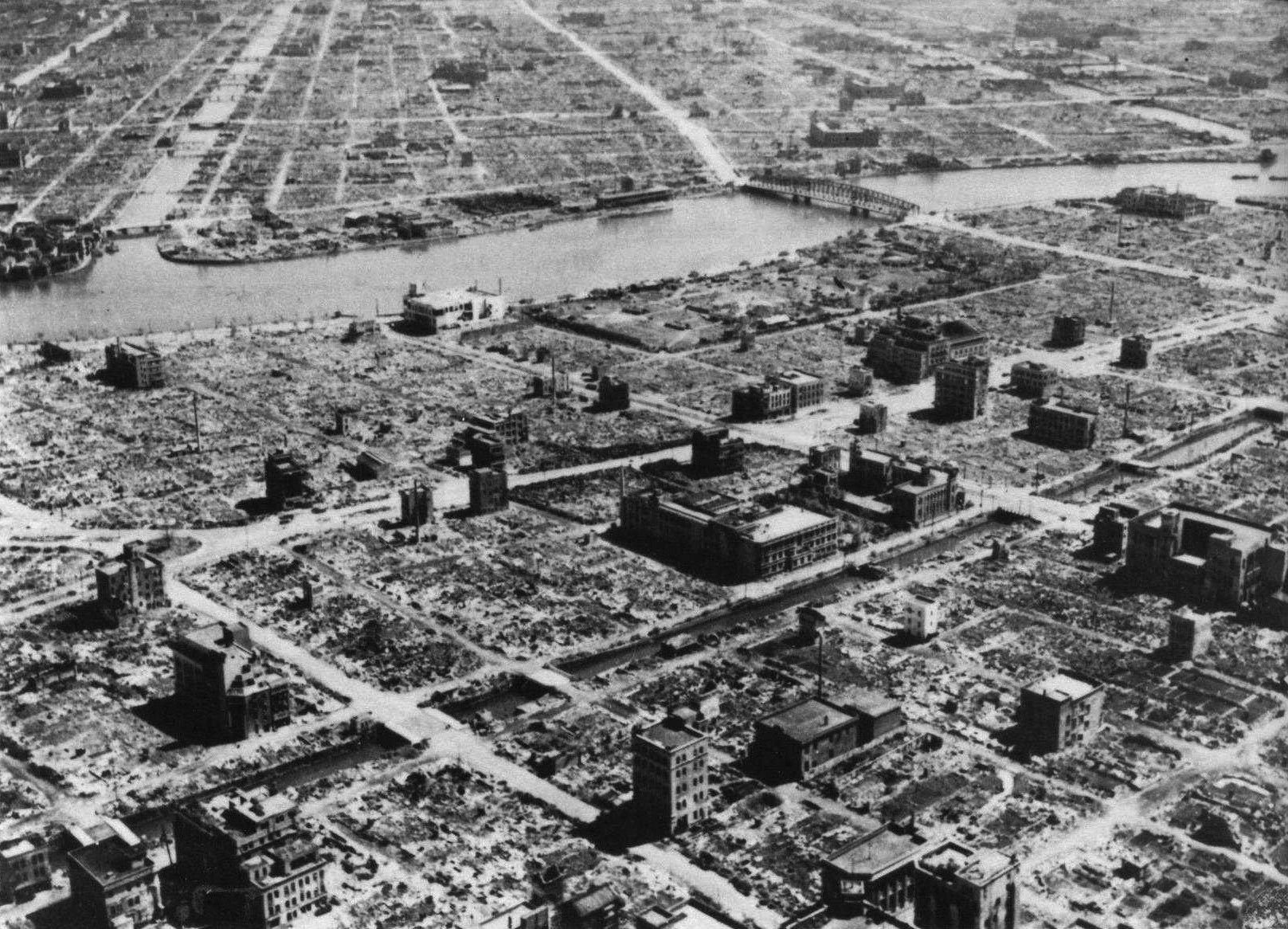
The Operation Meetinghouse firebombing of Tokyo on the night of 9–10 March 1945, was the single deadliest air raid in history, with a greater area of fire damage and loss of life than either of the atomic bombings of Hiroshima or Nagasaki.

Hansell's successor, Major General Curtis LeMay, assumed command in January 1945 and initially continued to use the same precision bombing tactics, with equally unsatisfactory results. The attacks initially targeted key industrial facilities but much of the Japanese manufacturing process was carried out in small workshops and private homes. Under pressure from United States Army Air Forces (USAAF) headquarters in Washington, LeMay changed tactics and decided that low-level incendiary raids against Japanese cities were the only way to destroy their production capabilities, shifting from precision bombing to area bombardment with incendiaries. Like most strategic bombing during World War II, the aim of the air offensive against Japan was to destroy the enemy's war industries, kill or disable civilian employees of these industries, and undermine civilian morale.

Over the next six months, the XXI Bomber Command under LeMay firebombed 64 Japanese cities. The firebombing of Tokyo, codenamed Operation Meetinghouse, on 9–10 March, killed an estimated 100,000 people and destroyed 41 km^{2} (16 sq mi) of the city and 267,000 buildings in a single night. It was the deadliest bombing raid of the war, at a cost of 20 B-29s shot down by flak and fighters. By May, 75 percent of bombs dropped were incendiaries designed to burn down Japan's "paper cities". By mid-June, Japan's six largest cities had been devastated. The end of the fighting on Okinawa that month provided airfields even closer to the Japanese mainland, allowing the bombing campaign to be further escalated. Aircraft flying from Allied aircraft carriers and the Ryukyu Islands also regularly struck targets in Japan during 1945 in preparation for Operation Downfall. Firebombing switched to smaller cities, with populations ranging from 60,000 to 350,000. According to Yuki Tanaka, the U.S. fire-bombed over a hundred Japanese towns and cities.

The Japanese military was unable to stop the Allied attacks, and the country's civil defense preparations proved inadequate. Japanese fighters and anti-aircraft guns had difficulty engaging bombers flying at high altitude. From April 1945, the Japanese interceptors also had to face American fighter escorts based on Iwo Jima and Okinawa. That month, the Imperial Japanese Army Air Service and Imperial Japanese Navy Air Service stopped attempting to intercept the air raids to preserve fighter aircraft to counter the expected invasion. By mid-1945 the Japanese only occasionally scrambled aircraft to intercept individual B-29s conducting reconnaissance sorties over the country, to conserve supplies of fuel. In July 1945, the Japanese had 138 thousand cubic metres (1,156,000 US barrels) of avgas stockpiled for the invasion of Japan. About 72 thousand cubic metres (604,000 US barrels) had been consumed in the home islands area in April, May and June 1945. While the Japanese military decided to resume attacks on Allied bombers from late June, by this time there were too few operational fighters available for this change of tactics to hinder the Allied air raids.

== Preparations ==
=== Organization and training ===
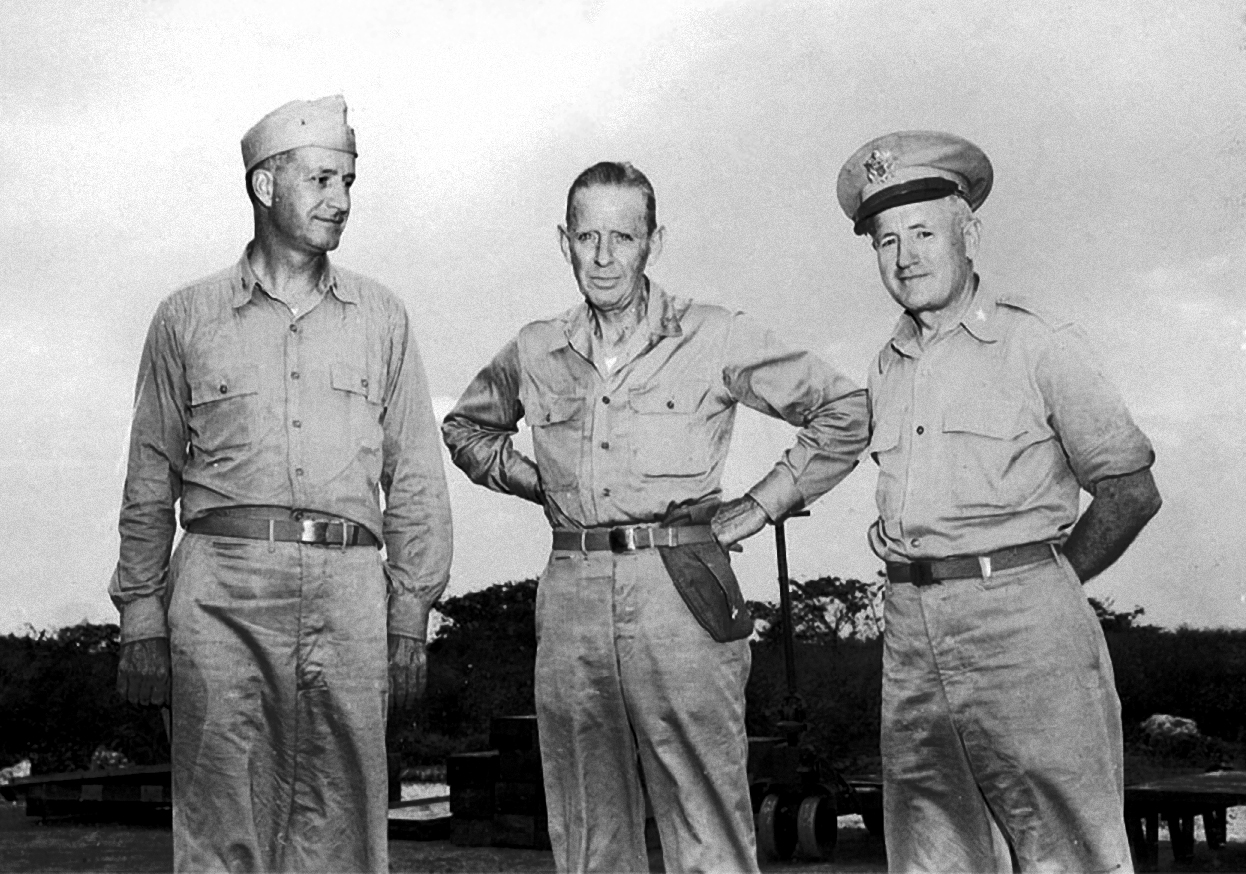
The "Tinian Joint Chiefs": Captain William S. Parsons (left), Rear Admiral William R. Purnell (center), and Brigadier General Thomas F. Farrell (right)

The 509th Composite Group was constituted on 9 December 1944, and activated on 17 December 1944, at Wendover Army Air Field, Utah, commanded by Colonel Paul Tibbets. Tibbets was assigned to organize and command a combat group to develop the means of delivering an atomic weapon against targets in Germany and Japan. Because the flying squadrons of the group consisted of both bomber and transport aircraft, the group was designated as a "composite" rather than a "bombardment" unit. Due to its remoteness, Tibbets selected Wendover for his training base over Great Bend, Kansas and Mountain Home, Idaho. Each bombardier completed at least 50 practice drops of inert or conventional explosive pumpkin bombs, targeting islands around Tinian and later the Japanese home islands, until as late as 14 August 1945. Some of the missions over Japan were flown by single unescorted bombers with a single payload to accustom the Japanese to this pattern. They also simulated actual atomic bombing runs, including the directions of ingress and egress with respect to the wind. Tibbets himself was barred from flying most missions over Japan for fear that he might be captured and interrogated. On 5 April 1945, the code name Operation Centerboard was assigned. The officer responsible for its allocation in the War Department's Operations Division was not cleared to know any details of it. The first bombing was later codenamed Operation Centerboard I, and the second, Operation Centerboard II.

The 509th Composite Group had an authorized strength of 225 officers and 1,542 enlisted men, almost all of whom eventually deployed to Tinian. In addition to its authorized strength, the 509th had attached to it on Tinian 51 civilian and military personnel from Project Alberta, known as the 1st Technical Detachment. The 509th Composite Group's 393rd Bombardment Squadron was equipped with 15 Silverplate B-29s. These aircraft were specially adapted to carry nuclear weapons, and were equipped with fuel-injected engines, Curtiss Electric reversible-pitch propellers, pneumatic actuators for rapid opening and closing of bomb bay doors and other improvements.

The ground support echelon of the 509th Composite Group moved by rail on 26 April 1945, to its port of embarkation at Seattle, Washington. On 6 May the support elements sailed on the SS Cape Victory for the Marianas, while group materiel was shipped on the SS Emile Berliner. The Cape Victory made brief port calls at Honolulu and Eniwetok but the passengers were not permitted to leave the dock area. An advance party of the air echelon, consisting of 29 officers and 61 enlisted men, flew by C-54 to North Field on Tinian, between 15 and 22 May. There were also two representatives from Washington, D.C., Brigadier General Thomas Farrell, the deputy commander of the Manhattan Project, and Rear Admiral William R. Purnell of the Military Policy Committee, who were on hand to decide higher policy matters on the spot. Along with Captain William S. Parsons, the commander of Project Alberta, they became known as the "Tinian Joint Chiefs".

=== Choice of targets ===
The mission runs of 6 and 9 August, with Hiroshima, Nagasaki, and Kokura (the original target for 9 August) displayed

In April 1945, Marshall asked Groves to nominate specific targets for bombing for final approval by himself and Stimson. Groves formed a Target Committee, chaired by himself, that included Farrell, Major John A. Derry, Colonel William P. Fisher, Joyce C. Stearns and David M. Dennison from the USAAF; and scientists John von Neumann, Robert R. Wilson and William Penney from the Manhattan Project. The Target Committee met in Washington on 27 April; at Los Alamos on 10 May, where it was able to talk to the scientists and technicians there; and finally in Washington on 28 May, where it was briefed by Tibbets and Commander Frederick Ashworth from Project Alberta, and the Manhattan Project's scientific advisor, Richard C. Tolman.

The Target Committee nominated five targets: Kokura (now Kitakyushu), the site of one of Japan's largest munitions plants; Hiroshima, an embarkation port and industrial center that was the site of a major military headquarters; Yokohama, an urban center for aircraft manufacture, machine tools, docks, electrical equipment, and oil refineries; Niigata, a port with industrial facilities including steel and aluminum plants and an oil refinery; and Kyoto, a major industrial center. The target selection was subject to the following criteria:

- The target was larger than 4.8 km (3 mi) in diameter and was an important target in a large city.
- The blast wave would create effective damage.
- The target was unlikely to be attacked by August 1945.

These cities were largely untouched during the nightly bombing raids, and the Army Air Forces agreed to leave them off the target list so accurate assessment of the damage caused by the atomic bombs could be made. Hiroshima was described as "an important army depot and port of embarkation in the middle of an urban industrial area. It is a good radar target and it is such a size that a large part of the city could be extensively damaged. There are adjacent hills which are likely to produce a focusing effect which would considerably increase the blast damage. Due to rivers it is not a good incendiary target."

The Target Committee stated that "It was agreed that psychological factors in the target selection were of great importance. Two aspects of this are (1) obtaining the greatest psychological effect against Japan and (2) making the initial use sufficiently spectacular for the importance of the weapon to be internationally recognized when publicity on it is released. ... Kyoto has the advantage of the people being more highly intelligent and hence better able to appreciate the significance of the weapon. Hiroshima has the advantage of being such a size and with possible focussing from nearby mountains that a large fraction of the city may be destroyed. The Emperor's palace in Tokyo has a greater fame than any other target but is of least strategic value."

Edwin O. Reischauer, a Japan expert for the U.S. Army Intelligence Service, was incorrectly said to have prevented the bombing of Kyoto. In his autobiography, Reischauer specifically refuted this claim:

... the only person deserving credit for saving Kyoto from destruction is Henry L. Stimson, the Secretary of War at the time, who had known and admired Kyoto ever since his honeymoon there several decades earlier.

Extant sources show that while Stimson was personally familiar with Kyoto, this was the result of a visit decades after his marriage when he was governor-general of the Philippines, not because he honeymooned there. On 30 May, Stimson asked Groves to remove Kyoto from the target list due to its historical, religious and cultural significance, but Groves pointed to its military and industrial significance. Stimson then approached President Harry S. Truman about the matter. Truman agreed with Stimson, and Kyoto was temporarily removed from the target list. Groves attempted to restore Kyoto to the target list in July, but Stimson remained adamant. On 25 July, Nagasaki was put on the target list in place of Kyoto. It was a major military port, one of Japan's largest shipbuilding and repair centers, and an important producer of naval ordnance.

=== Proposed demonstration ===
In early May 1945, the Interim Committee was created by Stimson at the urging of leaders of the Manhattan Project and with the approval of Truman to advise on matters pertaining to nuclear technology. They agreed that the atomic bomb was to be used (1) against Japan at the earliest opportunity, (2) without special warning, and (3) on a "dual target" of military installation surrounded by other buildings susceptible to damage.

During the meetings on 31 May and 1 June, scientist Ernest Lawrence had suggested giving the Japanese a non-combat demonstration. Arthur Compton later recalled that:

It was evident that everyone would suspect trickery. If a bomb were exploded in Japan with previous notice, the Japanese air power was still adequate to give serious interference. An atomic bomb was an intricate device, still in the developmental stage. Its operation would be far from routine. If during the final adjustments of the bomb the Japanese defenders should attack, a faulty move might easily result in some kind of failure. Such an end to an advertised demonstration of power would be much worse than if the attempt had not been made. It was now evident that when the time came for the bombs to be used we should have only one of them available, followed afterwards by others at all-too-long intervals. We could not afford the chance that one of them might be a dud. If the test were made on some neutral territory, it was hard to believe that Japan's determined and fanatical military men would be impressed. If such an open test were made first and failed to bring surrender, the chance would be gone to give the shock of surprise that proved so effective. On the contrary, it would make the Japanese ready to interfere with an atomic attack if they could. Though the possibility of a demonstration that would not destroy human lives was attractive, no one could suggest a way in which it could be made so convincing that it would be likely to stop the war.

The possibility of a demonstration was raised again in the Franck Report issued by physicist James Franck on 11 June and the Scientific Advisory Panel rejected his report on 16 June, saying that "we can propose no technical demonstration likely to bring an end to the war; we see no acceptable alternative to direct military use." Franck then took the report to Washington, D.C., where the Interim Committee met on 21 June to re-examine its earlier conclusions; but it reaffirmed that there was no alternative to the use of the bomb on a military target.

Like Compton, many U.S. officials and scientists argued that a demonstration would sacrifice the shock value of the atomic attack, and the Japanese could deny the atomic bomb was lethal, making the mission less likely to produce surrender. Allied prisoners of war might be moved to the demonstration site and be killed by the bomb. They also worried that the bomb might be a failure, as the Trinity test was that of a stationary device, not an air-dropped bomb. In addition, although more bombs were in production, only two would be available at the start of August, and they cost billions of dollars, so using one for a demonstration would be expensive.

=== Leaflets ===
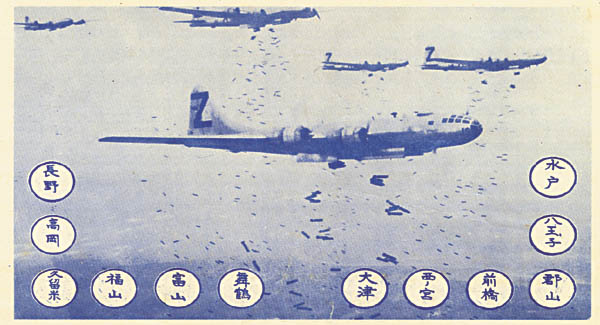
Various leaflets were dropped on Japan listing cities targeted for destruction by firebombing. The other side stated that other cities may be attacked.

For several months, the U.S. had warned civilians of potential air raids by dropping more than 63 million leaflets across Japan. Many Japanese cities suffered terrible damage from aerial bombings; some were as much as 97 percent destroyed. LeMay thought that leaflets would increase the psychological impact of bombing, and reduce the international stigma of area-bombing cities. Even with the warnings, Japanese opposition to the war remained ineffective. In general, the Japanese regarded the leaflet messages as truthful, with many Japanese choosing to leave major cities. The leaflets caused such concern that the government ordered the arrest of anyone caught in possession of a leaflet. Leaflet texts were prepared by recent Japanese prisoners of war because they were thought to be the best choice "to appeal to their compatriots".

In preparation for dropping an atomic bomb on Hiroshima, the Oppenheimer-led Scientific Panel of the Interim Committee decided against a demonstration bomb and against a special leaflet warning. Those decisions were implemented because of the uncertainty of a successful detonation and also because of the wish to maximize shock in the leadership. No warning was given to Hiroshima that a new and much more destructive bomb was going to be dropped. Various sources gave conflicting information about when the last leaflets were dropped on Hiroshima prior to the atomic bomb. Robert Jay Lifton wrote that it was 27 July, and Theodore H. McNelly wrote that it was 30 July. The USAAF history noted that eleven cities were targeted with leaflets on 27 July, but Hiroshima was not one of them, and there were no leaflet sorties on 30 July. Leaflet sorties were undertaken on 1 and 4 August. Hiroshima may have been leafleted in late July or early August, as survivor accounts talk about a delivery of leaflets a few days before the atomic bomb was dropped. Three versions were printed of a leaflet listing 11 or 12 cities targeted for firebombing; a total of 33 cities listed. With the text of this leaflet reading in Japanese "... we cannot promise that only these cities will be among those attacked ..." Hiroshima was not listed.

=== Consultation with Britain and Canada ===
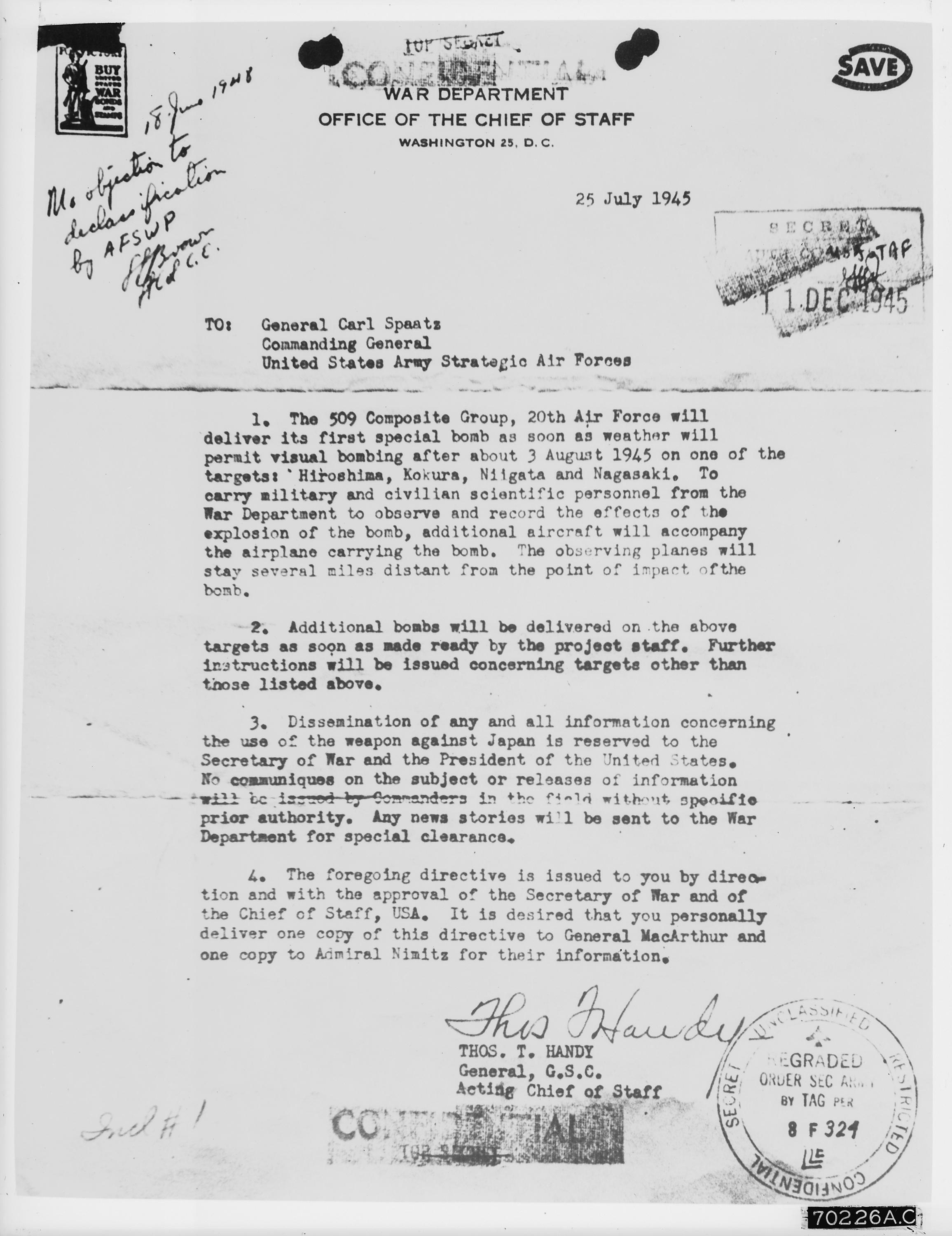
General Thomas Handy's order to General Carl Spaatz ordering the dropping of the atomic bombs

In 1943, the United States and the United Kingdom signed the Quebec Agreement, which stipulated that nuclear weapons would not be used against another country without mutual consent. Stimson therefore had to obtain British permission. A meeting of the Combined Policy Committee, which included one Canadian representative, was held at the Pentagon on 4 July 1945. Field Marshal Sir Henry Maitland Wilson announced that the British government concurred with the use of nuclear weapons against Japan, which would be officially recorded as a decision of the Combined Policy Committee. As the release of information to third parties was also controlled by the Quebec Agreement, discussion then turned to what scientific details would be revealed in the press announcement of the bombing. The meeting also considered what Truman could reveal to Joseph Stalin, the leader of the Soviet Union, at the upcoming Potsdam Conference, as this also required British concurrence.

Orders for the attack were issued to General Carl Spaatz on 25 July under the signature of General Thomas T. Handy, the acting chief of staff, since Marshall was at the Potsdam Conference with Truman. It read in part:

# The 509th Composite Group, 20th Air Force will deliver its first special bomb as soon as weather will permit visual bombing after about 3 August 1945 on one of the targets: Hiroshima, Kokura, Niigata and Nagasaki. To carry military and civilian scientific personnel from the War Department to observe and record the effects of the explosion of the bomb, additional aircraft will accompany the airplane carrying the bomb. The observing planes will stay several miles distant from the point of impact of the bomb.

1. Additional bombs will be delivered on the above targets as soon as made ready by the project staff. Further instructions will be issued concerning targets other than those listed above.

That day, Truman noted in his diary that:

This weapon is to be used against Japan between now and August 10th. I have told the Sec. of War, Mr. Stimson, to use it so that military objectives and soldiers and sailors are the target and not women and children. Even if the Japs are savages, ruthless, merciless and fanatic, we as the leader of the world for the common welfare cannot drop that terrible bomb on the old capital [Kyoto] or the new [Tokyo]. He and I are in accord. The target will be a purely military one.

=== Potsdam Declaration ===
The 16 July success of the Trinity Test in the New Mexico desert exceeded expectations. On 26 July, Allied leaders issued the Potsdam Declaration, which outlined the terms of surrender for Japan. The declaration was presented as an ultimatum and stated that without a surrender, the Allies would destroy Japan, resulting in "the inevitable and complete destruction of the Japanese armed forces and just as inevitably the utter devastation of the Japanese homeland". The atomic bomb was not mentioned in the communiqué.

On 28 July, Japanese papers reported that the declaration had been rejected by the Japanese government. That afternoon, Prime Minister Kantarō Suzuki declared at a press conference that the Potsdam Declaration was no more than a rehash (yakinaoshi) of the Cairo Declaration, that the government intended to ignore it (mokusatsu, "kill by silence"), and that Japan would fight to the end. The statement was taken by both Japanese and foreign papers as a clear rejection of the declaration. Emperor Hirohito, who was waiting for a Soviet reply to non-committal Japanese peace feelers, made no move to change the government position. Japan's willingness to surrender remained conditional on the preservation of the kokutai (Imperial institution and national polity), assumption by the Imperial Headquarters of responsibility for disarmament and demobilization, no occupation of the Japanese Home Islands, Korea or Formosa, and delegation of the punishment of war criminals to the Japanese government.

At Potsdam, Truman agreed to a request from Winston Churchill that Britain be represented when the atomic bomb was dropped. William Penney and Group Captain Leonard Cheshire were sent to Tinian, but LeMay would not let them accompany the Hiroshima mission. They would subsequently take part in the Nagasaki mission as observers.

=== Bombs ===
The Little Boy bomb, except for the uranium payload, was ready at the beginning of May 1945. There were two uranium-235 components, a hollow cylindrical projectile and a cylindrical target insert. The projectile was completed on 15 June, and the target insert on 24 July. The projectile and eight bomb pre-assemblies (partly assembled bombs without the powder charge and fissile components) left Hunters Point Naval Shipyard, California, on 16 July aboard the cruiser USS Indianapolis, and arrived on Tinian on 26 July. The target insert followed by air on 30 July, accompanied by Commander Francis Birch from Project Alberta. The bomb was later described by physicist Harold Agnew, who flew in an accompanying aircraft, as "completely unsafe"; it would normally be armed, an exceptionally delicate task, on the ground before takeoff; responding to concerns expressed by the 509th Composite Group about the possibility of a B-29 crashing on takeoff with an armed bomb on board, Birch modified the Little Boy design to incorporate a removable breech plug that would permit the bomb to be armed in flight.

The first plutonium core, along with its polonium-beryllium urchin initiator, was transported in the custody of Project Alberta courier Raemer Schreiber in a magnesium field carrying case designed for the purpose by Philip Morrison. Magnesium was chosen because it does not act as a neutron reflector. The core departed from Kirtland Army Air Field on a C-54 transport aircraft of the 509th Composite Group's 320th Troop Carrier Squadron on 26 July, and arrived at North Field 28 July. Three Fat Man high-explosive pre-assemblies, designated F31, F32, and F33, were picked up at Kirtland on 28 July by three B-29s, two from the 393rd Bombardment Squadron plus one from the 216th Army Air Force Base Unit, and transported to North Field, arriving on 2 August.

== Hiroshima ==
=== Hiroshima during World War II ===
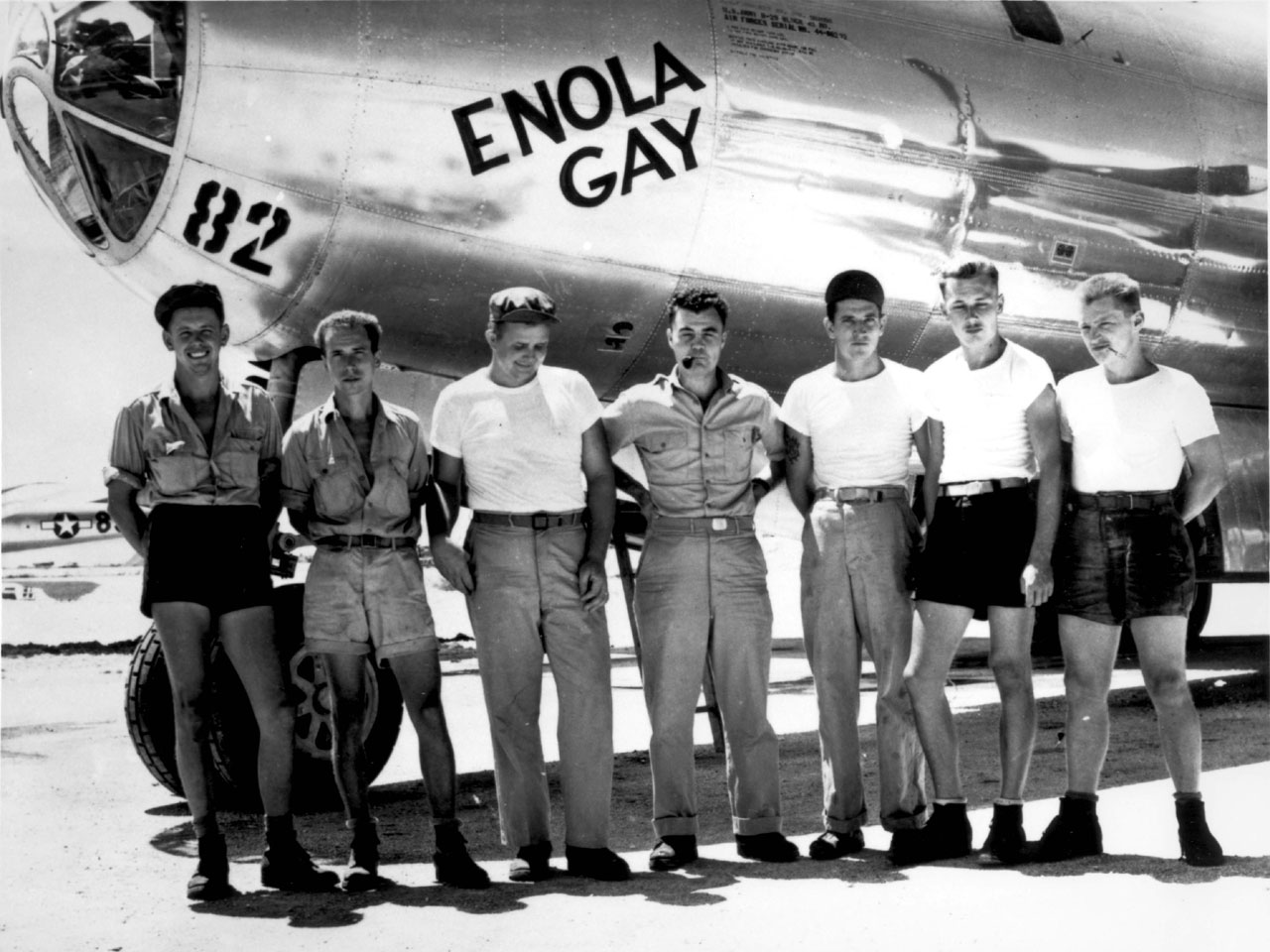
The Enola Gay dropped the "Little Boy" atomic bomb on Hiroshima. Paul Tibbets (center in photograph) can be seen with six members of the ground crew.

At the time of its bombing, Hiroshima was a city of industrial and military significance. A number of military units were located nearby, the most important of which was the headquarters of Field Marshal Shunroku Hata's Second General Army, which commanded the defense of all of southern Japan, and was located in Hiroshima Castle. Hata's command consisted of some 400,000 men, most of whom were on Kyushu where an Allied invasion was correctly anticipated. Also present in Hiroshima were the headquarters of the 59th Army, the 5th Division and the 224th Division, a recently formed mobile unit. The city was defended by five batteries of 70 mm and 80 mm (2.8 and 3.1 inch) anti-aircraft guns of the 3rd Anti-Aircraft Division, including units from the 121st and 122nd Anti-Aircraft Regiments and the 22nd and 45th Separate Anti-Aircraft Battalions. In total, an estimated 40,000 Japanese military personnel were stationed in the city.

Hiroshima was a supply and logistics base for the Japanese military. The city was a communications center, a key port for shipping, and an assembly area for troops. It supported a large war industry, manufacturing parts for planes and boats, for bombs, rifles, and handguns. The center of the city contained several reinforced concrete buildings. Outside the center, the area was congested by a dense collection of small timber workshops set among Japanese houses. A few larger industrial plants lay near the outskirts of the city. The houses were constructed of timber with tile roofs, and many of the industrial buildings were also built around timber frames. The city as a whole was highly susceptible to fire damage. It was the second largest city in Japan after Kyoto that was still undamaged by air raids, primarily because it lacked the aircraft manufacturing industry that was the XXI Bomber Command's priority target. On 3 July, the Joint Chiefs of Staff placed it off limits to bombers, along with Kokura, Niigata and Kyoto.

The population of Hiroshima had reached a peak of over 381,000 earlier in the war but prior to the atomic bombing, the population had steadily decreased because of a systematic evacuation ordered by the Japanese government. At the time of the attack, the population was approximately 340,000–350,000. Residents wondered why Hiroshima had been spared destruction by firebombing. Some speculated that the city was to be saved for U.S. occupation headquarters; others thought perhaps their relatives in Hawaii and California had petitioned the U.S. government to avoid bombing Hiroshima. More realistic city officials had ordered buildings torn down to create long, straight firebreaks. These continued to be expanded and extended up to the morning of 6 August 1945.

=== Bombing of Hiroshima ===
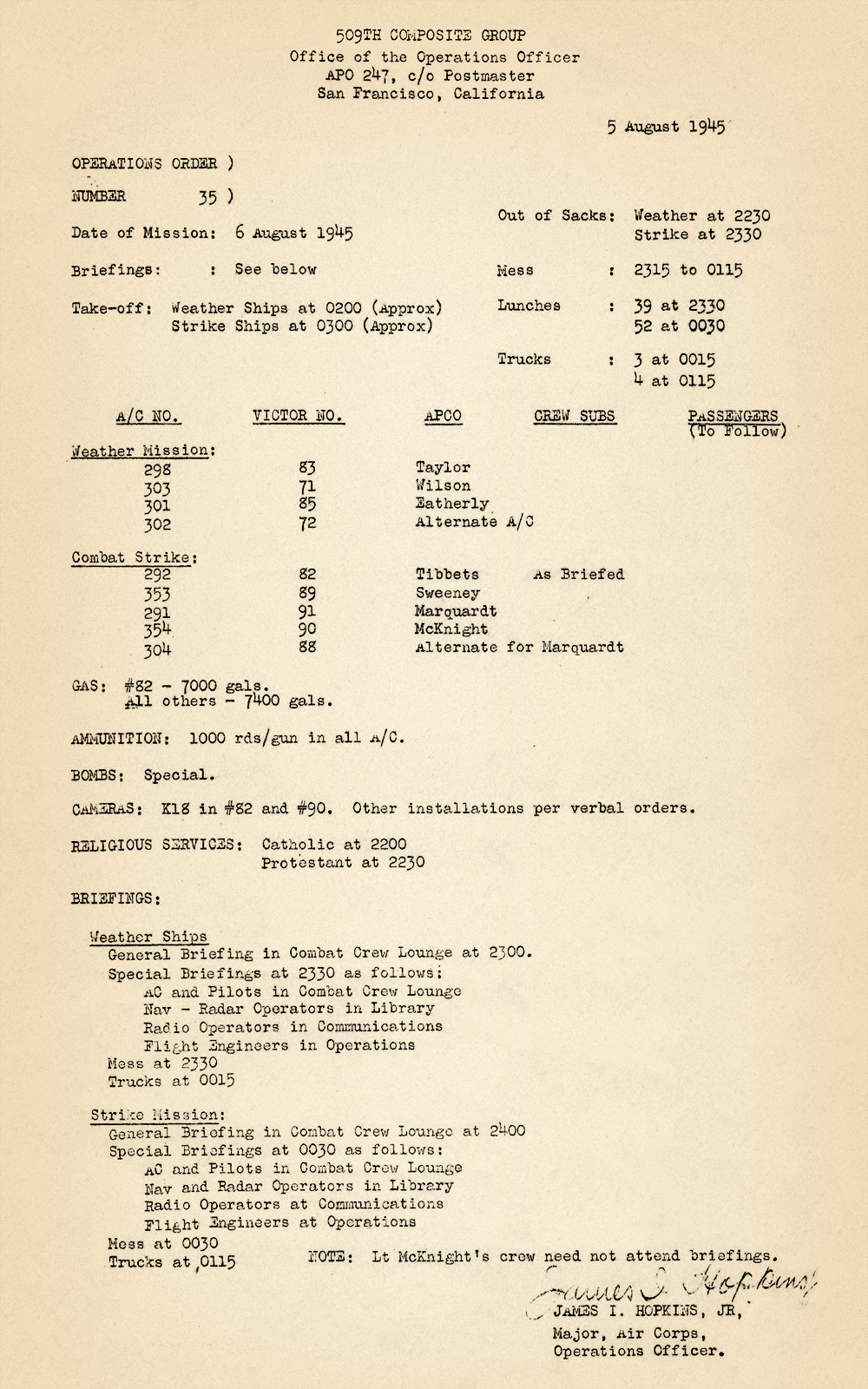
Strike order for the Hiroshima bombing as posted on 5 August 1945

Hiroshima was the primary target of the first atomic bombing mission on 6 August, with Kokura and Nagasaki as alternative targets. The 393rd Bombardment Squadron B-29 Enola Gay, named after Tibbets's mother and piloted by Tibbets, took off from North Field, Tinian, about six hours' flight time from Japan, at 02:45 local time. Enola Gay was accompanied by two other B-29s: The Great Artiste, commanded by Major Charles Sweeney, which carried instrumentation, and a then-nameless aircraft later called Necessary Evil, commanded by Captain George Marquardt. Necessary Evil was the photography aircraft.

Special Mission 13, primary target Hiroshima, 6 August 1945
Aircraft	Pilot	Call sign	Mission role
Straight Flush	Major Claude R. Eatherly	Dimples 85	Weather reconnaissance (Hiroshima)
Jabit III	Major John A. Wilson	Dimples 71	Weather reconnaissance (Kokura)
Full House	Major Ralph R. Taylor	Dimples 83	Weather reconnaissance (Nagasaki)
Enola Gay	Colonel Paul W. Tibbets	Dimples 82	Weapon delivery
The Great Artiste	Major Charles W. Sweeney	Dimples 89	Blast measurement instrumentation
Necessary Evil	Captain George W. Marquardt	Dimples 91	Strike observation and photography
Top Secret	Captain Charles F. McKnight	Dimples 72	Strike spare – did not complete mission

After leaving Tinian, the aircraft made their way separately to Iwo Jima to rendezvous with Sweeney and Marquardt at 05:55 at 2,800 meters (9,200 ft), and set course for Japan. The aircraft arrived over Hiroshima in clear visibility at 9,470 meters (31,060 ft). Parsons, who was in command of the mission, armed the bomb in flight to minimize the risks during takeoff. He had witnessed four B-29s crash and burn at takeoff, and feared that a nuclear explosion would occur if a B-29 crashed with an armed Little Boy on board. His assistant, Second Lieutenant Morris R. Jeppson, removed the safety devices 30 minutes before reaching the target area.

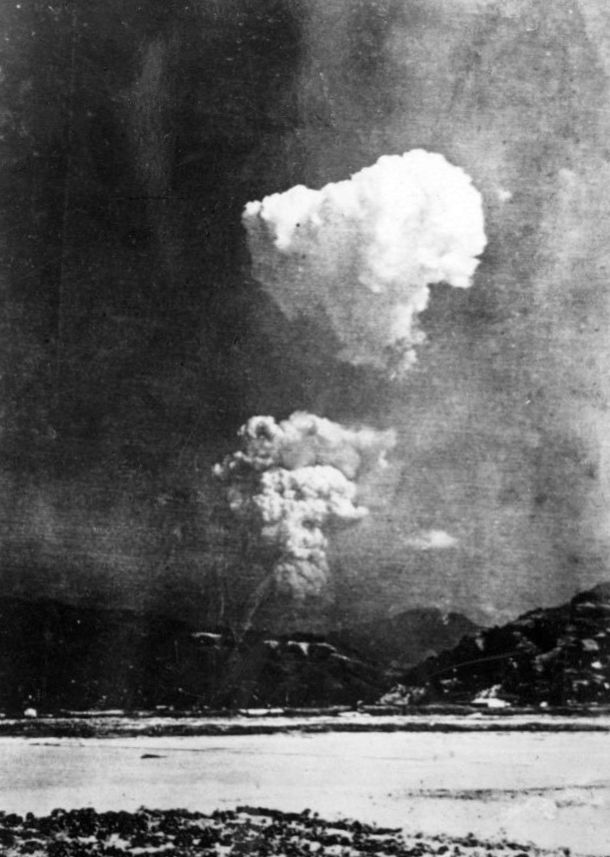
The Hiroshima atom bomb cloud 2–5 minutes after detonation

During the night of 5–6 August, Japanese early warning radar detected the approach of numerous American aircraft headed for the southern part of Japan. Radar detected 65 bombers headed for Saga, 102 bound for Maebashi, 261 en route to Nishinomiya, 111 headed for Ube and 66 bound for Imabari. An alert was given and radio broadcasting stopped in many cities, among them Hiroshima. The all-clear was sounded in Hiroshima at 00:05. About an hour before the bombing, the air raid alert was sounded again, as Straight Flush flew over the city. It broadcast a short message, which was picked up by Enola Gay. It read: "Cloud cover less than 3/10th at all altitudes. Advice: bomb primary." The all-clear was sounded over Hiroshima again at 07:09.

At 08:09, Tibbets started his bomb run and handed control over to his bombardier, Major Thomas Ferebee. The release at 08:15 (Hiroshima time) went as planned, and the Little Boy containing about 64 kg (141 lb) of uranium-235 took 44.4 seconds to fall from the aircraft flying at about 9,400 meters (31,000 ft) to a detonation height of about 580 meters (1,900 ft) above the city. Enola Gay was 18.5 km (11.5 mi) away before it felt the shock waves from the blast. Only Tibbets, Parsons, and Ferebee knew of the nature of the weapon; the others on the bomber were only told to expect a blinding flash and given protective goggles. "It was hard to believe what we saw", Tibbets told reporters, while Parsons said "the whole thing was tremendous and awe-inspiring ... the men aboard with me gasped 'My God'." He and Tibbets compared the shockwave to "a close burst of ack-ack fire". Necessary Evil's cameras all failed; the only film of the attack was made by a 16 mm cine camera smuggled onto the aircraft by a crew member.

Due to crosswind, the bomb missed the aiming point, the Aioi Bridge, by approximately 240 m (800 ft) and detonated directly over Shima Surgical Clinic. It released energy equivalent to 15–16 ± 2 kilotons of TNT (62.8–66.9 ± 8.4 TJ)—four times the tonnage of conventional bombs that had wiped out the city of Dresden in Germany. The weapon was very inefficient, with only 1.7 percent of its material fissioning. The radius of total destruction was about 1.6 kilometers (1 mi), with resulting fires across 11 km^{2} (4.4 sq mi).

Enola Gay's crew received a heroes' welcome on landing at Tinian, with hundreds of cheering welcomers and "more generals than I'd ever seen in my life. We wondered what the hell they were doing there" according to navigator Theodore "Dutch" Van Kirk. When Tibbets stepped from his B-29 the Distinguished Service Cross was unexpectedly pinned to his chest while he was still holding his pipe.

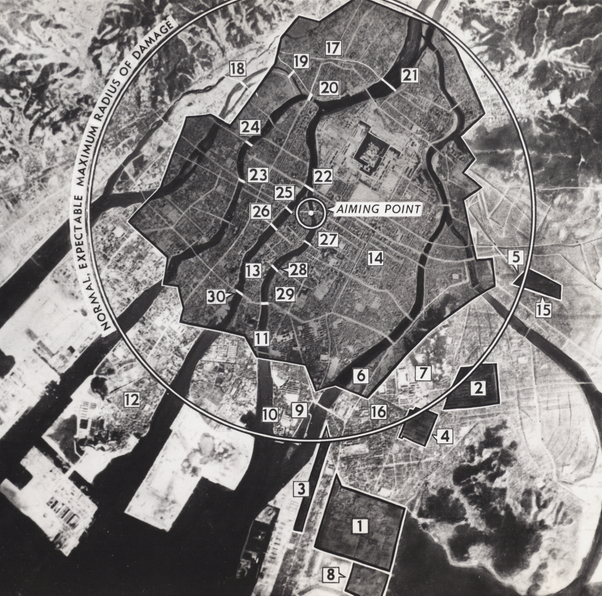
Maximum radius of destruction, shown as a circle with a 19,000 feet diameter. Shaded areas show devastated sectors.

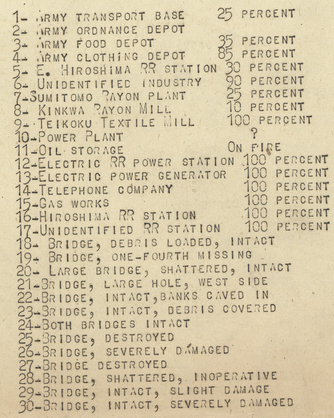
Landmarks and their status. Percentage show percentage of total destruction.

=== Events on the ground ===
People on the ground reported a pika (ピカ)—a brilliant flash of light—followed by a don (ドン)—a loud booming sound. The experiences of survivors in the city varied depending on their location and circumstances, but a common factor in survivor accounts was a sense that a conventional weapon (sometimes cited as a magnesium bomb, which has a distinctively bright white flash) had happened to go off immediately in their vicinity, causing tremendous damage (throwing people across rooms, breaking glass, crushing buildings). After emerging from the ruins, the survivors gradually understood that the entire city had been attacked at the same instant. Survivor accounts frequently feature walking through the ruins of the city without a clear sense of where to go, and encountering the cries of people trapped within crushed structures, or people with horrific burns. As the numerous small fires created by the blast began to grow, they merged into a firestorm that moved quickly throughout the ruins, killing many who had been trapped, and causing people to jump into Hiroshima's rivers in search of sanctuary (many of whom drowned). The photographer Yoshito Matsushige took the only photographs of Hiroshima immediately after the bombing. He described in a later interview that, immediately after the bombing, "everywhere there was dust; it made a grayish darkness over everything." He took five photographs in total before he could not continue: "It was really a terrible scene. It was just like something out of hell." Survivor accounts also prominently feature cases of survivors who appeared uninjured, but who would succumb within hours or days to what would later be identified as radiation sickness.

Estimating the number of people killed by the blast, firestorm, and radiation effects of the bombing has been hampered by imprecise record-keeping during the war, the chaos caused by the attack, uncertainty about the number of people in the city on the morning of the attack, and variations in methodology. Reports by the Manhattan Project in 1946 and the U.S. occupation–led Joint Commission for the Investigation of the Atomic Bomb in Japan in 1951 estimated 66,000 dead and 69,000 injured, and 64,500 dead and 72,000 injured, respectively, while Japanese-led reconsiderations of the death toll in the 1970s estimated 140,000 dead in Hiroshima by the end of the year. Estimates also vary on the number of Japanese military personnel killed. The United States Strategic Bombing Survey estimated in 1946 that there were 24,158 soldiers present in Hiroshima at the time of the attack, and that 6,789 were killed or missing as a result; the 1970s reconsiderations estimated about 10,000 military dead. A modern estimate by the Radiation Effects Research Foundation (RERF) estimates a city population of 340,000 to 350,000 at the time of the bombing, of which 90,000 to 166,000 died by the end of the year.

U.S. surveys estimated that 12 km^{2} (4.7 sq mi) of the city were destroyed. Japanese officials determined that 69 percent of Hiroshima's buildings were destroyed and another 6 to 7 percent damaged. Some of the reinforced concrete buildings in Hiroshima had been very strongly constructed because of the earthquake danger in Japan, and their framework did not collapse even though they were fairly close to the blast center. Since the bomb detonated in the air, the blast was directed more downward than sideways, which was largely responsible for the survival of the Prefectural Industrial Promotional Hall, now commonly known as the Genbaku (A-bomb) dome, which was only 150 m (490 ft) from ground zero (the hypocenter). The ruin was named Hiroshima Peace Memorial and was made a UNESCO World Heritage Site in 1996 over the objections of the United States and China, which expressed reservations on the grounds that other Asian nations were the ones who suffered the greatest loss of life and property, and a focus on Japan lacked historical perspective.

Hiroshima bombing
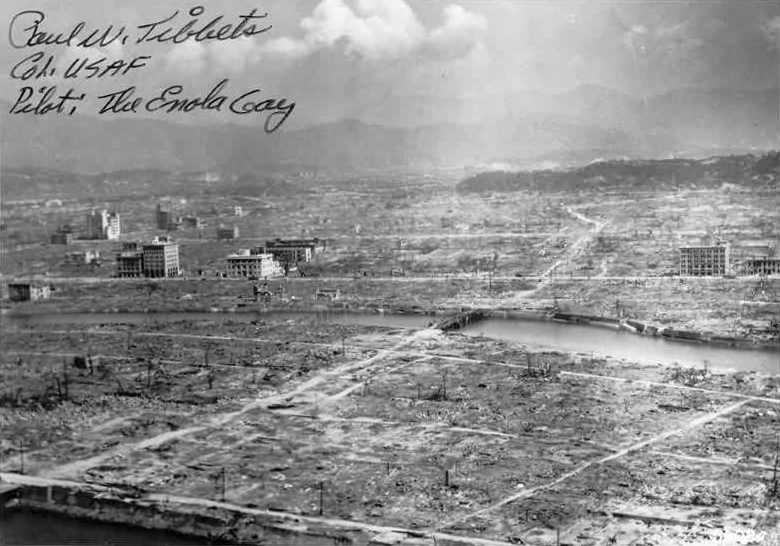
Hiroshima in the aftermath of the bombing

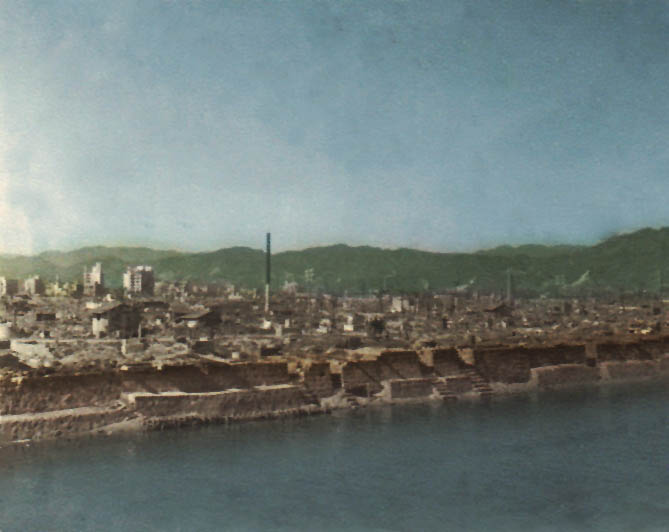
Ruins of Hiroshima

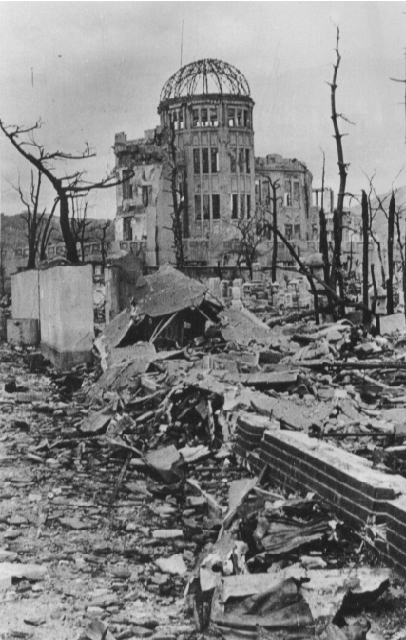
The Hiroshima Genbaku Dome after the bombing

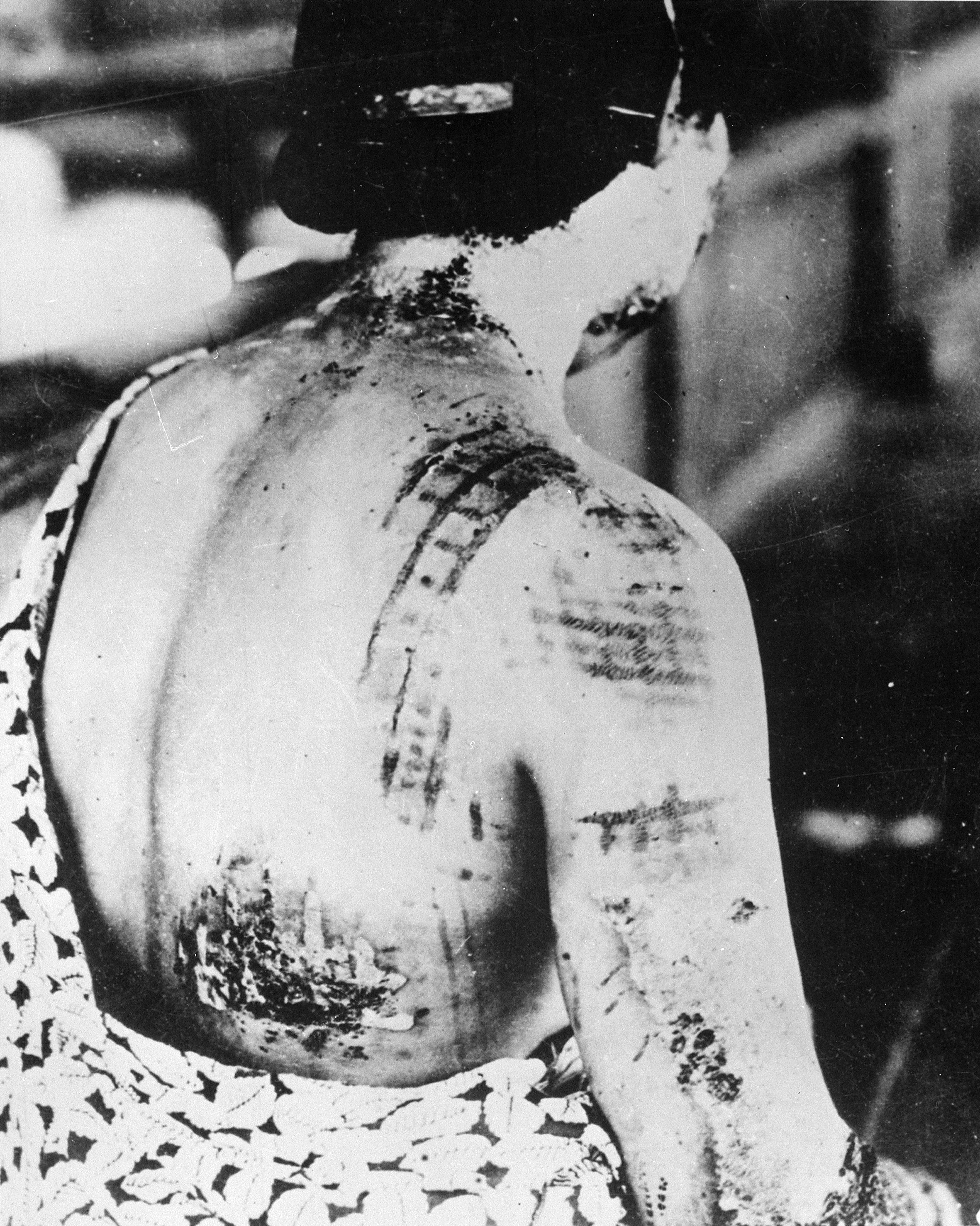
The pattern of the kimono worn by a survivor burned into her skin in tight-fitting areas.

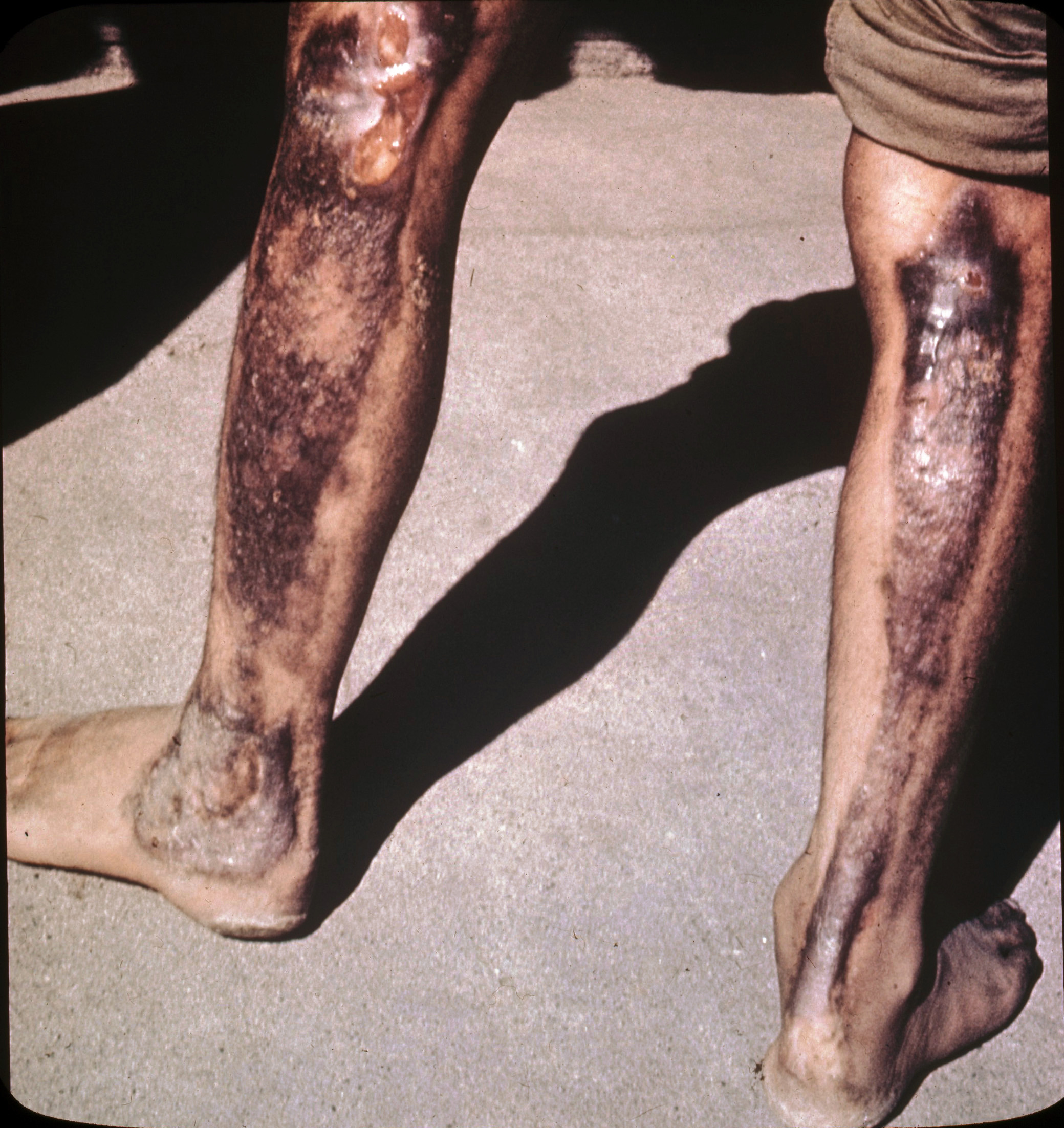
Direct, thermal flash burns

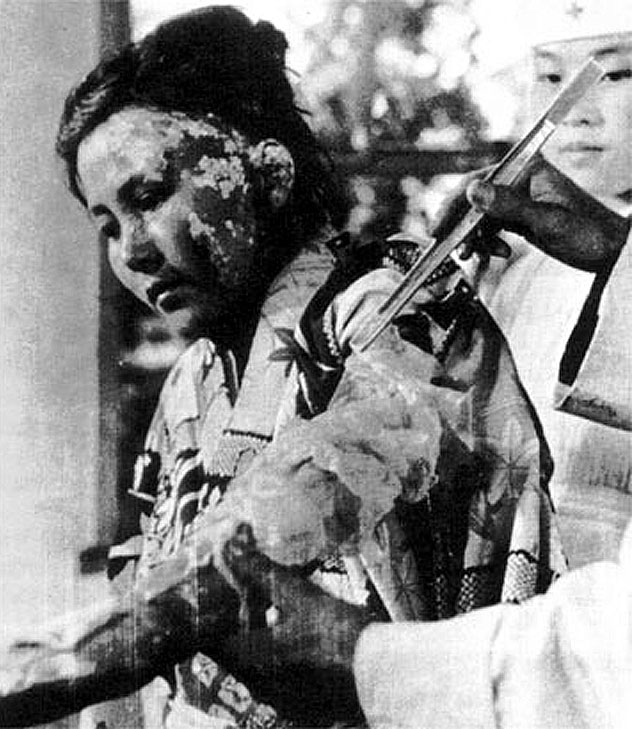
22-year old victim Toyoko Kugata being treated at the Hiroshima Red Cross Hospital (6 October 1945)

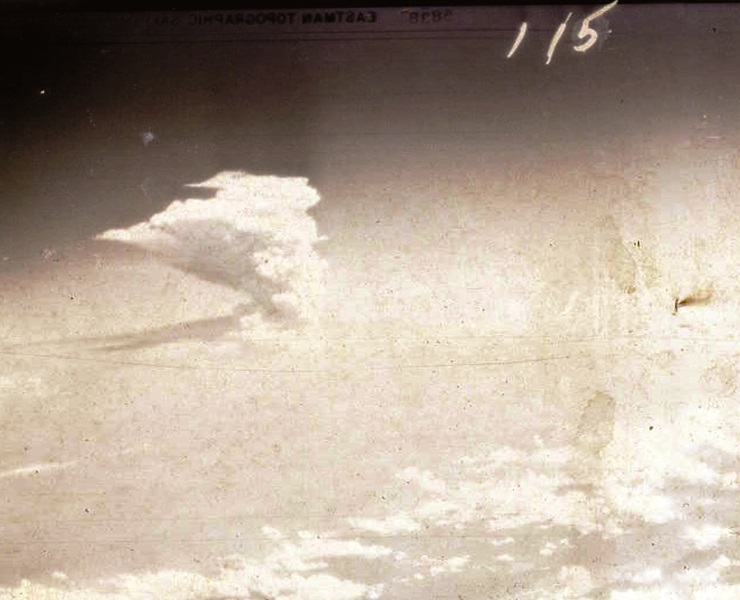
A photograph of the aftermath of the bombing of Hiroshima

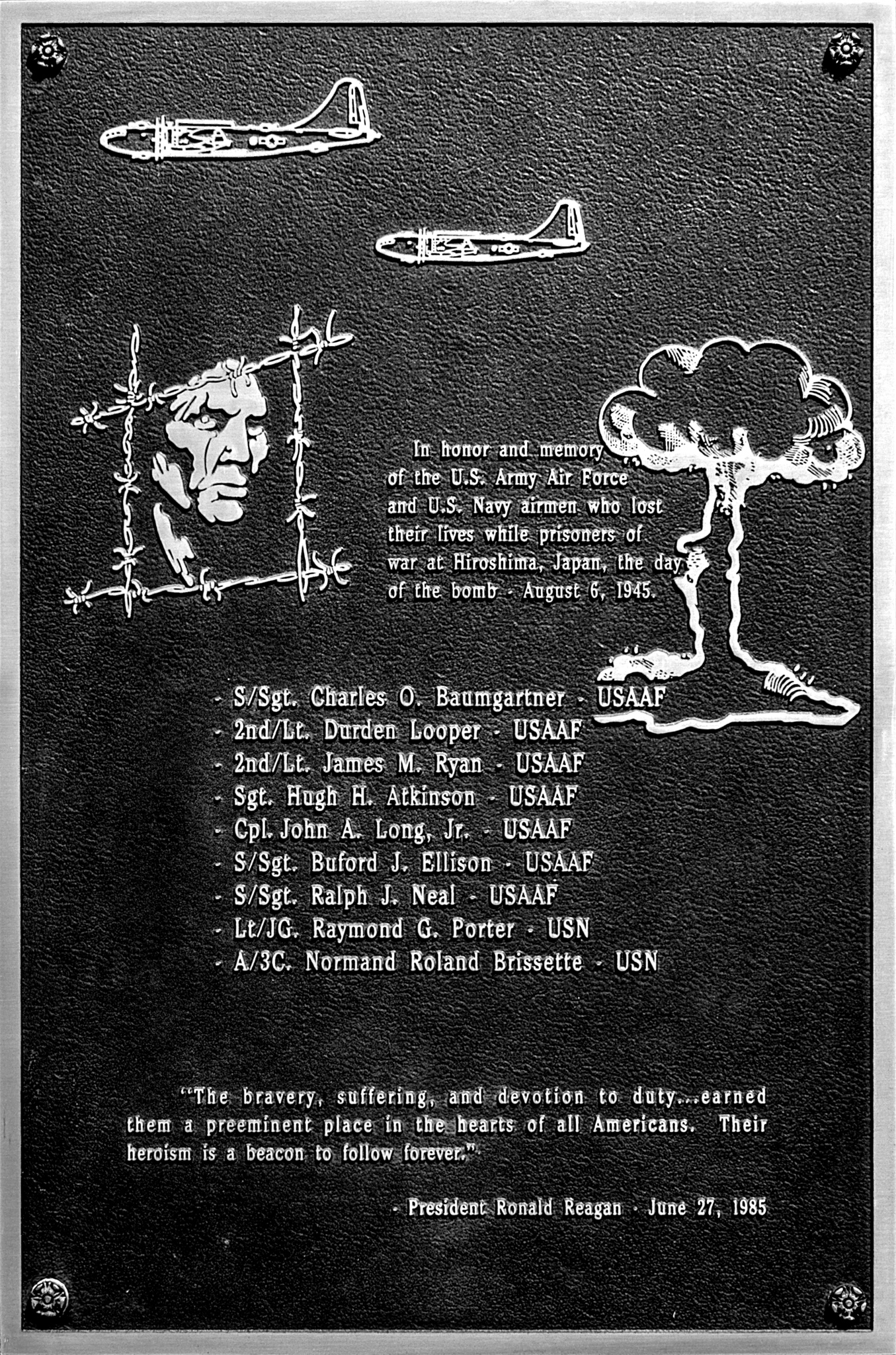
Memorial at Andersonville NHS for the American airmen who died in the blast

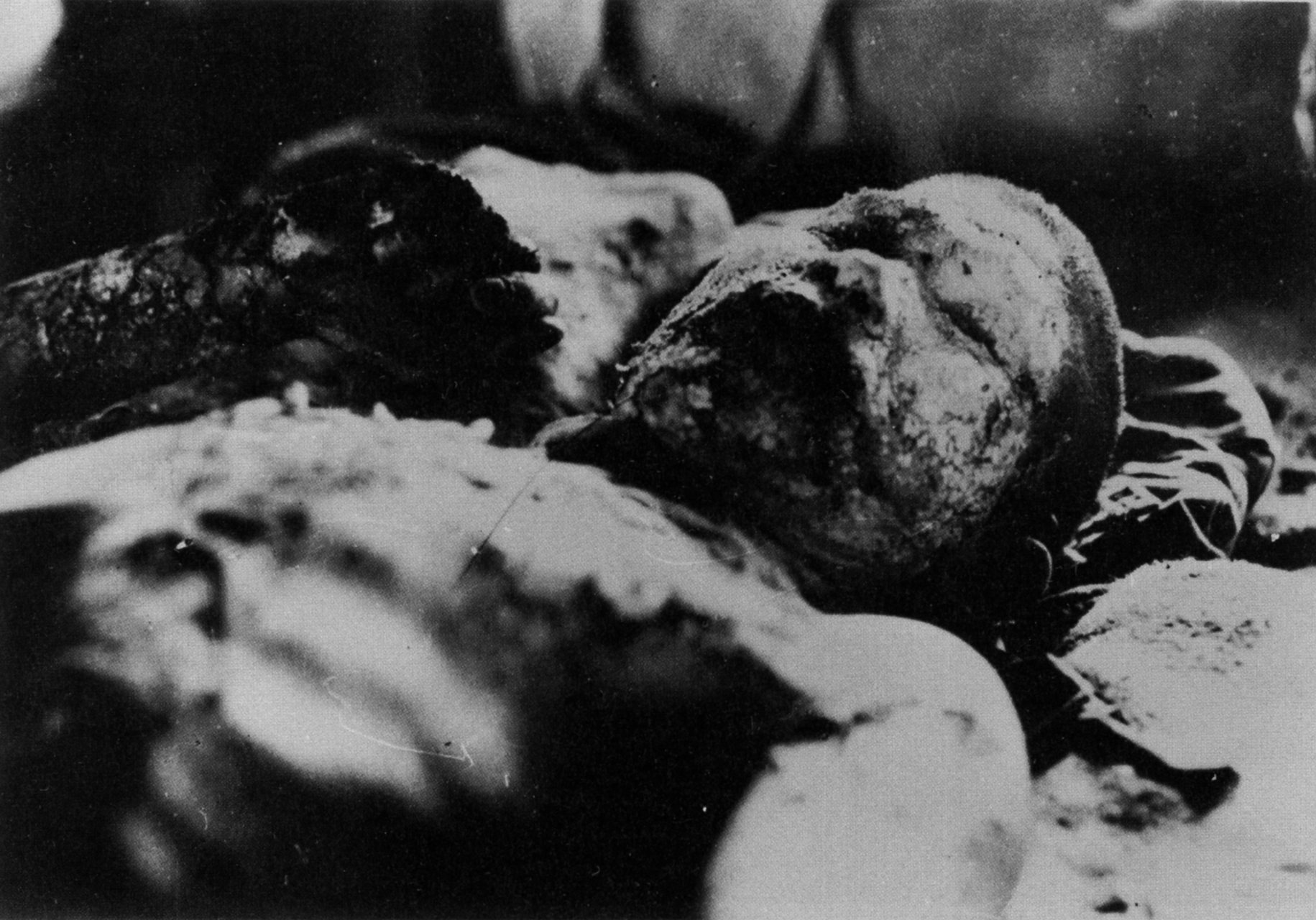
A victim with burns

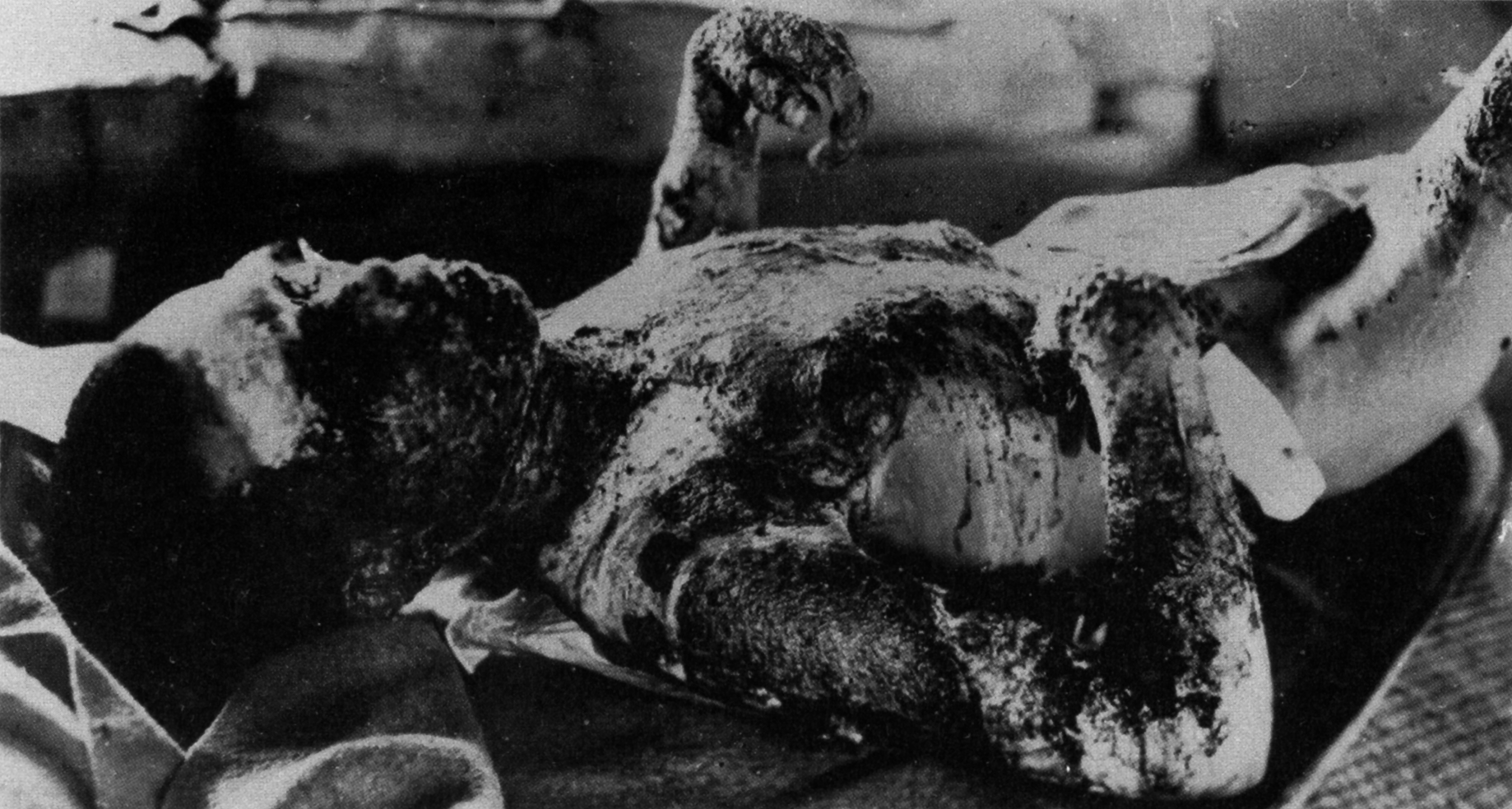
A victim with whole body burns

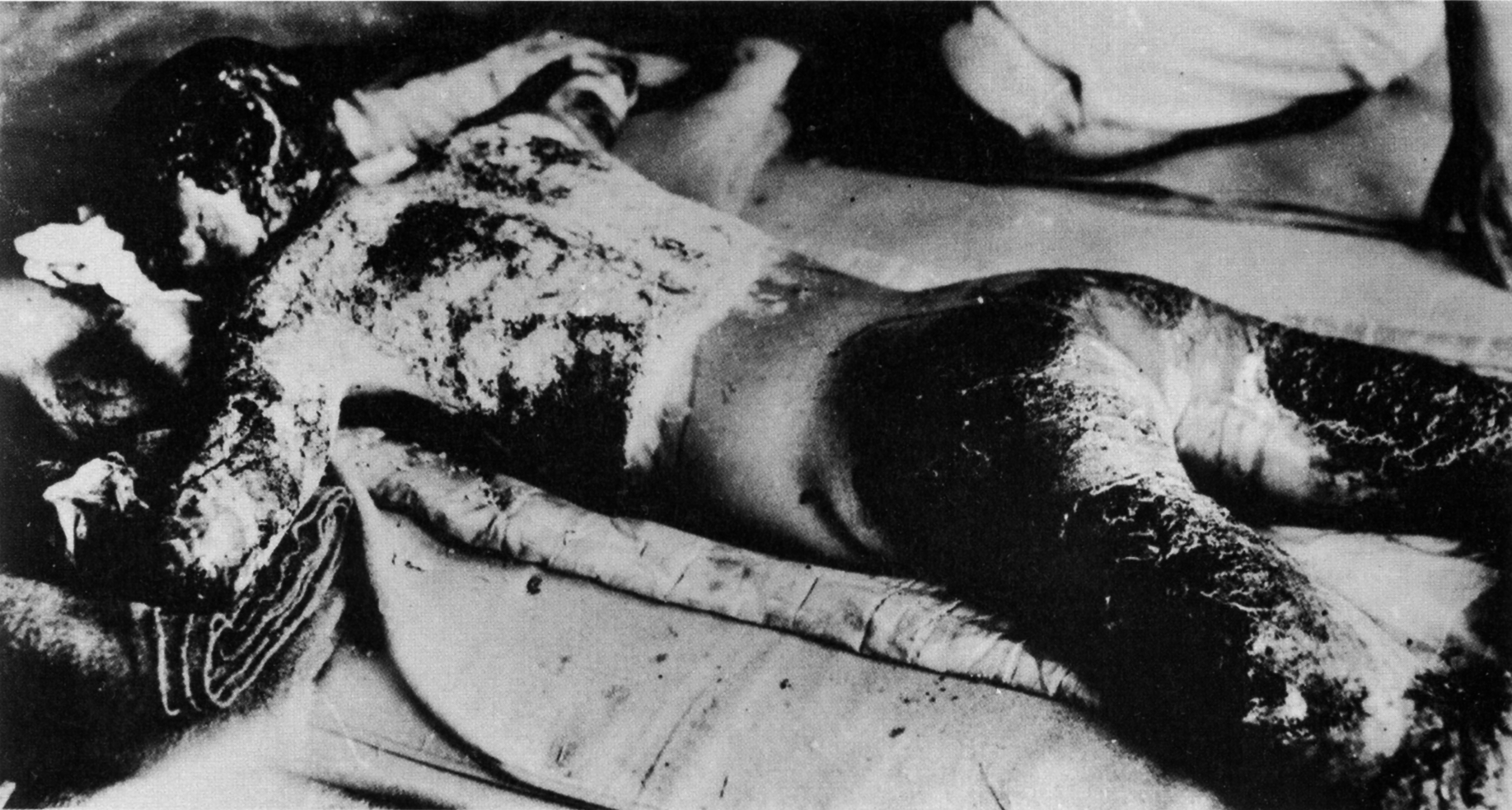
A victim with whole body burns

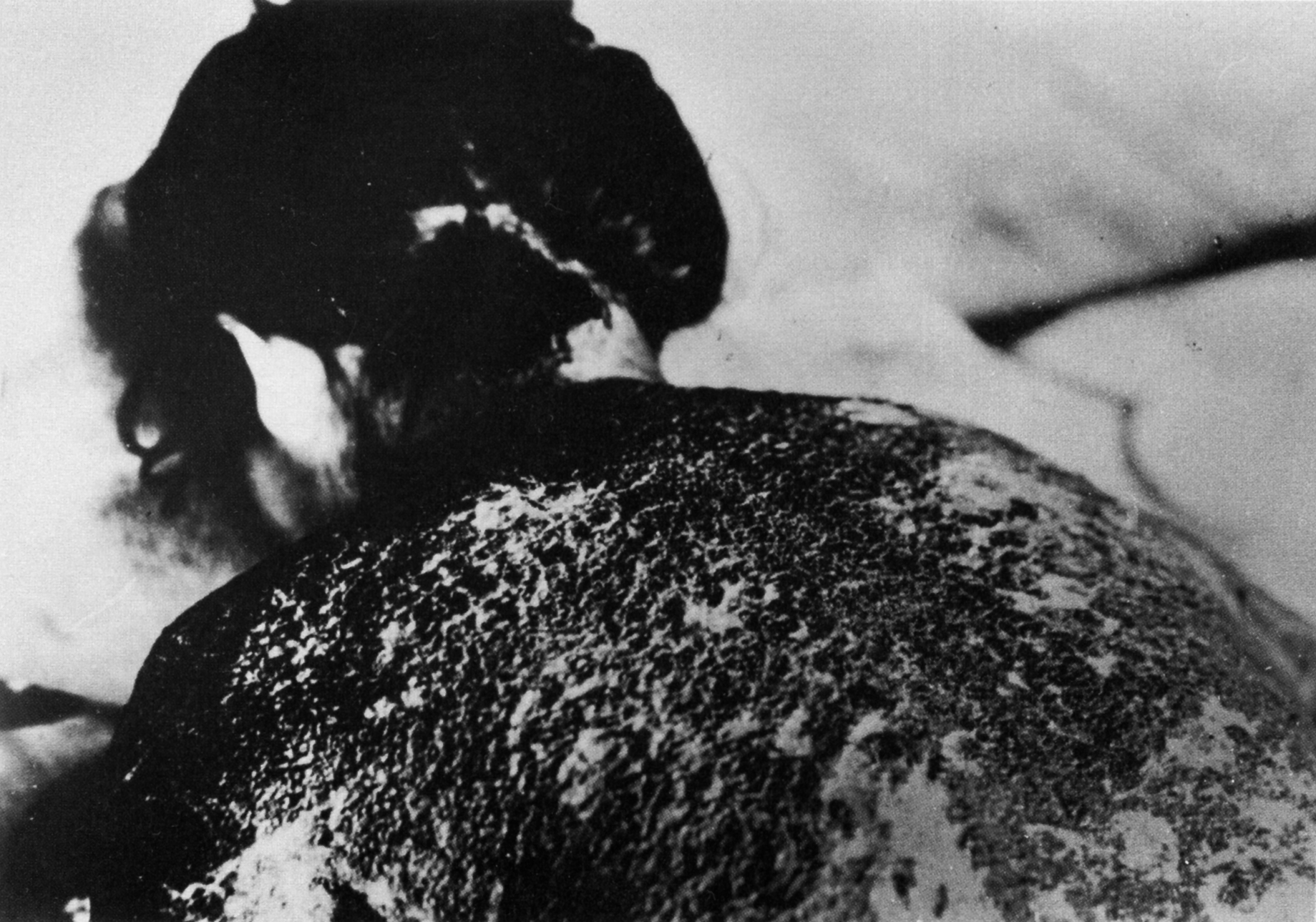
Victim with burns on her back

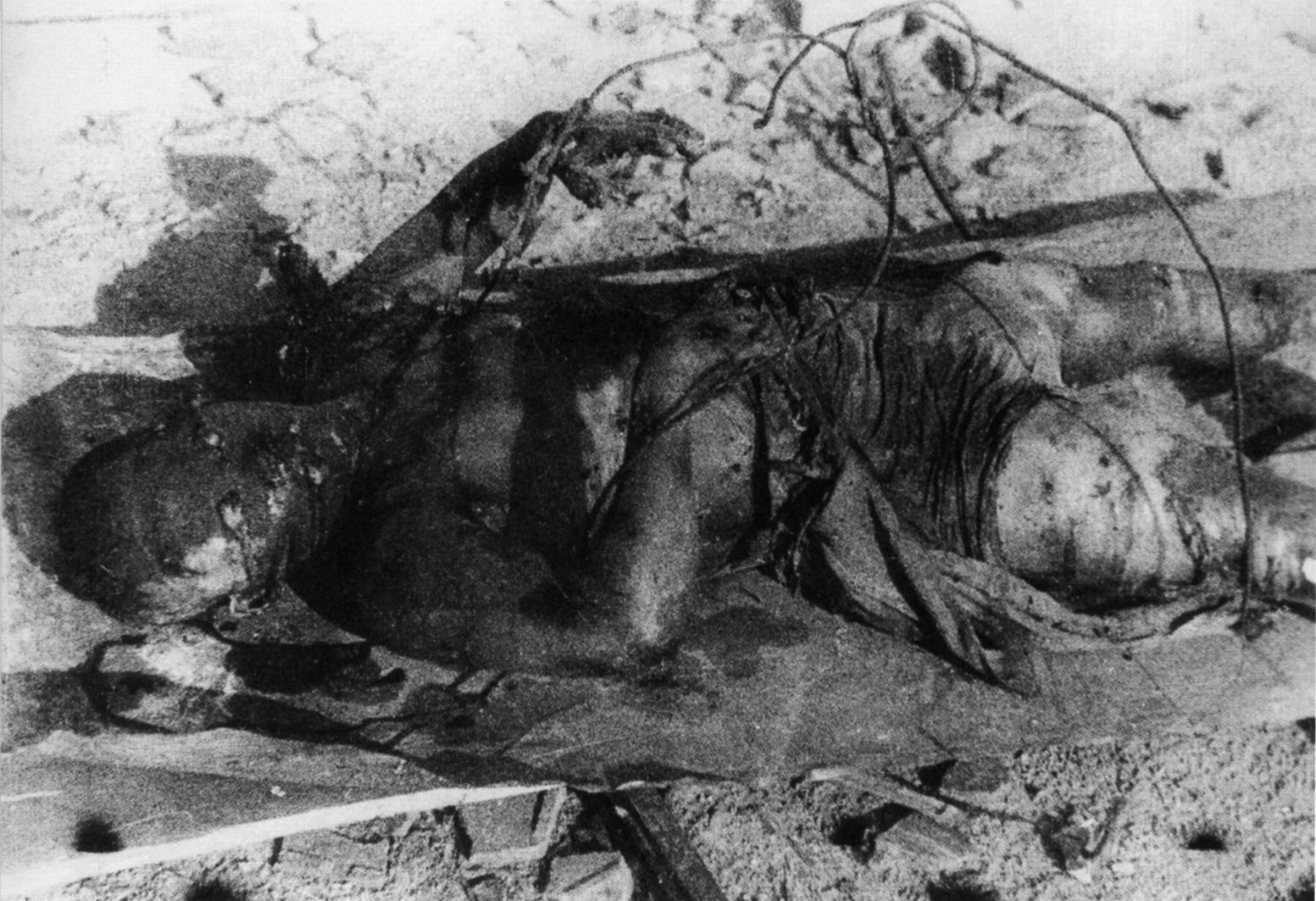
Corpse near the Western Parade Ground

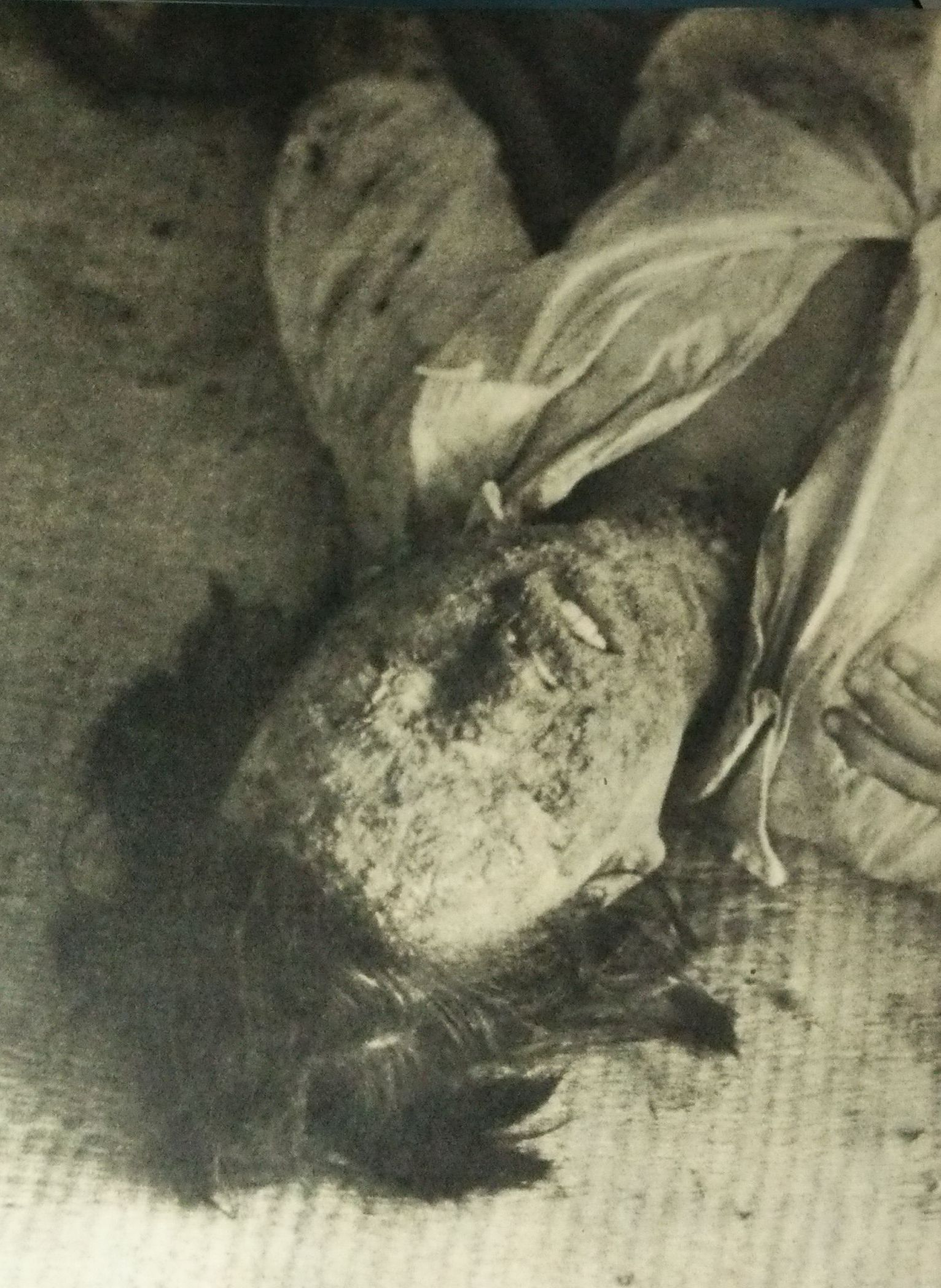
A mobilized school girl suffered burns to face

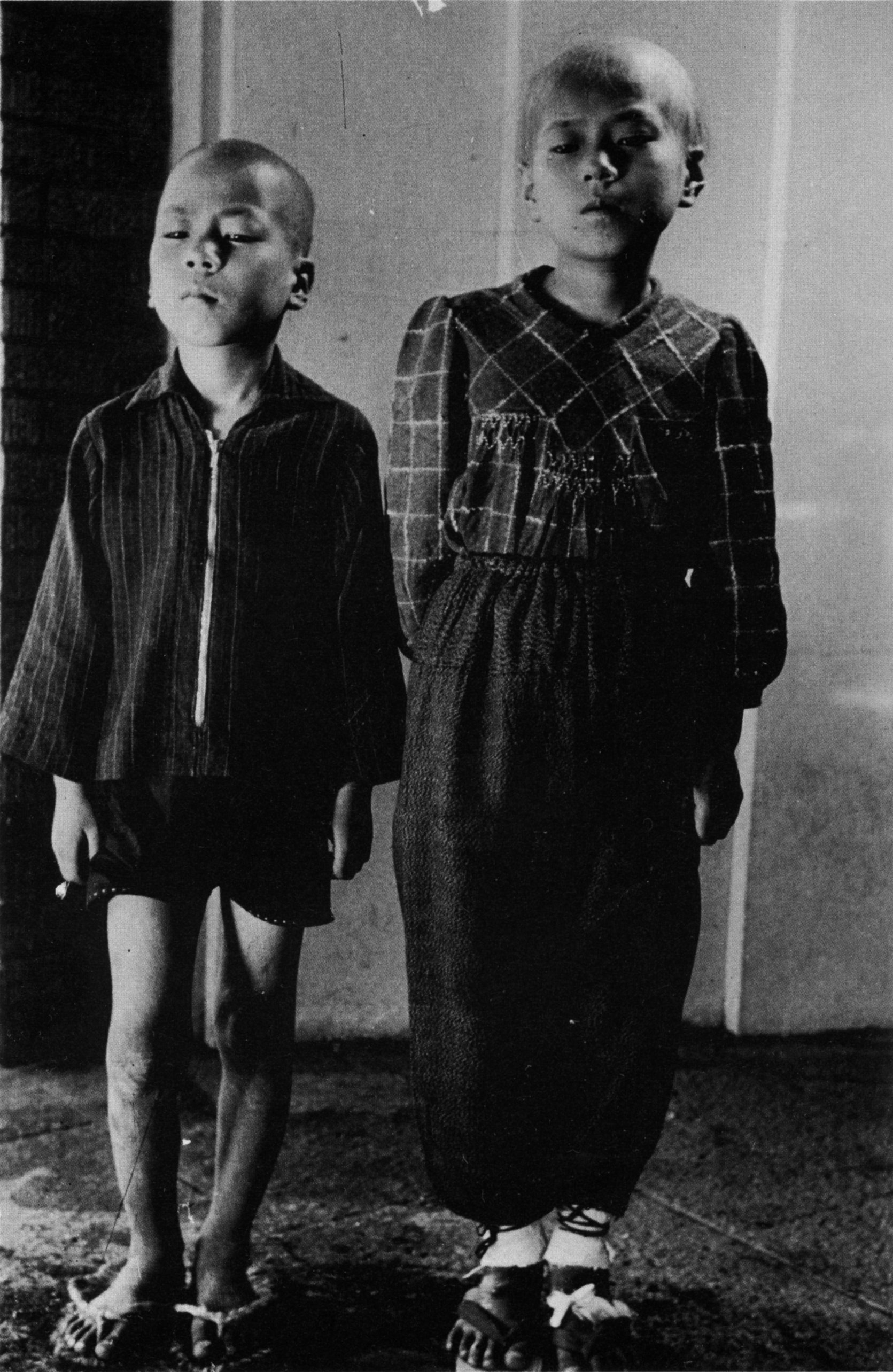
Elder sister and younger brother who suffered radiation disease. The brother died in 1949 and the sister in 1965.

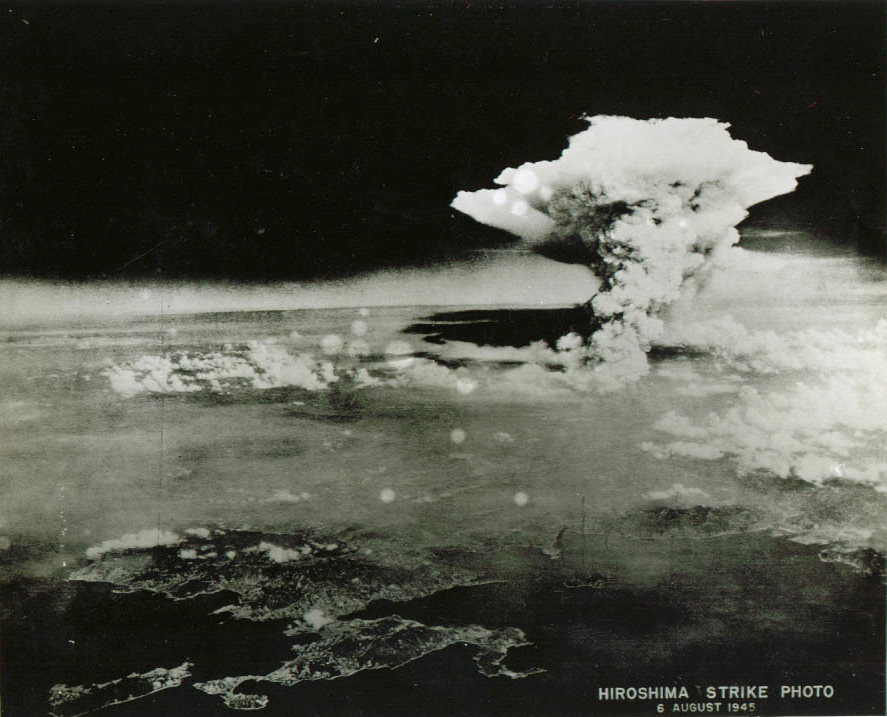
For decades this photo was misidentified as the mushroom cloud of the bomb that formed at c. 08:16. However, due to its much greater height, the scene was identified in March 2016 as the firestorm-cloud that engulfed the city, some three hours after the bombing.

The air raid warning had been cleared at 07:31, and many people were outside, going about their activities. Eizō Nomura was the closest known survivor, being in the basement of a reinforced concrete building (it remained as the Rest House after the war) only 170 meters (560 ft) from ground zero at the time of the attack. He died in 1982, aged 84. Akiko Takakura was among the closest survivors to the hypocenter of the blast. She was in the solidly-built Bank of Hiroshima only 300 meters (980 ft) from ground-zero at the time of the attack.

Over 90 percent of the doctors and 93 percent of the nurses in Hiroshima were killed or injured—most had been in the downtown area which received the greatest damage. The hospitals were destroyed or heavily damaged. Only one doctor, Terufumi Sasaki, remained on duty at the Red Cross Hospital. Nonetheless, by early afternoon the police and volunteers had established evacuation center at hospitals, schools and tram stations, and a morgue was established in the Asano library. Survivors of the blast gathered for medical treatment, but many would die before receiving any help, leaving behind rings of corpses around hospitals.

Most elements of the Japanese Second General Army headquarters were undergoing physical training on the grounds of Hiroshima Castle, barely 820 meters (900 yd) from the hypocenter. The attack killed 3,243 troops on the parade ground. The communications room of Chugoku Military District Headquarters that was responsible for issuing and lifting air raid warnings was located in a semi-basement in the castle. Yoshie Oka, a Hijiyama Girls High School student who had been mobilized to serve as a communications officer, had just sent a message that the alarm had been issued for Hiroshima and neighboring Yamaguchi when the bomb exploded. She used a special phone to inform Fukuyama Headquarters (some 100 kilometers (62 mi) away) that "Hiroshima has been attacked by a new type of bomb. The city is in a state of near-total destruction."

Since Mayor Senkichi Awaya had been killed at the mayoral residence, Field Marshal Shunroku Hata, who was only slightly wounded, took over the administration of the city and coordinated relief efforts. Many of his staff had been killed or fatally wounded, including Lieutenant Colonel Yi U, a prince of the Korean imperial family who was serving as a General Staff Officer. Hata's senior surviving staff officer was the wounded Colonel Kumao Imoto, who acted as his chief of staff. Soldiers from the undamaged Hiroshima Ujina Harbor used Shin'yō-class suicide motorboats, intended to repel the American invasion, to collect the wounded and take them down the rivers to the military hospital at Ujina. Trucks and trains brought in relief supplies and evacuated survivors from the city.

Twelve American airmen were imprisoned at the Chugoku Military Police Headquarters, about 400 meters (1,300 ft) from the hypocenter of the blast. Most died instantly, although two were reported to have been executed by their captors, and two prisoners badly injured by the bombing were left next to the Aioi Bridge by the Kempeitai, where they were stoned to death. Eight U.S. prisoners of war killed as part of the medical experiments program at Kyushu University were falsely reported by Japanese authorities as having been killed in the atomic blast as part of an attempted cover up.

The fires created by the atomic bomb detonation carried large amounts of ash into the clouds in the atmosphere. One to two hours after the explosion, a "black rain" fell as a tarry combination of ash, radioactive fallout, and water, causing severe radiation burns in some cases.

=== Japanese realization of the bombing ===
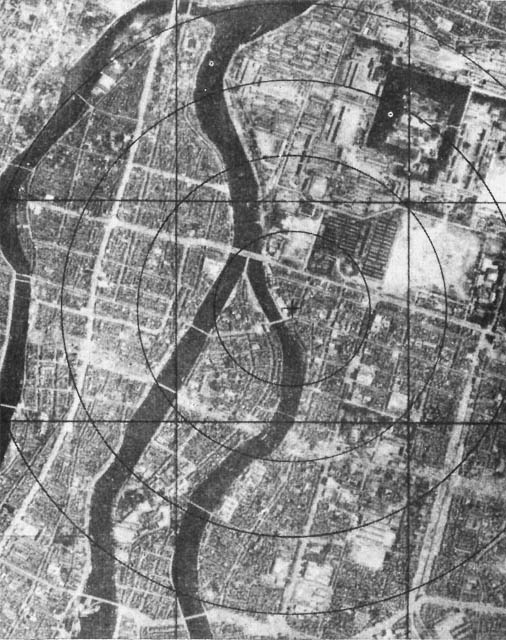
Hiroshima before the bombing

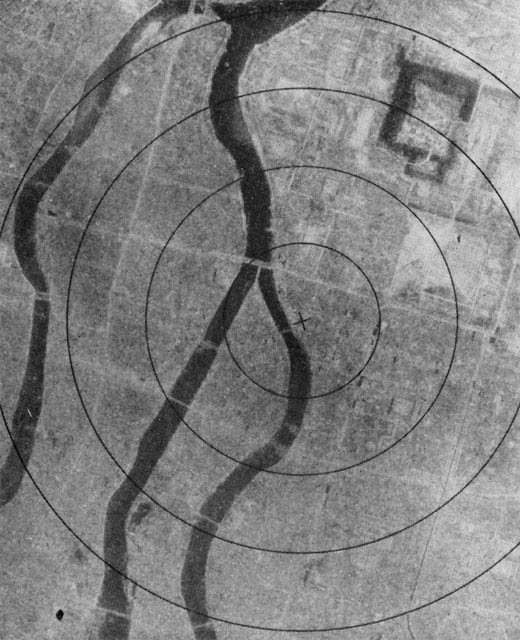
Hiroshima after the bombing and subsequent firestorm

The Tokyo control operator of the Japan Broadcasting Corporation noticed that the Hiroshima station had gone off the air. He tried to re-establish his program by using another telephone line, but it too had failed. About 20 minutes later the Tokyo railroad telegraph center realized that the main line telegraph had stopped working just north of Hiroshima. From some small railway stops within 16 km (10 mi) of the city came unofficial and confused reports of a terrible explosion in Hiroshima. All these reports were transmitted to the headquarters of the Imperial Japanese Army General Staff.

Military bases repeatedly tried to call the Army Control Station in Hiroshima. The complete silence from that city puzzled the General Staff; they knew that no large enemy raid had occurred and that no sizable store of explosives was in Hiroshima at that time. A young officer was instructed to fly immediately to Hiroshima, to land, survey the damage, and return to Tokyo with reliable information for the staff. It was felt that nothing serious had taken place and that the explosion was just a rumor.

The staff officer went to the airport and took off for the southwest. After flying for about three hours, while still nearly 160 km (100 mi) from Hiroshima, he and his pilot saw a great cloud of smoke from the firestorm created by the bomb. After circling the city to survey the damage they landed south of the city, where the staff officer, after reporting to Tokyo, began to organize relief measures. Tokyo learned that the city had been destroyed by a new type of bomb from President Truman's announcement of the strike, sixteen hours later. The official White House announcement was delayed by congestion on circuits from Tinian, which meant that Groves could not initially confirm the extent of the damage to Hiroshima.

The first report from Hiroshima was sent on a hotline by a fourteen-year old female student volunteer communications officer Yoshie Okawa in a bunker at the Chugoku Military District Headquarters, half a mile (800m) from the epicentre. She was not believed at Fukuyama, so she found a soldier above ground who told her that "Hiroshima has been attacked by a new type of bomb. The city is in a state of near-total destruction."

== Events of 7–9 August ==
President Truman on the USS Augusta reading his statement about the bombing of Hiroshima, which described as the product of "the greatest achievement of organized science in history"

Sixteen hours after the Hiroshima bombing, a statement was issued by the White House staff in Truman's name announcing the use of the new weapon. It said that the United States and its allies had "spent two billion dollars on the greatest scientific gamble in history—and won," and warned Japan: "If they do not now accept our terms, they may expect a rain of ruin from the air, the like of which has never been seen on this earth. Behind this air attack will follow sea and land forces in such numbers and power as they have not yet seen and with the fighting skill of which they are already well aware." This was a widely broadcast speech picked up by Japanese news agencies.

The 50,000-watt standard wave station on Saipan, the OWI radio station, broadcast a similar message to Japan every 15 minutes about Hiroshima, stating that more Japanese cities would face a similar fate in the absence of immediate acceptance of the terms of the Potsdam Declaration and emphatically urged civilians to evacuate major cities. Radio Japan, which continued to extoll victory for Japan by never surrendering had informed the Japanese of the destruction of Hiroshima by a single bomb.

Soviet Foreign Minister Vyacheslav Molotov had informed Tokyo of the Soviet Union's unilateral abrogation of the Soviet–Japanese Neutrality Pact on 5 April. At two minutes past midnight on 9 August, Tokyo time, Soviet infantry, armor, and air forces had launched the Manchurian Strategic Offensive Operation. Four hours later, word reached Tokyo of the Soviet Union's official declaration of war. The senior leadership of the Japanese Army began preparations to impose martial law on the nation, with the support of Minister of War Korechika Anami, to stop anyone attempting to make peace.

On 7 August, a day after Hiroshima was destroyed, Yoshio Nishina and other atomic physicists arrived at the city, and carefully examined the damage. They then went back to Tokyo and told the cabinet that Hiroshima was indeed destroyed by a nuclear weapon. Admiral Soemu Toyoda, the Chief of the Naval General Staff, estimated that no more than one or two additional bombs could be readied, so they decided to endure the remaining attacks, acknowledging "there would be more destruction but the war would go on". American Magic codebreakers intercepted the cabinet's messages.

Purnell, Parsons, Tibbets, Spaatz, and LeMay met on Guam that same day to discuss what should be done next. Since there was no indication of Japan surrendering, they decided to proceed with dropping another bomb. Parsons said that Project Alberta would have it ready by 11 August, but Tibbets pointed to weather reports indicating poor flying conditions on that day due to a storm, and asked if the bomb could be readied by 9 August. Parsons agreed to try to do so.

== Nagasaki ==
=== Nagasaki during World War II ===
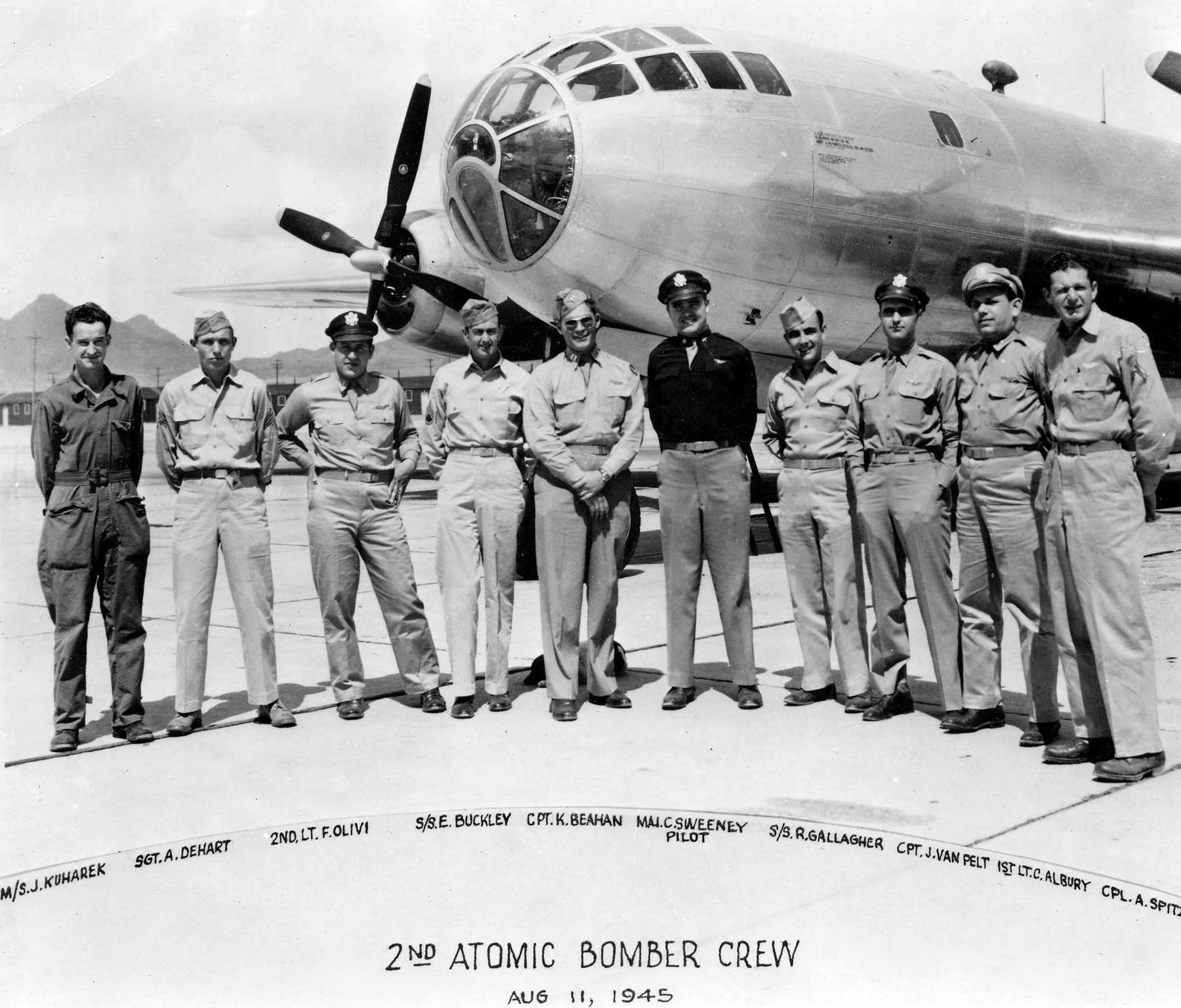
The Bockscar and its crew, who dropped a Fat Man atomic bomb on Nagasaki

The city of Nagasaki had been one of the largest seaports in southern Japan, and was of great wartime importance because of its wide-ranging industrial activity, including the production of ordnance, ships, military equipment, and other war materials. The four largest companies in the city were Mitsubishi Shipyards, Electrical Shipyards, Arms Plant, and Steel and Arms Works, which employed about 90 percent of the city's labor force, and accounted for 90 percent of the city's industry. Although an important industrial city, Nagasaki had been spared from firebombing because its geography made it difficult to locate at night with AN/APQ-13 radar.

Unlike the other target cities, Nagasaki had not been placed off limits to bombers by the Joint Chiefs of Staff's 3 July directive, and was bombed on a small scale five times. During one of these raids on 1 August, a number of conventional high-explosive bombs were dropped on the city. A few hit the shipyards and dock areas in the southwest portion of the city, and several hit the Mitsubishi Steel and Arms Works. By early August, the city was defended by the 134th Anti-Aircraft Regiment of the 4th Anti-Aircraft Division with four batteries of 7 cm (2.8 in) anti-aircraft guns and two searchlight batteries.

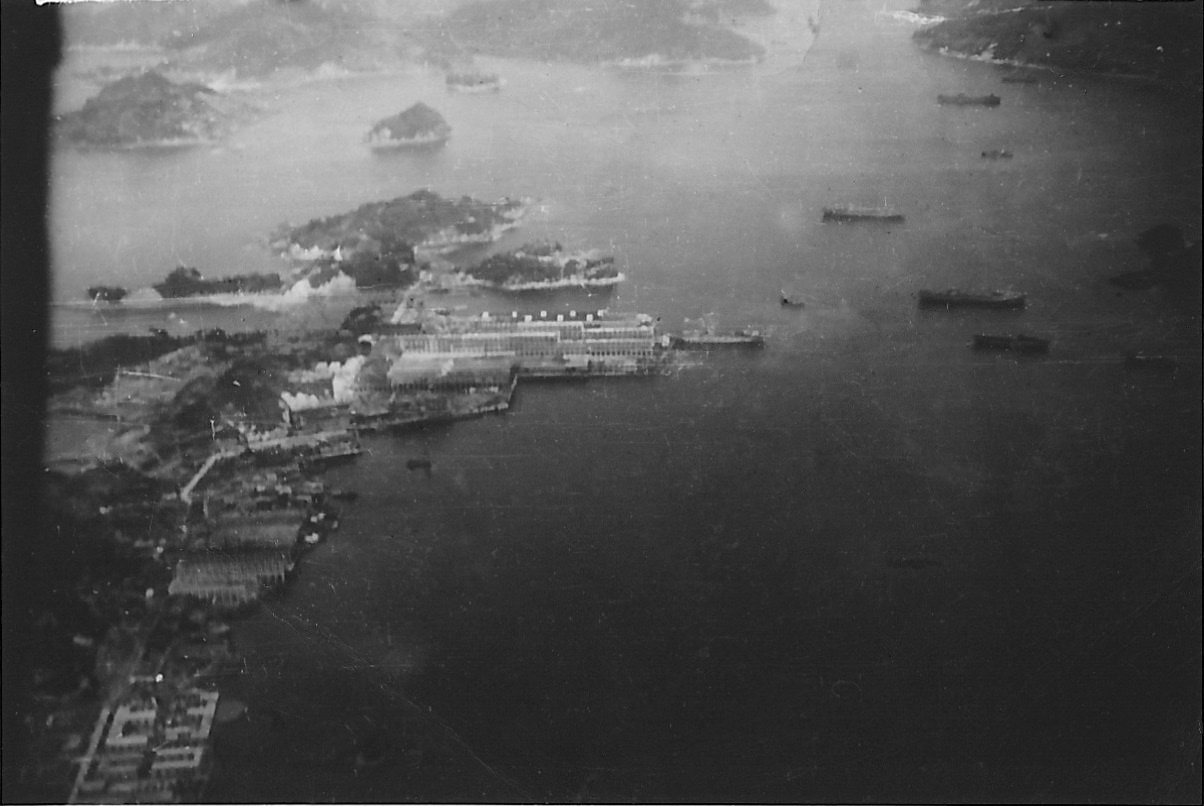
The harbor at Nagasaki in August 1945 before the city was hit with the atomic bomb

In contrast to Hiroshima, almost all of the buildings were of old-fashioned Japanese construction, consisting of timber or timber-framed buildings with timber walls (with or without plaster) and tile roofs. Many of the smaller industries and business establishments were also situated in buildings of timber or other materials not designed to withstand explosions. Nagasaki had been permitted to grow for many years without conforming to any definite city zoning plan; residences were erected adjacent to factory buildings and to each other almost as closely as possible throughout the entire industrial valley. On the day of the bombing, an estimated 263,000 people were in Nagasaki, including 240,000 Japanese residents, 10,000 Korean residents, 2,500 conscripted Korean workers, 9,000 Japanese soldiers, 600 conscripted Chinese workers, and 400 Allied prisoners of war in a camp to the north of Nagasaki.

=== Bombing of Nagasaki ===
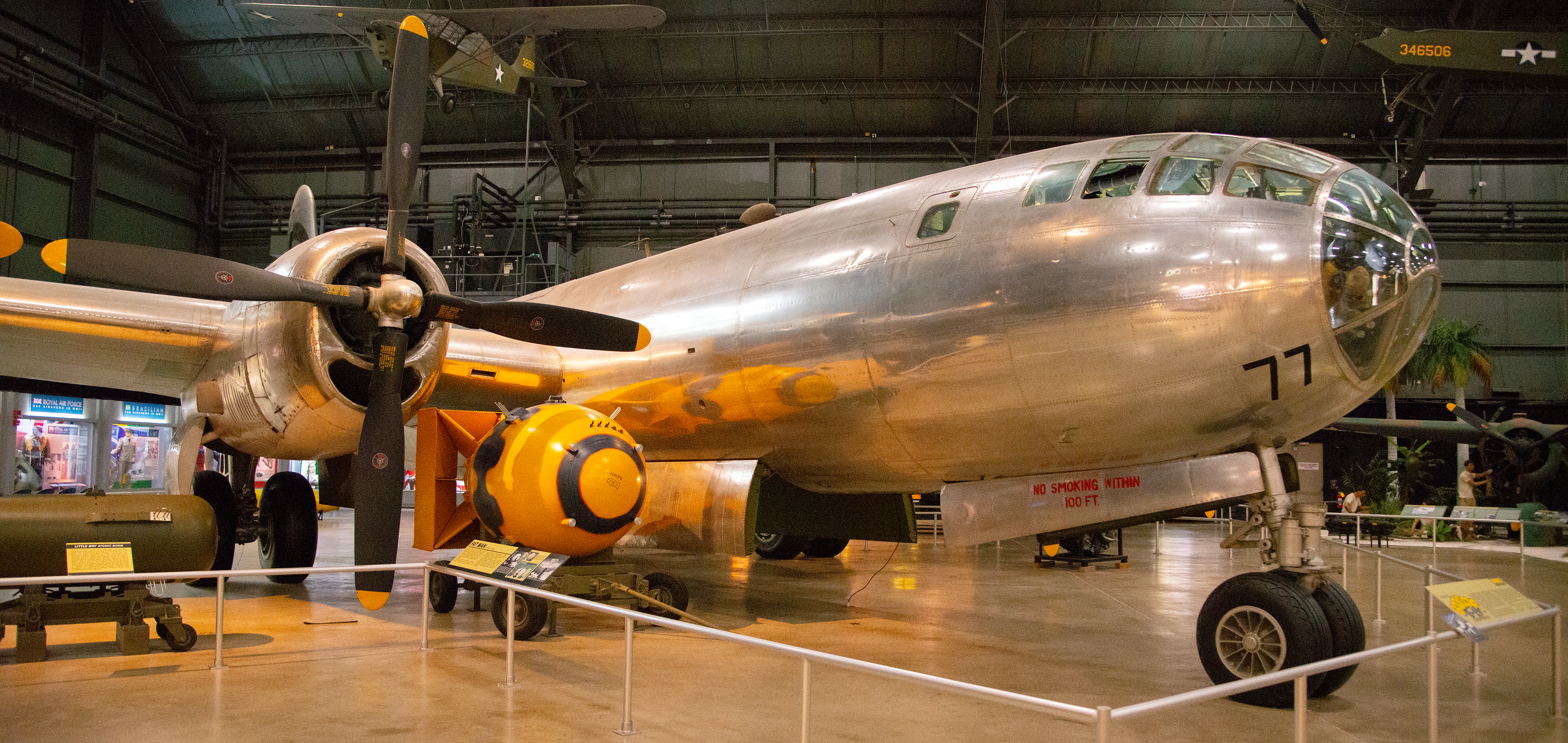
The Bockscar B-29 and a post-war Mk III nuclear weapon painted to resemble the Fat Man bomb, at the National Museum of the United States Air Force, Dayton, Ohio

According to a crew member, Hiroshima had been "the perfect mission" where everything went right, whereas in the Nagasaki mission, almost everything would go wrong.

Responsibility for the timing of the second bombing was delegated to Tibbets. Scheduled for 11 August, the raid was moved earlier by two days to avoid a five-day period of bad weather forecast to begin on 10 August. Three bomb pre-assemblies had been transported to Tinian, labeled F-31, F-32, and F-33 on their exteriors. On 8 August, a dress rehearsal was conducted off Tinian by Sweeney using Bockscar as the drop airplane. Assembly F-33 was expended testing the components and F-31 was designated for the 9 August mission.

Special Mission 16, secondary target Nagasaki, 9 August 1945
Aircraft	Pilot	Call sign	Mission role
Enola Gay	Captain George W. Marquardt	Dimples 82	Weather reconnaissance (Kokura)
Laggin' Dragon	Captain Charles F. McKnight	Dimples 95	Weather reconnaissance (Nagasaki)
Bockscar	Major Charles W. Sweeney	Dimples 77	Weapon delivery
The Great Artiste	Captain Frederick C. Bock	Dimples 89	Blast measurement instrumentation
Big Stink	Major James I. Hopkins, Jr.	Dimples 90	Strike observation and photography
Full House	Major Ralph R. Taylor	Dimples 83	Strike spare – did not complete mission

At 03:47 Tinian time (GMT+10), 02:47 Japanese time, on the morning of 9 August 1945, Bockscar, flown by Sweeney's crew, lifted off from Tinian island with the Fat Man, with Kokura as the primary target and Nagasaki the secondary target. The mission plan for the second attack was nearly identical to that of the Hiroshima mission, with two B-29s flying an hour ahead as weather scouts and two additional B-29s in Sweeney's flight for instrumentation and photographic support of the mission. Sweeney took off with his weapon partially armed, but with the electrical safety plugs still engaged; arming was completed a few minutes after takeoff.

During pre-flight inspection of Bockscar, the flight engineer notified Sweeney that an inoperative fuel transfer pump made it impossible to use 2,400 liters (640 U.S. gal) of fuel carried in a reserve tank. This fuel would still have to be carried all the way to Japan and back, consuming still more fuel. Replacing the pump would take hours; moving the Fat Man to another aircraft might take just as long and was dangerous as well, as the bomb was live. Tibbets and Sweeney therefore elected to have Bockscar continue the mission as the reserve fuel was not expected to be needed.

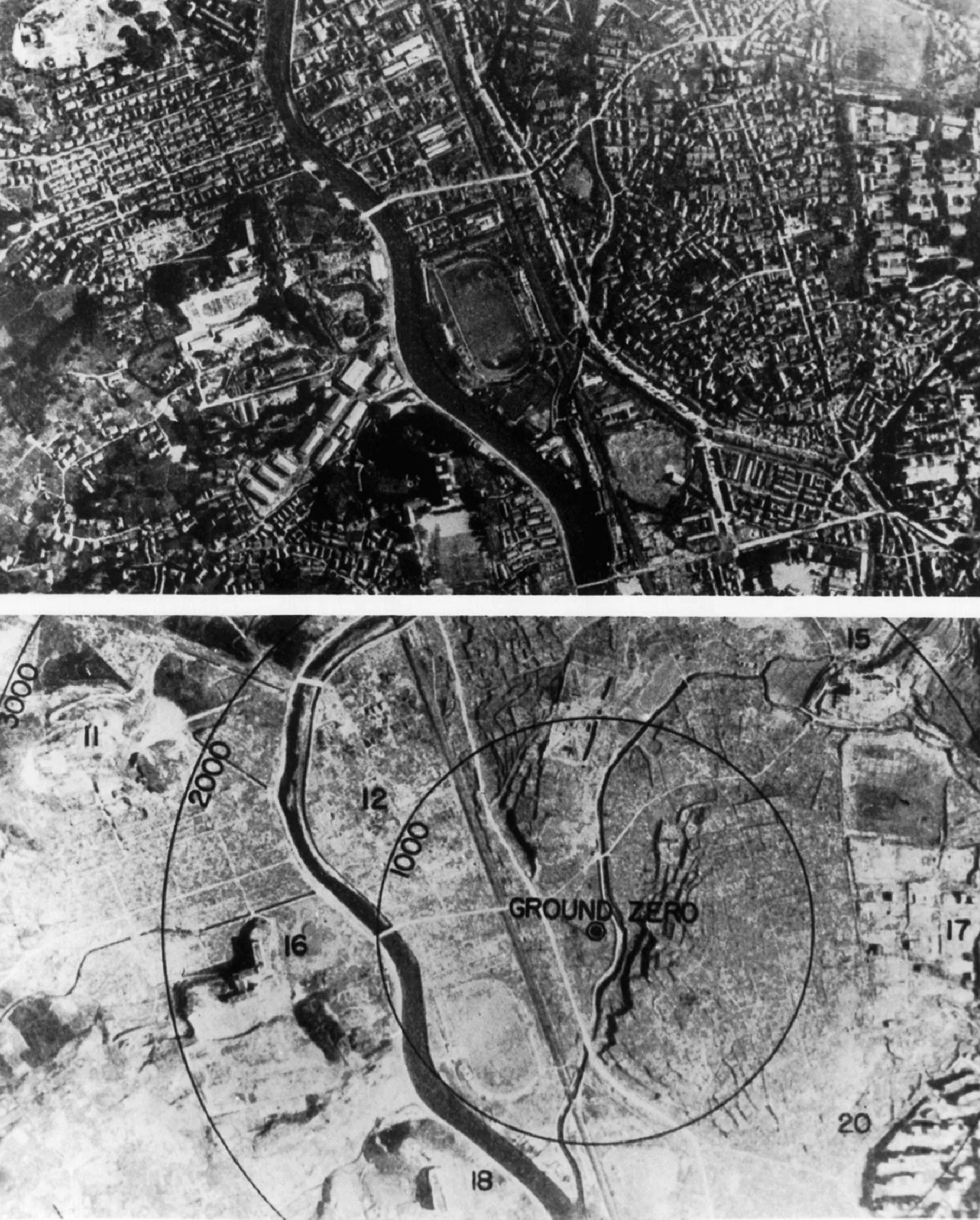
Nagasaki before and after the bombing, after the fires had burned out

This time Penney and Cheshire were allowed to accompany the mission, flying as observers on the third plane, Big Stink, flown by the group's operations officer, Major James I. Hopkins, Jr. Observers aboard the weather planes reported both targets clear. The aircraft ran into thunderstorms, with the fully armed bomb on board. Unexpectedly a white light on the bomb control panel came on that normally illuminates when the bomb is about to be dropped, making the crew think it might detonate, but it was traced to a misplaced switch.

When Sweeney's aircraft arrived at the assembly point for his flight off the coast of Japan, Big Stink failed to make the rendezvous. According to Cheshire, Hopkins was at varying heights including 2,700 meters (9,000 ft) higher than he should have been, and was not flying tight circles over Yakushima as previously agreed with Sweeney and Captain Frederick C. Bock, who was piloting the support B-29 The Great Artiste. Instead, Hopkins was flying 64-kilometer (40 mi) dogleg patterns. Though ordered not to circle longer than fifteen minutes, Sweeney continued to wait for Big Stink for forty minutes. Before leaving the rendezvous point, Sweeney consulted Ashworth, who was in charge of the bomb. As commander of the aircraft, Sweeney made the decision to proceed to the primary, the city of Kokura. After exceeding the original departure time limit by nearly a half-hour, Bockscar, accompanied by The Great Artiste, proceeded to Kokura, thirty minutes away. The delay at the rendezvous had resulted in clouds and drifting smoke over Kokura from fires started by a major firebombing raid by 224 B-29s on nearby Yahata the previous day. Additionally, the Yahata Steel Works intentionally burned coal tar to produce black smoke. The clouds and smoke resulted in 70 percent of the area over Kokura being covered, obscuring the aiming point. Three bomb runs were made over the next 50 minutes, burning fuel and exposing the aircraft repeatedly to the heavy defenses around Kokura, but the bombardier was unable to drop visually. By the time of the third bomb run, Japanese anti-aircraft fire was getting close, and Second Lieutenant Jacob Beser, who was monitoring Japanese communications, reported activity on the Japanese fighter direction radio bands.

With fuel running low because of delays and the bad weather, with reserve fuel unavailable due to the failed pump, Bockscar and The Great Artiste headed for their secondary target, Nagasaki. Fuel consumption calculations made en route indicated that Bockscar had insufficient fuel to reach Iwo Jima and would be forced to divert to Okinawa, which had become entirely Allied-occupied territory only six weeks earlier. After initially deciding that if Nagasaki were obscured on their arrival the crew would carry the bomb to Okinawa and dispose of it in the ocean if necessary, Ashworth agreed with Sweeney's suggestion that a radar approach would be used if the target was obscured. At about 07:50 Japanese time (GMT+9), an air raid alert was sounded in Nagasaki, but the "all clear" signal was given at 08:30. When only two B-29 Superfortresses were sighted at 10:53 no further alarm was given; the Japanese apparently assumed that the planes were only conducting reconnaissance.

A few minutes later, at 11:00 Japanese time, The Great Artiste dropped instruments attached to three parachutes. These instruments also contained an unsigned letter to Ryōkichi Sagane, a physicist at the University of Tokyo who had studied with three of the scientists responsible for the atomic bomb at the University of California, Berkeley, urging him to tell the public about the danger involved with these weapons of mass destruction. The messages were found by military authorities but not turned over to Sagane until a month later. In 1949, one of the authors of the letter, Luis Alvarez, met with Sagane and signed the letter.

At 11:01, a last-minute break in the clouds over Nagasaki allowed Bockscar's bombardier, Captain Kermit Beahan, to visually sight the target as ordered. The Fat Man weapon, containing a core of about 5 kg (11 lb) of plutonium, was dropped over the city's industrial valley. It exploded 47 seconds later at 11:02 at 503 ± 10 m (1,650 ± 33 ft), above a tennis court, halfway between the Mitsubishi Steel and Arms Works in the south and the Nagasaki Arsenal in the north, nearly 3 km (1.9 mi) northwest of the planned hypocenter. By a bizarre coincidence, Fat Man detonated almost directly over the factory that had made the torpedoes used in the Japanese attack on Pearl Harbor. The blast was confined to the Urakami Valley, and a major portion of the city was protected by the intervening hills. The resulting explosion released the equivalent energy of 21 ± 2 kt (87.9 ± 8.4 TJ). Big Stink spotted the explosion from 160 kilometers (100 mi) away, and flew over to observe.

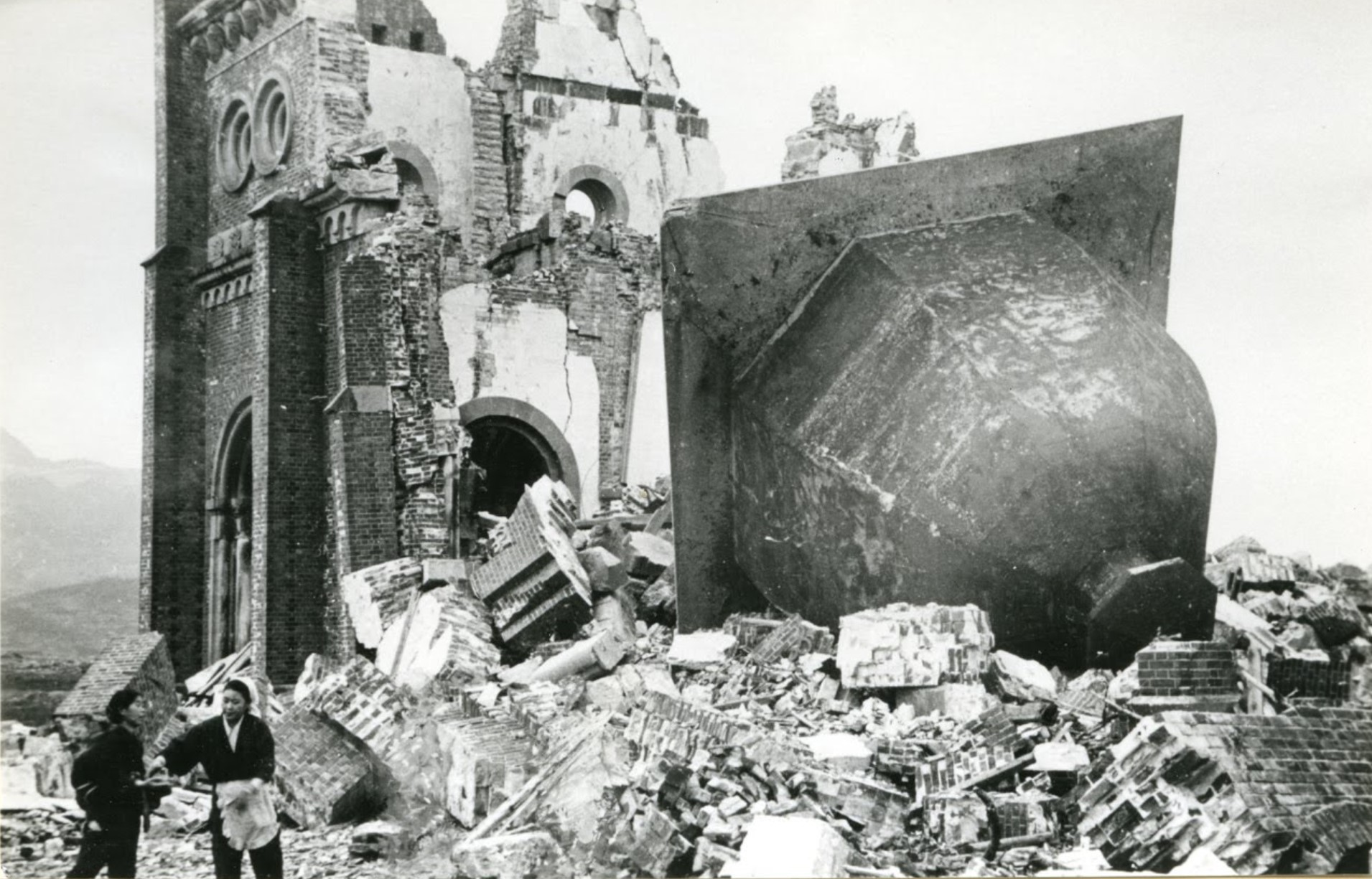
The bomb destroyed the Roman Catholic Urakami Tenshudo Church.

Bockscar flew on to Okinawa, arriving unannounced with only sufficient fuel for a single approach. Sweeney tried repeatedly to contact the control tower for landing clearance, but received no answer. He could see heavy air traffic landing and taking off from Yontan Airfield. Firing off every flare on board to alert the field to his emergency landing, the Bockscar came in fast, landing at 230 km/h (140 mph) instead of the normal 190 kilometers per hour (120 mph). The number two engine died from fuel starvation as he began the final approach. Touching down on only three engines midway down the landing strip, Bockscar bounced up into the air again for about 7.6 meters (25 ft) before slamming back down hard. The heavy B-29 slewed left and towards a row of parked B-24 bombers before the pilots managed to regain control. Its reversible propellers were insufficient to slow the aircraft adequately, and with both pilots standing on the brakes, Bockscar made a swerving 90-degree turn at the end of the runway to avoid running off it. A second engine died from fuel exhaustion before the plane came to a stop. Unlike the heroes' welcome for Enola Gay there was nobody to greet them; nobody knew they were coming.

Following the mission, there was confusion over the identification of the plane. The first eyewitness account by war correspondent William L. Laurence of The New York Times, who accompanied the mission aboard the aircraft piloted by Bock, reported that Sweeney was leading the mission in The Great Artiste. He also noted its "Victor" number as 77, which was that of Bockscar. Laurence had interviewed Sweeney and his crew, and was aware that they referred to their airplane as The Great Artiste. Except for Enola Gay, none of the 393rd's B-29s had yet had names painted on the noses, a fact which Laurence himself noted in his account. Unaware of the switch in aircraft, Laurence assumed Victor 77 was The Great Artiste, which was in fact, Victor 89.

=== Events on the ground ===
Although the bomb was more powerful than the one used on Hiroshima, its effects were confined by hillsides to the narrow Urakami Valley. Of 7,500 Japanese employees who worked inside the Mitsubishi Munitions plant, including "mobilized" students and regular workers, 6,200 were killed. Some 17,000–22,000 others who worked in other war plants and factories in the city died as well. The 1946 Manhattan Project report estimated 39,000 dead and 25,000 injured, and the 1951 U.S.-led Joint Commission report estimated 39,214 dead and 25,153 injured; Japanese-led reconsiderations in the 1970s estimated 70,000 dead in Nagasaki by the end of the year. A modern estimate by the Radiation Effects Research Foundation (RERF) estimates a city population of 250,000 to 270,000 at the time of the bombing, of which 60,000 to 80,000 died by the end of the year.

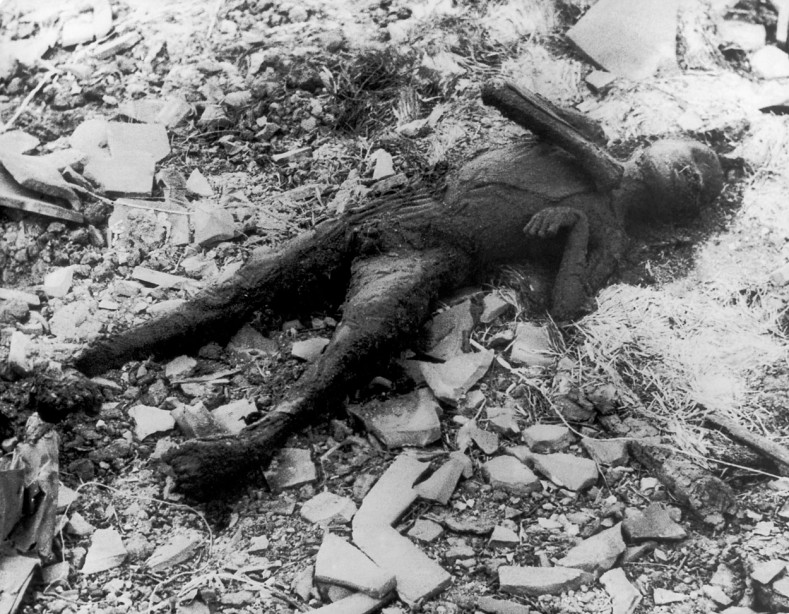
Yōsuke Yamahata photographed this child incinerated in Nagasaki. American forces censored such images in Japan until 1952.

Unlike Hiroshima's military death toll, only 150 Japanese soldiers were killed instantly, including 36 from the 134th AAA Regiment of the 4th AAA Division. At least eight Allied prisoners of war (POWs)—British Royal Air Force Corporal Ronald Shaw, and seven Dutch POWs—were killed, and as many as thirteen may have died. American POW Joe Kieyoomia survived, reportedly having been shielded from the effects of the bomb by the concrete walls of his cell. The 24 Australian POWs in Nagasaki survived.

The radius of total destruction was about 1.6 km (1 mi), followed by fires across the northern portion of the city to 3.2 km (2 mi) south of the bomb. The Nagasaki Arsenal was destroyed in the blast. About 58 percent of the Mitsubishi Arms Plant and about 78 percent of the Mitsubishi Steel Works were damaged. The Mitsubishi Electric Works, on the border of the main destruction zone, suffered only 10 percent structural damage. Many fires burnt after the bombing, but no firestorm developed, unlike at Hiroshima, as the damaged areas had insufficient fuel density. Instead, ambient wind pushed the fire to spread along the valley. Had the bomb been dropped at the intended target, in the heart of Nagasaki's downtown historic district, the destruction to medical and administrative infrastructure would have been greater.

As in Hiroshima, the bombing badly damaged the city's medical facilities. A makeshift hospital was established at the Shinkozen Primary School, which served as the main medical center. The trains kept running and evacuated many victims to hospitals in nearby towns. A medical team from a naval hospital reached the city in the evening. Fire-fighting brigades from the neighboring towns assisted in fighting the fires. Takashi Nagai, a seriously injured doctor working in the radiology department of Nagasaki Medical College Hospital, and the rest of the surviving medical staff treated bombing victims.

The atomic bomb explosion generated a windstorm several kilometers wide that carried ash, dust, and debris over the mountain ranges surrounding Nagasaki. Approximately 20 minutes after the bombing, a black rain fell with the consistency of mud or oil. The rain carried radioactive material and continued for one to two hours.

== Plans for more atomic attacks on Japan ==
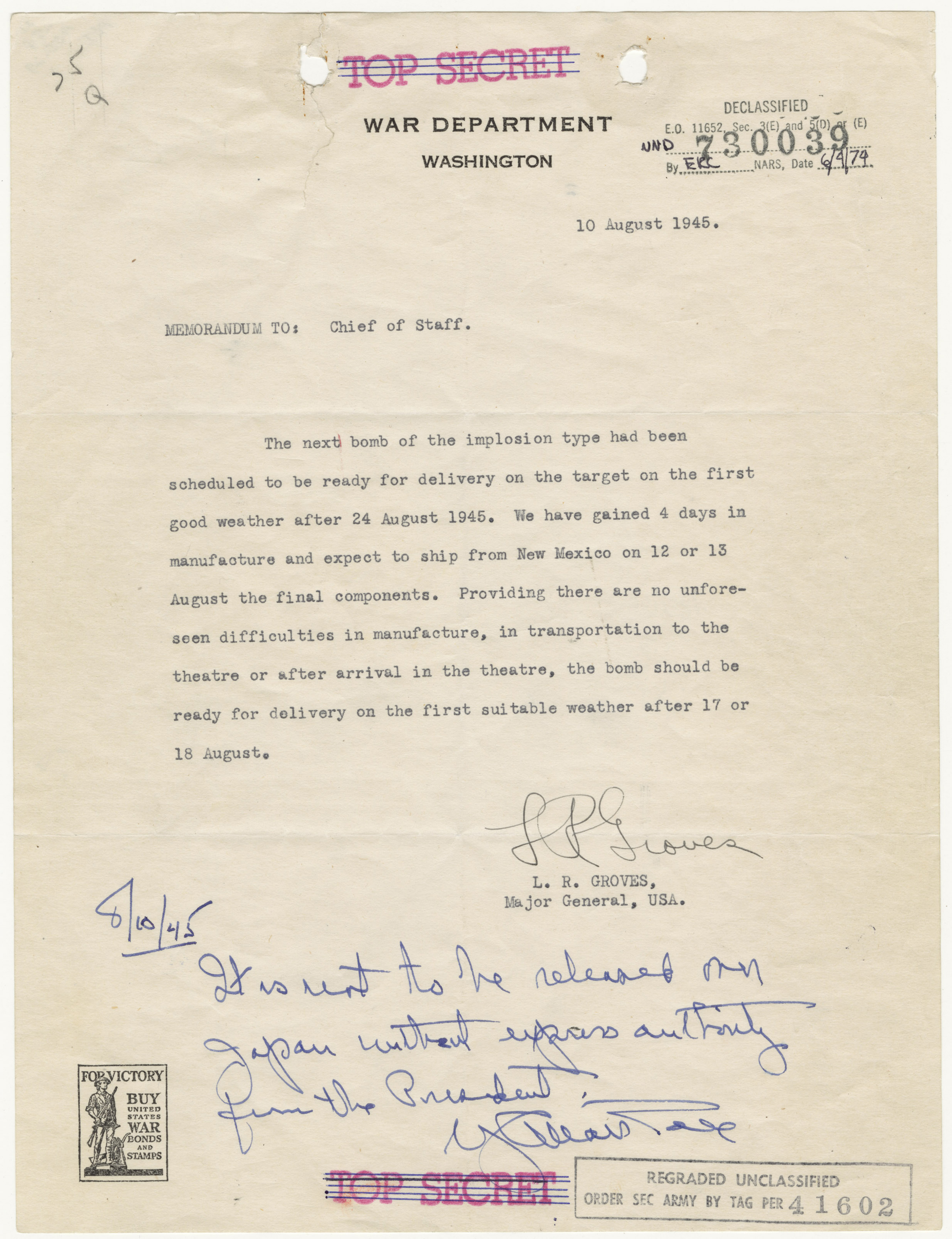
Memorandum from Leslie Groves to George C. Marshall regarding the third bomb, with Marshall's hand-written caveat that the third bomb not be used without express presidential instruction

There were plans for further attacks on Japan following Hiroshima and Nagasaki. Groves expected to have another (plutonium-239-based) "Fat Man" atomic bomb ready for use on 19 August, with three more in September and a further three in October. A second Little Boy bomb (using uranium-235) would not be available until December 1945. On 10 August, he sent a memorandum to Marshall in which he wrote that "the next bomb ... should be ready for delivery on the first suitable weather after 17 or 18 August." The memo contains a hand-written comment written by Marshall: "It is not to be released over Japan without express authority from the President."

At the cabinet meeting that morning, Truman discussed these actions. James Forrestal paraphrased Truman as saying "there will be no further dropping of the atomic bomb," while Henry A. Wallace recorded in his diary that: "Truman said he had given orders to stop atomic bombing. He said the thought of wiping out another 100,000 people was too horrific. He didn't like the idea of killing, as he said, 'all those kids.'" The previous order that the target cities were to be attacked with atomic bombs "as made ready" was thus modified. There was already discussion in the War Department about conserving the bombs then in production for Operation Downfall, and Marshall suggested to Stimson that the remaining cities on the target list be spared attack with atomic bombs. On 13 August, General John E. Hull and Colonel Lyle Seeman discussed the usage of the upcoming weapons, favouring "tactical use" in support of an invasion, dropped two to three days prior to U.S. troop capture or amphibious landing, as opposed to continuation of strategic attacks.

Two more Fat Man assemblies were readied, and scheduled to leave Kirtland Field for Tinian on 11 and 14 August, and Tibbets was ordered by LeMay to return to Albuquerque, New Mexico, to collect them. At Los Alamos, technicians worked 24 hours straight to cast another plutonium core. Although cast, it still needed to be pressed and coated, which would take until 16 August. Therefore, it could have been ready for use on 19 August. Unable to reach Marshall, Groves ordered on his own authority on 13 August that the core not be shipped.

== Surrender of Japan and subsequent occupation ==
Until 9 August, Japan's war council still insisted on its four conditions for surrender. The full cabinet met at 14:30 on 9 August, and spent most of the day debating surrender. Anami conceded that victory was unlikely, but argued in favor of continuing the war. The meeting ended at 17:30, with no decision having been reached. Suzuki went to the palace to report on the outcome of the meeting, where he met with Kōichi Kido, the Lord Keeper of the Privy Seal of Japan. Kido informed him that the emperor had agreed to hold an imperial conference, and gave a strong indication that the emperor would consent to surrender on condition that kokutai be preserved. A second cabinet meeting was held at 18:00. Only four ministers supported Anami's position of adhering to the four conditions, but since cabinet decisions had to be unanimous, no decision was reached before it ended at 22:00.

Calling an imperial conference required the signatures of the prime minister and the two service chiefs, but the Chief Cabinet Secretary Hisatsune Sakomizu had already obtained signatures from Toyoda and General Yoshijirō Umezu in advance, and he reneged on his promise to inform them if a meeting was to be held. The meeting commenced at 23:50. No consensus had emerged by 02:00 on 10 August, but the emperor gave his "sacred decision", authorizing the Foreign Minister, Shigenori Tōgō, to notify the Allies that Japan would accept their terms on one condition, that the declaration "does not comprise any demand which prejudices the prerogatives of His Majesty as a Sovereign ruler."

On 12 August, the Emperor informed the imperial family of his decision to surrender. One of his uncles, Prince Asaka, asked whether the war would be continued if the kokutai could not be preserved. Hirohito simply replied, "Of course." As the Allied terms seemed to leave intact the principle of the preservation of the Throne, Hirohito recorded on 14 August his capitulation announcement which was broadcast to the Japanese nation the next day despite an attempted military coup d'état by militarists opposed to the surrender.

In his declaration's fifth paragraph, Hirohito solely mentions the duration of the conflict; and did not explicitly mention the Soviets as a factor for surrender:

But now the war has lasted for nearly four years. Despite the best that has been done by every one—the gallant fighting of military and naval forces, the diligence and assiduity of Our servants of the State and the devoted service of Our one hundred million people, the war situation has developed not necessarily to Japan's advantage, while the general trends of the world have all turned against her interest.

The sixth paragraph by Hirohito specifically mentions the use of nuclear ordnance devices, from the aspect of the unprecedented damage they caused:

Moreover, the enemy has begun to employ a new and most cruel bomb, the power of which to do damage is, indeed, incalculable, taking the toll of many innocent lives. Should we continue to fight, not only would it result in an ultimate collapse and obliteration of the Japanese nation, but also it would lead to the total extinction of human civilization.

The seventh paragraph gives the reason for the ending of hostilities against the Allies:

Such being the case, how are we to save the millions of our subjects, or to atone ourselves before the hallowed spirits of our imperial ancestors? This is the reason why we have ordered the acceptance of the provisions of the joint declaration of the powers.

In his "Rescript to the Soldiers and Sailors" delivered on 17 August, Hirohito did not refer to the atomic bombs or possible human extinction, and instead described the Soviet declaration of war as "endangering the very foundation of the Empire's existence."

Three weeks after the bombings, Tibbets decided to visit Hiroshima with some of his team, but landed at Nagasaki instead as Hiroshima's airfield was unusable. They arrived before any American troops and drove into the city, which they found eerie. They were amazed at all the destruction from just one bomb—"It scares the hell out of you".

== Reportage ==
The front page of Chicago Daily Tribune dated 8 August 1945. The cartoon refers back to the Japanese attack on Pearl Harbor to rationalize the American atomic bombing.

The Hiroshima ruins in March and April 1946, by Daniel A. McGovern and Harry Mimura

On 10 August 1945, the day after the Nagasaki bombing, military photographer Yōsuke Yamahata, correspondent Higashi, and artist Yamada arrived in the city with instructions to record the destruction for propaganda purposes. Yamahata took scores of photographs, and on 21 August, they appeared in Mainichi Shimbun, a popular Japanese newspaper. After Japan's surrender and the arrival of American forces, copies of his photographs were seized amid the ensuing censorship, but some records have survived.

Leslie Nakashima, a former United Press (UP) journalist, filed the first personal account of the scene to appear in American newspapers. He observed that large numbers of survivors continued to die from what later became recognized as radiation poisoning. On 31 August, The New York Times published an abbreviated version of his 27 August UP article. Nearly all references to uranium poisoning were omitted. An editor's note was added to say that, according to American scientists, "the atomic bomb will not have any lingering after-effects."

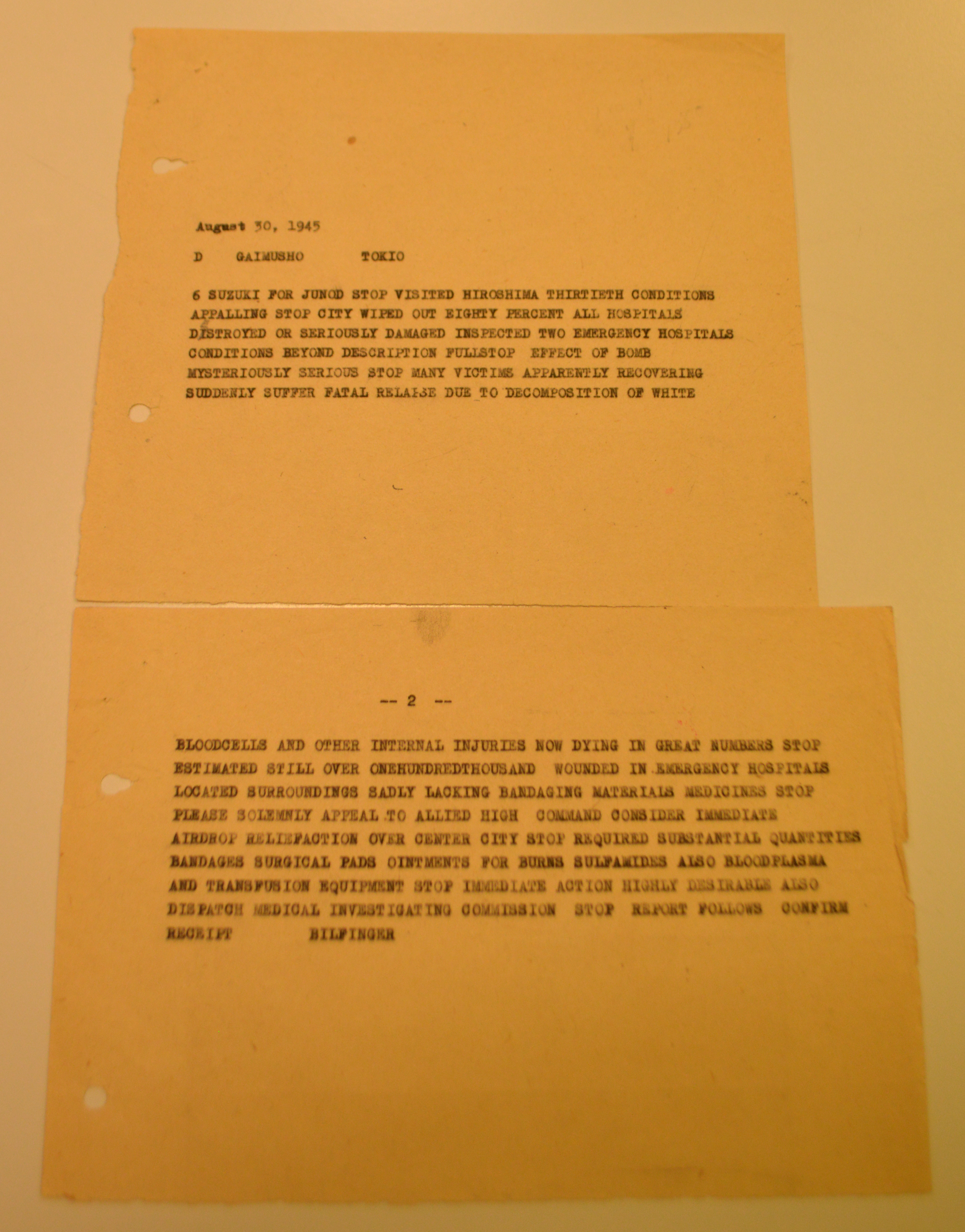
A telegram sent by Fritz Bilfinger, delegate of the International Committee of the Red Cross (ICRC), on 30 August 1945 from Hiroshima

Wilfred Burchett was also one of the first Western journalists to visit Hiroshima after the bombing. He arrived alone by train from Tokyo on 2 September, defying the traveling ban put in place on Western correspondents. Burchett's dispatch, "The Atomic Plague", was printed by the Daily Express newspaper in London on 5 September 1945. The reports from Nakashima and Burchett informed the public for the first time of the gruesome effects of radiation and nuclear fallout—radiation burns and radiation poisoning, sometimes lasting more than thirty days after the blast. Burchett especially noted that people were dying "horribly" after bleeding from orifices, and their flesh would rot away from the injection holes where vitamin A was administered, to no avail.

The New York Times then apparently reversed course and ran a front-page story by Bill Lawrence confirming the existence of a terrifying affliction in Hiroshima, where many had symptoms such as hair loss and vomiting blood before dying. Lawrence had gained access to the city as part of a press junket promoting the U.S. Army Air Force. Some reporters were horrified by the scene, referring to what they saw as a "death laboratory" littered with "human guinea pigs". General MacArthur found the reporting to have turned from good PR into bad PR and threatened to court martial the entire group. He withdrew Burchett's press accreditation and expelled the journalist from the occupation zones. The authorities also accused him of being under the sway of Japanese propaganda and later suppressed another story, on the Nagasaki bombing, by George Weller of the Chicago Daily News. Less than a week after his New York Times story was published, Lawrence also backtracked and dismissed the reports on radiation sickness as Japanese efforts to undermine American morale.

A member of the United States Strategic Bombing Survey, Lieutenant Daniel A. McGovern, arrived in September 1945 to document the effects of the bombing of Japan. He used a film crew to document the effects of the bombings in early 1946. The film crew shot 27,000 m (90,000 ft) of film, resulting in a three-hour documentary titled The Effects of the Atomic Bombs Against Hiroshima and Nagasaki. The documentary included images from hospitals, burned-out buildings and cars, and rows of skulls and bones on the ground. It was classified "secret" for the next 22 years.

Motion picture company Nippon Eigasha started sending cameramen to Nagasaki and Hiroshima in September 1945. On 24 October 1945, a U.S. military policeman stopped a Nippon Eigasha cameraman from continuing to film in Nagasaki. All Nippon Eigasha's reels were confiscated by the American authorities, but they were requested by the Japanese government, and declassified. The public release of film footage of the city post-attack, and some research about the effects of the attack, was restricted during the occupation of Japan, but the Hiroshima-based magazine, Chugoku Bunka, in its first issue published on 10 March 1946, devoted itself to detailing the damage from the bombing.

The book Hiroshima, written by Pulitzer Prize winner John Hersey and originally published in article form in The New Yorker, is reported to have reached Tokyo in English by January 1947, and the translated version was released in Japan in 1949. It narrated the stories of the lives of six bomb survivors from immediately prior to, and months after, the dropping of the Little Boy bomb. Beginning in 1974, a compilation of drawings and artwork made by the survivors of the bombings began to be compiled, with completion in 1977, and under both book and exhibition format, it was titled The Unforgettable Fire.

Life among the rubble in Hiroshima in March and April 1946. Film footage taken by Lieutenant Daniel A. McGovern (director) and Harry Mimura (cameraman) for a United States Strategic Bombing Survey project.

The bombing amazed Otto Hahn and other German atomic scientists, whom the British held at Farm Hall in Operation Epsilon. Hahn stated that he had not believed an atomic weapon "would be possible for another twenty years"; Werner Heisenberg did not believe the news at first. Carl Friedrich von Weizsäcker said "I think it's dreadful of the Americans to have done it. I think it is madness on their part", but Heisenberg replied, "One could equally well say 'That's the quickest way of ending the war'". Hahn was grateful that the German project had not succeeded in developing "such an inhumane weapon"; Karl Wirtz observed that even if it had, "we would have obliterated London but would still not have conquered the world, and then they would have dropped them on us".

Hahn told the others, "Once I wanted to suggest that all uranium should be sunk to the bottom of the ocean". The Vatican agreed; L'Osservatore Romano expressed regret that the bomb's inventors did not destroy the weapon for the benefit of humanity. Rev. Cuthbert Thicknesse, the dean of St Albans, prohibited using St Albans Abbey for a thanksgiving service for the war's end, calling the use of atomic weapons "an act of wholesale, indiscriminate massacre".

News of the atomic bombing was greeted more positively in the U.S.; a poll in Fortune magazine in late 1945 showed a significant minority of Americans (23 percent) wishing that more atomic bombs could have been dropped on Japan. The initial positive response was supported by the imagery presented to the public (mainly the powerful images of the mushroom cloud); at this time it was usual in the U.S. not to use graphic images of death.

== Post-attack casualties ==
Silent film footage taken in Hiroshima in March 1946 showing survivors with severe burns and keloid scars. Survivors were asked to stand in the orientation they were in at the time of the flash, to document and convey the line-of-sight nature of flash burns, and to show that, much like a sunburn, thick clothing and fabric offered protection in many cases. The sometimes extensive burn scar contracture is not unusual, being common to all second- and third-degree burns when they cover a large area of skin.

An estimated 90,000 to 166,000 people in Hiroshima (between 26 and 49 percent of its population) and 60,000 to 80,000 people in Nagasaki (between 22 and 32 percent of its population) died in 1945, of which a majority in each case were killed on the days of the bombings, due to the force and heat of the blasts themselves. Nearly all of the remainder of victims died within two to four months, due to radiation exposure and resulting complications.

One Atomic Bomb Casualty Commission (ABCC) report discusses 6,882 people examined in Hiroshima and 6,621 people examined in Nagasaki, who were largely within 2,000 meters (6,600 ft) of the hypocenter, who suffered injuries from the blast and heat but died from complications frequently compounded by acute radiation syndrome (ARS), all within about 20 to 30 days. Many people not injured by the blast eventually died within that timeframe as well after suffering from ARS. At the time, the doctors had no idea what the cause was and were unable to effectively treat the condition.

Midori Naka was the first death officially certified to be the result of radiation poisoning or, as it was referred to by many, the "atomic bomb disease". She was some 650 meters (2,130 ft) from the hypocenter at Hiroshima and would die on 24 August 1945 after traveling to Tokyo. It was unappreciated at the time but the average radiation dose that would kill approximately 50 percent of adults (the LD50) was approximately halved; that is, smaller doses were made more lethal when the individual experienced concurrent blast or burn polytraumatic injuries. Conventional skin injuries that cover a large area frequently result in bacterial infection; the risk of sepsis and death is increased when a usually non-lethal radiation dose moderately suppresses the white blood cell count.

In the spring of 1948, the ABCC was established in accordance with a presidential directive from Truman to the National Academy of Sciences–National Research Council to conduct investigations of the late effects of radiation among the survivors in Hiroshima and Nagasaki. In 1956, the ABCC published The Effect of Exposure to the Atomic Bombs on Pregnancy Termination in Hiroshima and Nagasaki. The ABCC became the Radiation Effects Research Foundation (RERF) on 1 April 1975. A binational organization run by both the United States and Japan, the RERF is still in operation today.

=== Cancer increases ===
Cancers do not immediately emerge after exposure to radiation; instead, radiation-induced cancer has a minimum latency period of some five years and above, and leukemia some two years and above, peaking around six to eight years later. Jarrett Foley published the first major reports on the significant increased incidence of the latter among survivors. Almost all cases of leukemia over the following 50 years were in people exposed to more than 1Gy. In a strictly dependent manner dependent on their distance from the hypocenter, in the 1987 Life Span Study, conducted by the Radiation Effects Research Foundation, a statistical excess of 507 cancers, of undefined lethality, were observed in 79,972 hibakusha who had still been living between 1958 and 1987 and who took part in the study.

As the epidemiology study continues with time, the RERF estimates that, from 1950 to 2000, 46 percent of leukemia deaths which may include Sadako Sasaki and 11 percent of solid cancers of unspecified lethality were likely due to radiation from the bombs or some other post-attack city effects, with the statistical excess being 200 leukemia deaths and 1,700 solid cancers of undeclared lethality. Both of these statistics being derived from the observation of approximately half of the total survivors, strictly those who took part in the study. A meta-analysis from 2016 found that radiation exposure increases cancer risk, but also that the average lifespan of survivors was reduced by only a few months compared to those not exposed to radiation.

=== Birth defect investigations ===
While during the preimplantation period, that is one to ten days following conception, intrauterine radiation exposure of "at least 0.2 Gy" can cause complications of implantation and death of the human embryo. One of the early studies conducted by the ABCC was on the outcome of pregnancies occurring in Hiroshima and Nagasaki, and in a control city, Kure, located 29 km (18 mi) south of Hiroshima, to discern the conditions and outcomes related to radiation exposure. James V. Neel led the study which found that the overall number of birth defects was not significantly higher among the children of survivors who were pregnant at the time of the bombings. He also studied the longevity of the children who survived the bombings of Hiroshima and Nagasaki, reporting that between 90 and 95 percent were still living 50 years later.

While the National Academy of Sciences raised the possibility that Neel's procedure did not filter the Kure population for possible radiation exposure which could bias the results, overall, a statistically insignificant increase in birth defects occurred directly after the bombings of Nagasaki and Hiroshima when the cities were taken as wholes, in terms of distance from the hypocenters. However, Neel and others noted that in approximately 50 humans who were of an early gestational age at the time of the bombing and who were all within about 1 kilometer (0.62 mi) of the hypocenter, an increase in microencephaly and anencephaly was observed upon birth, with the incidence of these two particular malformations being nearly three times what was to be expected when compared to the control group in Kure.

In 1985, Johns Hopkins University geneticist James F. Crow examined Neel's research and confirmed that the number of birth defects was not significantly higher in Hiroshima and Nagasaki. Many members of the ABCC and its successor Radiation Effects Research Foundation (RERF) were still looking for possible birth defects among the survivors decades later, but found no evidence that they were significantly common among the survivors or inherited in the children of survivors.

=== Investigations into brain development ===
Despite the small sample size of 1,600 to 1,800 persons who came forth with the criteria that they were: prenatally exposed at the time of the bombings, within a close proximity to one of the two hypocenters, and had survived the in utero absorption of a substantial dose of radiation and then the malnourished post-attack environment, data from this cohort supports the increased risk of severe mental retardation (SMR) that was observed in some 30 individuals, SMR being a common outcome of the aforementioned microencephaly. While the lack of statistical data - with just 30 individuals out of 1,800 - prevents a definitive determination of a threshold point, the data collected suggests a threshold fetal dose for SMR at the most radiosensitive period of cognitive development, when there is the largest number of undifferentiated neural cells (8 to 15 weeks post-conception). The threshold dose begins at approximately 0.09 to 0.15 Gy and thereafter linearly increases to a 43-percent rate of SMR when exposed to a fetal dose of 1 Gy at any point during these weeks of rapid neurogenesis.

None of the subjects who were prenatally exposed to the bombings at a gestational age less than 8 weeks (prior to synaptogenesis) or more than 26 weeks "were observed to be mentally retarded", with the condition therefore being isolated to those solely of 8–26 weeks of age and who absorbed more than approximately 0.09 to 0.15 Gy of prompt radiation energy.

Examination of the prenatally exposed, in terms of IQ performance and school records, showed a statistically significant reduction in both areas when exposed to radiation doses greater than 0.1 to 0.5 Gy during the same gestational period of 8–25 weeks. Outside this period, at less than 8 weeks and greater than 26 after conception, "there is no evidence of a radiation-related effect on scholastic performance."

The reporting of doses in terms of absorbed energy in units of grays and rads – rather than the biologically significant, biologically weighted sievert in both the SMR and cognitive performance data – is typical. The reported threshold dose variance between Hiroshima and Nagasaki's victims is suggested to be a manifestation of the difference between X-ray and neutron absorption, with Little Boy emitting substantially more neutron flux, whereas the Baratol that surrounded the core of Fat Man filtered or shifted the absorbed neutron-radiation profile, so that the dose of radiation energy received in Nagasaki was mostly that from exposure to X-rays/gamma rays. Conversely, within 1,500 meters of the hypocenter at Hiroshima, the in-utero dose depended more on the absorption of neutrons, which have a higher biological effect per unit of energy absorbed. From the work done in radiation dose reconstruction, the estimated dosimetry at Hiroshima still has the larger amount of uncertainty, as the Little Boy bomb design was never tested before deployment or afterward; as such, the estimated radiation profile absorbed by individuals at Hiroshima had required greater reliance on calculations than the Japanese soil, concrete and roof-tile measurements, which began to reach accurate levels and thereby inform researchers in the 1990s.

Many other investigations into cognitive outcomes, such as schizophrenia as a result of prenatal exposure, have been conducted with "no statistically significant linear relationship seen". There is a suggestion that in the most extremely exposed (those who survived within a kilometer or so of the hypocenters), a trend emerges akin to that seen in SMR, though the sample size is too small to determine any significance.

== Hibakusha ==
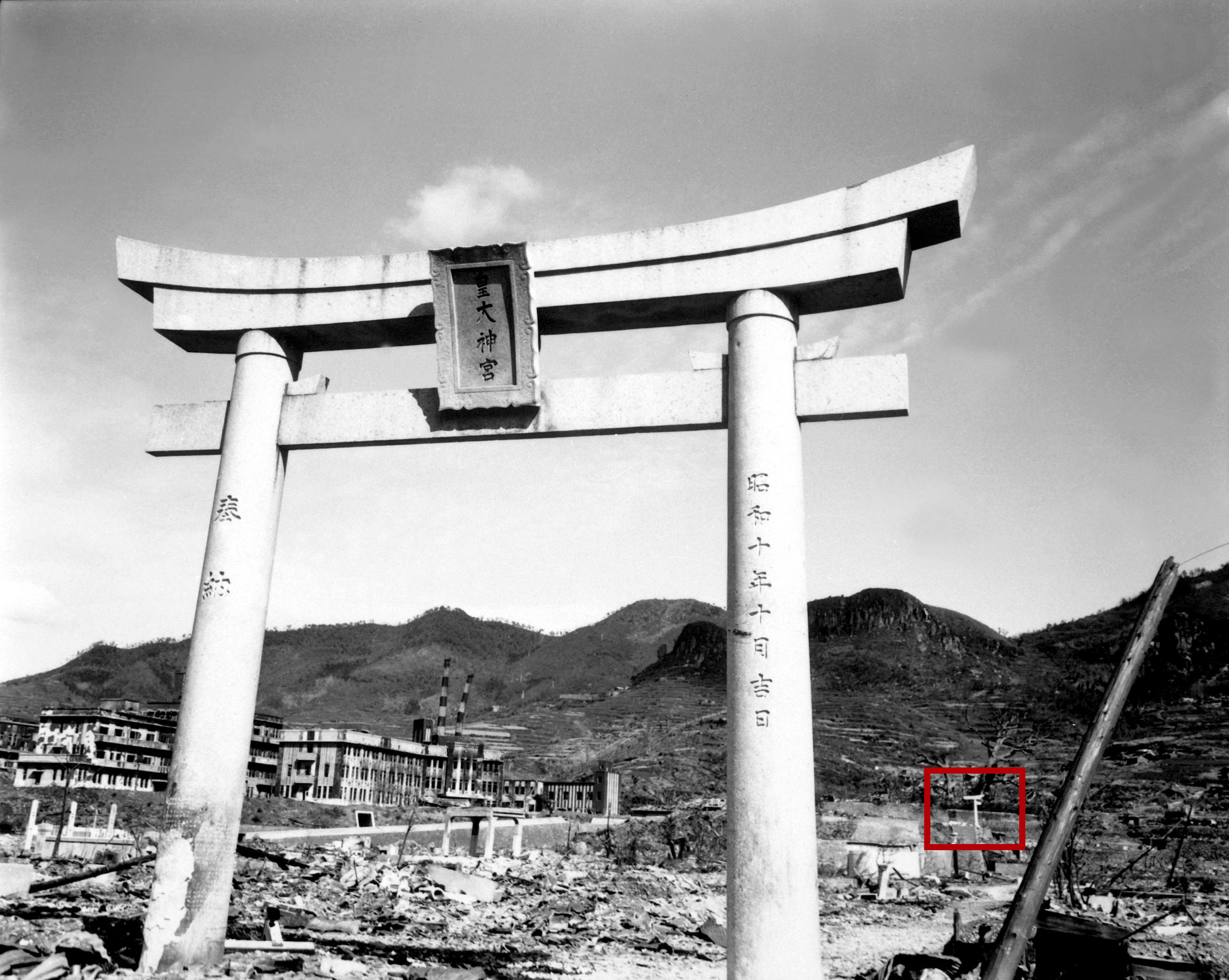
A Torii in Nagasaki, Japan. One-legged torii in the background

The survivors of the bombings are called hibakusha (被爆者; pronounced [çibaꜜkɯ̥ɕa] or [çibakɯ̥ꜜɕa]), a Japanese word that translates to "explosion-affected people". The Japanese government has recognized about 650,000 people as hibakusha. As of 31 March 2026, 91,105 were still alive, mostly in Japan. The government of Japan recognizes about one percent of these as having illnesses caused by radiation. The memorials in Hiroshima and Nagasaki contain lists of the names of the hibakusha who are known to have died since the bombings. Updated annually on the anniversaries of the bombings, as of August 2026, the memorials record the names of more than 550,000 hibakusha; 353,639 in Hiroshima and 204,708 in Nagasaki.

If they discuss their background, hibakusha and their children were (and still are) victims of fear-based discrimination and exclusion for marriage or work due to public ignorance; much of the public persist with the belief that the hibakusha carry some hereditary or even contagious disease. This is despite the fact that no statistically demonstrable increase of birth defects/congenital malformations was found among the later conceived children born to survivors of the nuclear weapons used at Hiroshima and Nagasaki, or has been found in the later conceived children of cancer survivors who had previously received radiotherapy. The surviving women of Hiroshima and Nagasaki, that could conceive, who were exposed to substantial amounts of radiation, had children with no higher incidence of abnormalities/birth defects than the rate which is observed in the Japanese average. A study of the long-term psychological effects of the bombings on the survivors found that even 17–20 years after the bombings had occurred survivors showed a higher prevalence of anxiety and somatization symptoms.

=== Double survivors ===
Perhaps as many as 200 people from Hiroshima sought refuge in Nagasaki. The 2006 documentary Twice Survived: The Doubly Atomic Bombed of Hiroshima and Nagasaki documented 165 nijū hibakusha (lit. double explosion-affected people), nine of whom claimed to be in the blast zone in both cities. On 24 March 2009, the Japanese government officially recognized Tsutomu Yamaguchi as a double hibakusha. He was confirmed to be 3 km (1.9 mi) from ground zero in Hiroshima on a business trip when the bomb was detonated. He was seriously burnt on his left side and spent the night in Hiroshima. He arrived at his home city of Nagasaki on 8 August, the day before the bombing, and he was exposed to residual radiation while searching for his relatives. He was the first officially recognized survivor of both bombings. He died in 2010 of stomach cancer.

=== Korean survivors ===
During the war, Japan brought as many as 670,000 Korean conscripts to Japan to work as forced labor. About 5,000–8,000 Koreans were killed in Hiroshima and 1,500–2,000 in Nagasaki. According to the South Korea Atomic Bomb Victims Association, about 70,000 Koreans were exposed to the bomb. By the end of 1945, some 40,000 (57.1%) had died. The overall rate was about 33.7%. According to a study by the Gyeonggi Welfare Foundation, some survivors were forced to clear rubble and recover bodies. Koreans without local ties remained in the city, exposed to the radioactive fallout and with limited access to medical care, while Japanese evacuees fled to relatives. Korean survivors had a difficult time fighting for the same recognition as hibakusha as afforded to all Japanese survivors, a situation which resulted in the denial of free health benefits to them in Japan. Most issues were eventually addressed in 2008 through lawsuits.

== Memorials ==
=== Hiroshima ===
Hiroshima was subsequently struck by Typhoon Ida on 17 September 1945. More than half the bridges were destroyed, and the roads and railroads were damaged, further devastating the city. The population increased from 83,000 soon after the bombing to 146,000 in February 1946. The city was rebuilt after the war, with help from the national government through the Hiroshima Peace Memorial City Construction Law passed in 1949. It provided financial assistance for reconstruction, along with land donated that was previously owned by the national government and used for military purposes. In 1949, a design was selected for the Hiroshima Peace Memorial Park. Hiroshima Prefectural Industrial Promotion Hall, the closest surviving building to the location of the bomb's detonation, was designated the Hiroshima Peace Memorial. The Hiroshima Peace Memorial Museum was opened in 1955 in the Peace Park. Hiroshima also contains a Peace Pagoda, built in 1966 by Nipponzan-Myōhōji-Daisanga.

On 27 January 1981, the Atomic Bombing Relic Selecting Committee of Hiroshima announced to build commemorative plaques at nine historical sites related to the bombing in the year. Genbaku Dome, Shima Hospital (hypocenter), Motoyasu Bridge all unveiled plaques with historical photographs and descriptions. The rest sites planned including Hondō Shopping Street, Motomachi No.2 Army Hospital site, Hiroshima Red Cross Hospital, Fukuromachi Elementary School, Hiroshima City Hall and Hiroshima Station. The committee also planned to establish 30 commemorative plaques in three years.

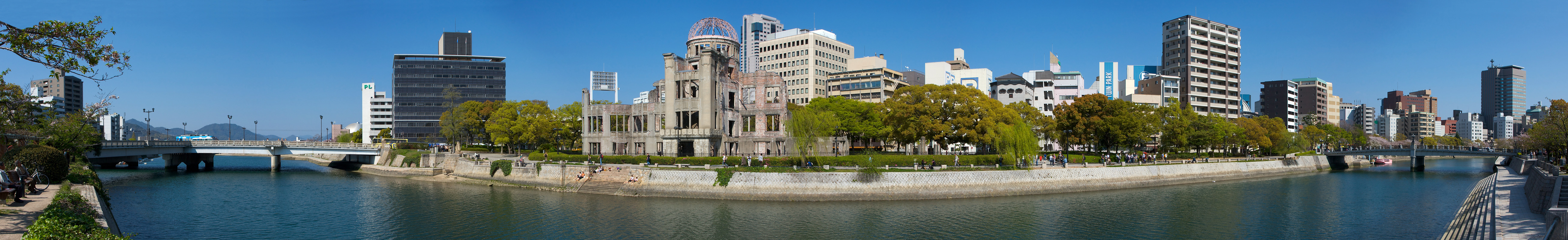
A panoramic view of Hiroshima Peace Memorial Park. The Genbaku Dome can be seen in the center left of the image, the Motoyasu Bridge can be seen in the right of the image. The original target for the bomb was the T-shaped Aioi Bridge seen in the left of the image.

=== Nagasaki ===
Nagasaki was rebuilt and dramatically changed form after the war. The pace of reconstruction was initially slow, and the first simple emergency dwellings were not provided until 1946. The focus on redevelopment was the replacement of war industries with foreign trade, shipbuilding and fishing. This was formally declared when the Nagasaki International Culture City Reconstruction Law was passed in May 1949. New temples were built, as well as new churches owing to an increase in the presence of Christianity. The Nagasaki Atomic Bomb Museum opened in the mid-1990s.

Some of the rubble was left as a memorial, such as a torii at Sannō Shrine, and an arch near ground zero. In 2013, four locations were designated Registered Monuments to provide legal protection against future development. These four sites, together with "ground zero" (the hypocenter of the atomic bomb explosion) were collectively designated a National Historic Site in 2016. These sites include:

- former Nagasaki City Shiroyama Elementary School (旧城山国民学校校舎). There were no children in the school building at the time as the building was being used for the payroll department of the Mitsubishi Arms Factory, but 138 of the 158 people inside, mostly civilian payroll staff, died.
- former Urakami Cathedral Belfry (浦上天主堂旧鐘楼). The cathedral was located close to the hypocenter and completely destroyed. At the time, it was crowded with worshippers for confession as the Feast of the Assumption of the Blessed Virgin Mary was approaching on 15 August. All were killed.
- former Nagasaki Medical University gate (旧長崎医科大学門柱). The school building and facilities were destroyed by the atomic bomb. Over 850 people, including faculty, staff, students, and nurses, were killed.
- Sannō shrine second torii gate (山王神社二の鳥居).
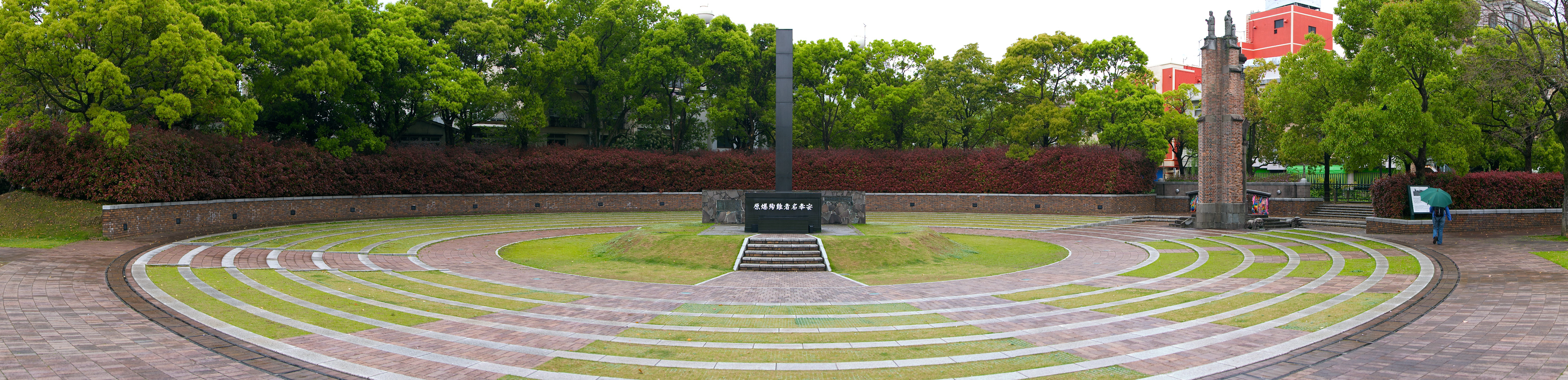
A panoramic view of the monument marking the hypocenter, or ground zero, of the atomic bomb explosion over Nagasaki

== Debate over bombings ==
The role of the atomic bombings in Japan's surrender, and the ethical, legal, and military controversies surrounding the United States' justification for them have been the subject of scholarly and popular debate. On one hand, it has been argued that the bombings caused the Japanese surrender, thereby preventing casualties that an invasion of Japan would have involved. By 1947, this was Stimson's justification spoken on behalf of "all of those who had a share in [both bombings]", (Note: In the article published in Harper's Magazine, Stimson acknowledged their evolution from a more open-ended 1945 wartime assessment: "We had developed a weapon of such a revolutionary character that its use against the enemy might [emphasis added] well be expected to produce exactly the kind of shock on the Japanese ruling oligarchy which we desired, strengthening the position of those who wished peace, and weakening that of the military party.") with an estimated figure of one million casualties saved. The naval blockade might have starved the Japanese into submission without an invasion, but this would also have resulted in many more Japanese deaths.

However, critics of the bombings have asserted that atomic weapons are fundamentally immoral, that the bombings were war crimes, and that they constituted state terrorism. The Japanese may have surrendered without the bombings, but only an unconditional surrender would satisfy the Allies. Others, such as historian Tsuyoshi Hasegawa, argued that the entry of the Soviet Union into the war against Japan "played a much greater role than the atomic bombs in inducing Japan to surrender because it dashed any hope that Japan could terminate the war through Moscow's mediation". A view among critics of the bombings, popularized by American historian Gar Alperovitz in 1965, is that the United States used nuclear weapons to intimidate the Soviet Union in the early stages of the Cold War. James Orr wrote that this idea became the accepted position in Japan and that it may have played some part in the decision-making of the U.S. government.

== Legal considerations ==
The Hague Conventions of 1899 and 1907, which address the codes of wartime conduct on land and at sea, were adopted before the rise of air power. Despite repeated diplomatic attempts to update international humanitarian law to include aerial warfare, it was not updated before World War II. The absence of specific international humanitarian law did not mean aerial warfare was not covered under the laws of war, but rather that there was no general agreement of how to interpret those laws. This means that aerial bombardment of civilian areas in enemy territory by all major belligerents during World War II was not prohibited by positive or specific customary international humanitarian law.

In 1963 the bombings were subjected to judicial review in Ryuichi Shimoda v. The State. The District Court of Tokyo ruled the use of nuclear weapons in warfare was not illegal, but held in its obiter dictum that the atomic bombings of both Hiroshima and Nagasaki were illegal under international law of that time, as an indiscriminate bombardment of undefended cities. The court denied the appellants compensation on the grounds that the Japanese government had waived the right for reparations from the U.S. government under the Treaty of San Francisco.

== Legacy ==
By 30 June 1946, there were components for nine atomic bombs in the U.S. arsenal, all Fat Man devices identical to the one used at Nagasaki. The nuclear weapons were handmade devices, and a great deal of work remained to improve their ease of assembly, safety, reliability and storage before they were ready for production. There were also many improvements to their performance that had been suggested or recommended, but that had not been possible under the pressure of wartime development. The Chairman of the Joint Chiefs of Staff, Fleet Admiral William D. Leahy, decried the use of the atomic bombs as adopting "an ethical standard common to the barbarians of the Dark Ages", but in October 1947 he reported a military requirement for 400 bombs.

The American monopoly on nuclear weapons lasted four years before the Soviet Union detonated an atomic bomb in September 1949. (Note: The UK, which had contributed to the Allied development of atomic weapons but was frozen out at the end of the war, exploded an atomic device in 1952 and a thermonuclear weapon in 1957.) The United States responded with the development of the hydrogen bomb, a thousand times as powerful as the bombs that devastated Hiroshima and Nagasaki. Such ordinary fission bombs would henceforth be regarded as small tactical nuclear weapons. By 1986, the United States had 23,317 nuclear weapons and the Soviet Union had 40,159. In early 2019, more than 90% of the world's 13,865 nuclear weapons were owned by the United States and Russia.

By 2020, nine nations had nuclear weapons. Japan, not one of them, reluctantly signed the Treaty on the Non-Proliferation of Nuclear Weapons in February 1970, but remained protected by the United States in the arrangement known as the nuclear umbrella. American nuclear weapons were stored on Okinawa, and sometimes in Japan itself, albeit in contravention of agreements between the two nations. Lacking the resources to fight the Soviet Union using conventional forces, NATO came to depend on the use of nuclear weapons to defend itself during the Cold War, a policy that became known in the 1950s as the New Look. In the decades after Hiroshima and Nagasaki, the United States threatened many times to use its nuclear weapons.

On 7 July 2017, more than 120 countries voted to adopt the UN Treaty on the Prohibition of Nuclear Weapons. Elayne Whyte Gómez, president of the UN negotiations, said, "the world has been waiting for this legal norm for 70 years". As of 2024, Japan has not signed the treaty.

== See also ==
- Hiroshima Maidens – Group of Japanese women disfigured by the atomic bombing of Hiroshima
- Setsuko Thurlow – Survivor, Nobel Peace Prize 2017
- International Friendship Bell – monument in Oak Ridge, Tennessee, dedicated to reconciliation between the United States and Japan after the bombings.
