= Enola Gay =

Airplane that dropped the first atomic bomb

Coordinates: 38.9108°N 77.4442°W

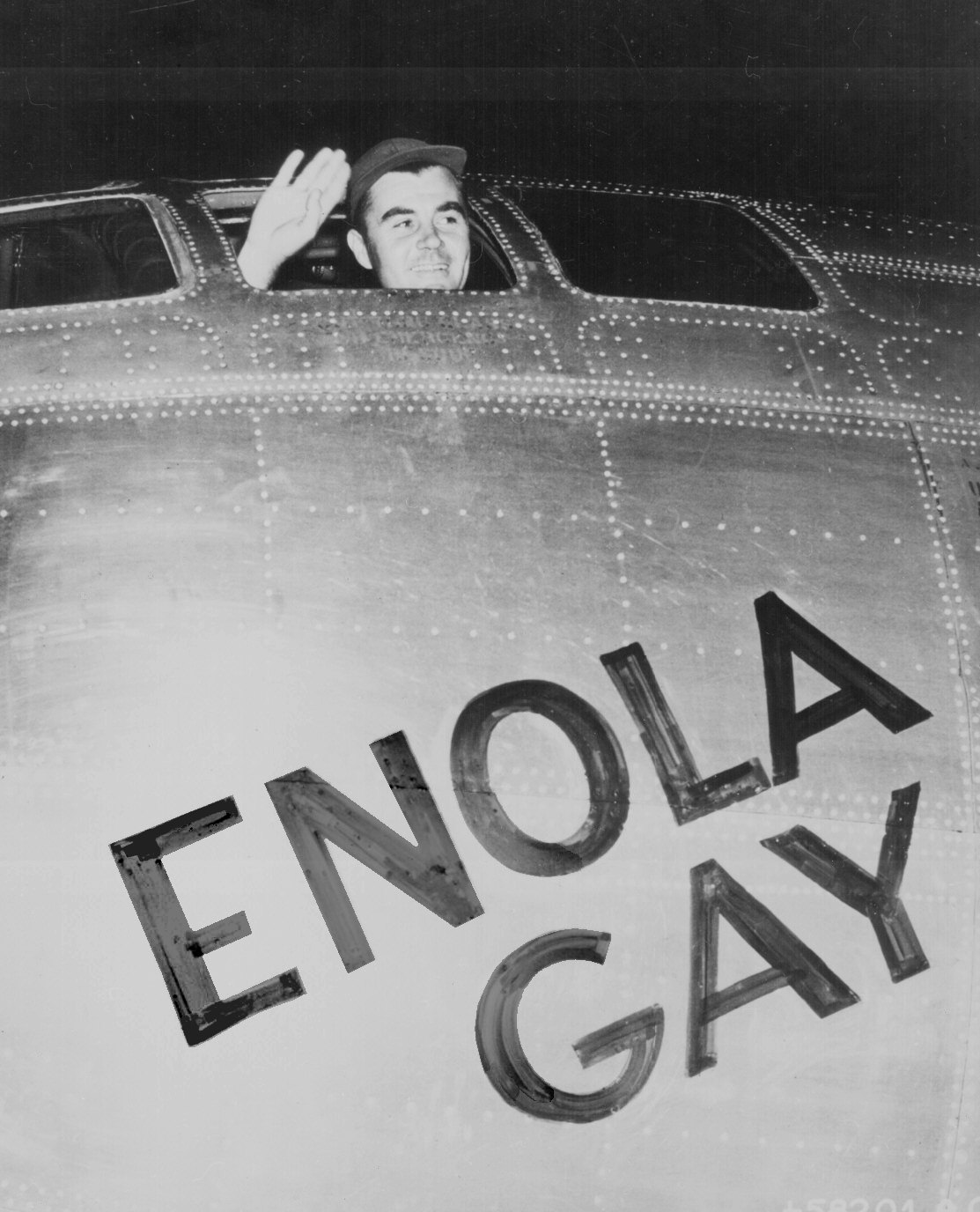
- Paul Tibbets waving from Enola Gay's cockpit before taking off for the bombing of Hiroshima in 1945

General information
- Type: B-29-45-MO Superfortress
- Manufacturer: Glenn L. Martin Company, Omaha, Nebraska
- Owners: United States Army Air Forces
- Serial: 44-86292
- Radio code: Victor 12 (later changed to Victor 82)

History
- Manufactured: 18 May 1945; 81 years ago
- In service: 18 May 1945 – 24 July 1946
- Preserved at: National Air and Space Museum's Steven F. Udvar-Hazy Center

The Enola Gay (/əˈnoʊlə/) is a Boeing B-29 Superfortress bomber, named after Enola Gay Tibbets, the mother of the pilot, Colonel Paul Tibbets. On 6 August 1945, during the final stages of World War II, it became the first aircraft to drop an atomic bomb in warfare. The bomb, code-named "Little Boy", was targeted at the city of Hiroshima, Japan, and destroyed about three-quarters of the city. Enola Gay participated in the second nuclear attack as the weather reconnaissance aircraft for the primary target of Kokura. Clouds and drifting smoke resulted in Nagasaki, a secondary target, being bombed instead (by Bockscar).

After the war, the Enola Gay returned to the United States, where it was operated from Roswell Army Air Field, New Mexico. In May 1946, it was flown to Kwajalein for the Operation Crossroads nuclear tests in the Pacific, but was not chosen to make the test drop at Bikini Atoll. Later that year, it was transferred to the Smithsonian Institution and spent many years parked at air bases exposed to the weather and souvenir hunters, before its 1961 disassembly and storage at a Smithsonian facility in Suitland, Maryland.

In the 1980s, veterans groups engaged in a call for the Smithsonian to put the aircraft on display, leading to an acrimonious debate about exhibiting the aircraft without a proper historical context. The cockpit and nose section of the aircraft were exhibited at the National Air and Space Museum (NASM) on the National Mall, for the bombing's 50th anniversary in 1995, amid controversy. Since 2003, the entire restored B-29 has been on display at NASM's Steven F. Udvar-Hazy Center. The last survivor of its crew, Theodore Van Kirk, died on 28 July 2014 at the age of 93.

== World War II ==
=== Early history ===
The Enola Gay (Model number B-29-45-MO, (Note: The block number was a one- to three-digit number, followed by a two-letter code that represented the aircraft built to the same engineering specification. The two-letter code represented the plant at which the aircraft was built, in this case, Martin in Omaha. This was combined with the aircraft model designation (B-29) to form the model number) Serial number 44-86292, Victor number 82) was built by the Glenn L. Martin Company (later part of Lockheed Martin) at its bomber plant in Bellevue, Nebraska, located at Offutt Field, now Offutt Air Force Base. The bomber was one of the first fifteen B-29s built to the "Silverplate" specification— of 65 eventually completed during and after World War II—giving them the primary ability to function as nuclear "weapon delivery" aircraft. These modifications included an extensively modified bomb bay with pneumatic doors and British bomb attachment and release systems, reversible pitch propellers that gave more braking power on landing, improved engines with fuel injection and better cooling, and the removal of protective armor and gun turrets.

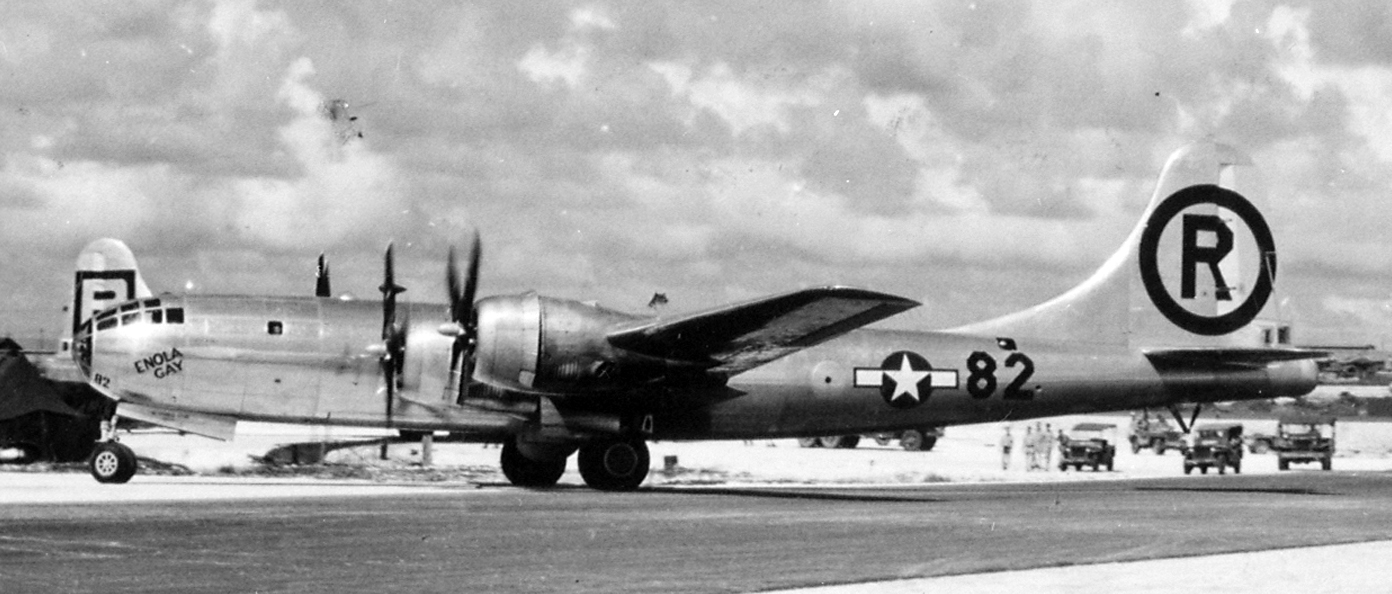
Enola Gay after the Hiroshima mission, entering hardstand. It is in its 6th Bombardment Group livery, with victor number 82 visible on fuselage just forward of the tail fin.

Enola Gay was personally selected by Colonel Paul W. Tibbets Jr., the commander of the 509th Composite Group, on 9 May 1945, while still on the assembly line. The aircraft was accepted by the United States Army Air Forces (USAAF) on 18 May 1945 and assigned to the 393d Bombardment Squadron, Heavy, 509th Composite Group. Crew B-9, commanded by Captain Robert A. Lewis, took delivery of the bomber and flew it from Omaha to the 509th base at Wendover Army Air Field, Utah, on 14 June 1945.

Thirteen days later, the aircraft left Wendover for Guam, where it received a bomb-bay modification, and flew to North Field, Tinian, on 6 July. It was initially given the Victor (squadron-assigned identification) number 12, but on 1 August, was given the circle R tail markings of the 6th Bombardment Group as a security measure and had its Victor number changed to 82 to avoid misidentification with actual 6th Bombardment Group aircraft. During July, the bomber made eight practice or training flights and flew two missions, on 24 and 26 July, to drop pumpkin bombs on industrial targets at Kobe and Nagoya. Enola Gay was used on 31 July on a rehearsal flight for the actual mission.

The partially assembled Little Boy gun-type fission weapon L-11, weighing 10,000 pounds (4,500 kg), was contained inside a 41-by-47-by-138-inch (100 cm × 120 cm × 350 cm) wooden crate that was secured to the deck of the USS Indianapolis. Unlike the six uranium-235 target discs, which were later flown to Tinian on three separate aircraft arriving 28 and 29 July, the assembled projectile with the nine uranium-235 rings installed was shipped in a single lead-lined steel container weighing 300 pounds (140 kg) that was locked to brackets welded to the deck of Captain Charles B. McVay III's quarters. (Note: The atomic bombs were euphemistically known as the "gadgets", a tag given to them by scientists at the Los Alamos test facility.) Both the L-11 and projectile were delivered to Tinian on 26 July 1945.

=== Hiroshima mission ===
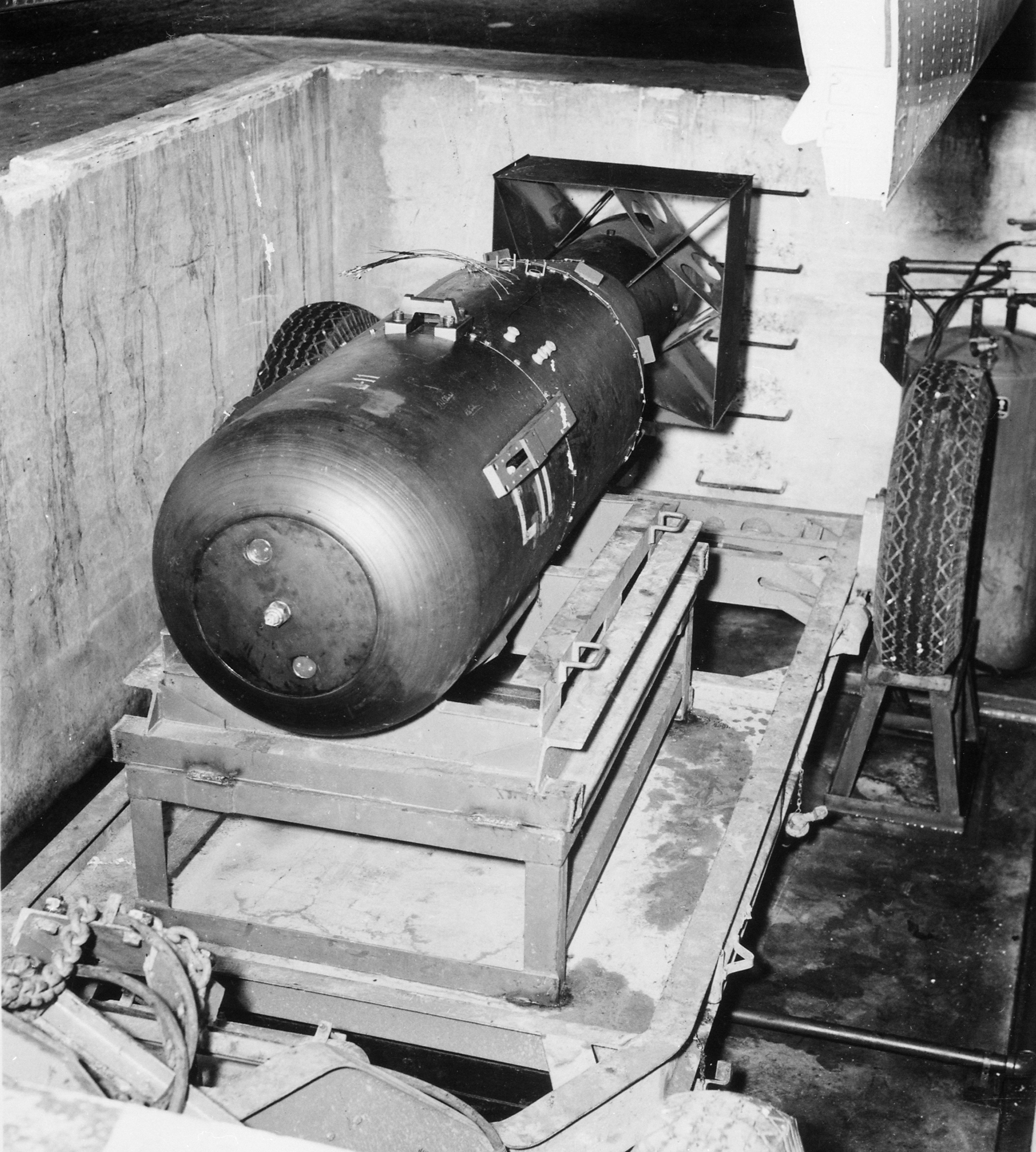
Little Boy unit on a trailer cradle in a bomb pit on Tinian, before loading into Enola Gay's bomb bay

On 5 August 1945, during preparation for the first atomic mission, Tibbets assumed command of the aircraft and named it after his mother, Enola Gay Tibbets, who, in turn, had been named for the heroine of a novel. (Note: Enola; or Her Fatal Mistake (1886), by Mary Young Ridenbaugh is the only novel of the period to use "Enola".) When it came to selecting a name for the plane, Tibbets later recalled that:

... my thoughts turned at this point to my courageous red-haired mother, whose quiet confidence had been a source of strength to me since boyhood, and particularly during the soul-searching period when I decided to give up a medical career to become a military pilot. At a time when Dad had thought I had lost my marbles, she had taken my side and said, "I know you will be all right, son."

In the early morning hours, just prior to the 6 August mission, Tibbets had a young Army Air Forces maintenance man, Private Nelson Miller, paint the name just under the pilot's window. Regularly assigned aircraft commander Robert A. Lewis was unhappy to be displaced by Tibbets for this important mission and became furious when he arrived at the aircraft on the morning of 6 August to see it painted with the now-famous nose art.

Hiroshima was the primary target of the first nuclear bombing mission on 6 August, with Kokura and Nagasaki as alternative targets. Enola Gay, piloted by Tibbets, took off from North Field, in the Northern Mariana Islands, about six hours' flight time from Japan, accompanied by two other B-29s, The Great Artiste, carrying instrumentation, and a then-nameless aircraft later called Necessary Evil, commanded by Captain George Marquardt, to take photographs. The director of the Manhattan Project, Major General Leslie R. Groves Jr., wanted the event recorded for posterity, so the takeoff was illuminated by floodlights. When he wanted to taxi, Tibbets leaned out the window to direct the bystanders out of the way. On request, he gave a friendly wave for the cameras.

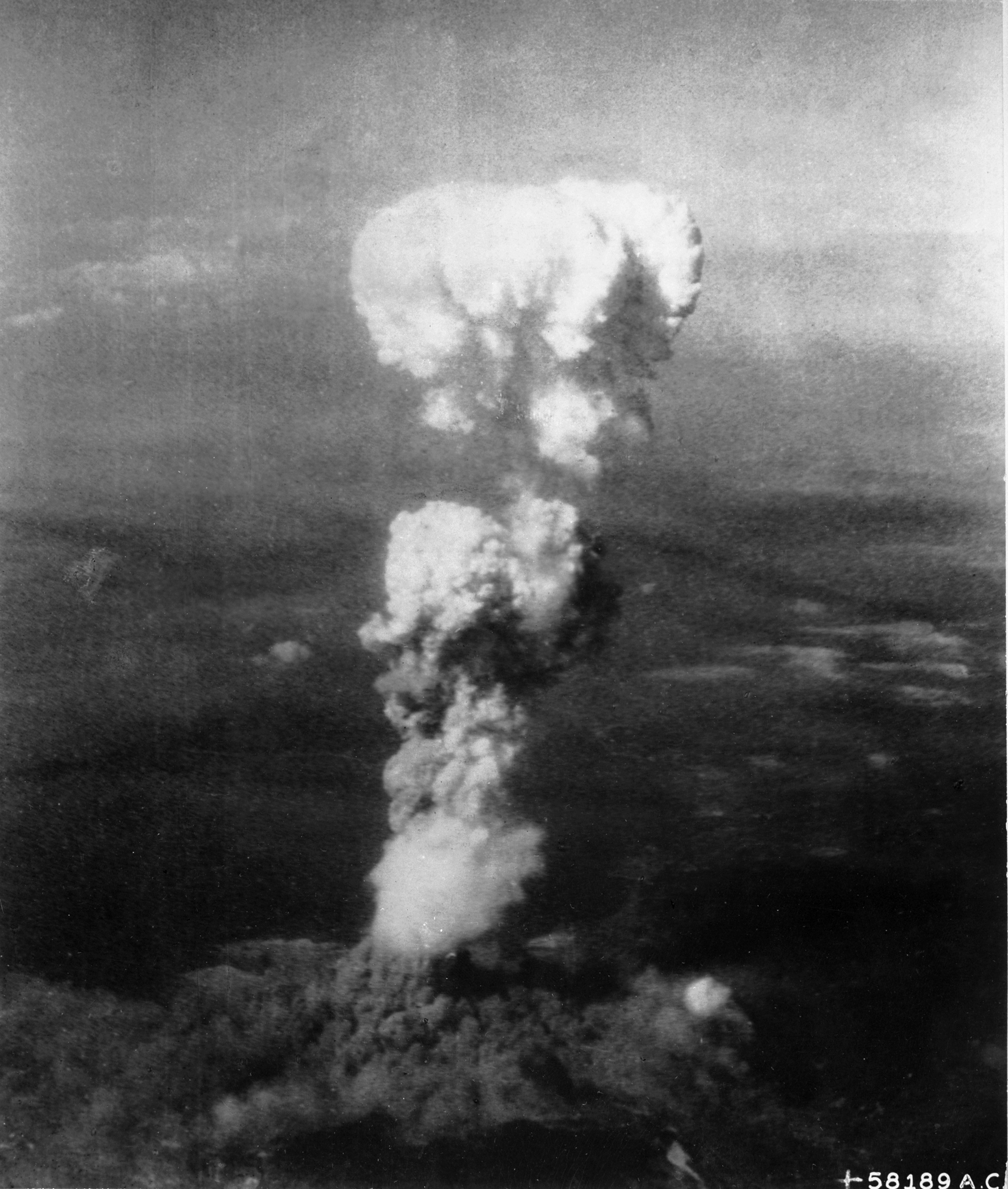
Hiroshima explosion

After leaving Tinian, the three aircraft made their way separately to Iwo Jima, where they rendezvoused at 2,440 meters (8,010 ft) and set course for Japan. The aircraft arrived over the target in clear visibility at 9,855 meters (32,333 ft). Navy Captain William S. "Deak" Parsons of Project Alberta, who was in command of the mission, armed the bomb during the flight to minimize the risks during takeoff. His assistant, Second Lieutenant Morris R. Jeppson, removed the safety devices 30 minutes before reaching the target area.

The release at 08:15 (Hiroshima time) went as planned, and the Little Boy took 53 seconds to fall from the aircraft flying at 31,060 feet (9,470 m) to the predetermined detonation height about 1,968 feet (600 m) above the city. Enola Gay traveled 11.5 mi (18.5 km) before it felt the shock waves from the blast. Although buffeted by the shock, neither Enola Gay nor The Great Artiste was damaged.

The detonation created a blast equivalent to 15 kilotons of TNT (63 TJ). The U-235 weapon was considered very inefficient, with only 1.7% of its fissile material reacting. The radius of total destruction was about one mile (1.6 km), with resulting fires across 4.4 square miles (11 km^{2}). Americans estimated that 4.7 square miles (12 km^{2}) of the city were destroyed. Japanese officials determined that 69% of Hiroshima's buildings were destroyed and another 6–7% damaged. Some 70,000–80,000 people, 30% of the city's population, were killed by the blast and resultant firestorm, and another 70,000 injured. Out of those killed, 20,000 were soldiers and 20,000 were Korean slave laborers.

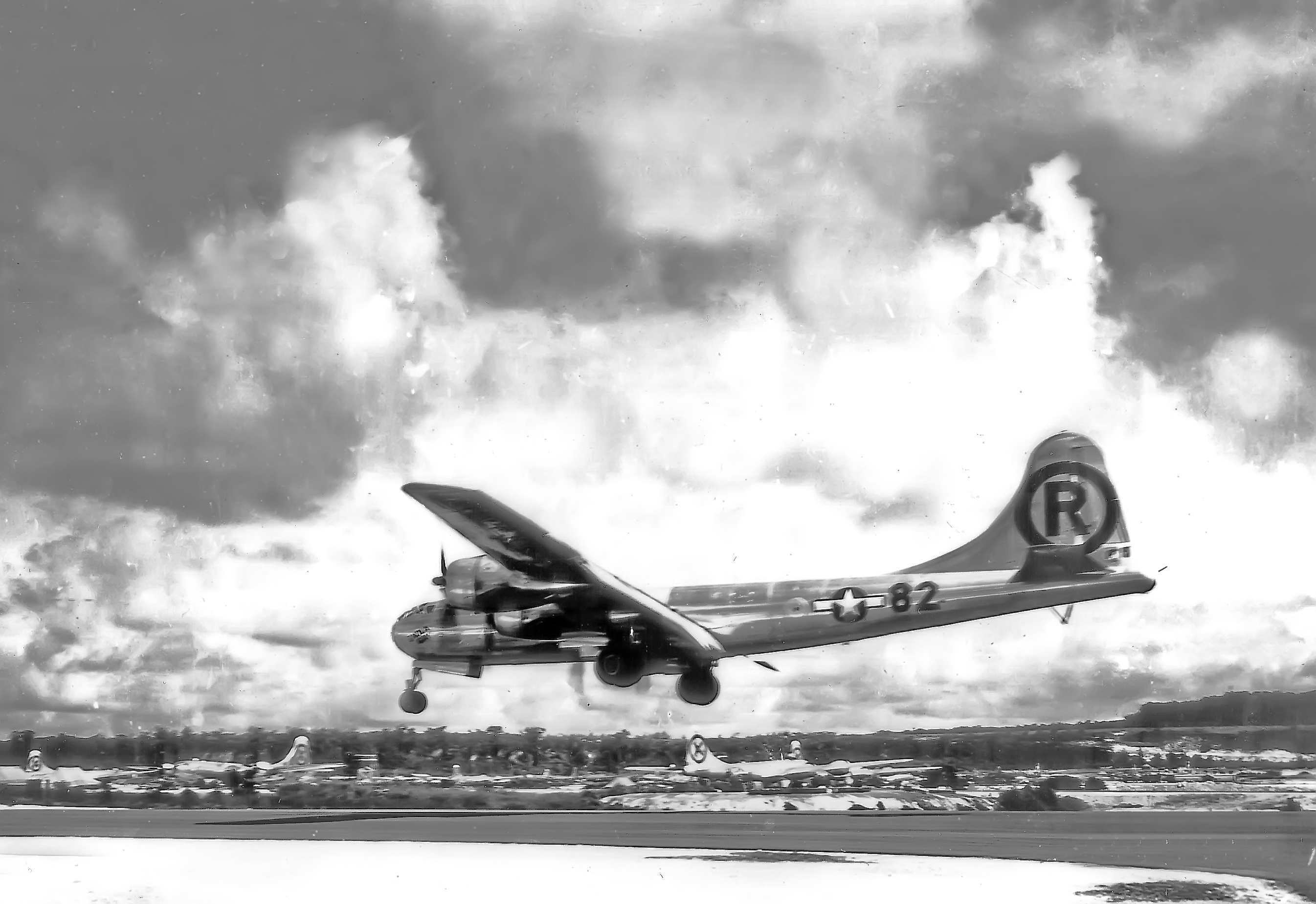
Enola Gay landing at its base

Enola Gay returned safely to its base on Tinian to great fanfare, touching down at 2:58 pm, after 12 hours 13 minutes. The Great Artiste and Necessary Evil followed at short intervals. Several hundred people, including journalists and photographers, had gathered to watch the planes return. Tibbets was the first to disembark and was presented with the Distinguished Service Cross on the spot.

=== Nagasaki mission ===
The Hiroshima mission was followed by another atomic strike. Originally scheduled for 11 August, it was brought forward by two days to 9 August owing to a forecast of bad weather. This time, a nuclear bomb code-named "Fat Man" was carried by B-29 Bockscar, piloted by Major Charles W. Sweeney. Enola Gay, flown by Captain George Marquardt's Crew B-10, was the weather reconnaissance aircraft for Kokura, the primary target. Enola Gay reported clear skies over Kokura, but by the time Bockscar arrived, the city was obscured by smoke from fires from the conventional bombing of Yahata by 224 B-29s the day before. After three unsuccessful passes, Bockscar diverted to its secondary target, Nagasaki, where it dropped its bomb. In contrast to the Hiroshima mission, the Nagasaki mission has been described as tactically botched, although the mission did meet its objectives. The crew encountered a number of problems in execution and had very little fuel by the time they landed at the emergency backup landing site Yontan Airfield on Okinawa.

== Crews ==
The mission runs of 6 and 9 August, with Hiroshima, Nagasaki, and Kokura (the original target for 9 August) displayed

=== Hiroshima mission ===
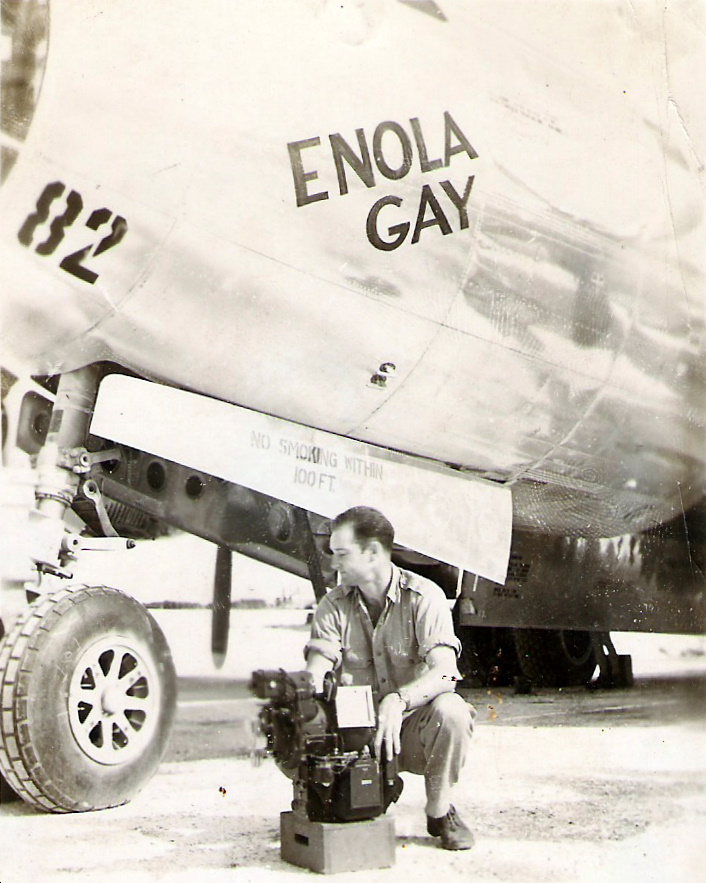
Bombardier Thomas Ferebee with the Norden Bombsight on Tinian after the dropping of the Little Boy

Enola Gay's crew on 6 August 1945 consisted of 12 men. The crew was:

- Colonel Paul W. Tibbets Jr. – pilot and aircraft commander (1915–2007)
- Captain Robert A. Lewis – co-pilot; Enola Gay's regularly assigned aircraft commander* (1917–1983)
- Major Thomas Ferebee – bombardier (1918–2000)
- Captain Theodore "Dutch" Van Kirk – navigator (1921–2014)
- Captain William S. "Deak" Parsons, USN – weaponeer and mission commander (1901–1953)
- First Lieutenant Jacob Beser – radar countermeasures (also the only man to fly on both of the nuclear bombing aircraft) (1921–1992)
- Second Lieutenant Morris R. Jeppson – assistant weaponeer (1922–2010)
- Staff Sergeant Robert "Bob" Caron – tail gunner* (1919–1995)
- Staff Sergeant Wyatt E. Duzenbury – flight engineer* (1913-1992)
- Sergeant Joe S. Stiborik – radar operator* (1914-1984)
- Sergeant Robert H. Shumard – assistant flight engineer* (1920-1967)
- Private First Class Richard H. Nelson – VHF radio operator* (1925-2003)

Asterisks denote regular crewmen of the Enola Gay.

Of mission commander Parsons, it was said: "There is no one more responsible for getting this bomb out of the laboratory and into some form useful for combat operations than Captain Parsons, by his plain genius in the ordnance business."

=== Nagasaki mission ===
For the Nagasaki mission, Enola Gay was flown by Crew B-10, normally assigned to Up An' Atom:

- Captain George W. Marquardt – aircraft commander
- Second Lieutenant James M. Anderson – co-pilot
- Second Lieutenant Russell Gackenbach – navigator
- Captain James W. Strudwick – bombardier
- Technical Sergeant James R. Corliss – flight engineer
- Sergeant Warren L. Coble – radio operator
- Sergeant Joseph M. DiJulio – radar operator
- Sergeant Melvin H. Bierman – tail gunner
- Sergeant Anthony D. Capua Jr. – assistant engineer/scanner

Source: Campbell, 2005, pp. 134, 191–192.

== Subsequent history ==
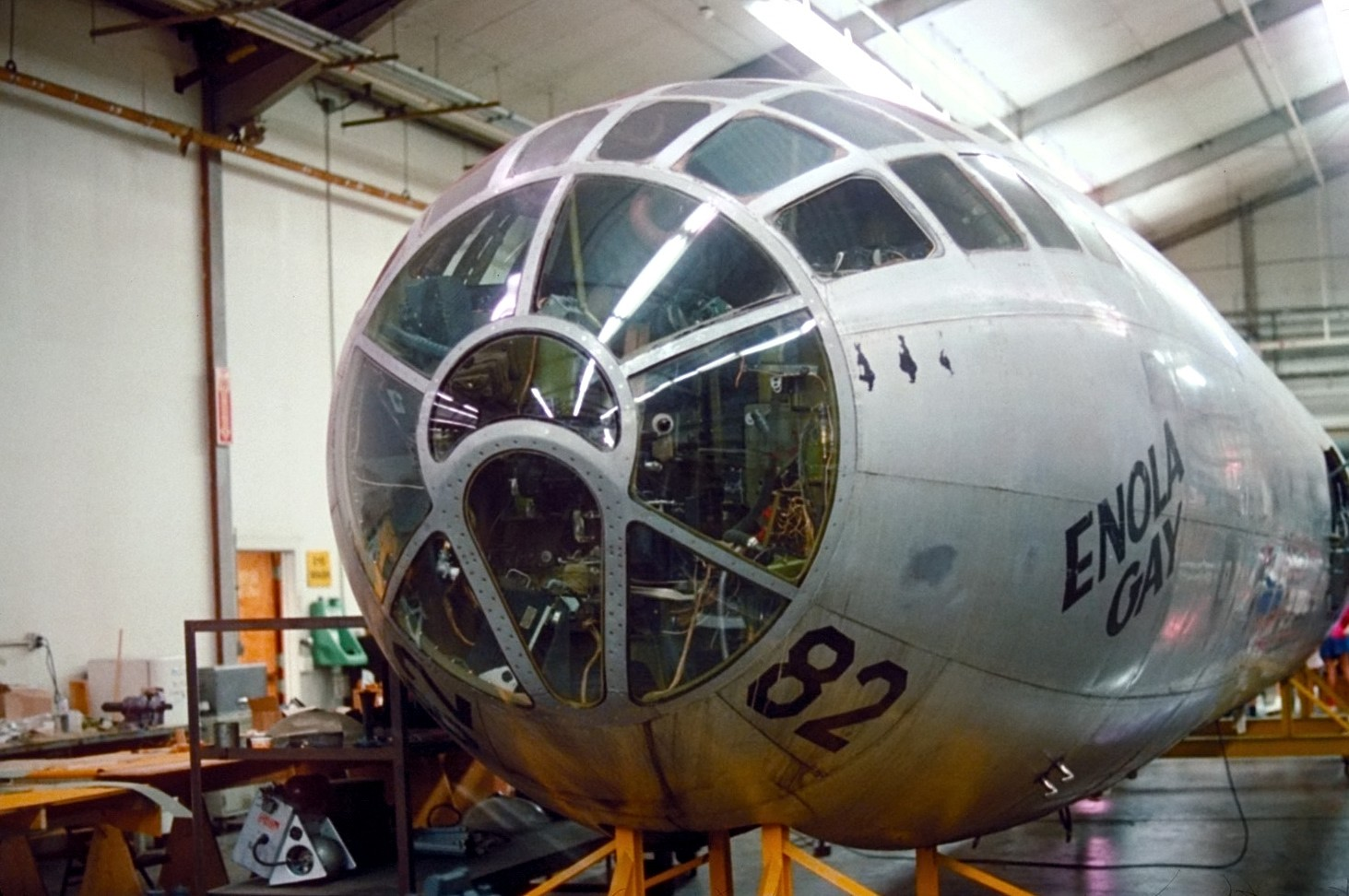
Cockpit section of Enola Gay in the Smithsonian storage facility at Suitland, 1987

On 6 November 1945, Lewis flew the Enola Gay back to the United States, arriving at the 509th's new base at Roswell Army Air Field, New Mexico, on 8 November. On 29 April 1946, Enola Gay left Roswell as part of the Operation Crossroads nuclear weapons tests in the Pacific. It flew to Kwajalein Atoll on 1 May. It was not chosen to make the test drop at Bikini Atoll and left Kwajalein on 1 July, the date of the test, reaching Fairfield-Suisun Army Air Field, California, the next day.

The decision was made to preserve the Enola Gay, and on 24 July 1946, the aircraft was flown to Davis–Monthan Air Force Base, Tucson, Arizona, in preparation for storage. On 30 August 1946, the title to the aircraft was transferred to the Smithsonian Institution and the Enola Gay was removed from the USAAF inventory. From 1946 to 1961, the Enola Gay was put into temporary storage at a number of locations. It was at Davis-Monthan from 1 September 1946 until 3 July 1949, when it was flown to Orchard Place Air Field, Park Ridge, Illinois, by Tibbets for acceptance by the Smithsonian. It was moved to Pyote Air Force Base, Texas, on 12 January 1952, and then to Andrews Air Force Base, Maryland, on 2 December 1953, because the Smithsonian had no storage space for the aircraft.

It was hoped that the Air Force would guard the plane, but, lacking hangar space, it was left outdoors on a remote part of the air base, exposed to the elements. Souvenir hunters broke in and removed parts. Insects and birds then gained access to the aircraft. Paul E. Garber of the Smithsonian Institution became concerned about the Enola Gay's condition, and on 10 August 1960, Smithsonian staff began dismantling the aircraft. The components were transported to the Smithsonian storage facility at Suitland, Maryland, on 21 July 1961.

The Enola Gay remained at Suitland for many years. By the early 1980s, two veterans of the 509th, Don Rehl and his former navigator in the 509th, Frank B. Stewart, began lobbying for the aircraft to be restored and put on display. They enlisted Tibbets and Senator Barry Goldwater in their campaign. In 1983, Walter J. Boyne, a former B-52 pilot with the Strategic Air Command, became director of the National Air and Space Museum, and he made the Enola Gay's restoration a priority. Looking at the aircraft, Tibbets recalled, was a "sad meeting. [My] fond memories, and I don't mean the dropping of the bomb, were the numerous occasions I flew the airplane ... I pushed it very, very hard and it never failed me ... It was probably the most beautiful piece of machinery that any pilot ever flew."

== Restoration ==
Restoration of the bomber began on 5 December 1984, at the Paul E. Garber Preservation, Restoration, and Storage Facility in Suitland-Silver Hill, Maryland. The propellers that were used on the bombing mission were later shipped to Texas A&M University. One of these propellers was trimmed to 12.5 feet (3.8 m) for use in the university's Oran W. Nicks Low Speed Wind Tunnel. The lightweight aluminum variable-pitch propeller is powered by a 1,250 kVA electric motor, providing a wind speed up to 200 miles per hour (320 km/h). Two engines were rebuilt at Garber and two at San Diego Air & Space Museum. Some parts and instruments had been removed and could not be located. Replacements were found or fabricated, and marked so that future curators could distinguish them from the original components.

=== Exhibition controversy ===
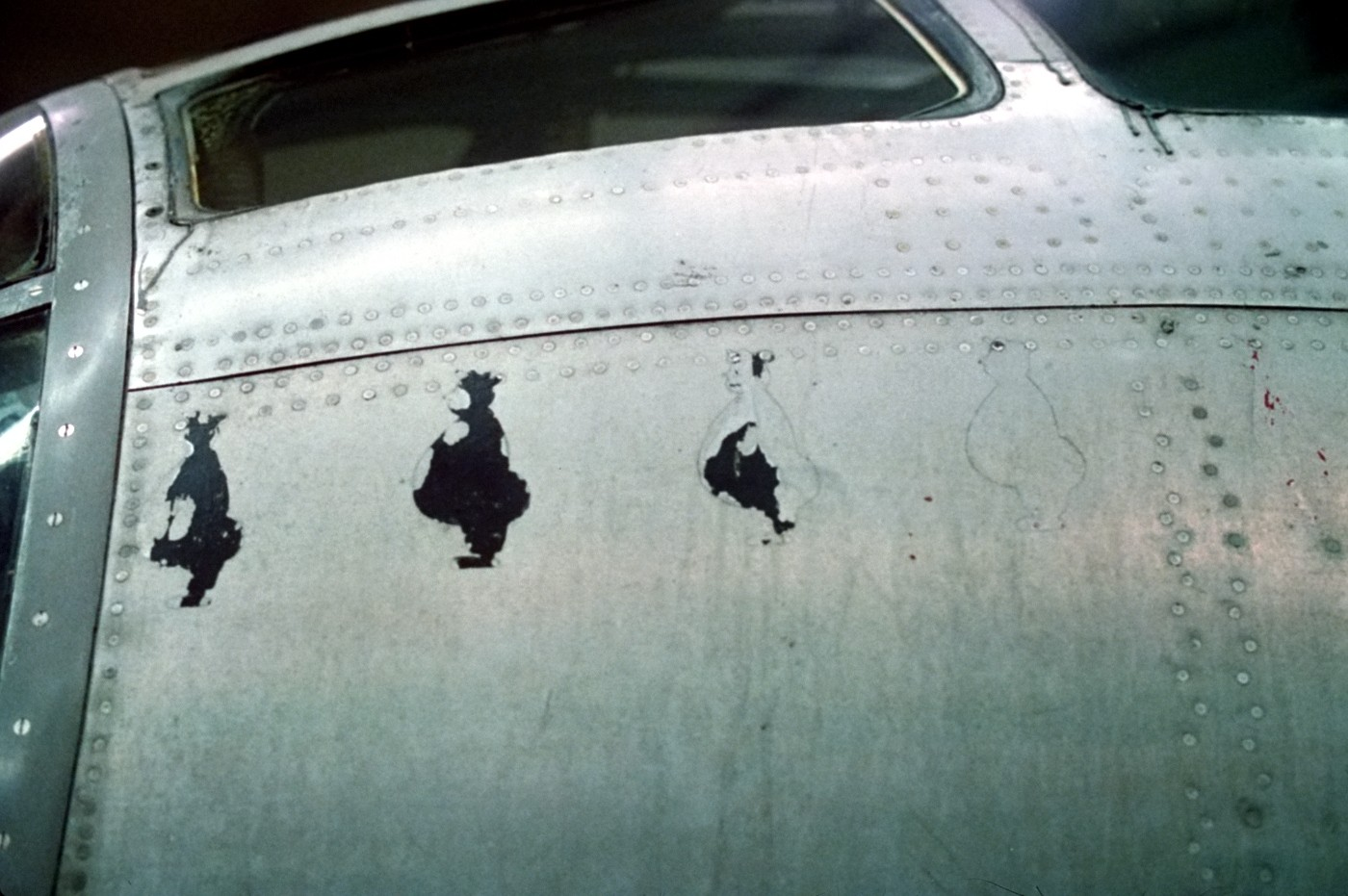
Under the cockpit window of the Enola Gay, while in storage 1987

The Enola Gay became the center of a controversy at the Smithsonian Institution when the museum planned to put its fuselage on public display in 1995 as part of an exhibit commemorating the 50th anniversary of the atomic bombing of Hiroshima. The exhibit, The Crossroads: The End of World War II, the Atomic Bomb and the Cold War, was drafted by the Smithsonian's National Air and Space Museum staff, and arranged around the restored Enola Gay.

Critics of the planned exhibit, especially those of the American Legion and the Air Force Association, charged that the exhibit focused too much attention on the Japanese casualties inflicted by the nuclear bomb, rather than on the motives for the bombing or the discussion of the bomb's role in ending the conflict with Japan. The exhibit brought to national attention many long-standing academic and political issues related to retrospective views of the bombings. After attempts to revise the exhibit to meet the satisfaction of competing interest groups, the exhibit was canceled on 30 January 1995. Martin O. Harwit, Director of the National Air and Space Museum, was compelled to resign over the controversy. The historian Barton Bernstein later wrote that,

...[t]he dispute was not simply about the atomic bomb. Rather, the dispute was sometimes a symbolic issue in a "culture war" in which many Americans lumped together the seeming decline of American power, the difficulties of the domestic economy, the threats in world trade and especially Japan's successes, the loss of domestic jobs, and even changes in American gender roles and shifts in the American family. To a number of Americans, the very people responsible for the script were the people who were changing America. The bomb, representing the end of World War II and suggesting the height of American power was to be celebrated. It was, in this judgment, a crucial symbol of America's "good war", one fought justly for noble purposes at a time when America was united. Those who in any way questioned the bomb's use were, in this emotional framework, the enemies of America.

The forward fuselage went on display on 28 June 1995. On 2 July 1995, three people were arrested for throwing ash and human blood on the aircraft's fuselage, following an earlier incident in which a protester had thrown red paint over the gallery's carpeting. The exhibition closed on 18 May 1998 and the fuselage was returned to the Garber Facility for final restoration.

=== Complete restoration and display ===
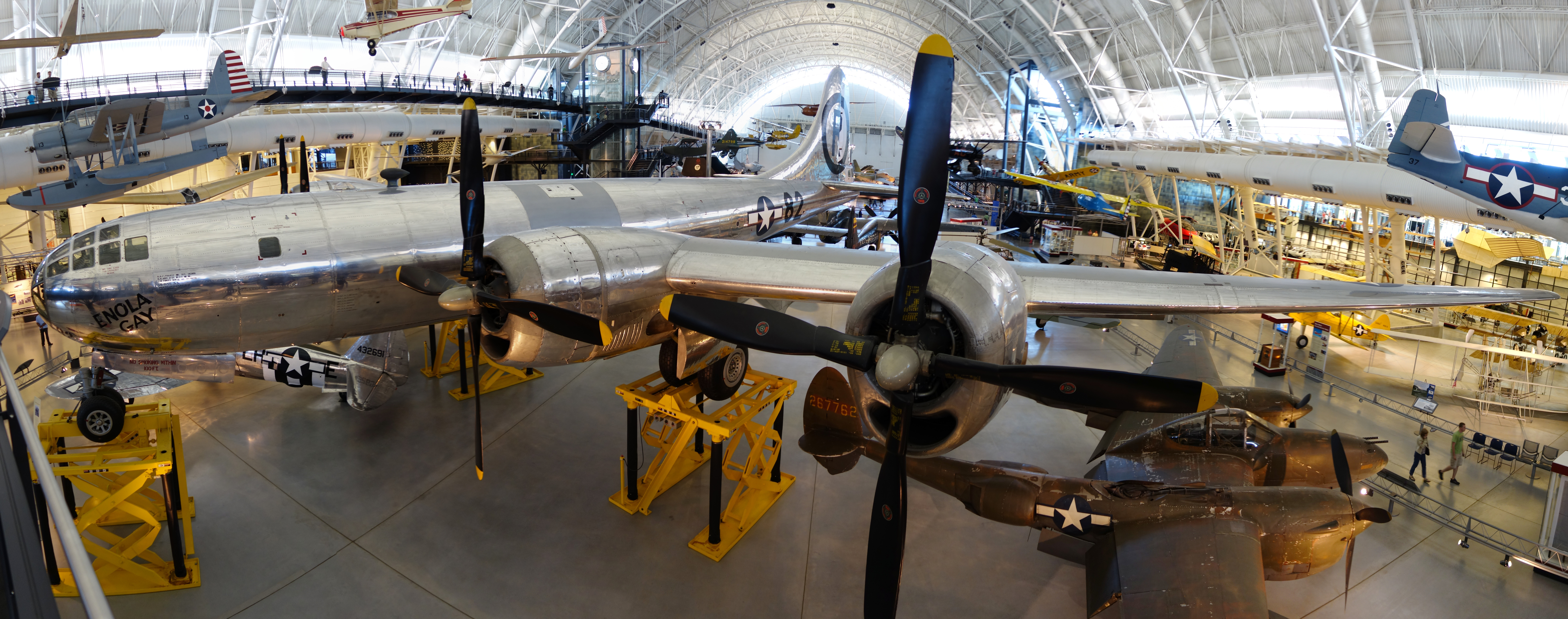
The Enola Gay on display at the National Air and Space Museum, Steven F. Udvar-Hazy Center

Its restoration work began in 1984, and eventually required 300,000 staff hours. While the fuselage was on display, from 1995 to 1998, work continued on the remaining unrestored components. The aircraft was shipped in pieces to the National Air and Space Museum's Steven F. Udvar-Hazy Center in Chantilly, Virginia from March–June 2003, with the fuselage and wings reunited for the first time since 1960 on 10 April 2003 and assembly completed on 8 August 2003. The aircraft has been on display at the Udvar-Hazy Center since the museum annex opened on 15 December 2003. As a result of the earlier controversy, the signage around the aircraft provided only the same succinct technical data as is provided for other aircraft in the museum, without discussion of the controversial issues. It read:

Boeing's B-29 Superfortress was the most sophisticated propeller-driven bomber of World War II, and the first bomber to house its crew in pressurized compartments. Although designed to fight in the European theater, the B-29 found its niche on the other side of the globe. In the Pacific, B-29s delivered a variety of aerial weapons: conventional bombs, incendiary bombs, mines, and two nuclear weapons.

On 6 August 1945, this Martin-built B-29-45-MO dropped the first atomic weapon used in combat on Hiroshima, Japan. Three days later, Bockscar (on display at the U.S. Air Force Museum near Dayton, Ohio) dropped a second atomic bomb on Nagasaki, Japan. Enola Gay flew as the advance weather reconnaissance aircraft that day. A third B-29, The Great Artiste, flew as an observation aircraft on both missions.

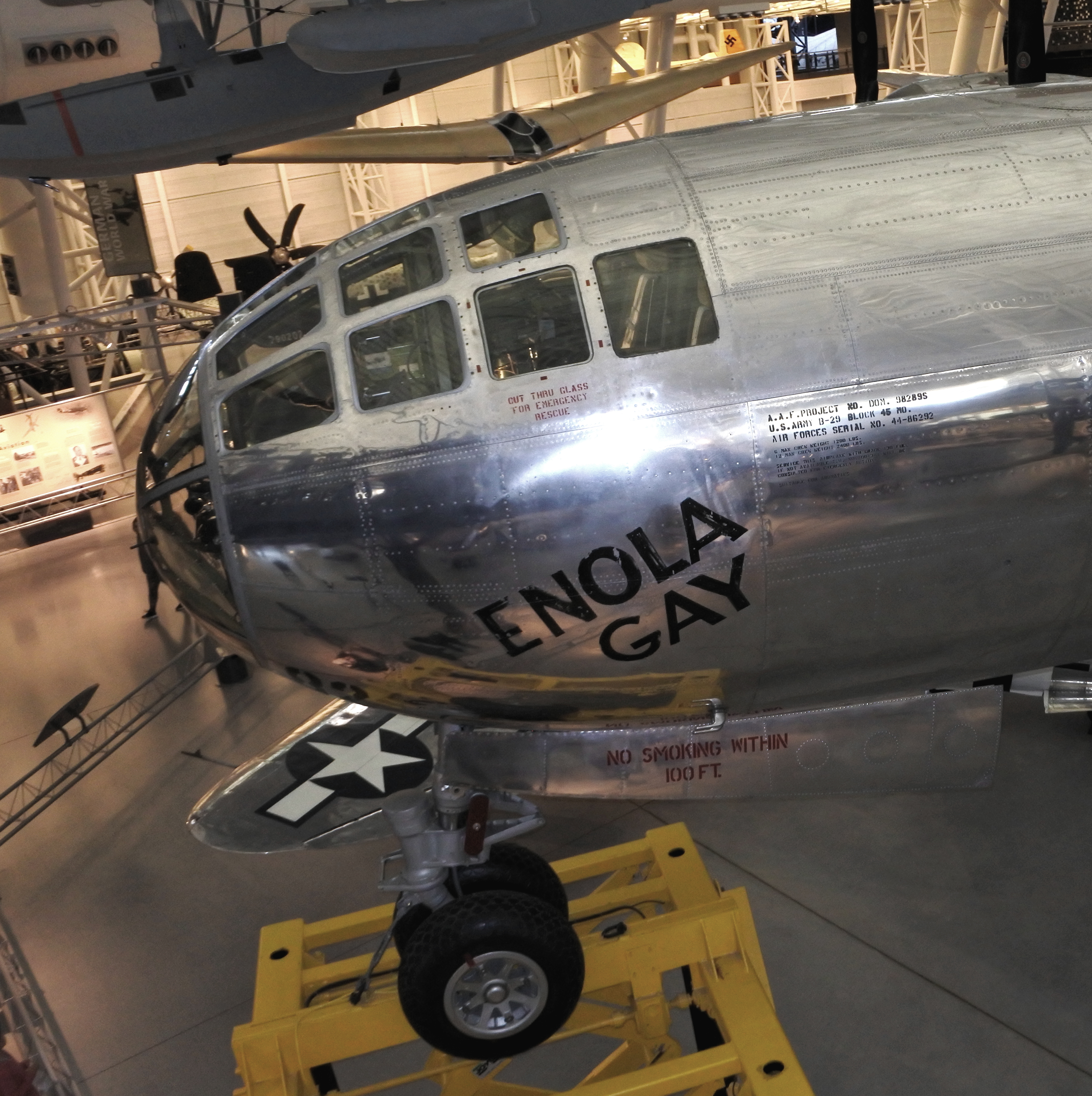
Enola Gay nose, port side, at the Steven F. Udvar-Hazy Center

Transferred from the U.S. Air Force

Wingspan: 43 metres (141 feet 1 inch)
Length:30.2 m (99 ft)
Height: 9 metres (29 feet 6 inches)
Weight, empty: 32,580 kg (71,830 lb)
Weight, gross: 63,504 kg (140,002 lb)
Top speed: 546 km/h (339 mph)
Engines: 4 Wright R-3350-57 Cyclone turbo-supercharged radials, 2,200 hp
Crew: 12 (Hiroshima mission)
Armament: two .50 caliber machine guns
Ordnance: Little Boy atomic bomb
Manufacturer: Martin Co., Omaha, Nebraska, 1945
A19500100000

The display of the Enola Gay without reference to the historical context of World War II, the Cold War, or the development and deployment of nuclear weapons aroused controversy. A petition from a group calling themselves the Committee for a National Discussion of Nuclear History and Current Policy bemoaned the display of Enola Gay as a technological achievement, which it described as an "extraordinary callousness toward the victims, indifference to the deep divisions among American citizens about the propriety of these actions, and disregard for the feelings of most of the world's peoples". It attracted signatures from notable figures including historian Gar Alperovitz, social critic Noam Chomsky, whistleblower Daniel Ellsberg, physicist Joseph Rotblat, writer Kurt Vonnegut, producer Norman Lear, actor Martin Sheen and filmmaker Oliver Stone.
