= Necessary Evil (aircraft) =

Aircraft used during the raid on Hiroshima on 6 August 1945

General information
- Type: Boeing B-29-45-MO Superfortress
- Manufacturer: Glenn L. Martin Company
- Serial: 44-86291
- Radio code: Victor 91

History
- In service: May 18, 1945 - November 1956
- Fate: Struck from the Air Force inventory in November 1956, Necessary Evil was transferred to the U.S. Navy and used as a target at the Naval Ordnance Test Station at China Lake, California.

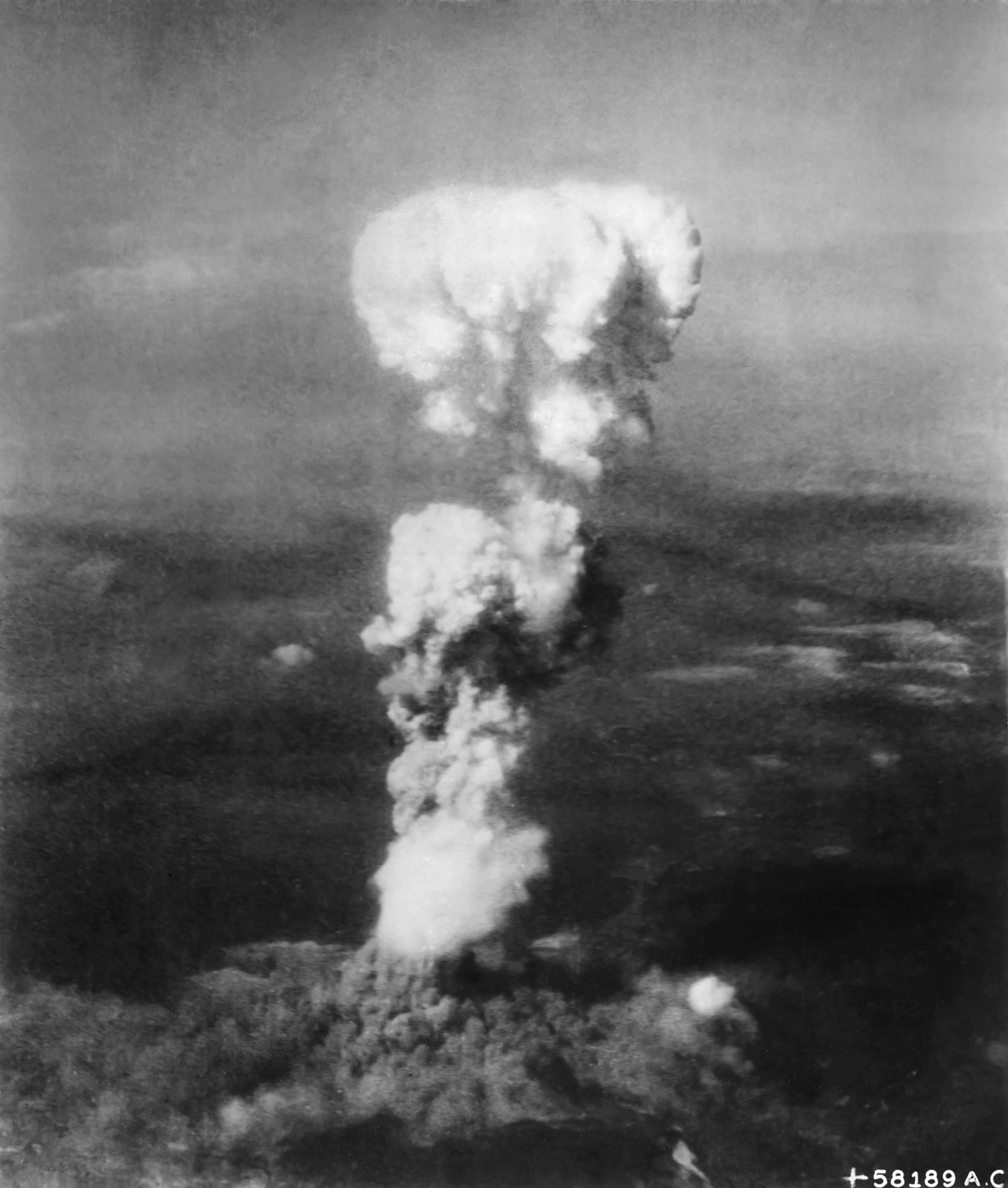
The mushroom cloud over Hiroshima after the dropping of "Little Boy" photographed by Bob Caron aboard Necessary Evil

Necessary Evil, also referred to as Plane #91, was the name of Boeing B-29-45-MO Superfortress 44-86291 (Victor 91), participating in the atomic bomb attack on Hiroshima on August 6, 1945.

Assigned to the 393d Bomb Squadron, 509th Composite Group, it was used as a camera plane to photograph the explosion and effects of the bomb, and to carry scientific observers. At the time of the attack the plane was not named and was known only by its 393d Victor number. The mission was flown by crew B-10, with Captain George Marquardt as aircraft commander.

The crew regularly assigned to this airplane in turn flew on the Nagasaki mission on August 9, 1945, in another B-29; Big Stink, though without their aircraft commander, who was ill.

== Aircraft history ==
Built at the Glenn L. Martin Aircraft Plant at Omaha, Nebraska, Necessary Evil was accepted by the Army Air Forces on May 18, 1945, and flown to Wendover Army Air Field, Utah, by its assigned crew C-14 (1st Lt. Norman W. Ray, Aircraft Commander) in June. It departed Wendover for North Field, Tinian on June 27 and arrived on July 2. It was originally assigned the Victor (unit-assigned identification) number 11 but on August 1 was given the Circle-R tail markings of the 6th Bomb Group as a security measure and had its Victor changed to 91 to avoid misidentification with actual 6th BG aircraft. It was named and had its nose art painted after the Nagasaki mission.

In addition to the Hiroshima mission, Necessary Evil's operations history on Tinian included 10 training and practice missions, and three combat missions in which it dropped pumpkin bombs on industrial targets in Kobe, Kashiwazaki, and Koriyama, all flown by 1st Lt. Ray and crew C-14.

Colonel Paul Tibbets had chosen Necessary Evil, commanded by Captain George Marquardt, to lead a third atomic bomb drop against Japan. Secretary of War Henry Stimson stated following the bombing of Nagasaki, "These two heavy blows have fallen in quick succession upon the Japanese and there will be quite a little space before we intend to drop another". Stimson notes in his diary entry August 10, 1945 "[Secretary of the Navy James Forrestal] told me that they were planning another big attack by [Pacific Third Fleet Admiral William "Bull"] Halsey and he was afraid this would go on.". Colonel Tibbets under orders by General Curtis LeMay, dispatched Lt. Col. Classen, the deputy group commander, in the unnamed victor 94 and crew B-6 in Jabit III, together with their ground crews, to Wendover AAFB to stage for the possibility of transporting further Fat Man [Model 1561] bomb assemblies to Tinian. At Los Alamos, the second plutonium core for the third bomb had been fabricated and was ready for shipment from Mare Island Naval Shipyard to Tinian by special courier Lt. William A. King on a C-54 cargo aircraft of the 509th CG. These shipments were halted on August 14, 1945 by orders from Washington.

In December 1945 Necessary Evil returned to the United States with the 509th CG to Roswell Army Airfield, New Mexico. It was part of the Operation Crossroads task force from August 1946 until June 1949, when it was transferred to the 97th Bomb Group at Biggs Air Force Base, Texas.

Necessary Evil was re-configured as a TB-29 trainer by the Oklahoma City Materiel Area at Tinker Air Force Base in April 1950. It was subsequently assigned to:

- 1st Tow Target Squadron, Biggs Air Force Base (September 1952),
- 1st Radar Calibration Squadron, Griffiss Air Force Base, New York (March 1953),
- 4713th Radar Evaluation Flight, Griffiss AFB (March 1954),
- 17th Tow Target Squadron, Yuma County Airport, Arizona (June 1955), and
- 4750th Air Defense Wing, Vincent Air Force Base, Arizona.

Necessary Evil was dropped from the Air Force inventory in November 1956. It was transferred to the U.S. Navy and used as a target at the Naval Ordnance Test Station at China Lake, California.

=== Hiroshima mission crew ===
Crew B-10 (normally assigned to Up An' Atom)

- Capt. George W. Marquardt, Aircraft Commander
- 2nd Lt. James M. Anderson, Co-Pilot
- 2nd Lt. Russell Gackenbach, Navigator
- Capt. James W. Strudwick, Bombardier
- T/Sgt. James R. Corliss, Flight Engineer
- Sgt. Warren L. Coble, Radio Operator
- Sgt. Joseph M. DiJulio, Radar Operator
- Sgt. Melvin H. Bierman, Tail Gunner
- Sgt. Anthony D. Capua Jr., Assistant Engineer/Scanner
- (Civilian) Prof. Bernard Waldman, Project Alberta, camera operator

== Other aircraft named Necessary Evil ==
Two FB-111A strategic bombers of the USAF 509th Bomb Wing, serials 67-7194 and 68–0259, carried the name and original nose art of Necessary Evil on their nosewheel doors while based at Pease Air Force Base, New Hampshire, in the 1970s and 1980s.
