= Strange Cargo (aircraft) =

Strange Cargo was the name of a Boeing B-29 Superfortress (B-29-36-MO 44-27300, Victor number 73) modified to carry the atomic bomb in World War II.

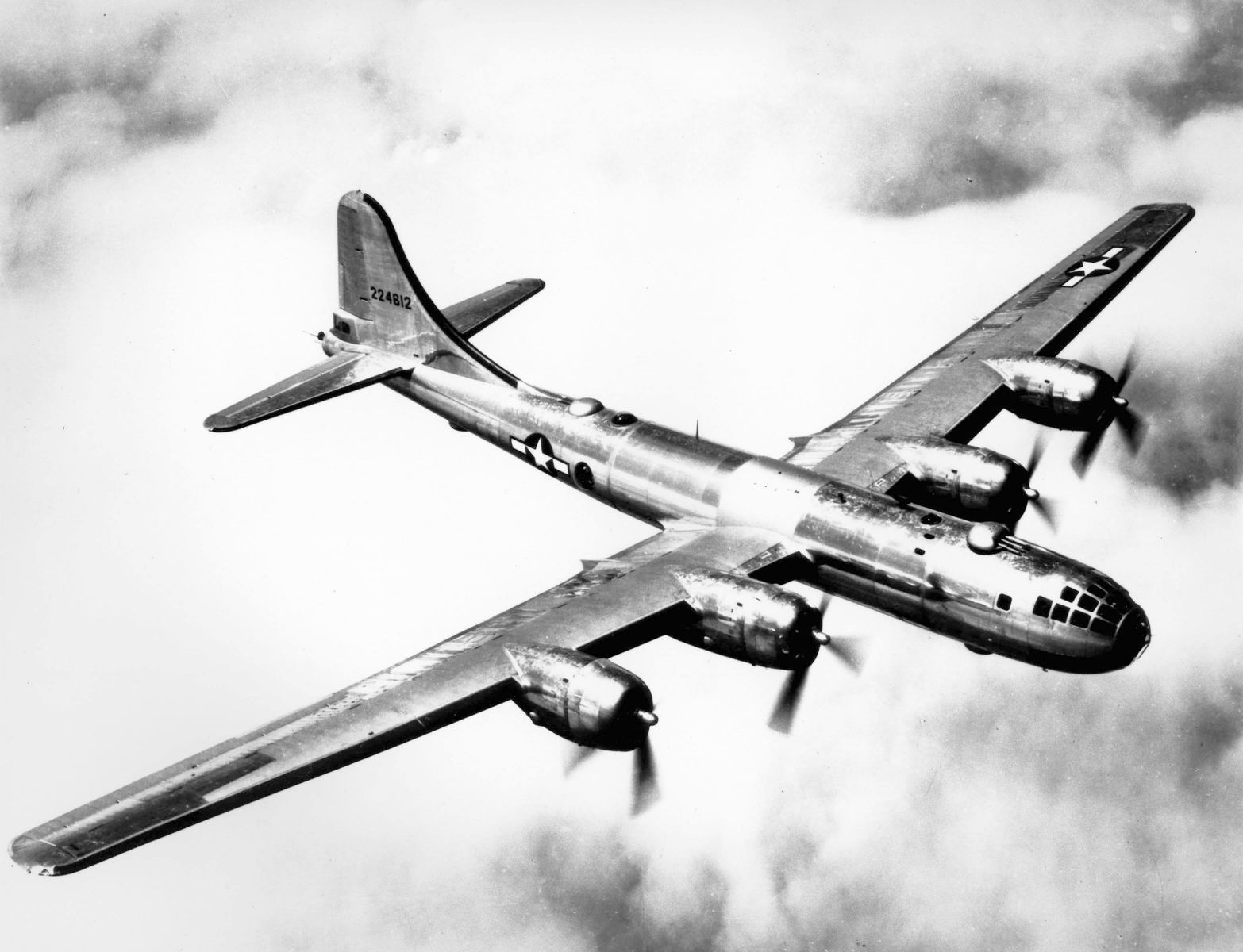
Boeing B-29 Superfortress Flying over west of the Pacific Ocean between 1944 and 1953

== Airplane history ==
Assigned to the 393d Bomb Squadron, 509th Composite Group, it was one of 15 Silverplate B-29s used by the 509th, Strange Cargo was built at the Glenn L. Martin Aircraft Plant at Omaha, Nebraska, as a Block 35 aircraft. It was one of 10 modified as a Silverplate and re-designated "Block 36". Delivered on April 2, 1945, to the USAAF, it was assigned to Crew A-4 (1st Lt. Joseph E. Westover), aircraft commander) and flown to Wendover Army Air Field, Utah. It left Wendover on June 5, 1945, for North Field, Tinian and arrived June 11.

It was originally assigned the Victor (unit-assigned identification) number 3 but on August 1 was given the large 'A' tail markings of the 497th Bomb Group as a security measure and had its Victor changed to 73 to avoid misidentification with actual 497th BG aircraft. It was named Strange Cargo and its nose art applied after the atomic bomb missions.

While at Tinian, Westover and crew A-4 flew Strange Cargo on 11 practice bombing missions and three combat pumpkin bomb missions against Japanese industrial targets at Nagasaki, Tsuruga, and Toyoda. The plane flew one other pumpkin bomb mission to Fukushima under Capt. Frederick C. Bock and crew C-13.

In November 1945 it returned with the 509th to Roswell Army Air Field, New Mexico. From March to August 1946 it was assigned to the Operation Crossroads task force, then rejoined the 509th BG at Roswell. In June 1949 Strange Cargo was transferred to the 97th Bombardment Group at Biggs Air Force Base, Texas, then sent to McClellan Air Force Base in August 1949 for modification to WB-29 specifications at the Sacramento Air Materiel Area.

Subsequent assignments as a WB-29 were to:

- 513th Reconnaissance Squadron, Tinker Air Force Base, Oklahoma (December 1950),
- 374th Reconnaissance Squadron, McClellan AFB, January 1951;
- 57th Strategic weather Squadron at Hickam Air Force Base, Hawaii (February 1951), with forward deployments to Kwajalein Atoll.
- Warner Robins Air Materiel Area, Robins Air Force Base, Georgia (May 1952),
- 58th Strategic Weather Squadron, Eielson Air Force Base, Alaska (September 1952).

Strange Cargo was modified again in August 1954, this time as a TB-29 trainer at Tinker AFB and at the Mobile Air Materiel Area, Nashville, Tennessee. It was then assigned to:

- 5th Tow Target Squadron at Wheelus Air Base, Libya (June 1955),
- 7280th Maintenance Group, Nouasseur Air Base, Morocco (October 1955);
- 3150th Maintenance Group, Nouasseur AB (January 1956); and
- 7235th Support Squadron, Wheelus AB (March 1956).

Its last assignment was to RAF Brize Norton, United Kingdom, where it was scrapped after an unspecified accident in August 1957.

== Other aircraft named Strange Cargo ==
An FB-111A strategic bomber of the USAF, serial 69-6508, carried the name and nose art of Strange Cargo on its nosewheel doors during its service with the 509th Bomb Wing at Pease Air Force Base, New Hampshire, in the 1970s and 1980s.
