= Some Punkins =

Some Punkins was the name of a B-29 Superfortress (B-29-36-MO 44-27296, Victor number 84) modified to carry an atomic bomb during World War II.

== Airplane history ==
Assigned to the 393d Bomb Squadron, 509th Composite Group, it was one of 15 Silverplate B-29s used by the 509th, Some Punkins was built at the Glenn L. Martin Aircraft Plant at Omaha, Nebraska, as a Block 35 aircraft. It was one of 10 modified as a Silverplate and re-designated "Block 36". Delivered on March 19, 1945, to the USAAF, it was assigned to Crew B-7 (Capt. James N. Price, Jr., aircraft commander) and flown to Wendover Army Air Field, Utah.

It left Wendover on June 8, 1945, for Tinian and arrived at North Field, Tinian, on June 14. It was originally assigned the Victor (unit-assigned identification) number 4 but on August 1 was given the large 'A' tail markings of the 497th Bomb Group as a security measure and had its Victor changed to 84 to avoid misidentification with actual 497th BG aircraft. It was named Some Punkins and its nose art applied after the atomic bomb missions. While a number of sources attribute the name to a 1930s comic strip, the nose art suggests a possible reference to the "pumpkin bomb" missions the 509th Composite Group flew as combat rehearsal for the atomic bomb operations. However, the phrase was also in use by 1917, based on letters from Indiana referring to someone being 'some punkins' to be called first to an accident, meaning 'important.'

While on Tinian it was used on 13 training and practice missions and five combat missions to drop pumpkin bombs on industrial targets on Toyama, Ōgaki, Shimoda, Yokkaichi, and Nagoya. Some Punkins was the only B-29 of the 393d BS flown exclusively by its assigned crew on all operational missions, and is cited by Joseph Baugher as possibly dropping the last bomb of World War II in its attack on Nagoya on August 14, 1945.

In November 1945 it returned with the 509th to Roswell Army Air Field, New Mexico. On March 1, 1946, while at Kirtland Army Air Field in preparation for assignment to Operation Crossroads, it was struck while parked by a taxiing B-29, incurring severe damage to its forward fuselage. The airplane was transferred to the 428th Base Unit at Kirtland in April 1946 and declared damaged beyond economical repair. In August it was deliberately set afire as part of firefighting training and totally destroyed.

== Other aircraft named Some Punkins ==
Two FB-111A strategic bombers of the USAF 509th Bomb Wing, serials 68-0241 and 68-0246, carried the name and original nose art of Some Punkins on their nosewheel doors while based at Pease Air Force Base, New Hampshire, in the 1970s and 1980s.

== Sources ==
- Campbell, Richard H., The Silverplate Bombers: A History and Registry of the Enola Gay and Other B-29s Configured to Carry Atomic Bombs (2005), ISBN 0-7864-2139-8
- 509th CG Aircraft Page, MPHPA
