= Full House (aircraft) =

B-29 Superfortress

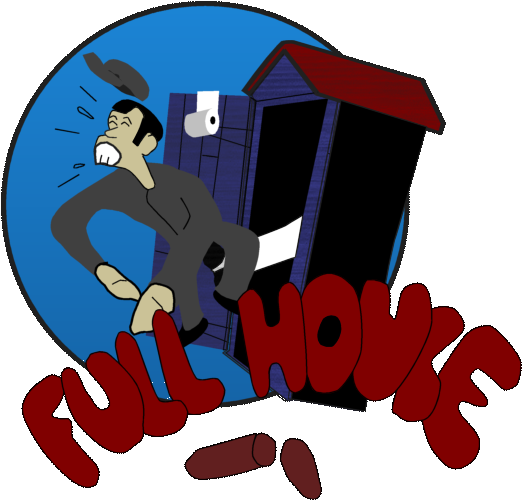
Full House nose art

Full House was the name of a B-29 Superfortress (B-29-36-MO 44-27298, victor number 83) participating in the atomic bomb attack on Hiroshima on August 6, 1945.

Assigned to the 393d Bomb Squadron, 509th Composite Group, it was used as a weather reconnaissance plane and flew to the city of Nagasaki, designated a "tertiary target", before the final bombing to determine if conditions were favorable for an attack. The aircraft also flew as a spare aircraft during the mission to bomb Nagasaki on August 9, 1945, but landed at Iwo Jima when the B-29 Bockscar was able to complete the mission.

== Airplane history ==
One of 15 Silverplate B-29s used by the 509th, Full House was built at the Glenn L. Martin Aircraft Plant at Omaha, Nebraska, as a Block 35 aircraft. It was one of 10 modified as a Silverplate and re-designated "Block 36". Delivered on March 20, 1945, to the USAAF, it was assigned to Crew A-1 (Captain Ralph R. Taylor, aircraft commander) and flown to Wendover Army Air Field, Utah. It left Wendover on June 11, 1945, for North Field, Tinian and arrived June 17.

It was originally assigned the Victor (unit-assigned identification) number 13 but on August 1 was given the square P tail markings of the 39th Bomb Group as a security measure and had its Victor changed to 83 to avoid misidentification with actual 39th BG aircraft. It was named Full House and its nose art applied after the atomic bomb missions.

In addition to its roles on the Hiroshima and Nagasaki missions, Capt. Taylor and crew A-1 flew the bomber on 12 practice and training missions, and four combat missions in which it dropped pumpkin bombs on industrial targets at Toyama, Niihama, Yaizu, and Ube, Yamaguchi. Capt. Frederick C. Bock and crew C-13 flew Full House on a pumpkin bomb mission to Komoro, Nagano.

In November 1945 it returned to the United States with the 509th CG to Roswell Army Airfield. In June 1949 it was transferred to the 97th Bomb Group at Biggs Air Force Base, Texas, then re-configured as a TB-29 trainer in April 1950 by The Oklahoma City Air Materiel Area at Tinker Air Force Base.

It subsequently served as part of:

- 106th Radar Calibration Squadron, Sioux City Air Force Base, Iowa (August 1952),
- 7th Radar Calibration Squadron, Sioux City AFB (September 1953)
- 4677th Radar Evaluation Flight, Hill Air Force Base, Utah (March 1954),
- Mobile Air Materiel Area, Nashville, Tennessee (March 1955), and
- 17th Tow Target Squadron, Vincent Air Force Base, Arizona (July 1955).

Full House was dropped from the Air Force inventory in November 1956. It was transferred to the U.S. Navy and used as a target at the Naval Ordnance Test Station at China Lake, California.

=== Hiroshima mission crew ===
Crew A-1 (regularly assigned to Full House)

- Capt. Wolcott A. Depree II., Aircraft Pilot
- Capt. Ralph R. Taylor Jr., Aircraft Commander
- 2nd Lt. Raymond P. Biel, Co-Pilot
- 1st Lt. Fred A. Hoey, Navigator
- 1st Lt. Michael Angelich, Bombardier
- M/Sgt. Frank M. Briese, Flight Engineer
- S/Sgt. Theodore M. Slife, Radio Operator
- Cpl. Nathaniel T. R. Burgwyn, Radar Operator
- T/Sgt. Robert J. Valley, Tail Gunner
- Cpl. Richard B. Anselme, Assistant Engineer/Scanner

== Other aircraft named Full House ==
- A FB-111A strategic bomber of the USAF 509th Bomb Wing, serial 68-0270, carried the name and original nose art of Full House on its nosewheel doors while based at Pease Air Force Base, New Hampshire, in the 1970s and 1980s.
- A Boeing B-17 strategic bomber in the ETO during World War II. Its successful arrival at Poltava Air Base after a catastrophic oxygen-fueled explosion and fire allowed authorities to identify the source of the design's "fatal flaw", which had mysteriously downed other aircraft during bombing missions. The airplane was repaired and returned to the front, where it was later lost in combat.

== Sources ==
- Campbell, Richard H., The Silverplate Bombers: A History and Registry of the Enola Gay and Other B-29s Configured to Carry Atomic Bombs (2005), ISBN 0-7864-2139-8
- 509th CG Aircraft Page, MPHPA
