= George R. Caron =

United States Army Air Forces soldier

Bob Caron
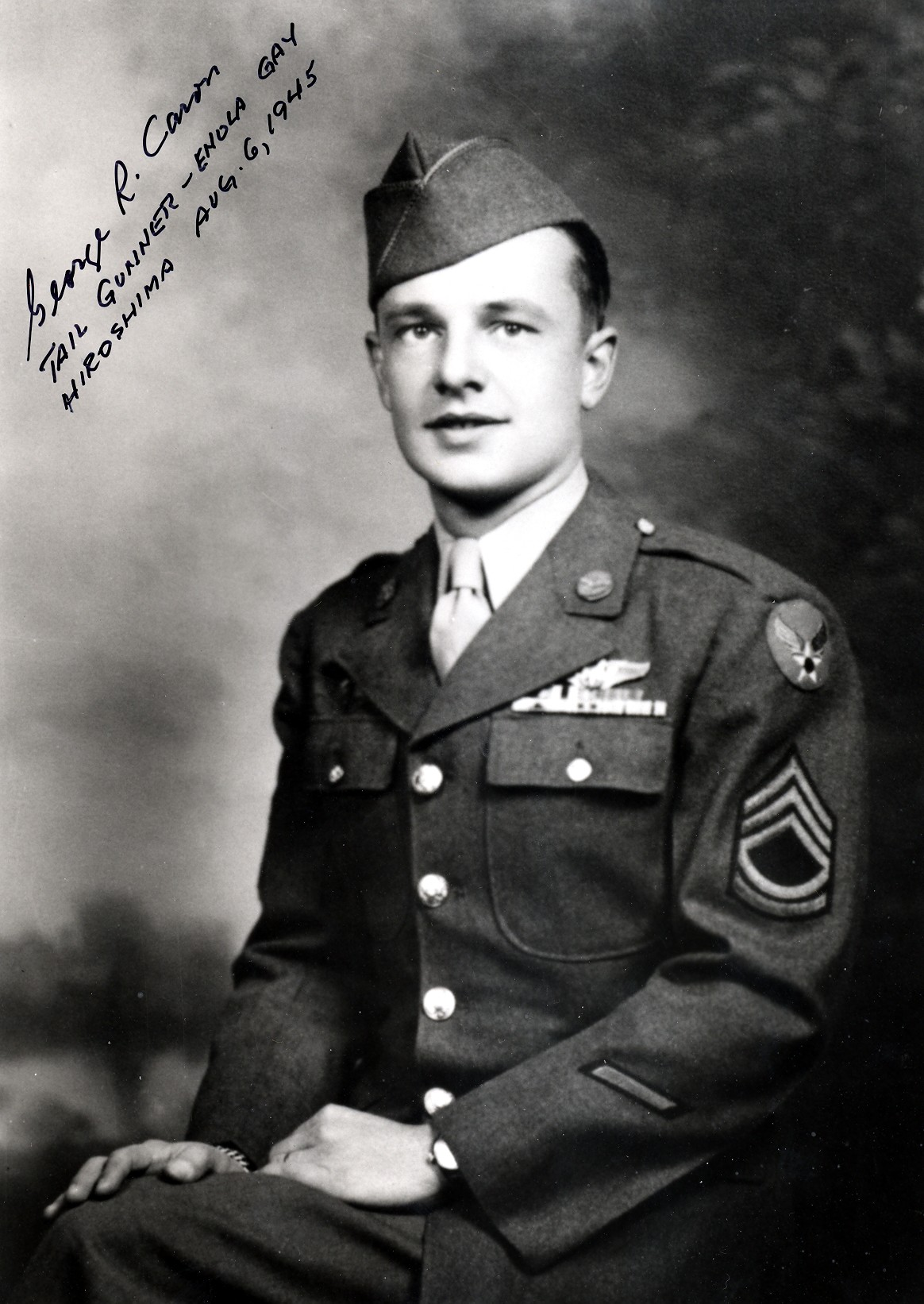
- Born: October 31, 1919; Brooklyn, New York
- Died: June 3, 1995 (aged 75); Denver, Colorado
- Military career
- Allegiance: United States
- Branch: United States Army Air Forces
- Rank: Technical Sergeant
- Unit: 509th Composite Group
- Conflicts: World War II
- Awards: Silver Star

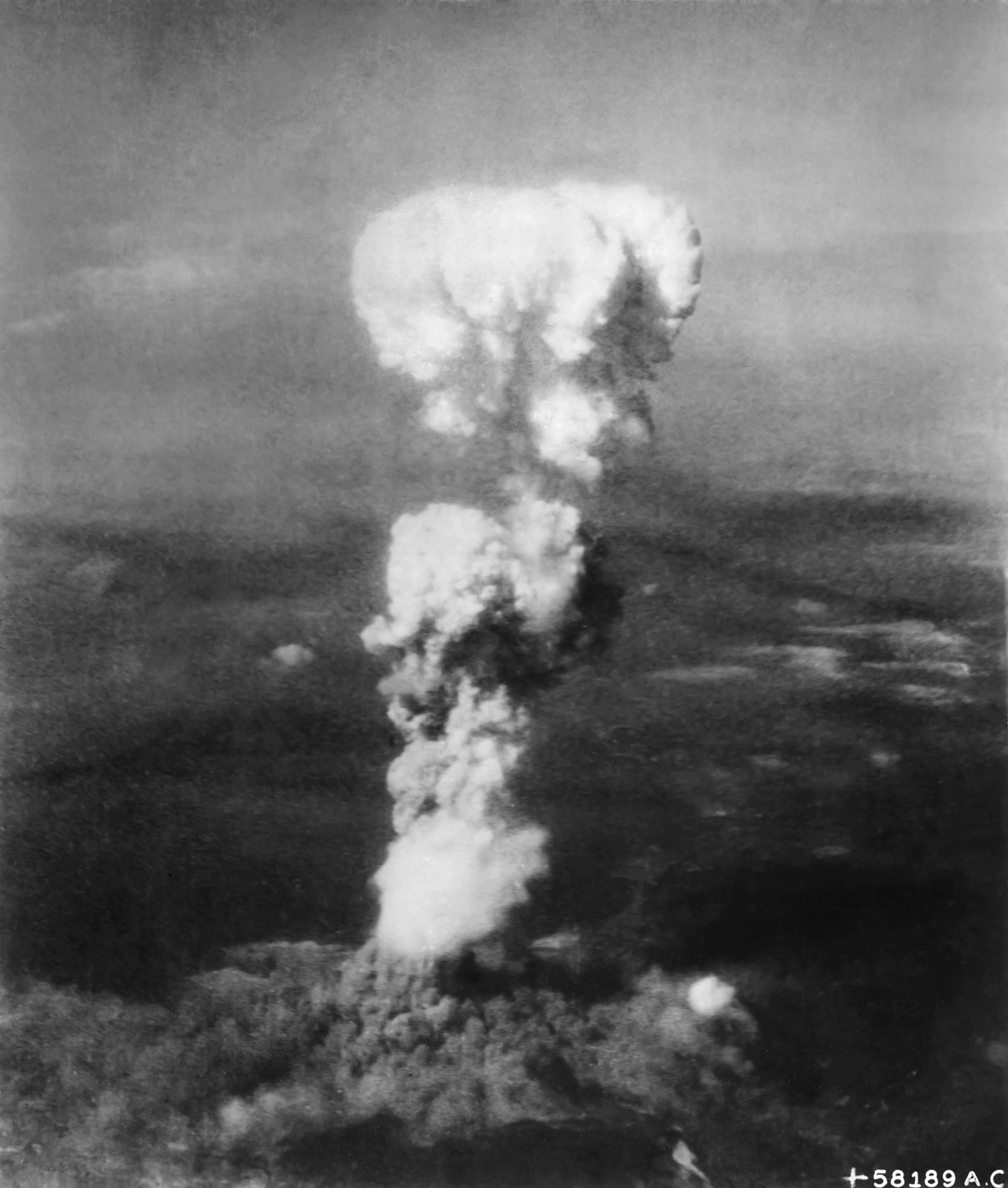
The mushroom cloud over Hiroshima after the dropping of "Little Boy", photographed by Bob Caron

Technical Sergeant George Robert Caron (October 31, 1919 – June 3, 1995) was the tail gunner, the only defender of the twelve crewmen, aboard the B-29 Enola Gay during the bombing of the Japanese city of Hiroshima on 6 August 1945. Facing the rear of the B-29, his vantage point made him the first airborne person to witness the mushroom cloud over Hiroshima.

Caron was also the only photographer aboard, and took photographs as the mushroom cloud rose. Of the four 509th Composite Group aircraft assigned to the Hiroshima bombing, Caron's camera and two others captured the explosion on film. Immediately before the mission, the 509th's photography officer, Lieutenant Jerome Ossip, asked then Staff Sergeant Caron to carry a handheld Fairchild K-20 camera. After the mission, Ossip developed photos from all the aircraft, but found that the fixed cameras failed to record anything. Film from another handheld was mishandled in developing, making Caron's the only official still photographs of the explosion. 2nd Lt. Russell Gackenback, Navigator aboard then unnamed Necessary Evil, took two still photographs of the cloud about one minute after detonation using his personal AFGA 620 camera. A handheld 16 mm film camera on The Great Artiste captured the only known motion film of the explosion. Caron's photographs of the explosion were printed on millions of leaflets that were dropped over Japan the next day.

Caron graduated from Brooklyn Technical High School (Brooklyn, New York) in 1938.

In May 1995, he published the book Fire of a Thousand Suns, The George R. "Bob" Caron Story, Tail Gunner of the Enola Gay about his "eye-witness account of the momentous event when the world was catapulted into the Atomic Age, the introduction of atomic capability, the technical development of the B-29, and the events that put him into the tail gun turret of the Enola Gay."
