= Next Objective =

American atomic bomber plane

General information
- Type: Boeing B-29-36-MO Superfortress
- Manufacturer: Glenn L. Martin Company
- Owners: United States Army Air Force (USAAF)
- Serial: 44-27299
- Radio code: Victor 86

History
- In service: 20 March 1945 - 25 May 1949
- Fate: Crashed after an engine fire on 25 May 1949

Next Objective was the name of a Boeing B-29-36-MO Superfortress, 44-27299, Victor 86, modified to carry the atomic bomb in World War II.

== Airplane history ==
Assigned to the 393d Bomb Squadron, 509th Composite Group, it was one of 15 Silverplate B-29s used by the 509th. Next Objective was built at the Glenn L. Martin Aircraft Plant at Omaha, Nebraska, as a Block 35 aircraft. It was one of 10 modified as a Silverplate and re-designated "Block 36". Delivered on 20 March 1945, to the USAAF, it was assigned to crew A-3 (1st Lt. Ralph N. Devore, aircraft commander) and flown to Wendover Army Air Field, Utah. It left Wendover on 11 June 1945 for North Field, Tinian and arrived 17 June.

It was originally assigned the Victor (unit-assigned identification) number 6 but on 1 August was given the triangle N tail markings of the 444th Bomb Group as a security measure and had its Victor changed to 86 to avoid misidentification with actual 444th BG aircraft. It was named Next Objective and its nose art applied after the atomic bomb missions.

While at Tinian, Devore and crew A-3 flew Next Objective on 12 practice bombing missions and three pumpkin bomb missions against Japanese industrial targets at Toyama, Niihama, and Nagoya, and one which was aborted. Major Charles Sweeney, commanding officer of the 393d BS, used the bomber to rehearse procedures using a dummy "Little Boy" test assembly on 26 and 29 July. On the latter mission Next Objective landed on Iwo Jima where the inert bomb was unloaded, then reloaded to practice a contingency in which a spare aircraft would take over the mission.

In November 1945 it returned with the 509th to Roswell Army Air Field, New Mexico. From March to August 1946 it was assigned to the Operation Crossroads task force, then rejoined the 509th BG at Roswell. In April 1949 Next Objective was transferred to the 97th Bomb Group at Biggs Air Force Base, Texas.

On 25 May 1949, 44-27299 was assigned to a navigation training mission. Shortly after takeoff an engine fire broke out in the right outboard engine, resulting in a crew bailout. The navigator assigned struck his head on the machinery that operated the nose landing gear as he exited the aircraft and was killed when his parachute did not deploy. The pilotless Next Objective circled in a two-mile orbit before crashing 35 miles northeast of El Paso, where it exploded on impact.

== Other aircraft named Next Objective ==
Two FB-111A strategic bombers of the USAF 509th Bomb Wing, serials 68-0257 and 68-0284, carried the name Next Objective on their nosewheel doors, and 68-0257 carried the B-29 nose art, while based at Pease Air Force Base, New Hampshire, in the 1970s and 1980s.

== Sources ==
- Campbell, Richard H., The Silverplate Bombers: A History and Registry of the Enola Gay and Other B-29s Configured to Carry Atomic Bombs (2005), ISBN 0-7864-2139-8
- 509th CG Aircraft Page, MPHPA
