= Pumpkin bomb =

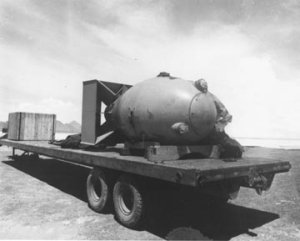
- A pumpkin bomb
- Type: Conventional high-explosive bomb Ballistic simulator
- Place of origin: United States

Service history
- In service: 1945
- Used by: United States Army Air Forces
- Wars: World War II

Production history
- No. built: 486

Specifications
- Mass: 5.26 long tons (5.34 t)
- Length: 10 feet 8 inches (3.25 m)
- Diameter: 60 inches (152 cm)
- Filling: Composition B
- Filling weight: 6,300 pounds (2,900 kg)

Pumpkin bombs were large conventional aerial bombs developed by the Manhattan Project and used by the United States Army Air Forces against Japan during World War II. Their physical characteristics closely matched those of the Fat Man plutonium-based nuclear bomb, with the same ballistic and handling characteristics, but the payload was 6,300 pounds (2,900 kg) of conventional high explosives. While their main purpose was for testing and training in preparation for the 509th Composite Group potentially delivering a Fat Man on a target, (Note: On 9 August 1945, Bockscar completed the sole Fat Man mission, bombing Nagasaki) post-war analysis deemed the pumpkin bombs to have been effective weapons in their own right. The name "pumpkin bomb" used in official documents derived from the large, fat ellipsoidal shape of the munition casing required to enclose the Fat Man's spherical "physics package" (the plutonium implosion nuclear weapon core), compared to the usual slimmer cylindrical shape of conventional bombs.

== Development ==
Pumpkin bombs were a means of providing realistic training with non-nuclear bombs for the 509th Composite Group's Boeing B-29 Superfortress crews assigned to drop the atomic bomb. The pumpkin bomb had a similar size and weight distribution as a Fat Man plutonium bomb, giving it the same ballistic and handling characteristics. Specifications for the bomb required that it be carried in the forward bomb bay of a Silverplate (nuclear-enabled) B-29 bomber and be fuzed to be effective against actual targets.

Pumpkin bombs were produced in both inert and high-explosive variants. The inert versions were filled with a cement-plaster-sand mixture that was combined with water to 1.67 to 1.68 grams per cubic centimetre (0.060 to 0.061 lb/cu in), the density of the Composition B high-explosive versions. The filler of both variants had the same weight and weight distribution as the inner spherical "physics package" of the Fat Man plutonium bomb.

The concept for the high-explosive pumpkin bomb was originated in December 1944 by United States Navy Captain William S. Parsons, the head of the Ordnance Division at Manhattan Project's Los Alamos Laboratory, and United States Army Air Forces Lieutenant Colonel Paul W. Tibbets, commander of the 509th Composite Group. Prior testing was carried out with an inert version.

The name "pumpkin bomb" originated with Parsons and Dr. Charles C. Lauritsen of the California Institute of Technology, who managed the development team. The name was used for the training bombs in official meetings and documents, and probably derived from its large ellipsoidal shape. On the other hand, anecdotal sources attribute the naming of the bombs to a pumpkin color: While the bombs were painted olive drab or khaki in the field, photographs show that at least the units delivered to Tinian were shipped in the same yellow zinc chromate primer color worn by Fat Man.

While many Manhattan scientists expected that the development of the means of delivery of the atomic bomb would be straightforward, Parsons, with his experience of the proximity fuze program, expected that it would involve considerable effort. The test program was initiated on 13 August 1943 at the Naval Proving Ground in Dahlgren, Virginia, where a scale model of the Fat Man plutonium bomb was developed. On 3 March 1944, testing moved to Muroc Army Air Field, California. Initial tests found that the Fat Man assembly was unstable in flight, and that its fuzes did not work properly.

== Production ==
The shells of the pumpkin bomb were manufactured by two Los Angeles firms, Consolidated Steel Corporation and Western Pipe and Steel Company, while the 'California Parachute' tail assembly was produced by Centerline Company of Detroit. After initial development, management of the program was turned over to the U.S. Navy Bureau of Ordnance in May 1945. A total of 486 live and inert training bombs were eventually delivered, at a cost of between US$1,000 and $2,000 apiece.

All of the inert versions went from the manufacturers directly to Wendover Army Air Field, Utah, by rail, where they were used by the 216th Base Unit in flight testing of the bomb. Some test drop missions were flown by the 509th Composite Group's 393d Bombardment Squadron as training exercises. The bombs intended as live ordnance were shipped to the Naval Ammunition Depot, McAlester, Oklahoma, for filling with explosives. The Composition B was poured as a slurry, solidified in a drying facility for 36 hours, sealed, and shipped by railroad to the Port Chicago Naval Magazine, California, for shipment by sea to Tinian.

== Description ==
The pumpkin bombs were externally similar to the Fat Man bomb in size and shape, and both had the same 52-inch (130 cm) California Parachute square tail assembly and single-point attachment lug. The pumpkin bomb had three contact fuzes arranged in an equilateral triangle around the nose of the bomb, while the atomic bomb had four fuse housings. The atomic bomb had its shell sections bolted together and sealed with externally-applied, sprayed-on liquid asphalt, but most if not all of the pumpkin bombs were welded, with a four-inch hole used for filling the shell. The Fat Man also had four external mounting points for radar antennas which the pumpkin bombs did not have.

The pumpkin bombs were 10 feet 8 inches (3.25 m) in length and 60 inches (152 cm) in maximum diameter. They weighed 5.26 long tons (5,340 kg), consisting of 3,800 pounds (1,700 kg) for the shell, 425 pounds (193 kg) for the tail assembly, and 6,300 pounds (2,900 kg) of Composition B filler. The shells were made of .375-inch (9.5 mm) steel plate and the tail assemblies from .200-inch (5.1 mm) aluminum plate.

== Combat missions ==
Combat missions were flown by the 509th Composite Group on 20, 23, 26 and 29 July and 8 and 14 August 1945, using the bombs against individual targets in Japanese cities. A total of 49 bombs were dropped on 14 targets, one bomb was jettisoned into the ocean, and two were aboard aircraft that aborted their missions.

Mission parameters and protocols were similar to those of the actual atomic bomb missions, and all targets were located in the vicinity of the cities designated for atomic attack. The bombs were released at an altitude of 30,000 feet (9,100 m) and the aircraft then went into the sharp turn required on a nuclear mission. After the war, the Strategic Bombing Survey concluded that the pumpkin bombs were "a reasonably effective weapon against Japanese plants when direct hits were scored on vital areas, or when the near miss was sufficiently close to important buildings to cause severe structural damage."

Pumpkin bomb sorties
Date	Target	Aircraft name	Aircraft #	Crew	Commander	Method
20 July 1945	Toyama	Some Punkins	44-27296	B-7	James N. Price Jr.	Radar
24 July 1945	Ogaki	Some Punkins	44-27296	B-7	James N. Price Jr.	Radar
26 July 1945	Shimada	Some Punkins	44-27296	B-7	James N. Price Jr.	Visual
8 August 1945	Yokkaichi	Some Punkins	44-27296	B-7	James N. Price Jr.	Visual
14 August 1945	Nagoya	Some Punkins	44-27296	B-7	James N. Price Jr.	Visual
24 July 1945	Fukushima	Bockscar	44-27297	C-13	Frederick C. Bock	Visual
26 July 1945	Toyama	Bockscar	44-27297	C-15	Charles D. Albury	Radar
29 July 1945	Musashino	Bockscar	44-27297	C-13	Frederick C. Bock	Visual
20 July 1945	Toyama	Full House	44-27298	A-1	Ralph R. Taylor Jr.	Visual
24 July 1945	Niihama	Full House	44-27298	A-1	Ralph R. Taylor Jr.	Visual
26 July 1945	Yaizu	Full House	44-27298	A-1	Ralph R. Taylor Jr.	Radar
29 July 1945	Ube	Full House	44-27298	A-1	Ralph R. Taylor Jr.	Visual
29 July 1945	Koroma	Full House	44-27298	C-13	Frederick C. Bock	Visual
20 July 1945	Toyama	Next Objective	44-27299	A-3	Ralph N. Devore	Visual
24 July 1945	Niihama	Next Objective	44-27299	A-3	Ralph N. Devore	Visual
14 August 1945	Nagoya	Next Objective	44-27299	A-3	Ralph N. Devore	Visual
20 July 1945	Fukushima	Strange Cargo	44-27300	C-13	Frederick C. Bock	Radar
24 July 1945	Kobe	Strange Cargo	44-27300	A-4	Joseph E. Westover	Visual
8 August 1945	Tsuruga	Strange Cargo	44-27300	A-4	Joseph E. Westover	Visual
14 August 1945	Nagoya	Strange Cargo	44-27300	A-4	Joseph E. Westover	Visual
20 July 1945	Tokyo	Straight Flush	44-27301	C-11	Claude R. Eatherly	Radar
24 July 1945	Otsu	Straight Flush	44-27301	C-11	Claude R. Eatherly	Visual
26 July 1945	Tsugawa	Straight Flush	44-27301	C-11	Claude R. Eatherly	Visual
29 July 1945	Maizuru	Straight Flush	44-27301	C-11	Claude R. Eatherly	Visual
14 August 1945	Koroma	Straight Flush	44-27301	C-15	Charles D. Albury	Radar
20 July 1945	Otsu	Top Secret	44-27302	B-8	Charles F. McKnight	Radar
24 July 1945	Yokkaichi	Top Secret	44-27302	B-8	Charles F. McKnight	Visual
26 July 1945	Taira	Top Secret	44-27302	A-4	Joseph E. Westover	Visual
29 July 1945	Ube	Top Secret	44-27302	B-8	Charles F. McKnight	Visual
8 August 1945	Yokkaichi	Top Secret	44-27302	C-11	Claude R. Eatherly	Visual
14 August 1945	Koroma	Top Secret	44-27302	B-8	Charles F. McKnight	Visual
20 July 1945	Taira	Jabit III	44-27303	B-6	John A. Wilson	Radar
26 July 1945	Osaka	Jabit III	44-27303	A-3	Ralph N. Devore	Visual
29 July 1945	Ube	Jabit III	44-27303	B-6	John A. Wilson	Visual
8 August 1945	Uwajima	Jabit III	44-27303	B-6	John A. Wilson	Visual
20 July 1945	Taira	Up An' Atom	44-27304	B-10	George W. Marquardt	Radar
26 July 1945	Hamamatsu	Up An' Atom	44-27304	B-10	George W. Marquardt	Radar
29 July 1945	Wakayama	Up An' Atom	44-27304	A-5	Elbert B. Smith	Visual
8 August 1945	Tokushima	Up An' Atom	44-27304	B-9	Robert A. Lewis	Visual
14 August 1945	Nagoya	Up An' Atom	44-27304	C-14	James I. Hopkins Jr,	Visual
24 July 1945	Kobe	The Great Artiste	44-27353	C-15	Charles D. Albury	Visual
29 July 1945	Koriyama	The Great Artiste	44-27353	B-9	Robert A. Lewis	Visual
20 July 1945	Nagaoka	Big Stink	44-27354	A-5	Thomas J. Classen	Radar
26 July 1945	Hitachi	Big Stink	44-27354	A-5	Thomas J. Classen	Visual
24 July 1945	Kobe	Necessary Evil	44-86291	C-14	Norman W. Ray	Visual
26 July 1945	Kashiwazaki	Necessary Evil	44-86291	C-14	Norman W. Ray	Radar
29 July 1945	Koriyama	Necessary Evil	44-86291	C-14	Norman W. Ray	Visual
24 July 1945	Kobe	Enola Gay	44-86292	B-9	Robert A. Lewis	Visual
26 July 1945	Koriyama	Enola Gay	44-86292	B-9	Robert A. Lewis	Visual

== See also ==
- Blockbuster bomb
- FAB-5000
- Tallboy
