= Top Secret (aircraft) =

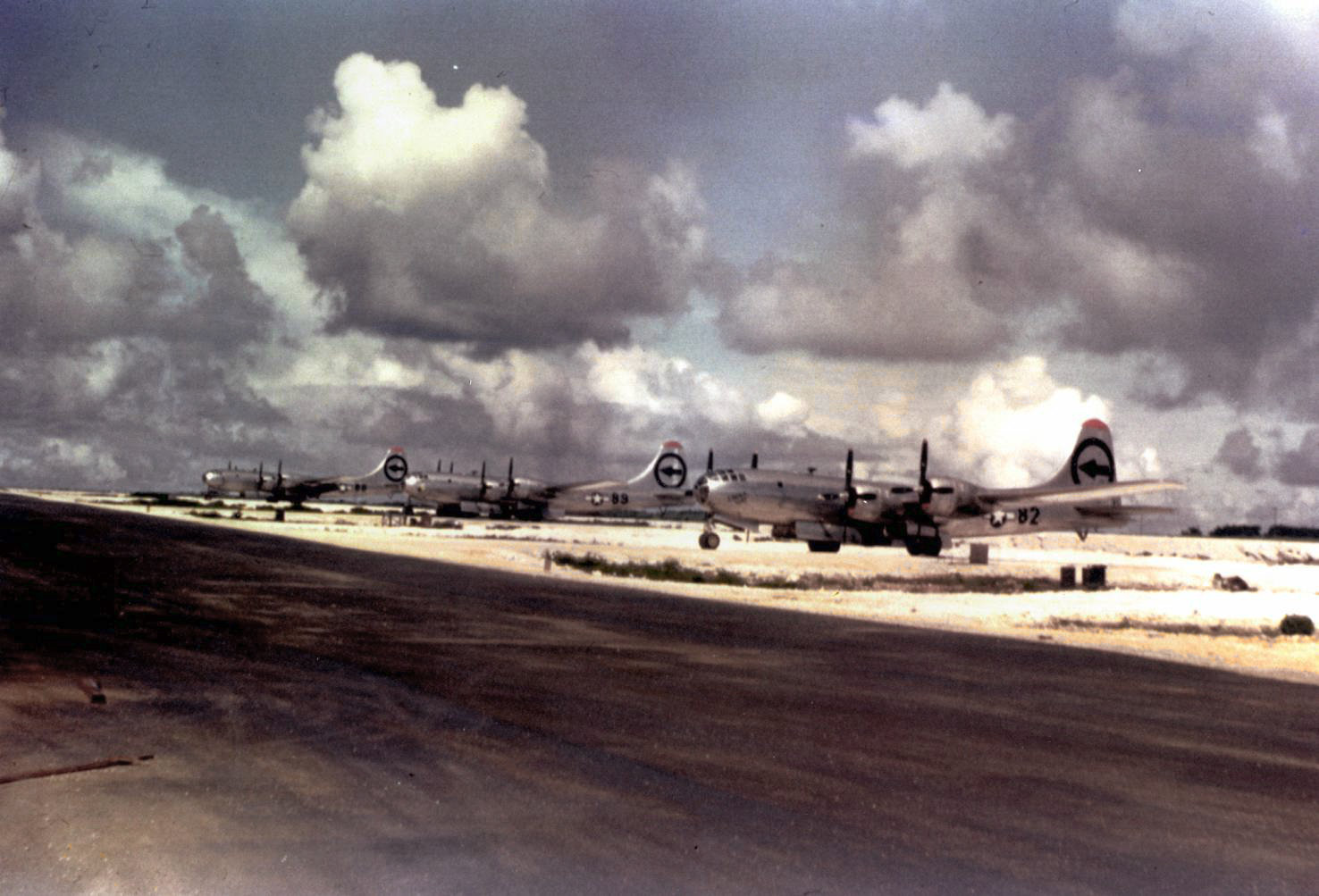
509th Composite Group B-29s on Tinian after the atomic bomb missions

Top Secret was the name of a Boeing B-29 Superfortress (B-29-36-MO 44–27302, "victor number' 72) modified to carry the atomic bomb in World War II. It served with the Army Air Forces and United States Air Force from 1945 until 1954.

== Airplane history ==
The plane was assigned to the 393d Bomb Squadron of the 509th Composite Group. It was one of fifteen Silverplate B-29s used by the 509th. Top Secret was built at the Glenn L. Martin Company aircraft plant at Omaha, Nebraska, as a Block 35 aircraft. It was one of 10 aircraft modified as a Silverplate and designated with Block number 36. The plane was delivered to the Army Air Forces on 2 April 1945. The 509th assigned it to crew B-8 (1st Lt. Charles F. McKnight, aircraft commander) and it was flown to Wendover Army Air Field, Utah. It left Wendover on 5 June 1945, for North Field, Tinian and arrived 11 June.

It was originally assigned the "victor (unit-assigned identification) number" 2 but on 1 August was given the large 'Square A' tail markings of the 497th Bombardment Group as a security measure and had its "victor number" changed to 72 to avoid misidentification with actual 497th aircraft. It was named Top Secret and its nose art was applied after the atomic bomb missions.

While at Tinian, McKnight and crew B-8 flew Top Secret on 13 practice bombing missions and four combat pumpkin bomb missions against Japanese industrial targets at Otsu, Yokkaichi, Ube, and Toyoda. The plane flew two other pumpkin bomb missions, to Taira (1st Lt. Joseph E. Westover and crew A-4) and Yokkaichi (Capt. Claude Eatherly and crew C-11).

In November 1945 Top Secret returned with the 509th to Roswell Army Air Field, New Mexico. From March to August 1946 it was assigned to the Operation Crossroads task force, then it rejoined the 509th at Roswell. In June 1949 Top Secret was transferred to the 97th Bombardment Group at Biggs Air Force Base, Texas. It was sent to Tinker Air Force Base, Oklahoma in April 1950 for modification to TB-29 trainer specification by the Oklahoma City Air Materiel Area.

The plane's subsequent assignments were to the 2d Radar Calibration Squadron, Elmendorf Air Force Base in March 1953, and the 5025th Maintenance Group at Elmendorf in August 1953.

In September 1953 it was sent to the 3040th Aircraft Storage Group at Davis-Monthan Air Force Base, Arizona, where it was scrapped in July 1954.

== Other aircraft named Top Secret ==
A General Dynamics FB-111A strategic bomber of the United States Air Force, serial 69–6513, carried the name Top Secret on its nosewheel doors during its service with both the 509th Bombardment Wing at Pease Air Force Base, New Hampshire, and the 380th Bombardment Wing at Plattsburgh Air Force Base, New York in the 1970s and 1980s.

== Sources ==
- Campbell, Richard H., The Silverplate Bombers: A History and Registry of the Enola Gay and Other B-29s Configured to Carry Atomic Bombs (2005), ISBN 0-7864-2139-8
