= USAAF unit identification aircraft markings =

World War II US aircraft markings

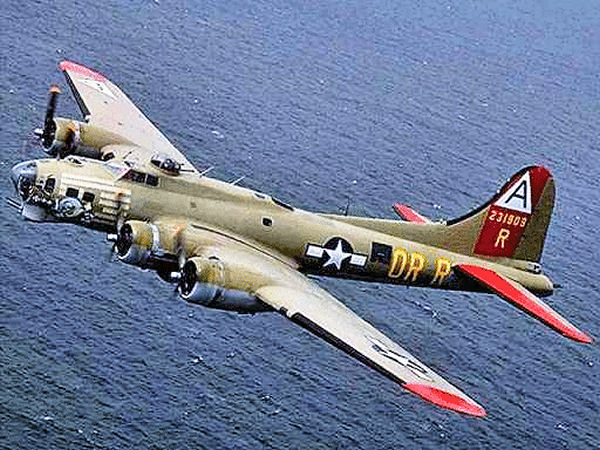
A Boeing B-17G in the markings of the 91st Bomb Group and displaying fuselage codes, tail symbols, and 1st Combat Bomb Wing color markings

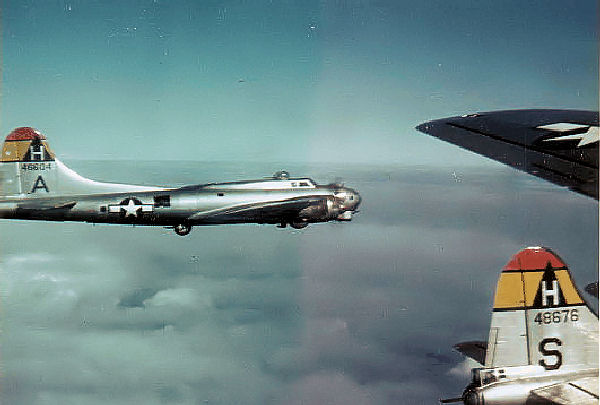
B-17G Flying Fortresses 44-46604 and 44-48676 of the 306th Bomb Group, in 40th CBW markings-RAF Thurleigh UK

USAAF unit identification aircraft markings, commonly called "tail markings" after their most frequent location, were numbers, letters, geometric symbols, and colors painted onto the tails (vertical stabilizer fins, rudders and horizontal surfaces), wings, or fuselages of the aircraft of the United States Army Air Forces (USAAF) during the Second World War.

Tail codes and markings provided a visual means of identification in conjunction with the call procedures, and later assembly and combat visual identification of units and aircraft.

These should not be confused with squadron codes and letters used in the RAF systems and areas, which serve a different function. The purpose of these markings was to serve as call signs in the Royal Air Force (RAF) radio procedures in the UK. Two-letter squadron codes were used to denote a squadron; some squadron codes later consisted of a letter and a numeral. An additional single letter, known as the Radio Call Letter (RCL), was to identify the aircraft within the squadron, used phonetically in radio calls.

As the buildup of troops continued in the Europe, Africa, Middle East Campaign (EAME), the United States Strategic Air Forces in Europe (USSTAF) bomber formations grew and assembly necessitated better visual unit identification at greater distance.

To facilitate control among thousands of bombers, the USAAF devised a system of aircraft tail markings in 1943 to identify groups and wings. Both the Eighth and Fifteenth Air Forces used a system of large, readily-identifiable symbols combined with alphanumerics to designate groups when all USAAF bombers were painted drab olive. However, as unpainted ("natural metal finish") aircraft became policy at the start of 1944, the system evolved gradually to one using large areas of color in conjunction with symbols or patterns of color identifying the wing and often different colors for the group.

The Twentieth Air Force, eventually operating 20 groups and 1,000 bombers, also adopted a tail identification system overseas. The other six numbered air forces fighting in the Pacific War also used tail markings within the various air forces both as group and squadron identifiers. The patterns or themes varied; some were designated at the Air Force level, some at the Command level, and others down at Group or squadron level. As in Europe, geometric shapes and colors were used as were letters, numbers and variations based on the RCN or serial number last three or four digits. Some pre-war bands and stripes were reinstated.

== Eighth Air Force tail markings ==
The first Eighth Air Force aircraft to receive unit markings were the Supermarine Spitfires of the 4th and 31st Fighter Groups training with RAF Fighter Command in September 1942. The markings were two-letter fuselage squadron codes located on one side of the national insignia and a single letter aircraft code on the other side. However sixteen squadrons of B-17s of the new VIII Bomber Command, beginning in December 1942, also received this identification system, which continued in the spring and summer of 1943 when VIII Bomber Command quadrupled in size.

However the size of the Allied air forces began to exhaust possible two-letter combinations, and made difficult the timely assembly of heavy bomber tactical formations. In June 1943 VIII Bomber Command introduced the use of a geometric symbol painted on either side of a bomber's vertical fin to denote a bombardment wing (later division) identification marking. These devices were white in color and 80 inches wide. A triangle denoted the Boeing B-17 Flying Fortress 1st Bombardment Wing (later 1st Air Division), a circle the Consolidated B-24 Liberator 2nd Bombardment Wing, and a square the B-17 4th Bombardment Wing (later 3rd Air Division). The Martin B-26 Marauder medium bombers of the 3rd Bombardment Wing did not use this scheme.

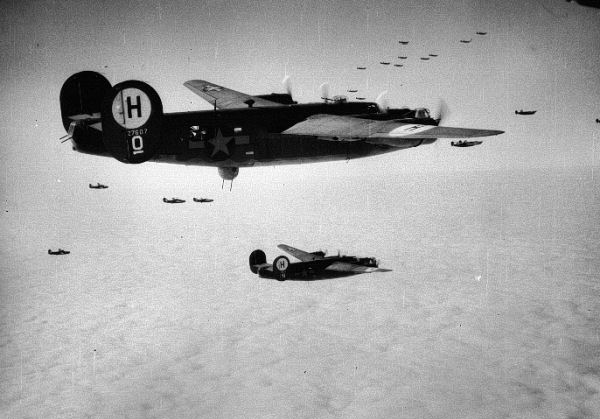
446th Bomb Group B-24s displaying the 1943 division and group marking scheme

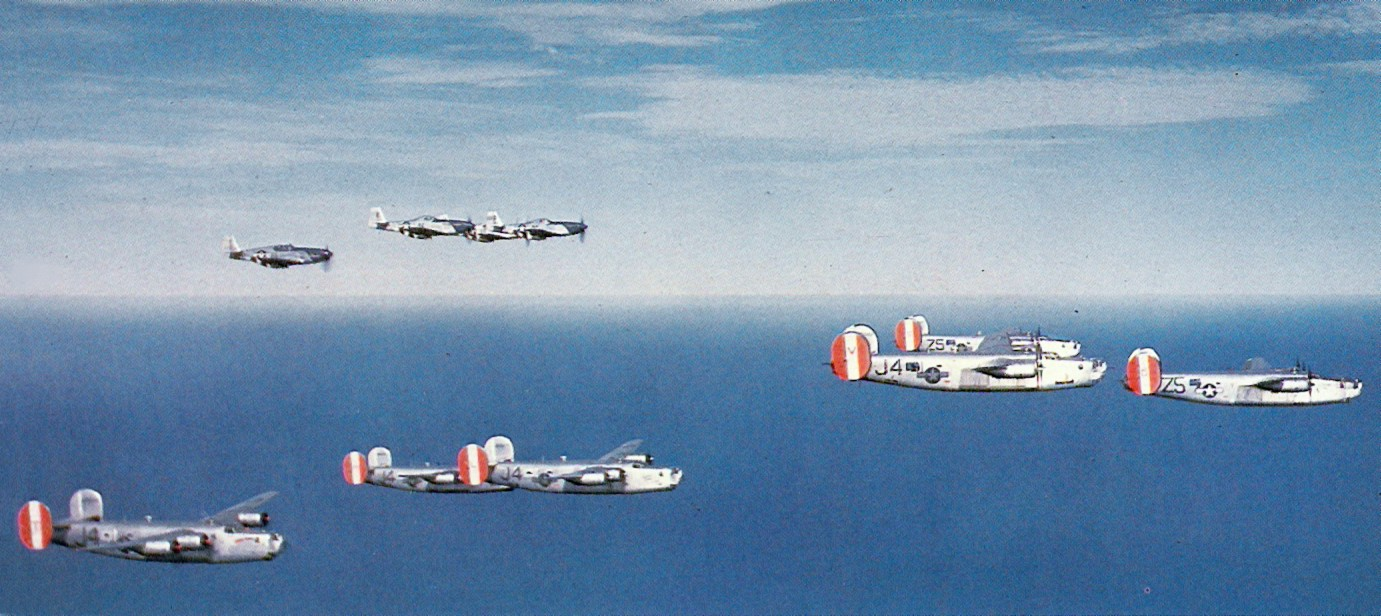
B-24s of the 458th Bomb Group, 96th Combat Bomb Wing, in 1944-45 color scheme

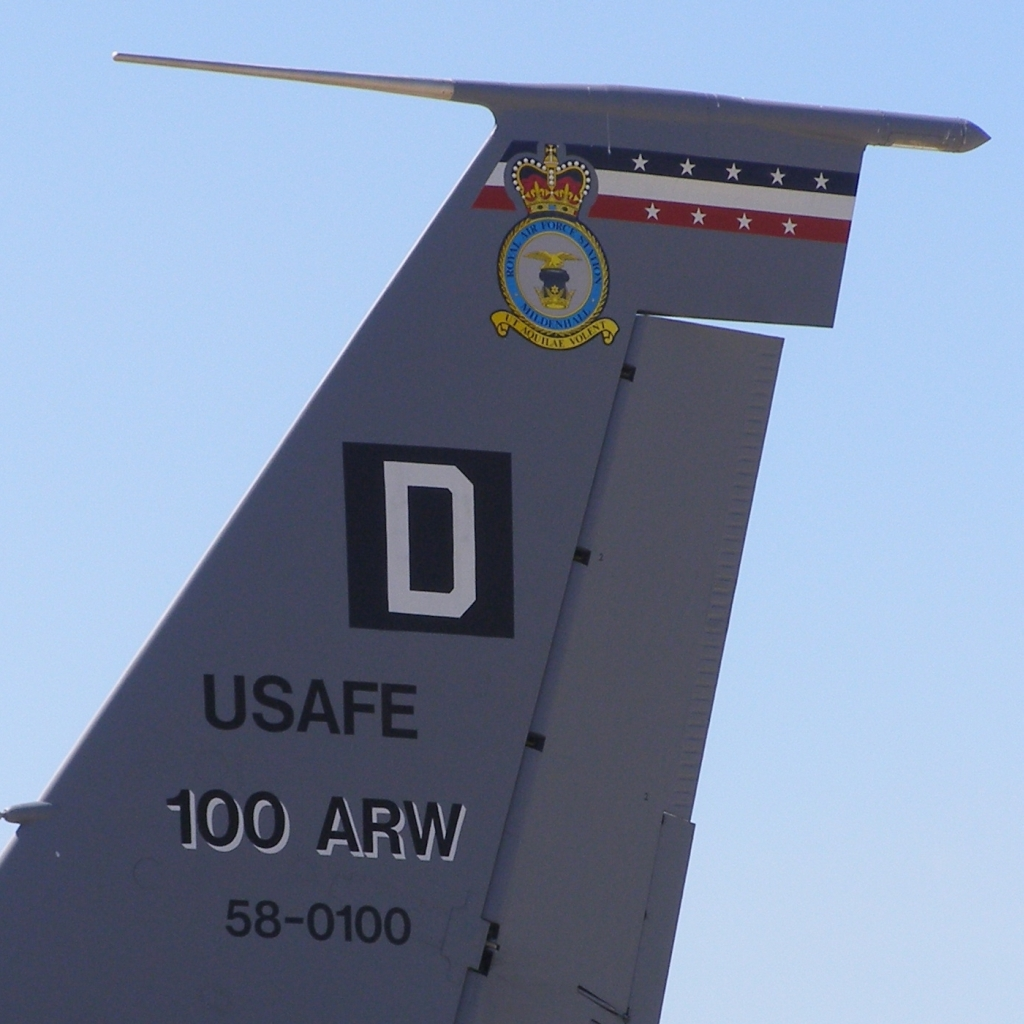
Tail of a 100th Air Refueling Wing tanker displaying Square D in 2006

Groups were identified by a letter superimposed on the symbol. At first letters were yellow in color, but after only a few had been so painted, the color was changed in July 1943 to insignia blue for easier reading. On unpainted aircraft the colors were reversed, with a white letter superimposed on a black symbol. Bombers also carried the symbol on the upper surface of the aircraft's right wingtip. Although issued group and squadron codes by the Eighth Air Force, the 93rd Combat Bomb Wing of the 3rd Bomb Division displayed neither until after the end of hostilities in Europe (noted in the table below with an asterisk). The 385th Bomb Group was shifted to the 93rd CBW in October 1944 after the wing converted from B-24 to B-17 aircraft, and it removed its fuselage and tail codes in accordance with wing policy.

=== 8AF bombardment group letter identifiers ===
1st Air Division ("Triangle")
91 BG - A	92 BG - B	303 BG - C	305 BG - G
306 BG - H	351 BG - J	379 BG - K	381 BG - L
384 BG - P	401 BG - S	457 BG - U	398 BG - W

2d Air Division ("Circle")
44 BG - A	93 BG - B	389 BG - C	392 BG - D
445 BG - F	446 BG - H	448 BG - I	453 BG - J
458 BG - K	466 BG - L	467 BG - P	492 BG - U
489 BG - W (wings)	491 BG - Z (wings)		

3d Air Division ("Square")
94 BG - A	95 BG - B	96 BG - C	100 BG - D
385 BG - G	388 BG - H	390 BG - J	447th BG - K
452 BG - L	34 BG† - S	486 BG† - O	486 BG‡ - W
487 BG - P	490 BG† - T	493 BG† - X	

† Markings as B-24 groups only
‡ B-17 markings

The 100th BG's Square D is still in use in the USAF by its successor unit, the 100th Air Refueling Wing.

=== Color identifiers ===
These markings were effective within a mile of the viewer, but as the numbers of groups increased from sixteen to forty, assembly difficulties increased. The USAAF decided to discontinue further camouflage painting of its aircraft in late 1943 and these began to reach Groups in February, 1944.

The 2nd Bomb Division devised a system for its B-24s whereby the entire tail fin was painted in a color (each of its five combat wings was assigned a color) and a black or white band placed across the fin either vertically, horizontally, or diagonally to identify the group within that wing. The 93rd CBW of the 3rd Air Division, which operated B-24s from May to September 1944, also adopted a color system in June.

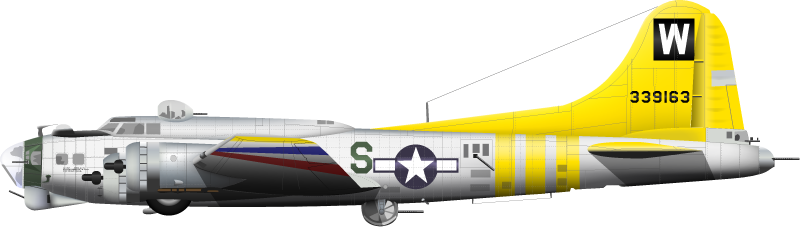
Non-camouflaged 486th Bomb Group B-17G with 4th Combat Bomb Wing, 3rd Air Division color marking scheme

The first color markings for B-17s appeared in July 1944 when the 1st Combat Bomb Wing (91st, 381st, and 398th Bomb Groups) painted the empennage of their airplanes bright red. The remainder of the 1st Air Division began using color schemes in September, but each combat wing adopted a different method, depicted in the link below under "External links".

The 3rd Air Division, once converted to an all-B-17 command, followed suit in the winter of 1944-1945, employing elaborate schemes which included colored chevrons and bands on the aircraft wings that required months of labor to convert all its aircraft. Those schemes are depicted in the B-17 link below.

== Fifteenth Air Force tail markings ==
The Fifteenth Air Force had four groups of B-17's and eleven of B-24's when it first marked its aircraft for unit identification.

=== B-17 markings ===
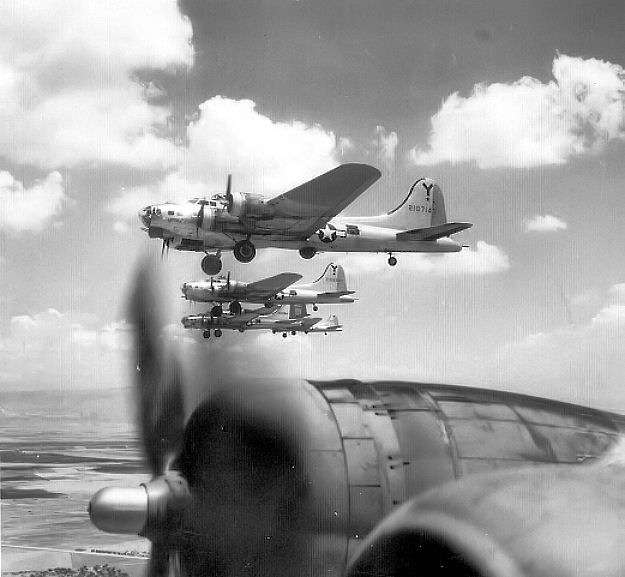
B-17s of the 483d Bombardment Group in formation during a combat mission—note the "Y" tail code above five-pointed star

The B-17's of the 5th Bomb Wing used a simple symbol system on their tail fins, adopted in the fall of 1943 before becoming part of the Fifteenth Air Force (triangle for 97th BG, square 301st BG, diamond 99th BG, and circle 2nd BG). When two additional groups joined the wing in April 1944, the wing then identified its groups by a letter Y on the uppermost area of the tail fin, superimposed on the symbol previously used (in a manner similar to the system used by the Eighth) with the new 463rd BG using a cone-shaped device and the 483rd BG a five-pointed star that was displayed below the Y instead of underlying it.

=== First B-24 scheme ===
The more numerous B-24 groups used a standardized scheme for its four bomb wings. On outer tail fins, above and below the aircraft serial, two white circles were painted. In the upper circle was painted a geometric symbol in black denoting the wing, with a triangle for the 47th Bomb Wing, a square for the 55th, a diamond for the 304th, and a circle for the 49th. In practice that of the 49th, because of the type of stencil used, resembled the concentric ring bull's-eye of a target. The lower circle contained one of the numerals 1 through 4, painted in black, denoting the group.

15AF B-24 group numeral identifiers:

47th Bomb Wing (triangle):

98th BG - 1, 376th BG - 2, 449th BG - 3, 450th BG - 4

49th Bomb Wing (circle/bulls-eye):

451st BG - 1, 461st BG (second wing assignment, 1944-45) - 2

55th Bomb Wing (square):

460th BG - 1, 461st BG (first wing assignment, 1944) - 2

304th Bomb Wing (diamond):

454th BG - 1, 455th BG - 2, 456th BG - 3, 459th BG - 4

=== Second B-24 scheme ===
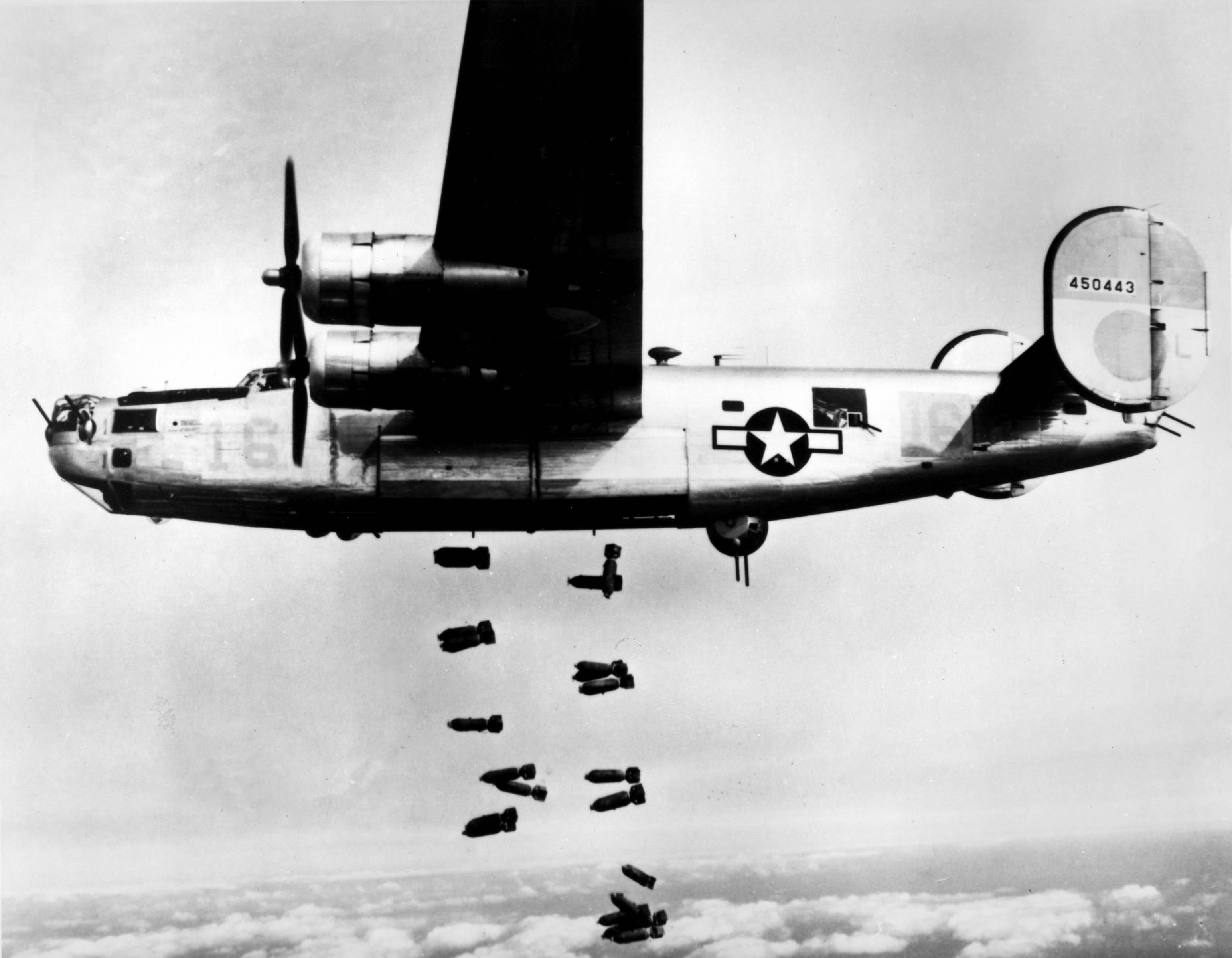
451st Bomb Group B-24 # 44-50443 displaying 49th bomb wing markings over Germany, March 19, 1945. The upper tail surface and circle were red in color.

In June, 1944, the Fifteenth Air Force adopted a color-symbol scheme to identify its groups and wings. The 5th Bomb Wing painted the elevators and rudders of its B-17s various colors but otherwise maintained its marking scheme. The B-24 wings adopted a method by which color and symbol placement would identify its groups:

47th Bomb Wing
Diagonally divided tail fins and painted the lower half in yellow and/or black, with the 98th BG using horizontal stripes, the 376th BG in black-only, the 449th BG in half-yellow half-black, and the 450th BG in vertical stripes. The former triangle-circle symbol was retained in the upper half. Late in the war the upper rear stabilizer was painted black with a longitudinal yellow band in the center except for the elevators.

49th Bomb Wing
Upper half of the fin painted red, and a red symbol in the lower half; used the same scheme on the upper rear stabilizer with the red on the right side and the symbol on the left. 451st BG: circle; 461st BG: horizontal bar; 484th BG: bow-tie.

55th Bomb Wing
Large black square in upper half of the fin, lower half painted black with a yellow symbol superimposed. 460th BG: ring; 464th BG: vertical bar; 465th BG: horizontal stripe; 485th BG: a saltire. The rear stabilizer generally displayed only the black square outlined in yellow until late in the war, when the entire surface was painted yellow except for the elevators.

304th Bomb Wing
Large black diamond in the upper half; lower half painted to group color. The rear stabilizer was painted the group color on the left half and had a diamond on the right. 454th BG: white; 455th BG: yellow; 456th BG: red; 459th BG: black-and-yellow checkerboard.

== Twentieth Air Force tail markings ==
For a period of six months the Twentieth Air Force operated two bomber commands, each with a different method of identifying its B-29 Superfortress groups. From April 1945 forward all twenty groups, organized into five bomb wings, were assigned to XXI Bomber Command, which standardized its markings.

=== XX Bomber Command ===
The 58th Bomb Wing had been the first to deploy, beginning combat in June 1944 with only a handful of B-29's painted in the standard olive drab camouflage. Each of its four groups employed a different method while based in the China Burma India Theater as part of XX Bomber Command. The 40th BG painted four horizontal stripes across the upper tail fin with the letter identification of the airplane below it. The 444th BG numbered its aircraft and placed it within a large blue diamond outlined in yellow on the tail fin. The 462nd BG painted its rudders but otherwise did not designate the group. The 468th painted two diagonal stripes on the rudders of its aircraft. When the wing and its groups transferred to Tinian in April 1945 the 58th Wing changed to a letter-symbol system.

=== XXI Bomber Command ===
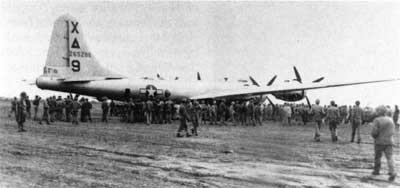
B-29 Dinah Might of the 9th BG on March 4, 1945, showing 313th Bomb Wing markings then in use (occasion: first B-29 to land on Iwo Jima.) Note aircraft's call sign "X Triangle 9".

The 73rd Bomb Wing began combat in October 1944 from Isley Field, Saipan, and marked its aircraft similarly to that of the Fifteenth Air Force 55th CBW. A letter denoting the group was painted on the upper third of the tail fin, with a square symbol in the center, and an aircraft identifier, known as the "victor number," in the lower third. Aircraft commonly used their tail identifiers as radio voice calls (call signs), i.e. Lucky Irish (serial 42-24622) of the 870th Bomb Squadron, 497th Bomb Group (lost November 24, 1944, over Tokyo) had the voice call "A Square 26".

The 313th Bomb Wing moved to North Field (Tinian), in January 1945. Its aircraft used a system identical to that of the 73rd Wing, with its symbol a triangle.

The 314th Bomb Wing was based at North Field, Guam (now Andersen Air Force Base) beginning in January 1945, with some of its groups beginning combat operations in February. In order to quickly mark its increasing numbers of aircraft, the 314th Wing painted 96-inch black boxes on the tail fins and stenciled the group identifier, either M, O, P or K in BMF 72-inch block letters. This was later infilled with a bright orange/yellow in mid summer 1945.

The 58th Bomb Wing was relocated from India to West Field, Tinian (now Tinian International Airport), in April 1945 and the 315th Wing began arriving at Northwest Field, Guam, in May. The earlier system of marking aircraft was discarded in April by both the 73rd and 313th Wings. The 73rd Wing dropped all use of symbols and marked its aircraft with the group letter only, painted in 126-inch-high (3,200 mm) black lettering. Except for the 314th Wing, which maintained its markings throughout the war, the remaining wings of the XXI Bomber Command used 126-inch-diameter (3,200 mm) symbols in black to outline 63-inch-high (1,600 mm) group letters. The symbol outline of the 313th Wing was a circle, that of the 58th Wing a triangle, and that of the 315th Wing a diamond.

20AF group letter identifiers:

58th Bomb Wing (triangle outline symbol):

40th BG - S, 444th BG - N, 462nd BG - U, 468th BG - I

73rd Bomb Wing (square outline symbol, 10.5-foot letters):

497th BG - A, 498th BG - T, 499th BG - V, 500th BG - Z

313th Bomb Wing (circle outline symbol):

6th BG - R, 9th BG - X, 504th BG - E, 505th BG (January to March) - K, (April to September) - W

314th Bomb Wing (solid black square):

19 BG	29th BG	39th BG	330th BG
M	O	P	K

315th Bomb Wing (diamond outline):

16th BG - B, 331st BG - L, 501st BG - Y, 502nd BG - H

=== 509th Composite Group ===
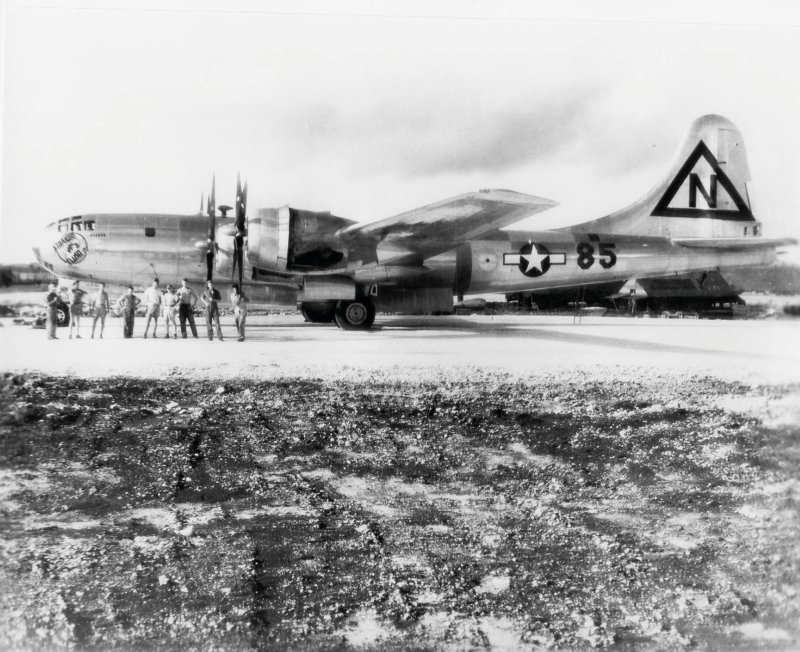
509th's Straight Flush in livery of 444th BG.

The 509th Composite Group, sent to Tinian to drop the atomic bomb, was assigned to the 313th Bomb Wing. Consisting of a single squadron, its tail marking was a circle outline around an arrowhead pointing forward, but while flying combat missions its fifteen B-29s used the tail markings of other groups and wings as a security measure. Richard H. Campbell, in The Silverplate Bombers, reports that XXI Bomber Command feared that Japanese survivors on Tinian were observing 509th operations, which had been quite extensive before August 1, and reporting them by clandestine radio to Tokyo.

The 509th repainted the tail identifier with those of four XXI Bomber Command groups already in combat, and altered victor numbers to avoid misidentification with actual aircraft already bearing the numbers. New victor numbers 82, 89, 90, and 91, carried the markings of the 6th Bomb Group (Circle R); victors 71, 72, 73, and 84 those of the 497th Bomb Group (large "A"); victors 77, 85, 86, and 88 those of the 444th Bomb Group (triangle N); and victors 83, 94, and 95 those of the 39th Bomb Group (square P).

== Other air forces in the Pacific ==
Tail markings were used on all combat types: bombers, fighters, even some combat cargo and air commando observation planes. The level of command establishing markings was often at lower echelons yet patterns existed and repetitions avoided.

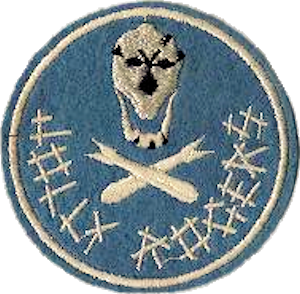
The 90th Bomb Group's "Jolly Roger"-inspired unit insignia

The four heavy bomber groups of the Fifth Air Force employed three different methods. The original two groups, the 43d and 90th Bombardment Groups, bore the red-white-and-blue-striped rudder markings of the pre-war Air Corps, but the other two groups, appearing later, did not. The 43d and 90th were differentiated from each other by their squadron markings; the 43d placed large squadron insignia on the fins, while the 90th painted the tail fins in squadron colors and superimposed a 72-inch Jolly Roger symbol, emblematic of the group's nickname, on the painted fin. The 380th Bombardment Group painted one quarter of its tail fins black for identification, with each squadron having a different quadrant. The 22d Bombardment Group, which converted from B-25 medium bombers in 1944, placed a 40-inch-wide (1,000 mm) rectangle horizontally bisecting the tail fin, with each squadron having a different color.

All three groups of the Seventh Air Force used black symbols or stripes in various configurations, without any pattern. Identification of groups could be made only by memorization of symbols assigned to squadrons and knowledge of to what groups those squadrons were assigned.

The two groups of the Thirteenth Air Force used completely different methods. The 5th Bombardment Group used the same black geometric symbols as the Twentieth Air Force, a different symbol for each squadron, placed in the upper third of the tail fin. The 307th Bombardment Group created a group symbol, a large blue circle containing a stylized "LR" (for "Long Rangers", the group nickname) in gold, and placed it on all their aircraft tails. The upper tips of the fins were painted different colors to identify its squadrons.

The two air forces in Asia, the Tenth Air Force and Fourteenth Air Force, each had only a single bomb group. The Tenth's 7th Bombardment Group used a checkerboard pattern in either black-and-white or black-and-yellow on the rudder or part of the tail fin to identify its squadrons. The 308th Bombardment Group of the Fourteenth Air Force used colored or striped rudders.

The Air Commando Groups used punctuation marks (!,?) In the CBI while in the FEAF the patterns were consistent with the Fifth Air Force style.

Fighter groups, especially of the VII FC, used colored tails with geometric patterns. Others used colored nose and tail combinations.

== See also ==
- List of USAAF squadron codes

== Sources ==
- Birdsall, Steve, Log of the Liberators: An Illustrated History of the B-24, (1973) ISBN 0-385-03870-4
- Bowman, Martin W., The USAAF Handbook 1939-1945 (1997), p. 66. ISBN 0-8117-1822-0
- Freeman, Roger A., The Mighty Eighth: A History of the Units, Men and Machines of the US 8th Air Force (1970, 1993), pp. 285–286. ISBN 0-87938-638-X
- Campbell, Richard H., The Silverplate Bombers: A History and Registry of the Enola Gay and Other B-29s Configured to Carry Atomic Bombs (2005), p. 19. ISBN 0-7864-2139-8
