= Up An' Atom =

Nuclear-configured B-29 Superfortress

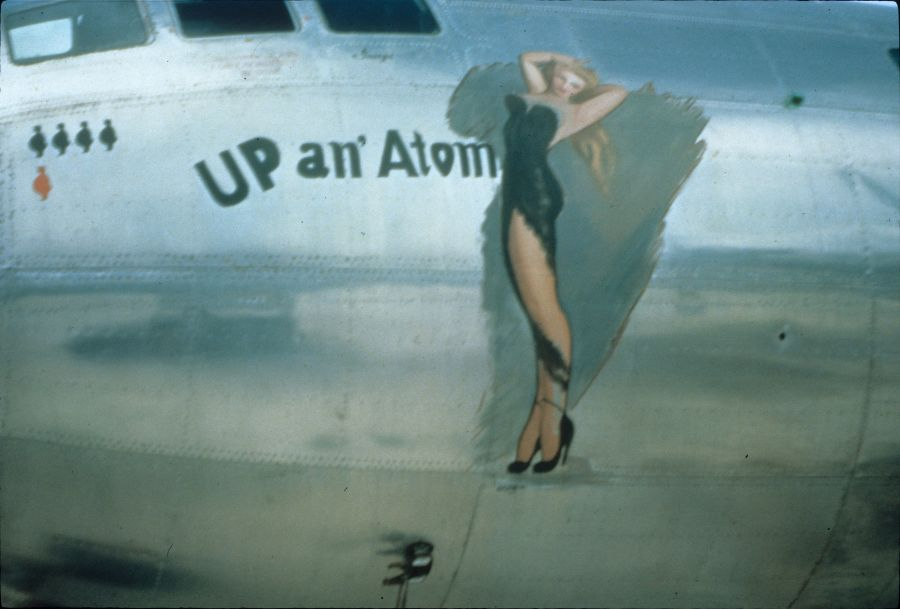
Nose art of Up an' Atom

Up An' Atom was the name of a B-29 Superfortress (B-29-36-MO 44-27304, Victor number 88) configured during World War II in the Silverplate project to carry an atomic bomb.

== History ==
Assigned to the 393d Bomb Squadron, 509th Composite Group, it was built at the Glenn L. Martin Aircraft Plant at Omaha, Nebraska, accepted by the Army Air Forces on April 3, 1945, and flown to Wendover Army Air Field, Utah, by its assigned crew B-10 (Capt. George W. Marquardt, Aircraft Commander). It departed Wendover for North Field, Tinian on June 11 and arrived on June 17.

It was originally assigned the Victor (unit-assigned identification number) number 8 but on August 1 was given the triangle N tail markings of the 444th Bomb Group as a security measure and had its Victor changed to 88 to avoid misidentification with actual 444th BG aircraft. It was named and had its nose art painted after the Nagasaki mission. The name is a word play on the colloquial idiom "Up and at 'em", meaning "There is a lot of work to be done," and referencing the unit's atomic mission.

While at Tinian, Marquadt and crew B-10 flew Up An' Atom on eight training and practice bombing missions and pumpkin bomb missions against industrial targets in Taira and Hamamatsu, Japan. Capt. Bob Lewis's crew B-9 flew it on a pumpkin bomb mission to Tokushima subsequent to the Hiroshima mission, and Lt.Col. James Hopkins and crew C-14 used it to attack Nagoya with a pumpkin bomb.

Up An' Atom returned to the United States with the 509th CG in November 1945 to Roswell Army Airfield. From April to August 1946 it was assigned to the Operation Crossroads task force. In August 1949 it became part of the 97th Bomb Group at Biggs Air Force Base, Texas, and was re-configured as a TB-29 trainer in April 1950 by the Oklahoma City Air Materiel Area at Tinker Air Force Base.

Its subsequent assignments were to:

- 112th Radar Calibration Squadron, Hamilton Air Force Base, California (October 1951),
- 4th Radar Calibration Squadron, Hamilton AFB (February 1953),
- 4754th Radar Evaluation Flight, Hamilton AFB (March 1954),
- Mobile Air Materiel Area, Nashville, Tennessee (March 1955)
- 17th Tow Target Squadron, Vincent Air Force Base, Arizona (May 1955).

Up An' Atom was dropped from the Air Force inventory in November 1956. It was transferred to the U.S. Navy and used as a target at the Naval Ordnance Test Station at China Lake, California.

== Sources ==
- Campbell, Richard H., The Silverplate Bombers: A History and Registry of the Enola Gay and Other B-29s Configured to Carry Atomic Bombs (2005), ISBN 0-7864-2139-8
