= Frederick C. Bock =

American bomber pilot (1918–2000)

Doctor Frederick C. Bock
- Born: Frederick Carl Bock Jr. 18 January 1918; Greenville, Michigan
- Died: 25 August 2000 (aged 82); Scottsdale, Arizona
- Spouse: Helen Lossman Bock
- Military career
- Allegiance: United States of America
- Branch: Army Air Force
- Rank: Major
- Unit: 509th Composite Group
- Conflicts: Second World War
- Awards: Distinguished Flying Cross, Air Medal
- Other work: Research Scientist

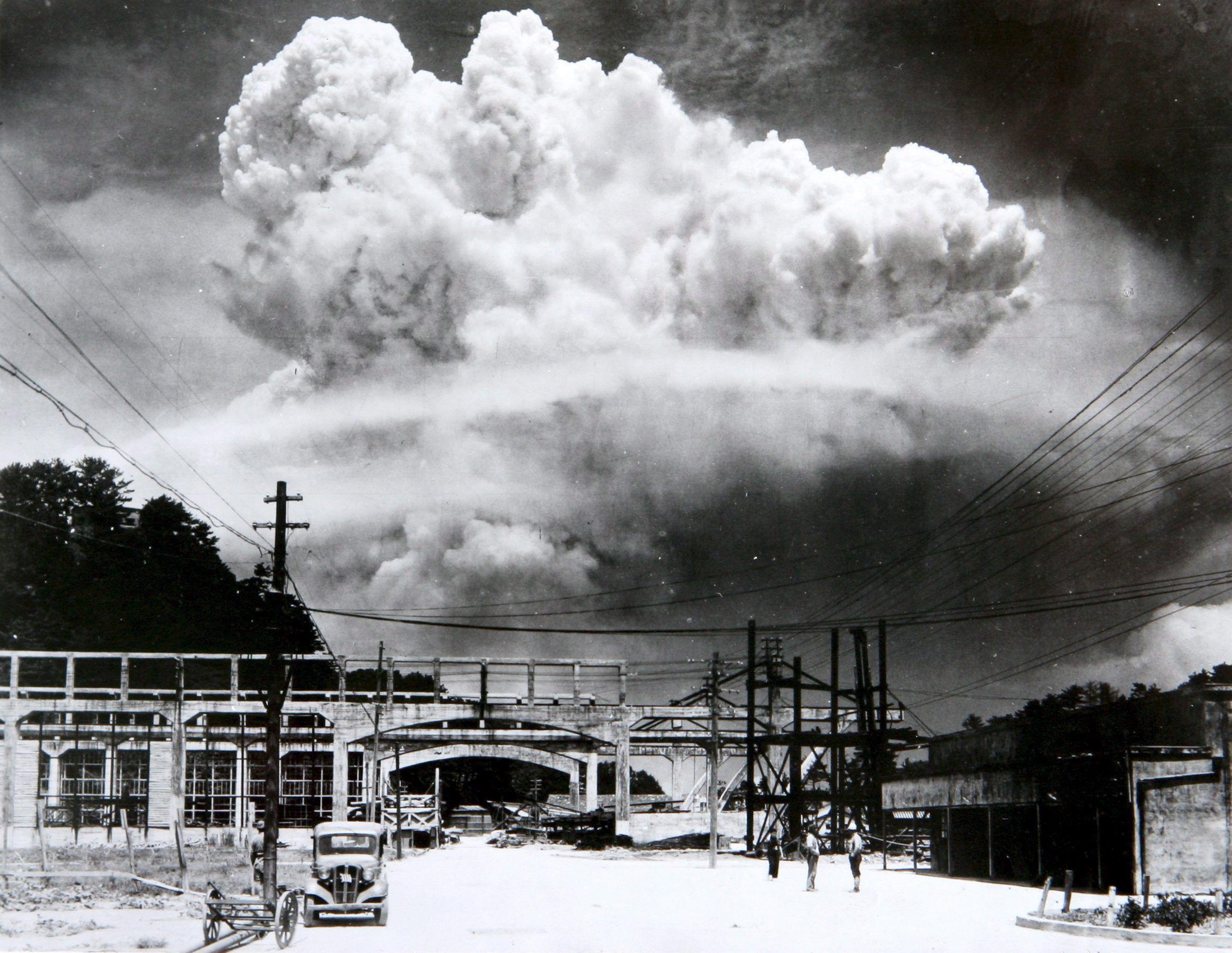
Cloud over Nagasaki following the atomic blast

Frederick Carl Bock Jr (18 January 1918 – 25 August 2000) was an American bomber pilot during World War II who took part in the atomic bombing of Nagasaki in 1945.

Bock attended the University of Chicago and went on to enroll in a graduate course in philosophy.

== World War II ==
Upon the entry of the United States into World War II, Bock enlisted in the Army Air Forces, becoming a pilot. Bock flew missions from India to China over the Himalayas, a route known as the Hump. He also participated in air raids on Japan flown from China.

=== Nagasaki atomic bomb raid ===
On the Nagasaki Raid, Bock flew the B-29 bomber The Great Artiste, which was used for scientific measurements and photography of the effects caused by the nuclear weapon.

The bomber that actually dropped Fat Man was called Bockscar, an aircraft named for and usually flown by Bock. The staff was swapped just before the raid, and Major Charles Sweeney piloted Bockscar, which flew with The Great Artiste and another aircraft.

William L. Laurence, a science writer with the New York Times, was a civilian observer aboard The Great Artiste. His account of the mission was awarded the 1946 Pulitzer Prize. In his book, Dawn Over Zero (Knopf 1946), Laurence describes the scene aboard the B-29:

I watched Capt. Frederick C. Bock, the pilot of our ship, went through the intricate motions of lifting a B-29 off the ground and marveled at the quiet efficiency of this Michigan boy who had majored in philosophy at Chicago University... I talked to him on the ground, and I was amazed at the transformation that had taken place. Man and machine had become one, a modern centaur.

— William L. Laurence, Dawn Over Zero (1946)

Bock rose to the rank of major and received the Distinguished Flying Cross and the Air Medal.

== Post-war career ==
After the war, Bock returned to Chicago, where he earned his PhD in zoology, with a specialisation in mathematical statistics and genetics. Working in Chicago-based research laboratories, Dr. Bock created algorithms for solving complex problems. At Baxter Travenol Laboratories, he devised a mathematical model for peritoneal dialysis. Dr. Bock retired from Baxter Travenol in 1986.

A native of Greenville, Michigan, Bock died at his Arizona home in 2000 of cancer.
