= Charles Sweeney =

United States Air Force general (1919–2004)

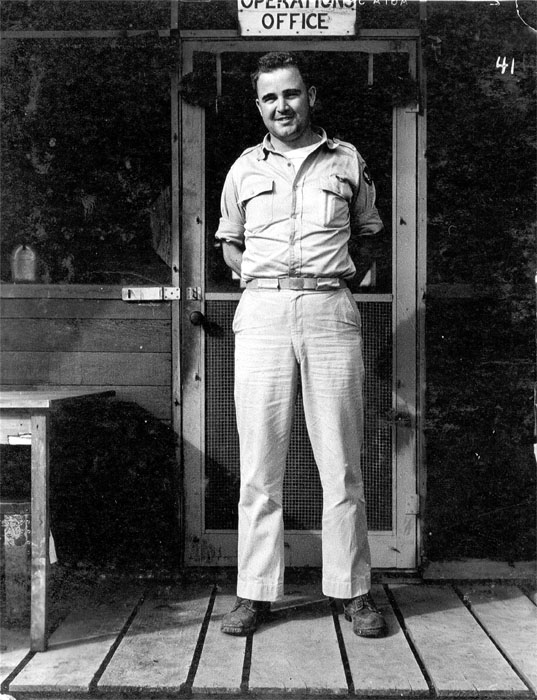
- USAF picture
- Born: Charles William Sweeney; 27 December 1919; Lowell, Massachusetts
- Died: 16 July 2004 (aged 84); Boston, Massachusetts
- Burial place: Massachusetts National Cemetery
- Military career
- Allegiance: United States
- Branch: United States Army Air Corps; United States Army Air Forces; United States Air Force; Massachusetts Air National Guard
- Service years: 1941–1979
- Rank: Major General
- Units: 509th Composite Group
- Commands: 393rd Bombardment Squadron; 102nd Tactical Fighter Wing
- Conflicts: World War II: Atomic Bombing of Hiroshima; Atomic Bombing of Nagasaki
- Awards: Silver Star; Air Medal

Charles William Sweeney (27 December 1919 – 16 July 2004) was an officer in the United States Army Air Forces during World War II and the pilot who flew Bockscar carrying the Fat Man atomic bomb to the Japanese city of Nagasaki on 9 August 1945. Separating from active duty at the end of World War II, he later became an officer in the Massachusetts Air National Guard as the Army Air Forces transitioned to an independent United States Air Force, eventually rising to the rank of major general.

== Early life and education ==
Charles Sweeney was an Irish-American born in 1919, the son of a plumber, in Lowell, Massachusetts at a time when the textile mill city went through a massive transformation; After the 1922 New England Textile Strike, it became a "depressed industrial desert" in the 1930s. Sweeney attended North Quincy High School and graduated in 1937. Thereafter, he attended evening classes at Boston University and Purdue University.

== Military career ==
In April 1941, Sweeney joined the Army Air Corps and became a pilot by December 1941. He was moved to Jefferson Proving Grounds in Indiana. From 1943-1944, he served as a test pilot on the newly built Eglin Field, in Florida.

In 1944, now a major, he became a B-29 pilot instructor at Grand Island, Nebraska and later that year in Wendover Army Airfield, Utah.

=== 509th Composite Group ===
At Wendover Field Sweeney became an instructor in the atomic missions training project, Project Alberta. Selected to be part of the 509th Composite Group commanded by Colonel Paul Tibbets, he was named commander of the 320th Troop Carrier Squadron on 6 January 1945. Initially his squadron used C-47 Skytrain and C-46 Commando transports on hand to conduct the top secret operations to supply the 509th, but in April 1945 it acquired five C-54 Skymasters, which had the range to deliver personnel and materiel to the western Pacific area.

On 4 May 1945, Sweeney became commander of the 393d Bombardment Squadron, Heavy, the combat element of the 509th, in charge of 15 Silverplate B-29s and their flight and ground crews, 535 men in all. In June and July Sweeney moved his unit to North Field on the island of Tinian in the Marianas.

In addition to supervising the intensive training of his flight crews during July 1945, Sweeney was slated to command the second atomic bomb mission. He trained with the crew of Captain (Charles D.) Don Albury aboard their B-29 The Great Artiste, and was aircraft commander on the training mission of 11 July. He and the crew flew five of the nine rehearsal test drops of inert Little Boy and Fat Man bomb assemblies in preparation for the missions.

On 6 August 1945, Sweeney and Albury piloted The Great Artiste as the instrumentation and observation support aircraft for the atomic bomb attack on Hiroshima.

=== Bombing of Nagasaki ===
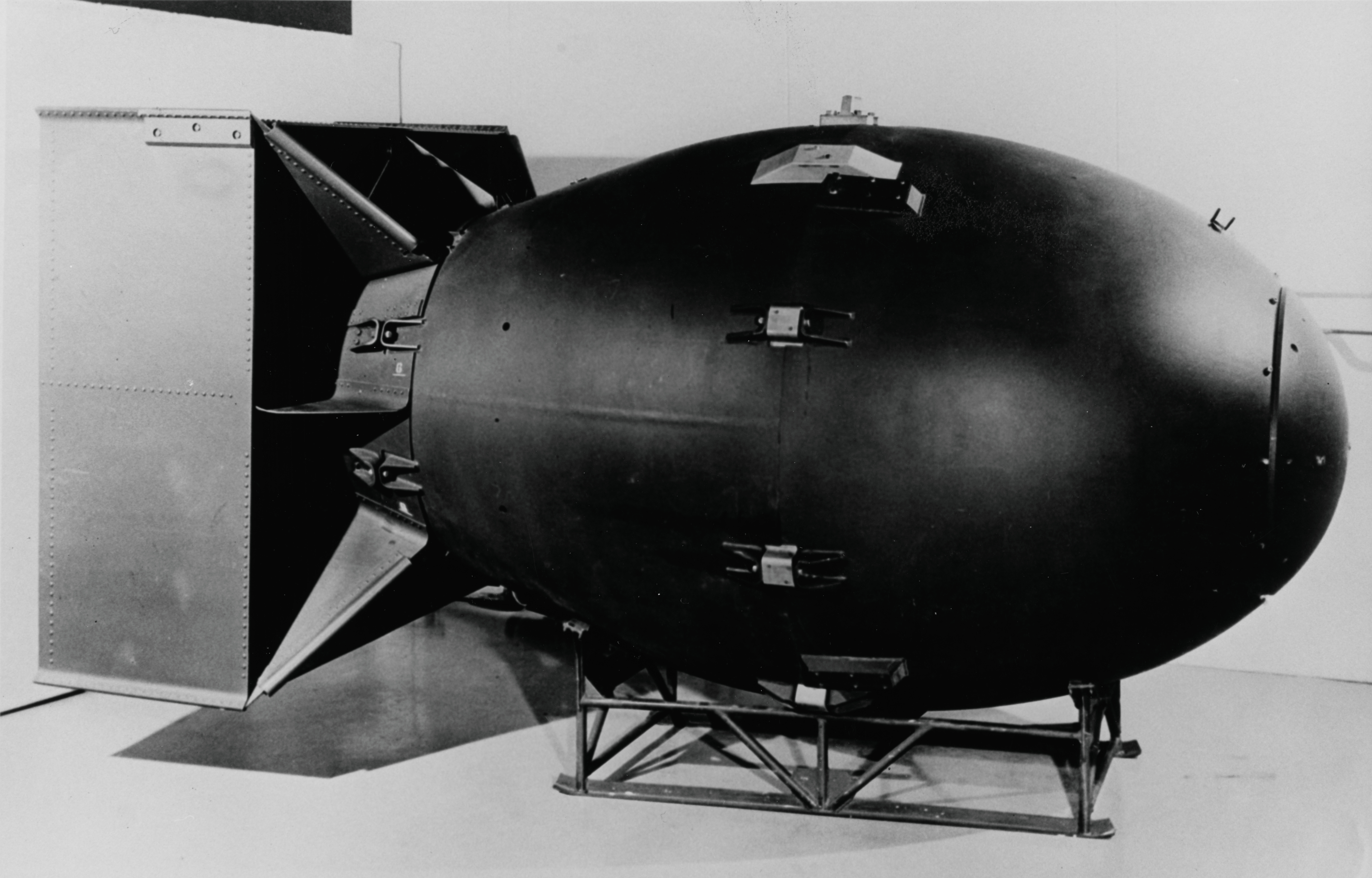
A replica of the Fat Man bomb

On 9 August 1945, Major Sweeney commanded Bockscar, which carried the atomic bomb Fat Man from the island of Tinian to Nagasaki. In addition to Bockscar, the mission included two observation and instrumentation support B-29s, The Great Artiste and The Big Stink, which would rendezvous with Bockscar over Yakushima Island. At the mission pre-briefing, the three planes were ordered to make their rendezvous over Yakushima at 30,000 feet (9,100 m) due to weather conditions over Iwo Jima (the Hiroshima mission rendezvous). That same morning, on the day of the mission, the ground crew notified Sweeney that a faulty fuel transfer pump made it impossible to utilize some 625 US gal (2,370 litres) of fuel in the tail, but Sweeney, as aircraft commander, elected to proceed with the mission.

Before takeoff, Tibbets warned Sweeney that he had lost at least 45 minutes of flying time because of the fuel pump problem, and to take no more than fifteen minutes at the rendezvous before proceeding directly to the primary target.

After takeoff from Tinian, Bockscar reached its rendezvous point and after circling for an extended period, found The Great Artiste, but not The Big Stink. Climbing to 30,000 feet, the assigned rendezvous altitude, both aircraft slowly circled Yakushima Island. Though Sweeney had been ordered not to wait at the rendezvous for the other aircraft longer than fifteen minutes before proceeding to the primary target, Sweeney continued to wait for The Big Stink, perhaps at the urging of Commander Frederick Ashworth, the plane's weaponeer. After exceeding the original rendezvous time limit by a half-hour, Bockscar, accompanied by The Great Artiste, proceeded to the primary target, Kokura. No fewer than three bomb runs were made, but the delay at the rendezvous had resulted in 7/10ths cloud cover over the primary target, and the bombardier was unable to drop. By the time of the third bomb run, Japanese antiaircraft fire was getting close, and Japanese fighter planes could be seen climbing to intercept Bockscar.

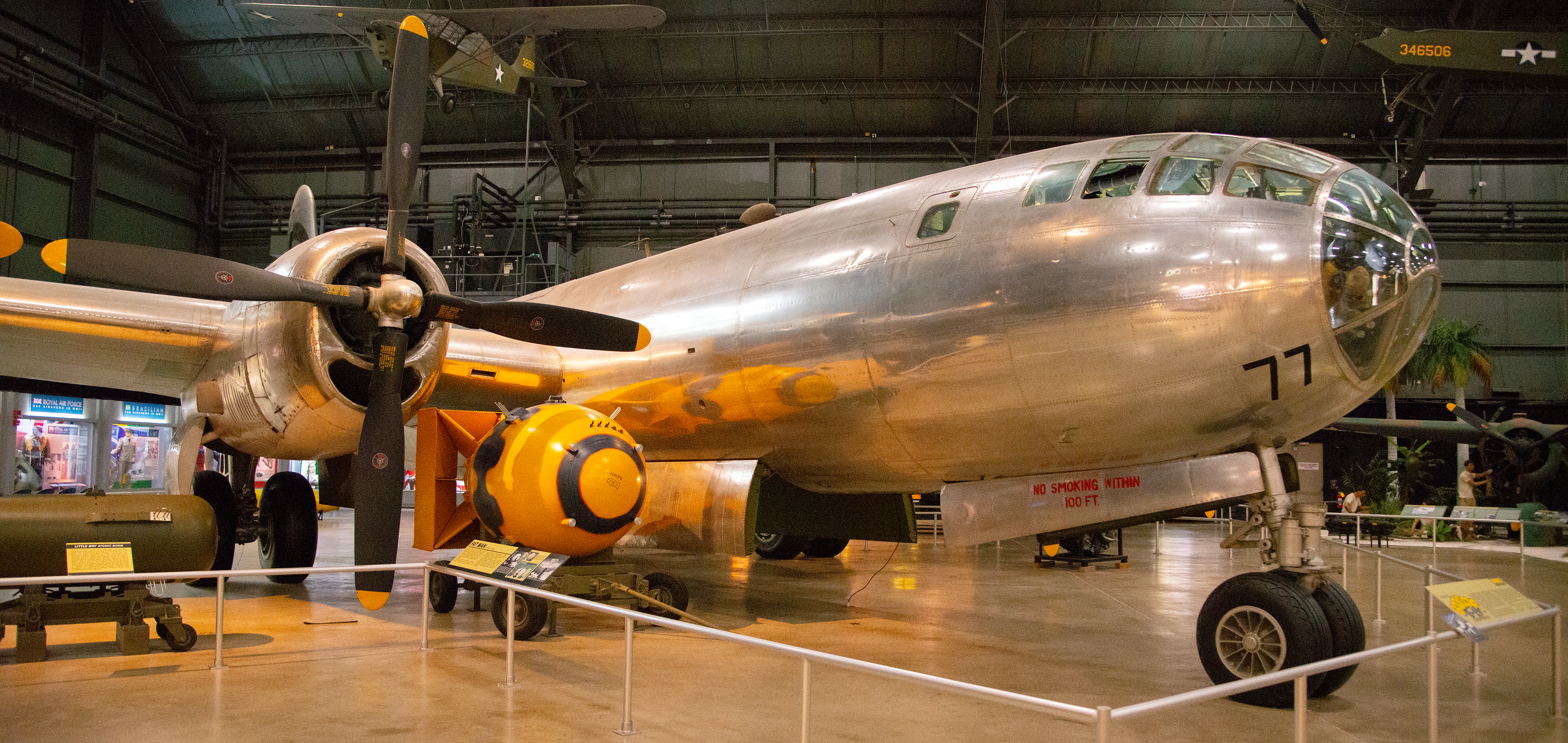
The Bockscar B-29 and a post war Mk III nuclear weapon painted to resemble the Fat Man bomb, at the National Museum of the United States Air Force, Dayton, Ohio

Poor bombing visibility and an increasingly critical fuel shortage eventually forced Bockscar to divert from Kokura and attack the secondary target, Nagasaki. As they approached Nagasaki, the heart of the city's downtown was covered by dense cloud, and Sweeney and Ashworth, initially decided to bomb Nagasaki using radar. However, a small opening in the clouds allowed Bockscar's bombardier to verify the target as Nagasaki. The crew had been ordered to drop the bomb visually if possible; Sweeney decided to proceed with a visual bomb run. Bockscar then dropped Fat Man, with a blast yield equivalent to 21 kilotons of TNT. It exploded 43 seconds later at 1,539 feet (469 meters) above the ground, at least 1.6 miles (2.5 kilometers) northwest of the planned aim point. The failure to drop Fat Man at the precise bomb aim point caused the atomic blast to be confined to the Urakami Valley. As a consequence, a major portion of the city was protected by the intervening hills, and around 30% of Nagasaki was destroyed. The bombing also severed the Mitsubishi arms production extensively and killed an estimated 35,000–40,000 people outright, including 23,200–28,200 Japanese industrial workers, 2,000 Korean slave laborers, and 150 Japanese soldiers.

Low on fuel, Bockscar barely made it to the runway on Okinawa. With only enough fuel for one landing attempt, Sweeney brought Bockscar in fast and hard, ordering every available distress flare on board to be fired as he did so. The number two engine died from fuel starvation as Bockscar began its final approach. Touching the runway hard, the heavy B-29 slewed left and towards a row of parked B-24 bombers before the pilots managed to regain control. With both pilots standing on the brakes, Sweeney made a swerving 90-degree turn at the end of the runway to avoid going over the cliff into the ocean. 2nd Lt. Jacob Beser recalled that at this point, two engines had died from the fuel starvation, while "the centrifugal force resulting from the turn was almost enough to put us through the side of the airplane."

After Bockscar returned to Tinian, Tibbets recorded that he was faced with the dilemma of considering “if any action should be taken against the airplane commander, Charles Sweeney, for failure to command.” After meeting on Guam with Tibbets and Sweeney, General Curtis LeMay, chief of staff for the Strategic Air Forces, confronted Sweeney, stating, "You fucked up, didn't you, Chuck?", to which Sweeney made no reply. LeMay then turned to Tibbets and told him that an investigation into Sweeney's conduct of the mission would serve no useful purpose.

In November 1945, Sweeney returned with the 509th Composite Group to Roswell Army Air Base in New Mexico to train aircrews for the atomic testing mission, Operation Crossroads, a peacetime experiment on Bikini. On June 28, 1946, he was discharged from active duty.

== Post-war activities ==
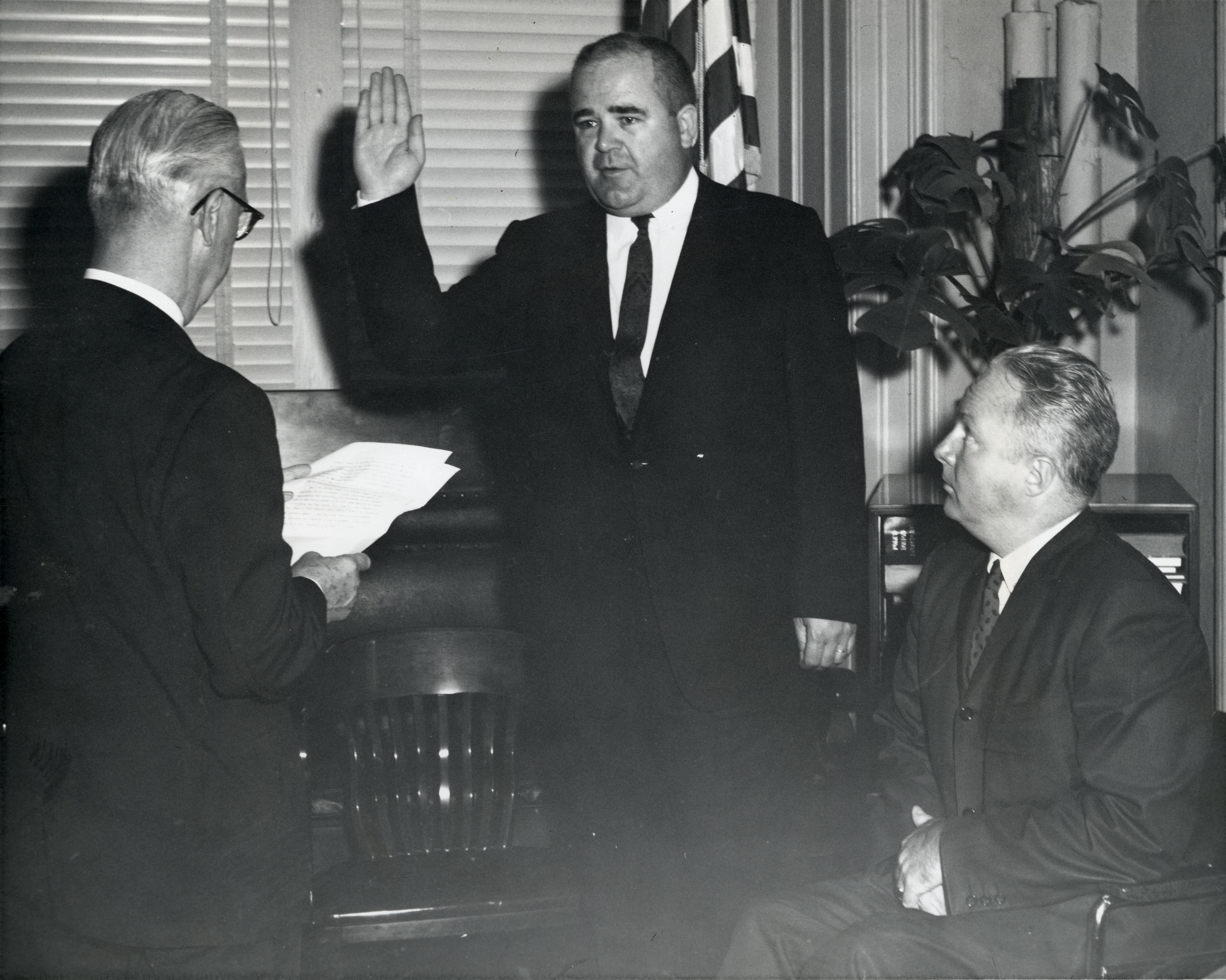
Boston City Clerk Walter J. Malloy administers the oath of office for Sweeney to serve as Boston Director of Civil Defense as Boston Mayor John F. Collins looks on

Sweeney left active duty with the rank of lieutenant colonel on 28 June 1946, but remained active with the Massachusetts Air National Guard. Later promoted to full colonel, on 21 February 1956, Sweeney was named commander of its 102nd Air Defense Wing and shortly after, on 6 April, was promoted to brigadier general. During this time, he was activated with the 102nd and served in Europe during the Berlin Crisis from October 1961 to August 1962. Sweeney was made chief of staff in October 1967.

In the 1960s, Sweeney coordinated civil defense in Boston, serving as the Boston Director of Civil Defense.

He retired in 1976 as a major general in the Air National Guard. He also appeared in the 1970s television series The World at War and was seen explaining the USAAF buildup to the mission raids.

Throughout his life Sweeney remained convinced of the appropriateness and necessity of the bombing. "I saw these beautiful young men who were being slaughtered by an evil, evil military force," he said in 1995. "There's no question in my mind that President Truman made the right decision." At the same time, he said, "As the man who commanded the last atomic mission, I pray that I retain that singular distinction."

== Later life ==
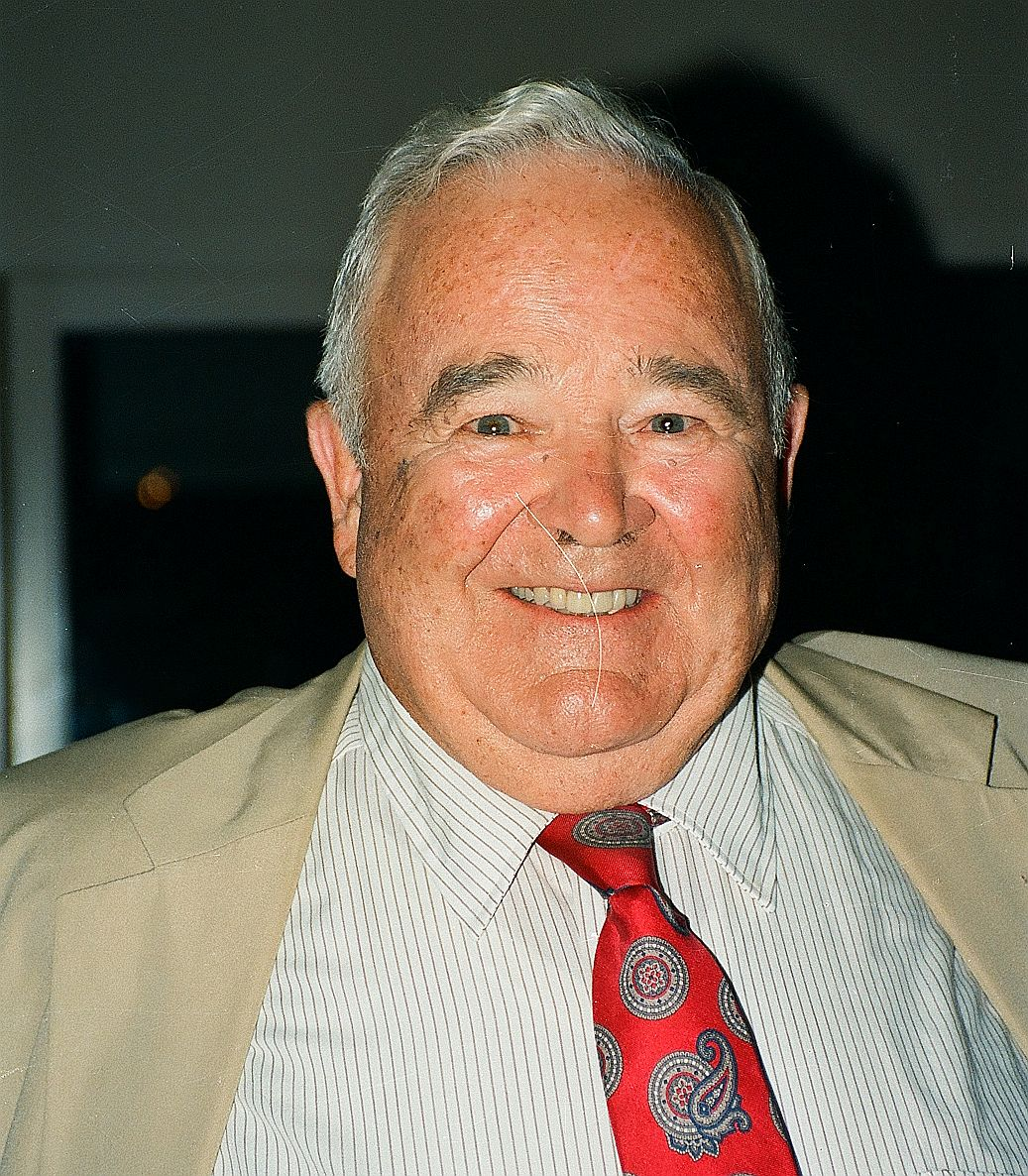
Sweeney in 1995

Near the end of his life, Sweeney wrote a controversial and factually disputed memoir of the atomic bombing and the 509th Composite Group, War's End: An Eyewitness Account of America's Last Atomic Mission. In War's End, Sweeney defended the decision to drop the atomic bomb in light of subsequent historical questioning. However, it was Sweeney's other assertions regarding the Nagasaki atomic mission, along with various anecdotes regarding the 509th and its crews that drew the most criticism. Tibbets, Major "Dutch" Van Kirk, Colonel Thomas Ferebee and others vigorously disputed Sweeney's account of events. Partly in response to War's End, Tibbets issued a revised version of his own autobiography in 1998, adding a new section on the Nagasaki attack in which he harshly criticized Sweeney's actions during the mission.

In his later years Sweeney performed in various air shows doing many maneuvers to awe crowds.

== Personal life and death ==
Sweeney was married to Dorothy W. Sweeney with whom he had 10 children. The marriage ended in divorce. He died at age 84 on 16 July 2004, at Massachusetts General Hospital in Boston.

== Awards ==

U.S. Air Force Command Pilot Badge
Silver Star		Air Medal
Air Force Outstanding Unit Award with Combat "V"	American Defense Service Medal	American Campaign Medal
Asiatic-Pacific Campaign Medal with 2 bronze campaign stars	World War II Victory Medal	Army of Occupation Medal
National Defense Service Medal with service star	Armed Forces Expeditionary Medal	Air Force Longevity Service Award
Armed Forces Reserve Medal with gold hourglass device	Small Arms Expert Marksmanship Ribbon	Massachusetts Air National Guard Service Medal

== See also ==
- Paul Tibbets, Sweeney's counterpart on the mission which dropped Little Boy on Hiroshima

== Bibliography ==
- Brooks, Lester. Behind Japan's Surrender: Secret Struggle That Ended an Empire. New York: McGraw-Hill Book Company, 1968. ISBN 0-9626-9468-1, 978-0-9626-9468-4
- Grayling, A.C. Among the Dead Cities. London: Bloomsbury, 2006. ISBN 0-7475-7671-8.
- Miller, Merle; Spitzer, Abe (1946). We Dropped The A-Bomb. New York: Thomas Y. Crowell Company.
- Olivi, Lt.Col. USAF (Ret) Fred J. Decision At Nagasaki: The Mission That Almost Failed. Privately Printed, 1999. ISBN 0-9678747-0-X.
- Sweeney, Maj.Gen. USAF (Ret) Charles, with James A. Antonucci and Marion K. Antonucci. War's End: an Eyewitness Account of America's Last Atomic Mission. New York: Avon Books, 1997. ISBN 0-380-97349-9.
- Tomatsu, Shomei. 11:02 Nagasaki. Tokyo: Shashin Dojinsha, 1966.
