= Charles Donald Albury =

United States Army Air Forces officer

- Born: October 12, 1920; Miami, Florida, U.S.
- Died: May 23, 2009 (aged 88); Orlando, Florida, U.S.
- Military career
- Allegiance: United States
- Branch: United States Army Air Forces
- Service years: 1942–1945
- Rank: Captain
- Conflicts: World War II: Atomic bombings of Hiroshima and Nagasaki
- Awards: Air Medal

Charles Donald Albury (October 12, 1920 – May 23, 2009) was an American military aviator who participated in both atomic bombings of Hiroshima and Nagasaki. He was the co-pilot of the United States Army Air Forces B-29 bomber known as the Bockscar during the mission that dropped the atomic bomb on Nagasaki on August 9, 1945. The bombing of Nagasaki killed an estimated 40,000 people instantly, and led to Japan's unconditional surrender on August 14, 1945, ending World War II.

== Early life ==
Albury was born in 1920 at his parents' home in Miami, Florida. The Miami Police Department building currently stands on the site of Albury's birthplace, as of 2009.

== World War II ==
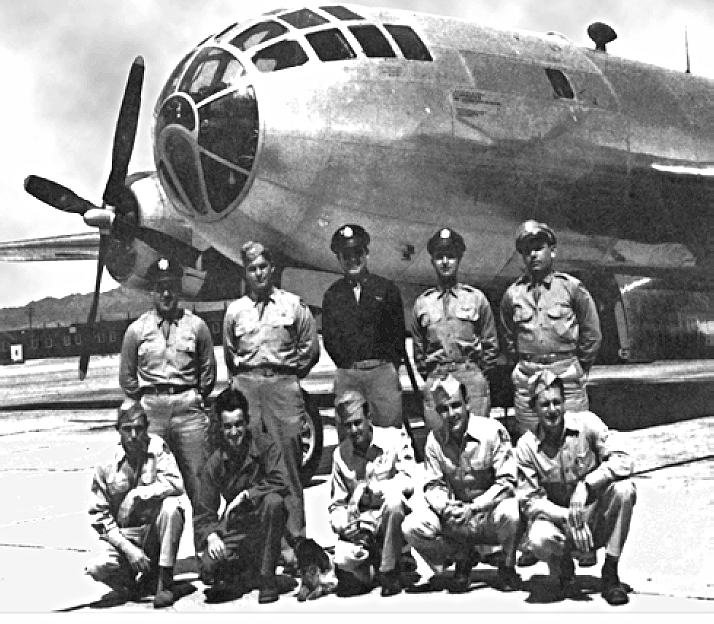
Albury (top right) with C-15 aircrew in front of Bockscar during World War II

Albury enrolled at the University of Miami's engineering school, but dropped out before he completed his bachelor's degree in order to enlist in the United States Army during World War II. He was one of three pilots assigned under the command of Captain Charles Sweeney to test the XB-29 and YB-29 delivered to Eglin Air Force Base in September 1943. Albury joined (now Major) Sweeney at Wendover Air Force Base in Utah where he and Sweeney were invited by Colonel Paul Tibbets to join what would become the nucleus of the 509th Composite Group in September 1944. (The 509th Composite Group was activated December 17, 1944.) Tibbets initially organized two air crews: one headed by himself with Robert A. Lewis as co-pilot (cockpit crew of the Enola Gay during the atomic bombing of Hiroshima), the other headed by Sweeney with Albury as the co-pilot. Lewis and Albury acted as pilots and crew commanders for their respective planes when Tibbets and/or Sweeney were not flying.

=== Atomic bombing of Hiroshima ===
On August 6, 1945, Albury witnessed the first atomic bombing of Hiroshima as pilot of the instrument observation plane, The Great Artiste, which accompanied the Enola Gay commanded by Tibbets. Albury measured the levels of radioactivity and magnitude of the atomic bomb from his plane. He would later state in an interview with Time magazine, "When Tibbets dropped the bomb, we dropped our instruments and made our left turn. Then this bright light hit us and the top of that mushroom cloud was the most terrifying, but also the most beautiful, thing you've ever seen in your life. Every color in the rainbow seemed to be coming out of it."

=== Atomic bombing of Nagasaki ===
On August 9, 1945, just three days after the bombing of Hiroshima, Sweeney's crew, with Albury as co-pilot, took off in the B-29 Superfortress, nicknamed the Bockscar, which would drop the atomic bomb known as the "Fat Man" on the city of Nagasaki. The attack was delayed by cloud cover until the crew located a hole in the clouds. The Bockscar dropped the 10,200-pound "Fat Man" on the city of Nagasaki, instantly killing 40,000 people. The bomb exploded in the Urakami Valley where two major munition factories were located. An additional 35,000 Japanese citizens would succumb from radiation sickness and other injuries in the aftermath of the bombing.

Immediately after the formal surrender of Japan on September 2, 1945, Albury flew with Tibbetts, Sweeney and close to twenty other members of their aircrews to Japan. The group eventually reached Nagasaki and witnessed on the ground the destruction caused by the atomic bomb.

Albury stated repeatedly during his life that he did not have any remorse for the attack or his role in the attack on Nagasaki, noting that many more lives would have been lost if the United States had launched a full invasion of mainland Japan.

== Post-war life ==
At the end of World War II, Albury moved to Coral Gables, Florida with his wife, Roberta. He chose a career as a commercial airline pilot for the now defunct Eastern Air Lines and flew during their 1989 strike, causing him to be placed on the pilot industry's unofficial "Jumpseat Protection List" as a strikebreaker. He later became the co-manager of Eastern's Airbus A300 training program. He later moved to a house in Hunter's Creek (south Orlando) where he lived until his death.

Charles Donald Albury died on May 23, 2009, at a hospital in Orlando, Florida, at the age of 88. He had suffered from congestive heart failure for several years before his death. He appeared in the Smithsonian Networks program Smithsonian Channel's War Stories, "The Men Who Brought the Dawn", in 1995, giving his recollections and reflections on the two atomic bomb missions.
