= Bockscar =

Airplane that dropped the second atomic bomb

Coordinates: 39.781976°N 84.108892°W

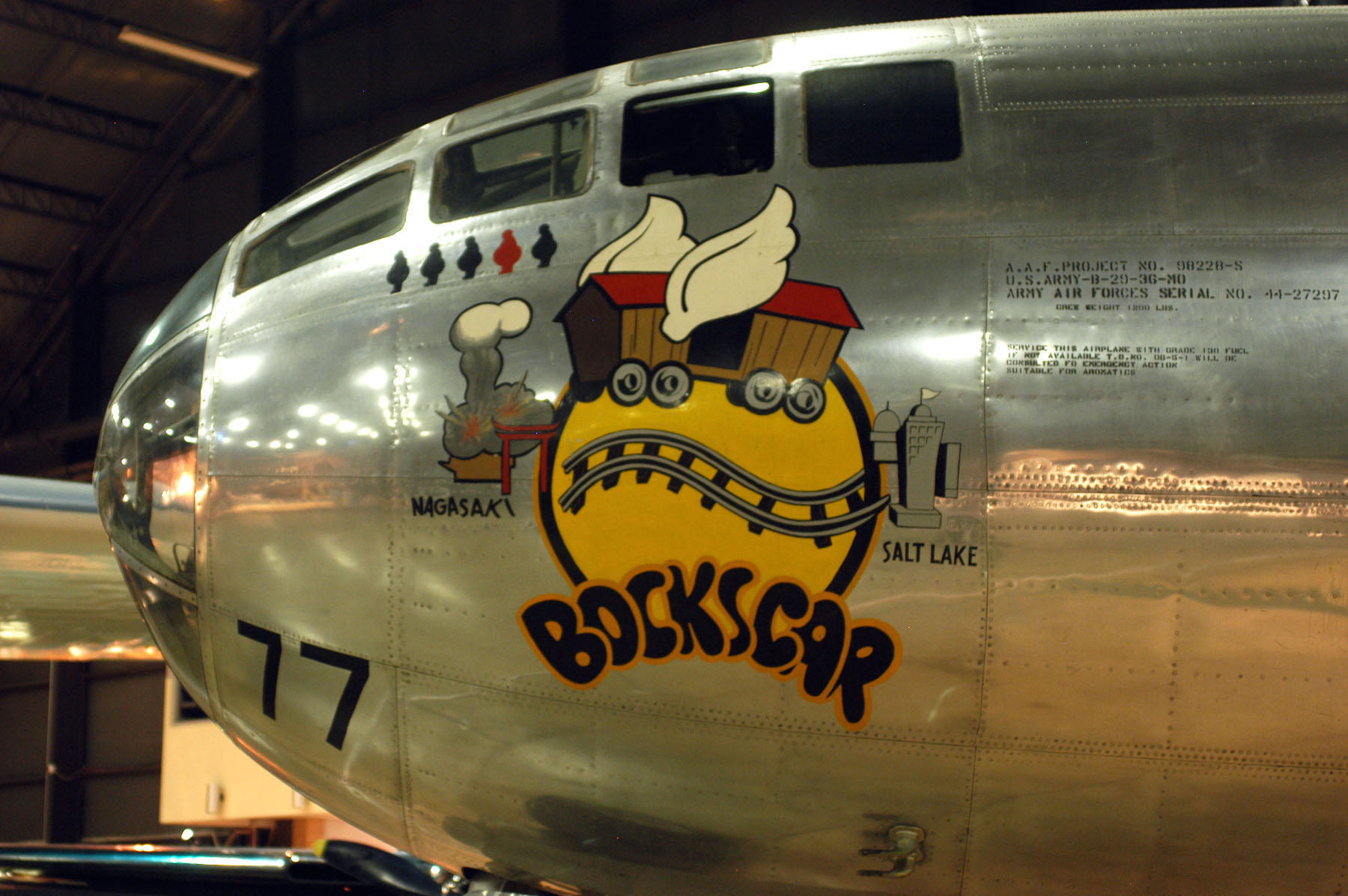
- Bockscar nose art: the Fat Man silhouettes represent four pumpkin bomb missions (black) and the atomic bomb drop on Nagasaki (a red symbol, fourth in the line of five symbols).

General information
- Type: B-29-36-MO Superfortress
- Manufacturer: Glenn L. Martin Company, Omaha, Nebraska
- Serial: 44-27297

History
- First flight: April 1945
- In service: April 1945 – September 1946
- Preserved at: The National Museum of the United States Air Force, Dayton, Ohio

Bockscar, sometimes called Bock's Car, is the United States Army Air Forces Boeing B-29 Superfortress bomber that dropped a Fat Man atomic bomb over the Japanese city of Nagasaki during World War II in the second – and most recent – nuclear attack in history. One of 15 Silverplate B-29s used by the 509th, Bockscar was built at the Glenn L. Martin Bomber Plant at Bellevue, Nebraska, at what is now Offutt Air Force Base, and delivered to the United States Army Air Forces on 19 March 1945. It was assigned to the 393rd Bombardment Squadron, 509th Composite Group to Wendover Army Air Field, Utah, in April and was named after captain Frederick C. Bock.

Bockscar was used in 13 training and practice missions from Tinian, and three combat missions in which it dropped pumpkin bombs on industrial targets in Japan. On 9 August 1945, Bockscar, piloted by the 393rd Bombardment Squadron's commander, Major Charles W. Sweeney, dropped a Fat Man nuclear bomb with a blast yield equivalent to 21 kilotonnes of TNT (88 TJ) over the city of Nagasaki. The explosion destroyed about 44% of the city, killed 35,000 people, and injured 60,000 people.

After the war, Bockscar returned to the United States in November 1945. In September 1946, it was given to the National Museum of the United States Air Force at Wright-Patterson Air Force Base, Ohio. The aircraft was flown to the museum on 26 September 1961, and its original markings were restored. Bockscar is now on permanent display at the National Museum of the United States Air Force, Dayton, Ohio, next to a replica of the Fat Man bomb.

== Airplane history ==
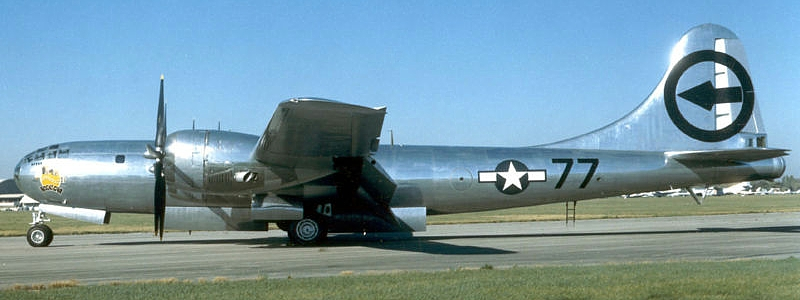
Bockscar at Dayton before it was moved indoors. On the Nagasaki mission, it flew without nose art, and with a triangle N tail marking, rather than the circle arrowhead shown here.

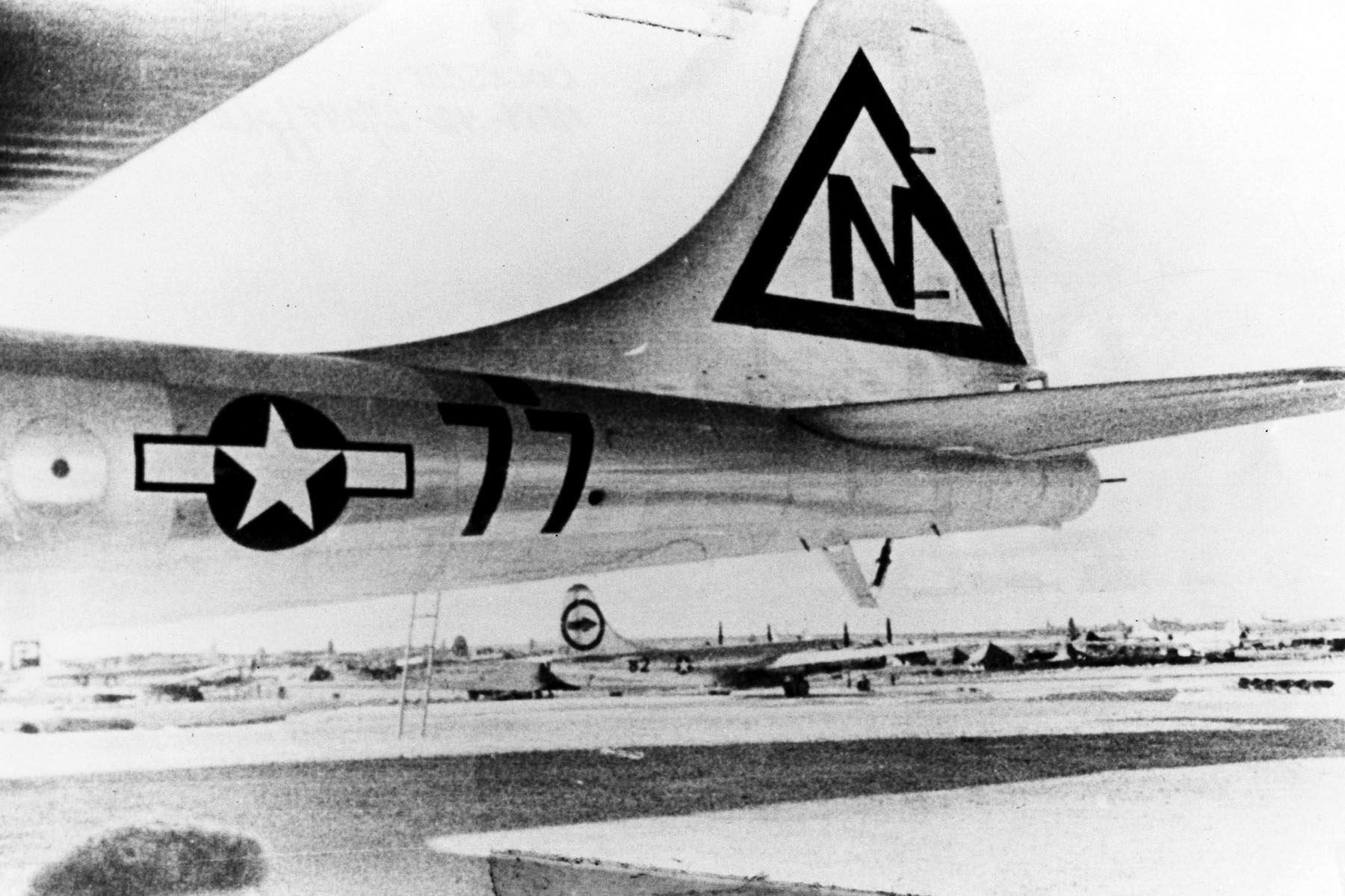
Bockscar with temporary triangle N tail marking, on 9 August 1945, the day of its atomic bombing mission

Bockscar, B-29-36-MO 44-27297, Victor number 77, was one of 15 Silverplate B-29s used by the 393d Bombardment Squadron of the 509th Composite Group. Bockscar was built by the Glenn L. Martin Company (later part of Lockheed Martin) at its bomber plant in Bellevue, Nebraska, located at Offutt Field, now Offutt Air Force Base. A Block 35 aircraft, it was one of ten modified as a Silverplate and re-designated "Block 36".

Silverplate involved extensive modifications to the B-29 to carry nuclear weapons. British suspensions and bracing were attached for both shape types, with the gun-type and implosion type mounted in the forward bay. The aft bay was equipped with additional fuel tanks. Weight reduction was also accomplished by removal of gun turrets and armor plating. These B-29s also had an improved engine, the R-3350-41 and reversible pitch Curtiss Electric propellers. The Silverplate aircraft represented a significant increase in performance over the standard variants.

Delivered to the U.S. Army Air Forces on 19 March 1945, Bockscar was assigned to Captain Frederick C. Bock and crew C-13, and flown to Wendover Army Air Field, Utah, in April. The name chosen for the aircraft, and painted on it after the mission, was a pun on the name of the aircraft commander, captain Frederick C. Bock. It left Wendover on 11 June 1945 for Tinian island, where it arrived 16 June. It was originally given the Victor (unit-assigned identification) number 7 but on 1 August was given the triangle N tail markings of the 444th Bombardment Group as a security measure, and had its Victor changed to 77 to avoid misidentification with an actual 444th aircraft.

Bockscar was used in 13 training and practice missions from Tinian, and three combat missions in which it dropped pumpkin bombs on industrial targets in Japan, in which Bock's crew bombed Niihama and Musashino, and First Lieutenant Charles Donald Albury and crew C-15 bombed Koromo.

== Atomic bomb mission ==
=== Mission and crew ===
The mission included three B-29 bombers and their crews: Bockscar, The Great Artiste, and The Big Stink. Bockscar was flown on 9 August 1945 by Crew C-15, which usually manned The Great Artiste; piloted by Major Charles W. Sweeney, commander of the 393d Bombardment Squadron; and co-piloted by First Lieutenant Charles Donald Albury, C-15's aircraft commander. The Great Artiste was designated as an observation and instrumentation support plane for the second mission, while The Big Stink – flown by group operations officer Major James I. Hopkins Jr. – as a photographic aircraft. The primary target was the city of Kokura, where the Kokura Arsenal was located, and the secondary target was Nagasaki, where two large Mitsubishi armament plants were located.

Bockscar had been flown by Sweeney and crew C-15 in three test drop rehearsals with inert Pumpkin bomb assemblies in the eight days leading up to the second mission, including a final rehearsal the day before. The Great Artiste, which was the assigned aircraft of the crew with whom Sweeney usually flew, had been designated in preliminary planning to drop the second bomb, but the aircraft had been fitted with observation instruments for the Hiroshima mission that took place three days earlier. Moving the instrumentation from The Great Artiste to Bockscar would have been a complex and time-consuming process, and when the second atomic bomb mission was moved up from 11 to 9 August because of adverse weather forecasts, the crews of The Great Artiste and Bockscar instead changed aircraft. The result was that the bomb was carried by Bockscar but flown by the crew C-15 of The Great Artiste.

=== Kokura and Nagasaki ===
During pre-flight inspection of Bockscar, the flight engineer notified Sweeney that an inoperative fuel transfer pump made it impossible to use 640 US gallons (2,400 L; 530 imp gal) of fuel carried in a reserve tank. This fuel would still have to be carried all the way to Japan and back, consuming still more fuel. Replacing the pump would take hours; moving the Fat Man to another aircraft might take just as long and was dangerous as well, as the bomb was live. Group Commander Colonel Paul Tibbets and Sweeney therefore elected to have Bockscar continue the mission.

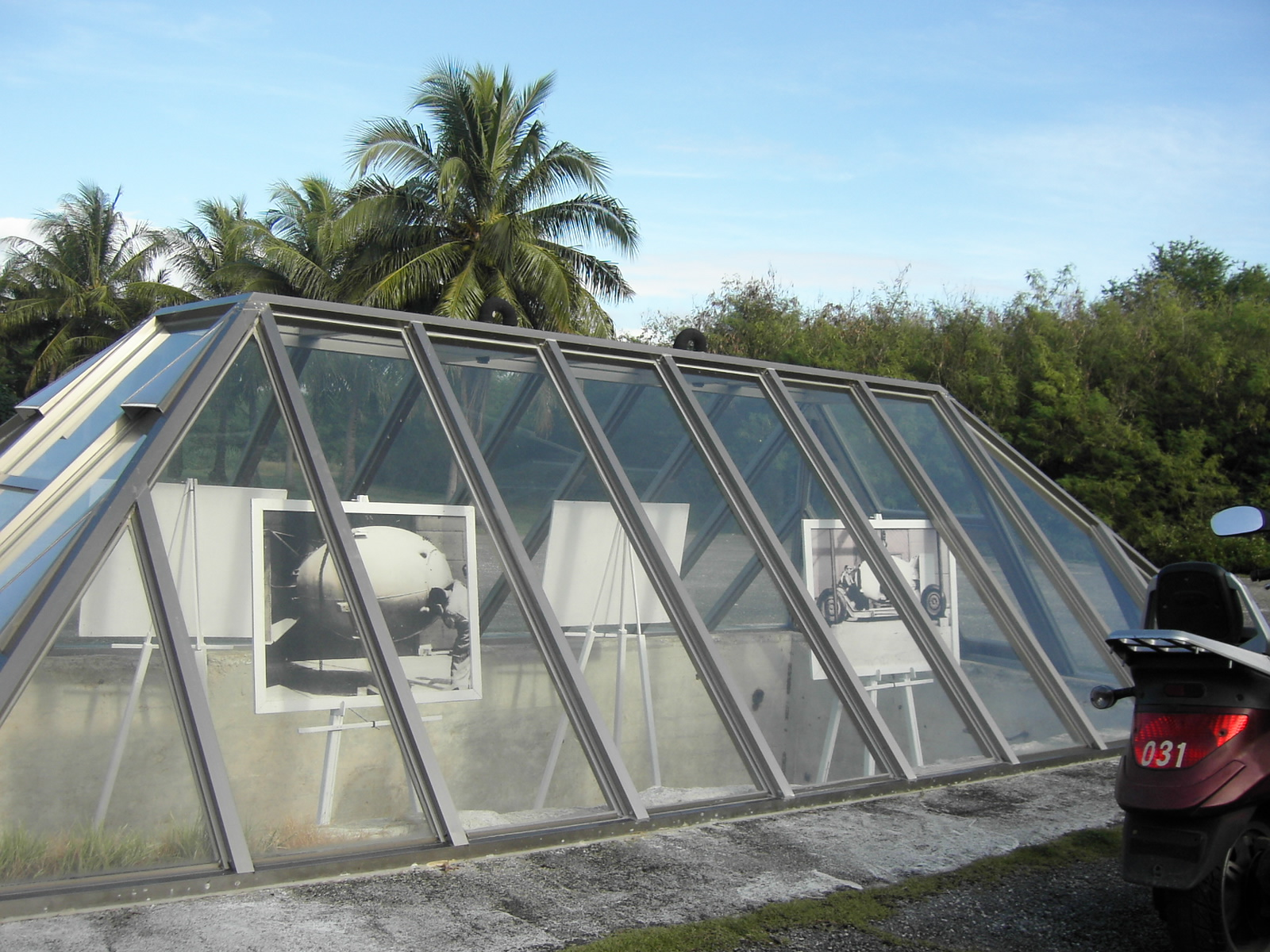
Preserved Tinian "bomb pit #2", where Fat Man was loaded aboard Bockscar

Bockscar took off from Tinian's North Field at 03:49. The mission profile directed the B-29s to fly individually to the rendezvous point; because of bad weather, this was changed from Iwo Jima to Yakushima Island, and the cruising altitude was changed to 17,000 feet (5,200 m) instead of the customary 9,000 feet (2,700 m), increasing fuel consumption. Bockscar began its climb to the 30,000 feet (9,100 m) bombing altitude a half hour before rendezvous. Before the mission, Tibbets had warned Sweeney to spend no more than 15 minutes at the rendezvous before proceeding to the target. Bockscar reached the rendezvous point and assembled with The Great Artiste; the planes then circled for some time, but The Big Stink failed to appear. As they orbited Yakushima, the weather planes Enola Gay (which had dropped the first atomic bomb on Hiroshima) and Laggin' Dragon reported both Kokura and Nagasaki within the accepted parameters for the required visual attack.

Sweeney continued to wait for The Big Stink beyond the ordered 15 minutes, finally proceeding to the target only at the urging of Commander Frederick Ashworth, the plane's weaponeer, who was in command of the mission. After exceeding the original departure time limit by a half hour, Bockscar, accompanied by the instrument airplane, The Great Artiste, arrived over Kokura, thirty minutes away. The delay at the rendezvous had resulted in clouds and drifting smoke from fires started by a major firebombing raid by 224 B-29s on nearby Yahata the previous day covering 70% of the area over Kokura, obscuring the aiming point. Three bomb runs were made over the next 50 minutes, burning fuel and exposing the aircraft repeatedly to the heavy defenses of Yahata, but the bombardier was unable to drop visually. By the time of the third bomb run, Japanese anti-aircraft fire was getting close, and First Lieutenant Jacob Beser, who was monitoring Japanese communications, reported activity on the Japanese fighter direction radio bands.

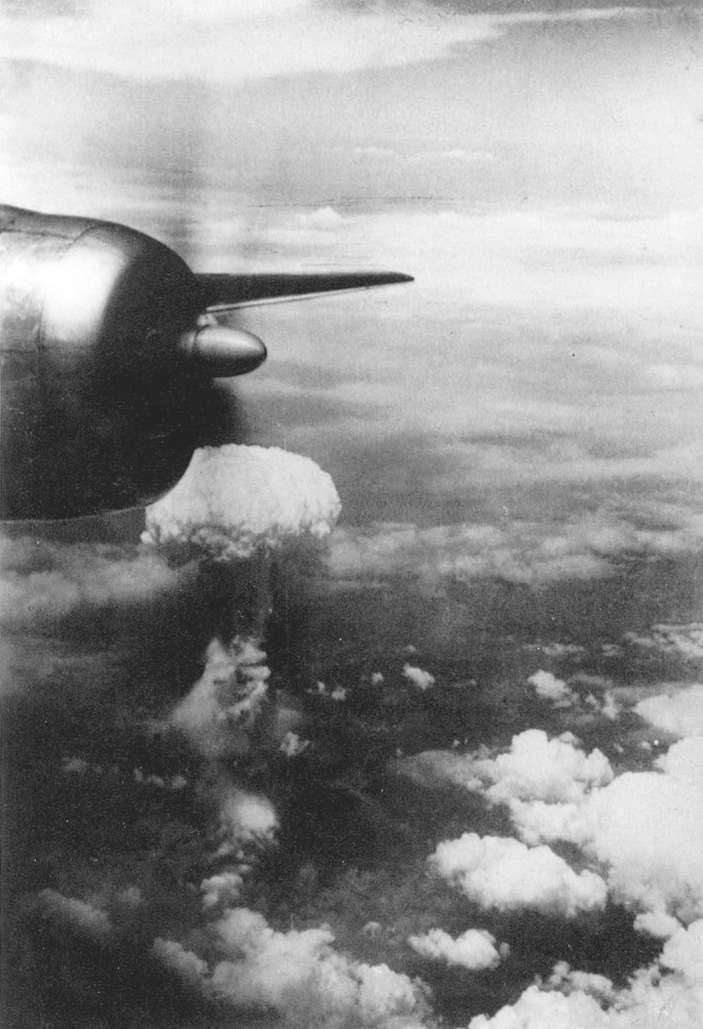
The mushroom cloud as seen from one of the B-29s on the mission

The increasingly critical fuel shortage resulted in the decision by Sweeney and Ashworth to reduce power to conserve fuel and divert to the secondary target, Nagasaki. The approach to Nagasaki twenty minutes later indicated that the heart of the city's downtown was also covered by dense cloud. Ashworth decided to bomb Nagasaki using radar, but, according to Bockscar's bombardier, Captain Kermit Beahan, a small opening in the clouds at the end of the three-minute bomb run permitted him to identify target features. Bockscar visually dropped the Fat Man at 10:58 local time. It exploded 43 seconds later with a blast yield equivalent to 21 kilotons of TNT at an altitude of 1,650 feet (500 m), approximately 1.5 miles (2.4 km) northwest of the planned aiming point, resulting in the destruction of 44% of the city.

The failure to drop the Fat Man at the precise bomb aim point caused the atomic blast to be confined to the Urakami Valley. As a consequence, a major portion of the city was protected by the intervening hills, but even so, the bomb was dropped over the city's industrial valley midway between the Mitsubishi Steel and Arms Works in the south and the Mitsubishi-Urakami Ordnance Works in the north. The explosion over Nagasaki killed an estimated 35,000 people and injured 60,000 people. Of those killed, 23,200–28,200 were Japanese munitions workers, 2,000 were Korean slave laborers, and 150 were Japanese soldiers.

=== Landing and debriefing ===
Because of the delays in the mission and the inoperative fuel transfer pump, the B-29 did not have sufficient fuel to reach the emergency landing field at Iwo Jima, so Sweeney flew the aircraft to Okinawa. Arriving there, he circled for 20 minutes trying to contact the control tower for landing clearance, finally concluding that his radio was faulty. Critically low on fuel, Bockscar barely made it to the runway at Yontan Airfield on Okinawa. With only enough fuel for one landing attempt, Sweeney and Albury brought Bockscar in at 150 miles per hour (240 km/h) instead of the normal 120 miles per hour (190 km/h), firing distress flares to alert the field of the uncleared landing. The number two engine died from fuel starvation as Bockscar began its final approach. Touching the runway hard, the heavy B-29 slewed left and toward a row of parked B-24 bombers before the pilots managed to regain control. The B-29's reversible propellers were insufficient to slow the aircraft adequately, and with both pilots standing on the brakes, Bockscar made a swerving 90-degree turn at the end of the runway to avoid running off the runway. A second engine died from fuel exhaustion by the time the plane came to a stop. The flight engineer later measured fuel in the tanks and concluded that less than five minutes total remained.

Following the mission, there was confusion over the identification of the plane. The first eyewitness account by war correspondent William L. Laurence of The New York Times, who accompanied the mission aboard the aircraft piloted by Bock, reported that Sweeney was leading the mission in The Great Artiste. However, he also noted its "Victor" number as 77, which was that of Bockscar, writing that several personnel commented that 77 was also the jersey number of the football player Red Grange. Laurence had interviewed Sweeney and his crew in depth and was aware that they referred to their airplane as The Great Artiste. Except for Enola Gay, none of the 393rd's B-29s had yet had names painted on the noses, a fact which Laurence himself noted in his account, and unaware of the switch in aircraft, Laurence assumed Victor 77 was The Great Artiste. In fact, The Great Artiste was Victor 89.

== Post-war status ==
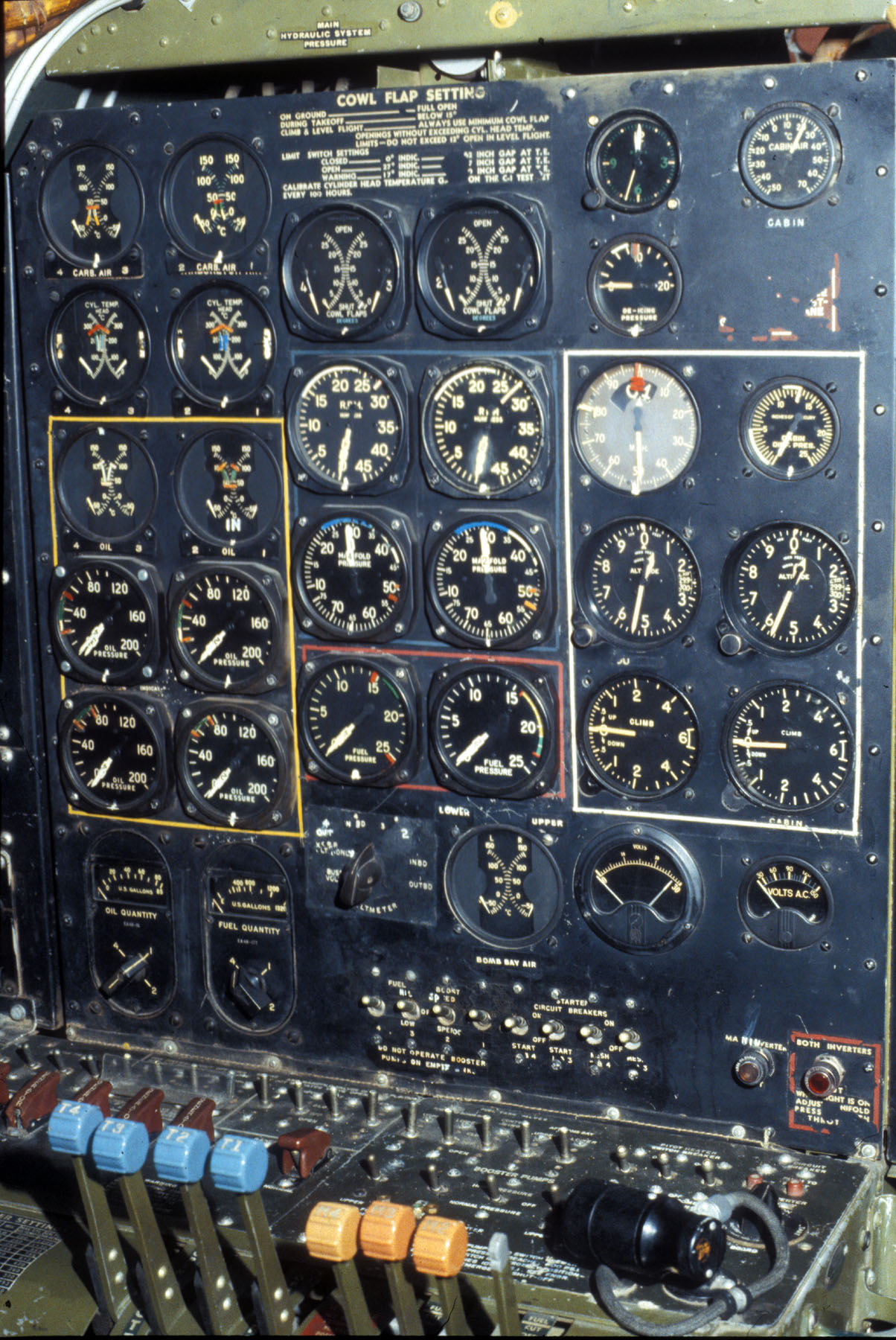
Engine controls

After the war, Bockscar returned to the United States in November 1945 and served with the 509th at Roswell Army Air Field, New Mexico. It was nominally assigned to the Operation Crossroads nuclear weapons test task force, but there are no records indicating that it deployed for the tests. In August 1946, it was assigned to the 4105th Army Air Force Unit at Davis-Monthan Army Air Field, Arizona, for storage.

At Davis-Monthan it was placed on display as the aircraft that bombed Nagasaki, but in the markings of The Great Artiste. In September 1946, title was passed to the Air Force Museum (now the National Museum of the United States Air Force) at Wright-Patterson Air Force Base, Ohio. The aircraft was flown to the museum on 26 September 1961, and its original markings were restored. As of 2013, Bockscar is on permanent display at the National Museum of the United States Air Force, Dayton, Ohio. This display, a primary exhibit in the museum's Air Power gallery, includes a replica of a Fat Man bomb and signage that states that it was "The aircraft that ended WWII".

In 2005, a short documentary was made about Charles Sweeney's recollections of the Nagasaki mission aboard Bockscar, including details of the mission preparation, titled Nagasaki: The Commander's Voice.

== Crew members ==
=== Regularly assigned crew ===
Crew C-13 (manned The Great Artiste on the Nagasaki mission):

- Captain Frederick C. Bock, aircraft commander, Greenville, Michigan
- First Lieutenant Hugh Cardwell Ferguson Sr., co-pilot, Highland Park, Michigan
- First Lieutenant Leonard A. Godfrey Jr., navigator, Greenfield, Massachusetts
- First Lieutenant Charles Levy, bombardier, Philadelphia, Pennsylvania
- Master Sergeant Roderick F. Arnold, flight engineer, Rochester, Michigan
- Sergeant Ralph D. Belanger, assistant flight engineer, Thendara, New York
- Sergeant Ralph D. Curry, radio operator, Hoopeston, Illinois
- Sergeant William C. Barney, radar operator, Columbia City, Indiana
- Sergeant Robert J. Stock, tail gunner, Fort Wayne, Indiana

=== Nagasaki mission crew ===
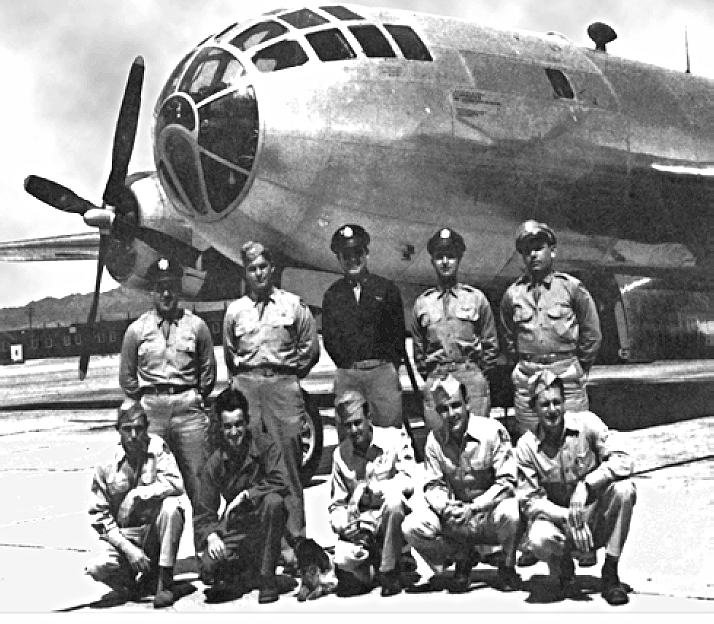
Crew C-15. front row: Dehart, Kuharek, Buckley, Gallagher, Spitzer; back row: Olivi, Beahan, Sweeney, Van Pelt, Albury

Crew C-15 (normally assigned to The Great Artiste):

- Major Charles W. Sweeney, aircraft commander, North Quincy, Massachusetts
- Captain Charles Donald "Don" Albury, co-pilot (pilot of Crew C-15), Miami, Florida
- Second Lieutenant Frederick "Fred" J. Olivi, regular co-pilot, Chicago, Illinois
- Captain James F. Van Pelt Jr., navigator, Oak Hill, West Virginia
- Captain Kermit K. Beahan, bombardier, Houston, Texas
- Master Sergeant John D. Kuharek, flight engineer, Sharpsburg, Pennsylvania
- Staff Sergeant Raymond C. Gallagher, gunner, assistant flight engineer, Chicago, Illinois
- Staff Sergeant Edward K. Buckley, radar operator, Lisbon, Ohio
- Sergeant Abe M. Spitzer, radio operator, Bronx, New York
- Sergeant Albert T. "Pappy" DeHart, tail gunner, Plainview, Texas

Additional mission personnel on board:

- Commander Frederick Ashworth, USN, weaponeer
- Lieutenant Philip M. Barnes, USN, assistant weaponeer
- First Lieutenant Jacob Beser, radar countermeasures, Baltimore, Maryland (Beser flew on both atomic missions, serving as the radar countermeasures crewman on the Enola Gay on 6 August 1945 and on Bockscar on 9 August 1945).

== National Museum of the United States Air Force display ==
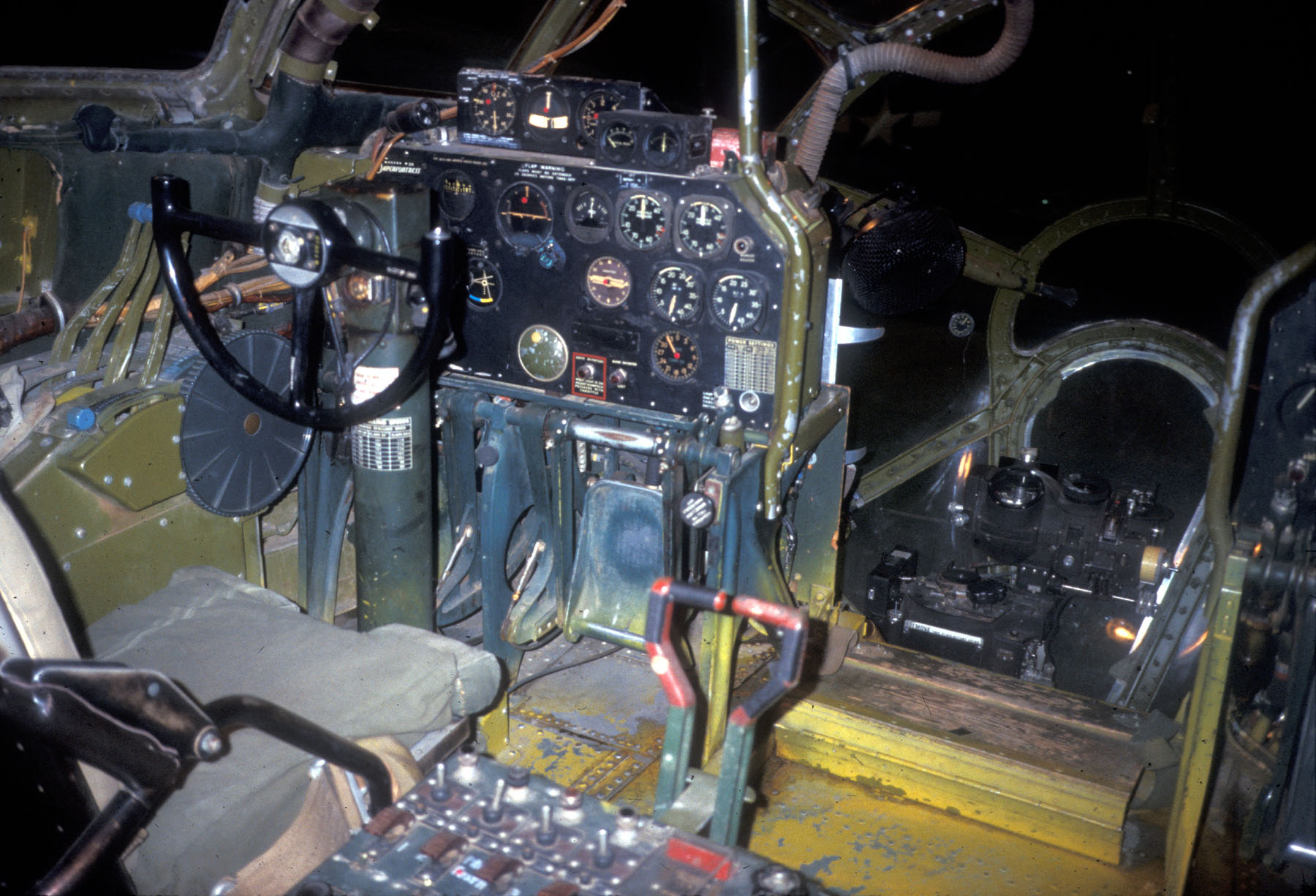

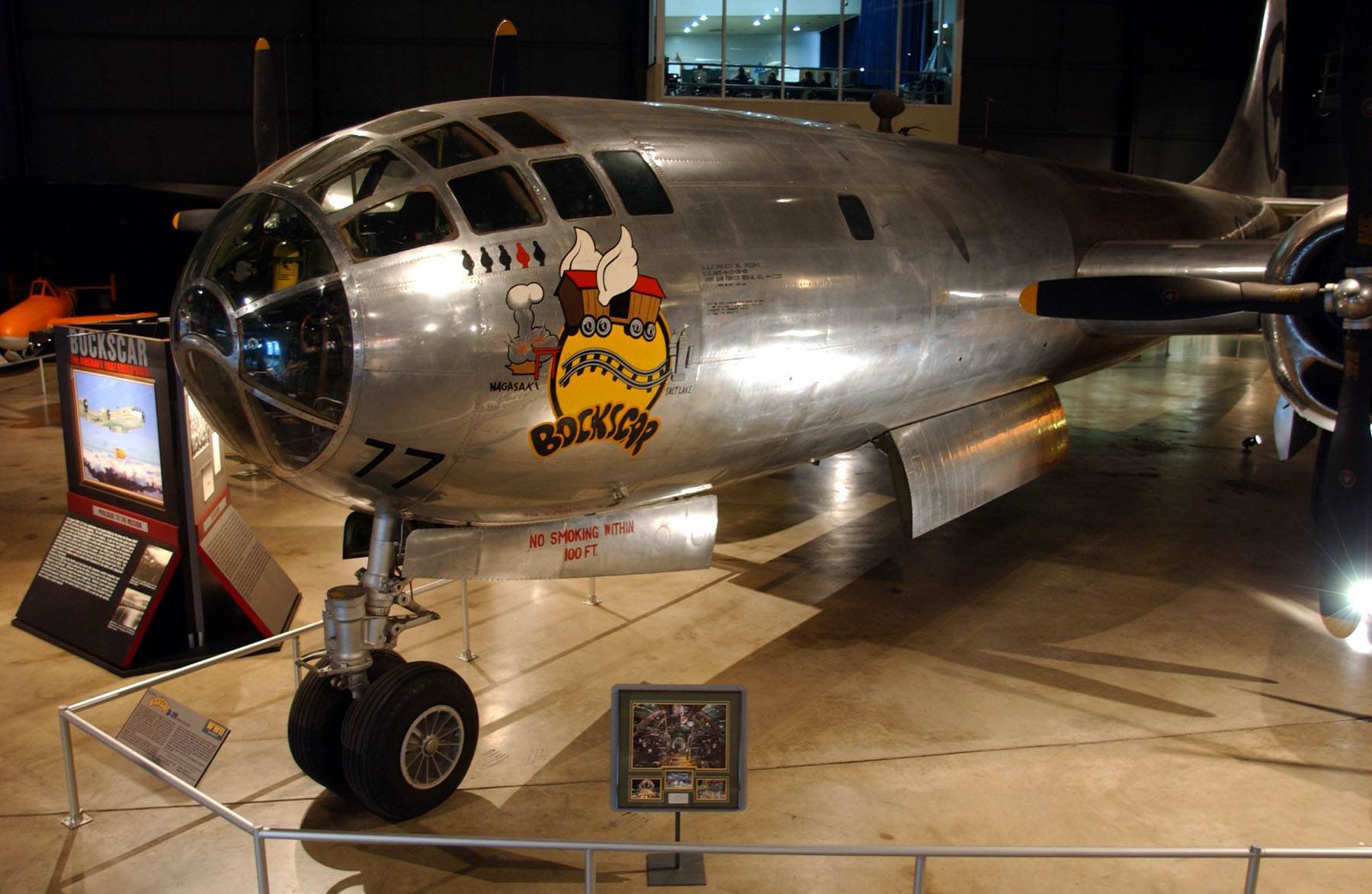

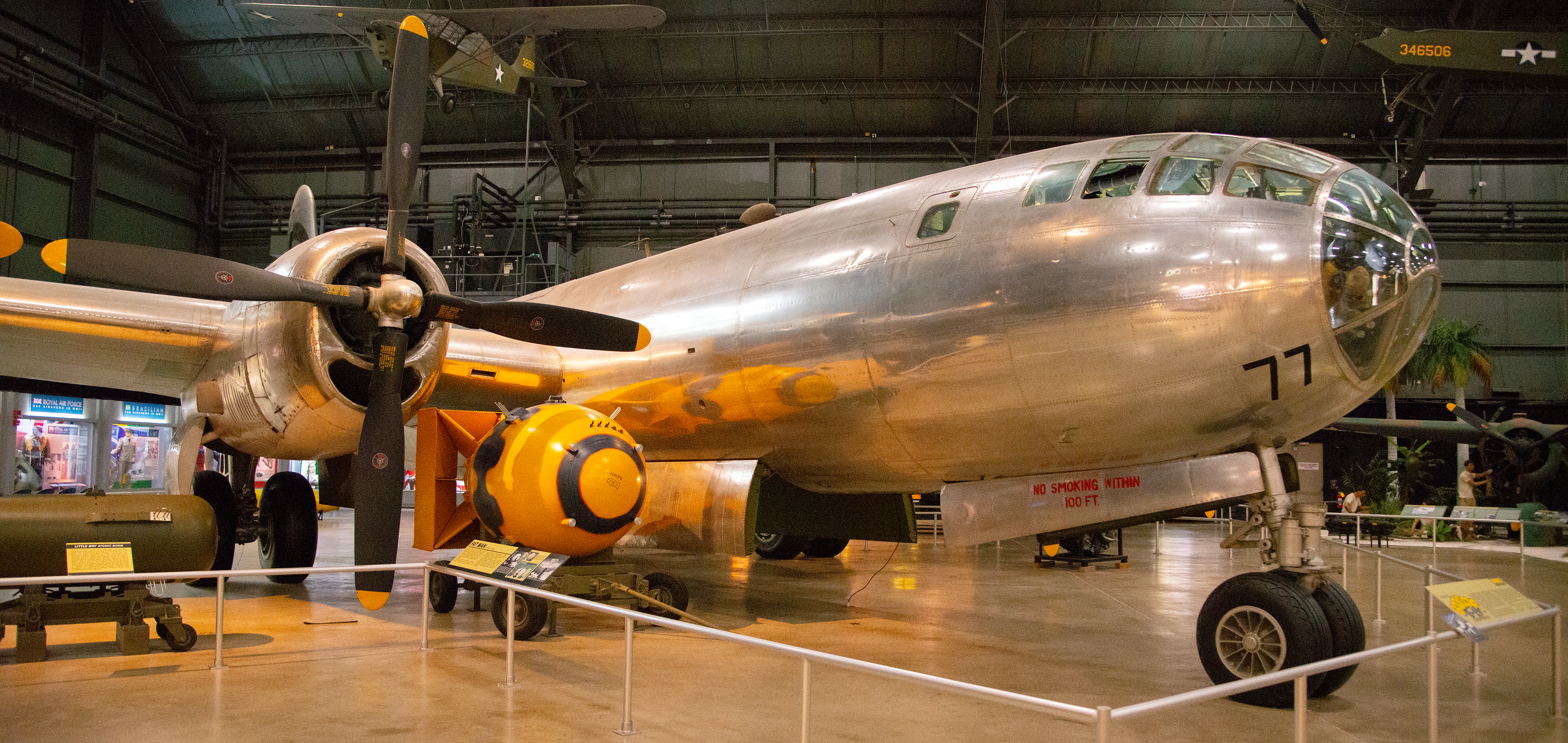
