= The Great Artiste =

Aircraft used during the raid on Hiroshima on 6 August 1945

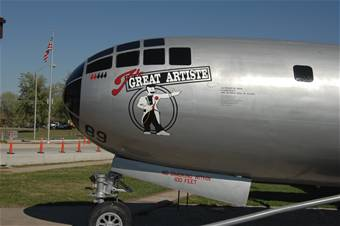
- A B-29 painted to look like The Great Artiste (the original plane was scrapped) at the Whiteman Air Force Base

General information
- Type: Boeing B-29-40-MO Superfortress
- Manufacturer: Glenn L. Martin Company, Omaha, Nebraska
- Serial: 44-27353

History
- In service: 1945–1948
- Fate: Crashed on take-off at Goose Bay Air Base, Labrador and scrapped

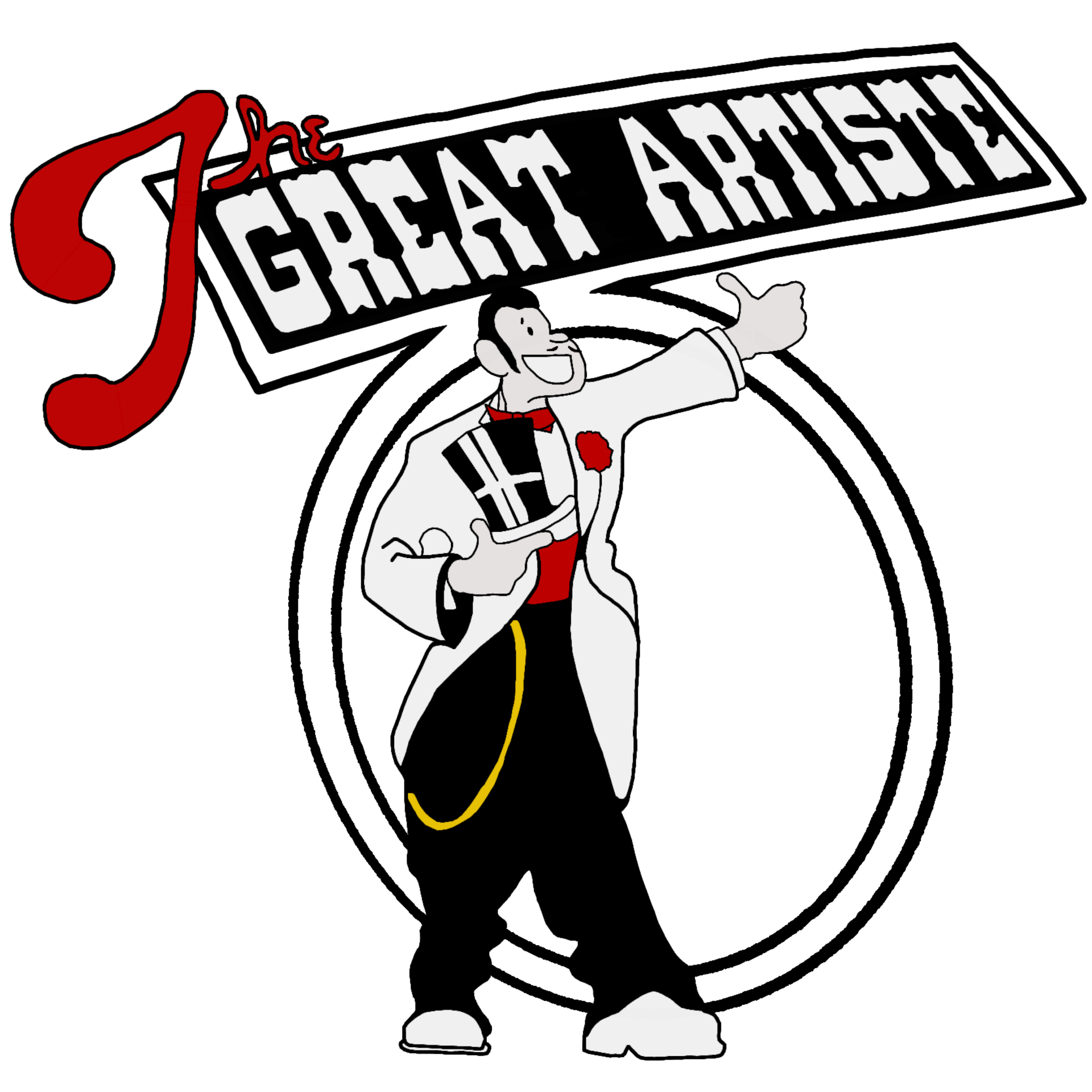
First version of The Great Artiste nose art

Second version of The Great Artiste nose art

The Great Artiste was a U.S. Army Air Forces Silverplate B-29 bomber (B-29-40-MO 44-27353, Victor number 89), assigned to the 393d Bomb Squadron, 509th Composite Group. The aircraft was named for its bombardier, Captain Kermit Beahan, in reference to his bombing talents. It flew 12 training and practice missions in which it bombed Japanese-held Pacific islands and dropped pumpkin bombs on targets in Japan.

After the war ended it returned with the 509th Composite Group to Roswell Army Air Field, New Mexico. It was scrapped in September 1949 after being heavily damaged in an accident at Goose Bay Air Base, Labrador, the year before.

== Aircraft history ==
Built at the Glenn L. Martin Aircraft Plant at Omaha, Nebraska, The Great Artiste (B-29-40-MO 44-27353) was a Silverplate B-29 Superfortress bomber. It was accepted by the Army Air Forces on 20 April 1945, and flown to Wendover Army Air Field, Utah, by its assigned crew C-15, commanded by First Lieutenant Charles D. Albury, in May. It departed Wendover for North Field, Tinian on 22 June.

It was originally assigned Victor (unit-assigned identification) number 9, but on 1 August it was given the circle R tail markings of the 6th Bombardment Group as a security measure, and it had its Victor number changed to 89 to avoid misidentification with actual 6th Bombardment Group aircraft. Its nose art was painted after the Nagasaki mission. The name purportedly referred to the talents of the bombardier, Captain Kermit Beahan, with both the Norden bombsight and with women.

In addition to its use on the nuclear bomb missions, The Great Artiste was flown by five different crews on 12 training and practice missions. It flew bombing missions against Rota on 4 July, Truk on 8 July, and Marcus on 9 July. It returned to bomb Rota again on 12 and 14 July, and bombed Guguan on 18 and 19 July. It was flown by Albury and crew C-15 on two combat missions, one of which was aborted, and the other in which it used a pumpkin bomb to attack the railroad yards at Kobe on 24 July. Captain Bob Lewis and crew B-9 flew it to drop a pumpkin bomb on an industrial target in Koriyama on 29 July.

Flown by 393d commander, Major Charles W. Sweeney, it was assigned to the Hiroshima mission on 6 August 1945, as the blast measurement instrumentation aircraft. On the mission to bomb Nagasaki on 9 August 1945, it was to have been the aircraft carrying the bomb, but the mission schedule had been moved forward two days because of weather considerations, and the instrumentation had not yet been removed from the aircraft. To avoid delaying the mission, Sweeney traded airplanes with the crew of Bockscar to carry the Fat Man atomic bomb to Nagasaki. Captain Frederick C. Bock and his C-13 crew flew The Great Artiste to Nagasaki on its instrument support mission, and landed with it on Okinawa at the conclusion of the mission. It was the only aircraft to directly participate in both missions. Enola Gay, flown by Captain George Marquardt's Crew B-10, was the weather reconnaissance aircraft for Kokura, the primary target on the Nagasaki flight. Enola Gay reported clear skies over Kokura.

In November 1945 it returned with the 509th Composite Group to Roswell Army Air Field, New Mexico, where it remained for the rest of its flying career, except for a brief period when it was assigned to Task Force 1.5 for Operation Crossroads nuclear tests at Bikini Atoll in July 1946. It returned to the 509th, now designated the 509th Bombardment Group, in September. On 3 September 1948, during a polar navigation training mission, it developed an engine problem after takeoff from Goose Bay Air Base, Labrador, and ran off the end of the runway when attempting to land. Heavily damaged, it never flew again, and was eventually scrapped at Goose Bay in September 1949, despite its historical significance.

== Displays ==
A representation of The Great Artiste is on static display at the "Spirit Gate" of Whiteman Air Force Base, Missouri, now home base of the 509th Operations Group. The aircraft, originally B-29 44-61671, which served as an SB-29 "Super Dumbo" rescue aircraft during the Korean War, was refurbished to depict The Great Artiste and moved to Whiteman after the closure of Pease Air Force Base in 1991.

== Hiroshima mission crew ==
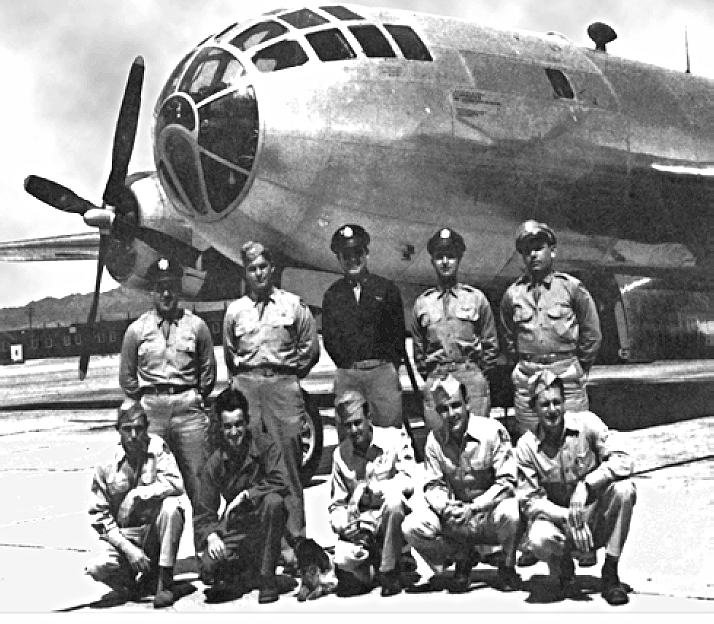
Crew C-15 at Wendover. front row: Dehart, Kuharek, Buckley, Gallagher, Spitzer; back row: Olivi, Beahan, Sweeney, Van Pelt, Albury

Crew C-15 (normally assigned to The Great Artiste):

- Major Charles W. Sweeney, aircraft commander
- 1st Lieutenant Charles D. (Don) Albury, pilot
- 2nd Lieutenant Fred Olivi, co-pilot
- Captain James Van Pelt, navigator
- Captain Kermit K. Beahan, bombardier
- Corporal Abe Spitzer, radio operator
- Master Sergeant John D. Kuharek, flight engineer
- Staff Sergeant Ray Gallagher, gunner, assistant flight engineer
- Staff Sergeant Edward Buckley, radar operator
- Sergeant Albert Dehart, tail gunner

Project Alberta observers aboard for Hiroshima mission:

- Luis Alvarez
- Harold Agnew
- Lawrence H. Johnston

Ground crew:

- Chester V. Pawlack
- Charles B. Rinard
- Claude C. Gilliam
- Allan L. Moore
- James J. Reilly
- Theron L. Blaisdell
- Robert E. Davenport

== Nagasaki mission crew ==
Crew C-13 (normally assigned to Bockscar):

- Captain Frederick C. Bock, aircraft commander
- Lieutenant Hugh C. Ferguson, co-pilot
- Lieutenant Leonard A. Godfrey, navigator
- Lieutenant Charles Levy, bombardier
- Master Sergeant Roderick F. Arnold, flight engineer
- Sergeant Ralph D. Belanger, assistant flight engineer
- Sergeant Ralph D. Curry, radio operator
- Sergeant William C. Barney, radar operator
- Sergeant Robert J. Stock, tail gunner

Observers aboard:

- Staff Sergeant Walter Goodman (Project Alberta)
- Lawrence H. Johnston (Project Alberta)
- Technical Sergeant Jesse Kupferberg (Project Alberta)
- William L. Laurence, correspondent for The New York Times
