= Frederick Ashworth =

United States Navy admiral

Frederick Lincoln Ashworth
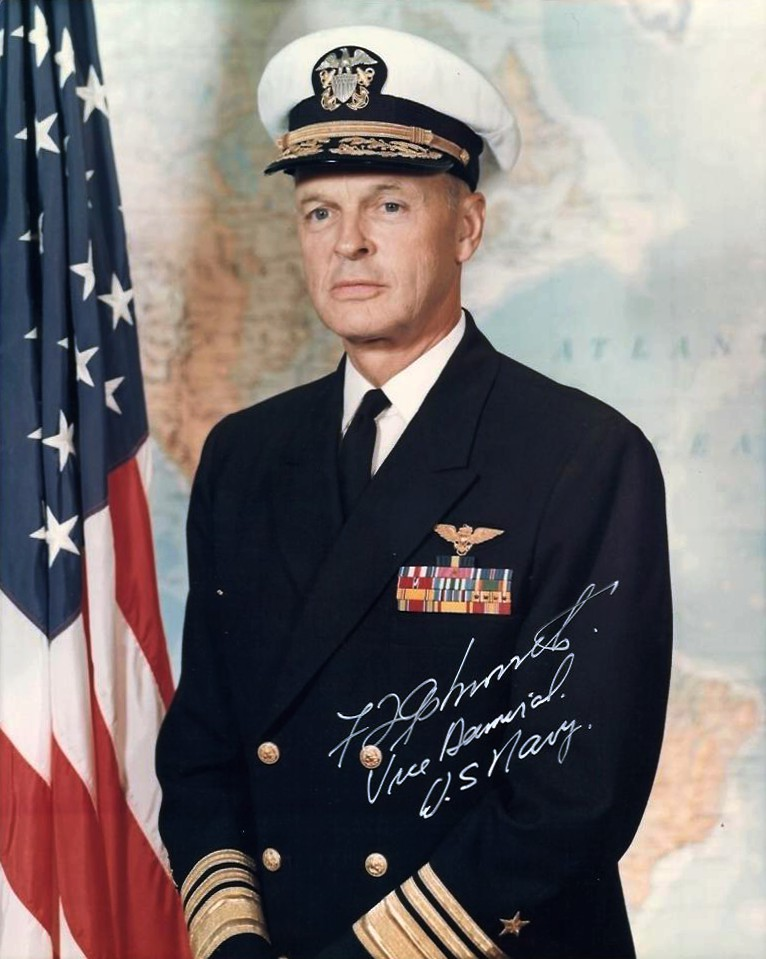
- Nickname: "Dick"
- Born: 24 January 1912; Beverly, Massachusetts
- Died: 3 December 2005 (aged 93) Phoenix, Arizona
- Allegiance: United States of America
- Branch: United States Navy
- Service years: 1933–1968
- Rank: Vice Admiral
- Service number: 0-72354
- Commands: Sixth Fleet
- Conflicts: World War II: Battle of New Georgia; Gilbert and Marshall Islands campaign; Bombing of Hiroshima and Nagasaki; Operation Crossroads
- Awards: Distinguished Service Medal (2); Silver Star; Legion of Merit (2); Bronze Star Medal

Frederick Lincoln "Dick" Ashworth (24 January 1912 – 3 December 2005) was a United States Navy officer who served as the weaponeer on the B-29 Bockscar that dropped a Fat Man atomic bomb on Nagasaki, Japan on 9 August 1945 during World War II.

A 1933 graduate of the United States Naval Academy at Annapolis, Maryland, Ashworth commanded Torpedo Squadron Eleven (VT-11), a Grumman TBF Avenger unit based on Guadalcanal that flew patrol, search, spotting, strike, and night mine-laying missions in support of the New Georgia Campaign in the Solomon Islands. He was awarded the Distinguished Flying Cross for heroism while carrying out these missions. He then participated in the Gilbert and Marshall Islands campaign as aviation officer on the staff of Vice Admiral Richmond K. Turner's V Amphibious Force.

Rotated back to the United States in June 1944, Ashworth became senior naval aviator at the Naval Proving Ground in Dahlgren, Virginia. In November 1944 he was assigned to the Manhattan Project, and supervised the testing of atomic bomb components at Wendover. In February 1945, he travelled to Guam, where he met Fleet Admiral Chester Nimitz, and selected Tinian as a base of operations for the 509th Composite Group. After the war he selected Bikini Atoll as the site for Operation Crossroads.

Remaining in the navy after the war, Ashworth rose to the rank of vice admiral in May 1966. He was Commandant of Midshipmen at the United States Naval Academy in 1958, and served as commander of the United States Sixth Fleet from September 1966 to April 1967. He retired from the navy in 1968, and died in 2005.

== Early life ==
Frederick Lincoln "Dick" Ashworth was born in Beverly, Massachusetts on 24 January 1912, the third child of Fred Ashworth, who worked as a draughtsman and tool designer for the United Shoe Machinery Corporation, and his wife Minnie. He had two older brothers, Phil and Bentley. Phil graduated from the United States Naval Academy at Annapolis, Maryland, in 1931, but died in a 1938 seaplane crash off Pearl Harbor.

The family moved to a farmhouse in Wenham, Massachusetts, in 1918. Ashworth attended Center School in Wenham, and then, as Wenham had no high school of its own, Beverly High School, where he was president of the Student Council. Too young and small for football, he participated in track and cross country running. He graduated in 1928, and then entered Dartmouth College.

Ashworth decided that he wanted to go to Annapolis like his brother. He sat and passed the examinations for an appointment from his local Congressman, but did not secure one of the Congressman's two appointments. However, in August 1929, he was informed that one of the Congressman's appointments had been rejected for defective teeth. Ashworth then entered Annapolis. He graduated 134th in the class of 1933, and was commissioned as an ensign.

== Naval career ==
=== Solomon Islands ===
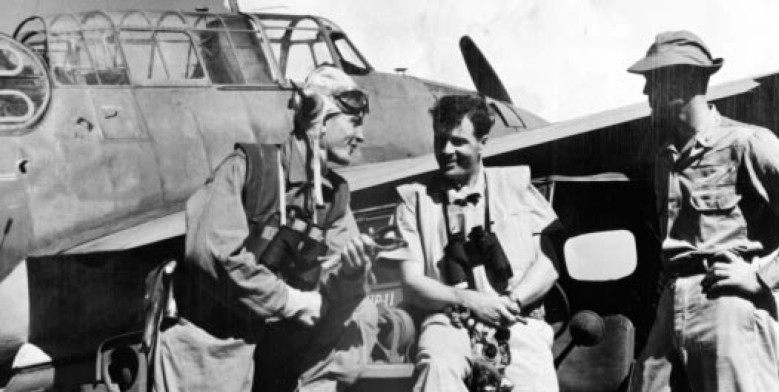
Ashworth (right) with VT-11 in the Solomon Islands

Ashworth's first posting was to the battleship USS West Virginia. He married Nathalie Louise (Nan) Bliss from Peabody, Massachusetts in June 1935. They had three sons: Frederick Jr., David and Stephen. In 1936, he was accepted for aviator training, and reported to the Pensacola Naval Air Station. He then held various positions including air photography officer for the United States Pacific Fleet. In 1939, he volunteered for postgraduate study at Annapolis as an aviation ordinance engineer.

By the time Ashworth graduated in June 1942, the United States had entered World War II. He became commander of Torpedo Squadron Eleven (VT-11), a Grumman TBF Avenger unit based on Guadalcanal. VT-11 pilots flew patrol, search, spotting, strike, and night mine-laying missions in support of the New Georgia Campaign in the Solomon Islands. Ashworth was awarded the Distinguished Flying Cross and the Bronze Star Medal. His Distinguished Flying Cross citation read:

The President of the United States of America takes pleasure in presenting the Distinguished Flying Cross to Lieutenant Commander Frederick Lincoln Ashworth (NSN: 0-72354), United States Navy, for heroism and extraordinary achievement while participating in aerial flight in aerial attacks as the commanding officer of a Torpedo Bomber Squadron against Japanese shore installations and shipping in the Solomon Islands area during the period from 26 April to 12 July 1943. During the nights of 18, 20 and 23 May, Lieutenant Commander Ashworth led his squadron in mine laying missions in the Kahili-Shortland area, South Bougainville. It was necessary that level flight at one thousand feet, constant speed and steady course be maintained for periods of time up to one and one-half minutes duration approximately one thousand yards from heavily-fortified Japanese positions. His plane made the longest run on each mission and despite illumination by a concentration of enemy searchlights and heavy enemy anti-aircraft fire these extremely hazardous missions were carried out effectively. He led two night anti-shipping missions in the same area on the nights of 15 and 28 May 1943. On the night of 15 May, he personally by aggressive, daring, and exceptionally well planned attack scored a confirmed hit on an enemy cargo ship. Lieutenant Commander Ashworth also participated in a daylight shipping raid in the same area which was pressed home despite considerable enemy aircraft opposition. He led his squadron in seven successful and highly effective bombing raids against Munda, two against Rekata Bay, and one against Vila, all of which were strongly defended enemy positions. His conduct was in keeping with the highest traditions of the United States Naval Service.

In September 1943, Ashworth was posted to the staff of Vice Admiral Richmond K. Turner's V Amphibious Force as aviation officer. In this capacity he served in the Gilbert and Marshall Islands campaign.

=== Project Alberta ===
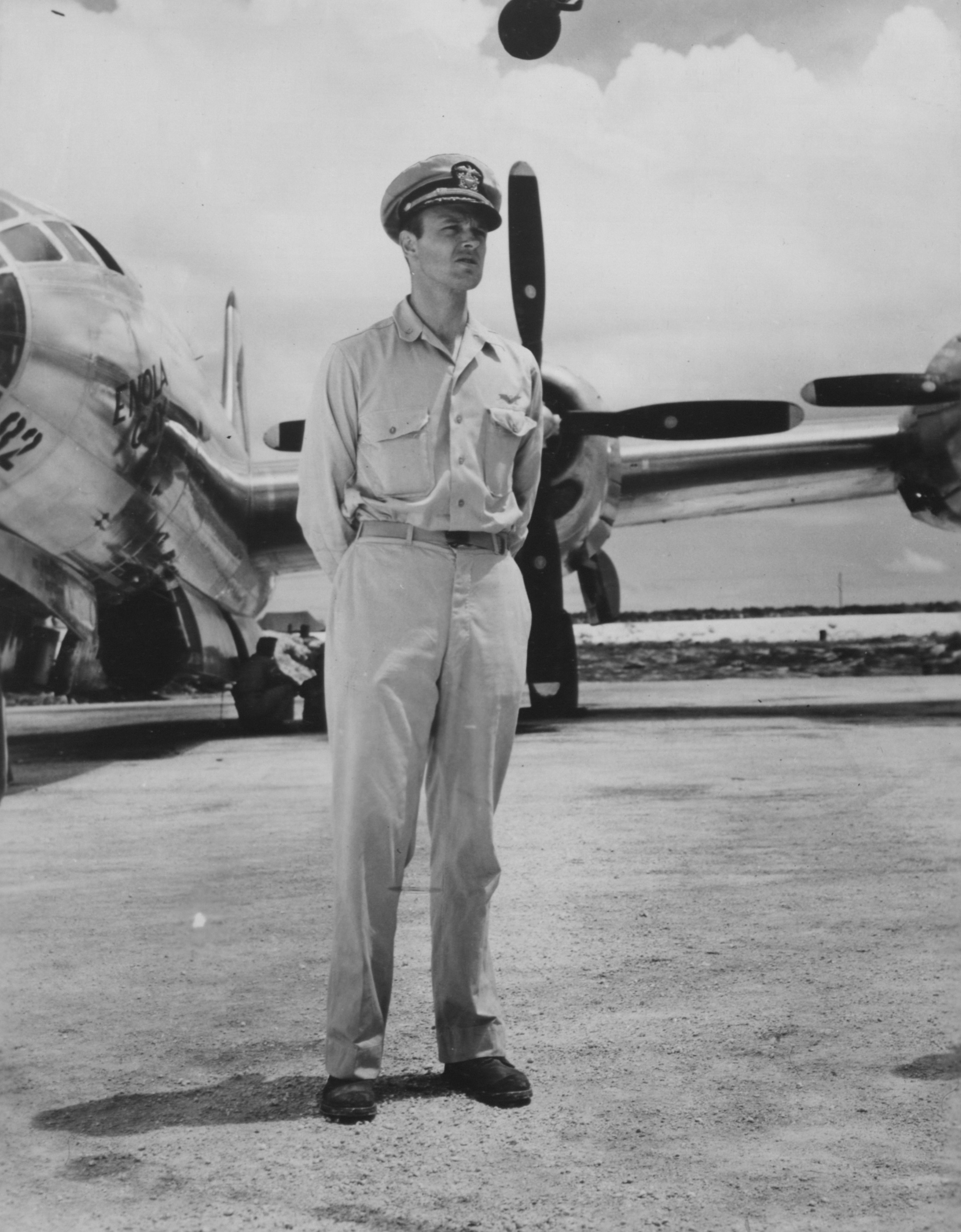
Ashworth in front of the Enola Gay.

In June 1944, Ashworth was rotated back to the United States, where he became senior naval aviator at the Naval Proving Ground in Dahlgren, Virginia. In November he was assigned to the Manhattan Project. He later recalled that

My job at Los Alamos was to supervise and coordinate the work of engineers in the testing at Wendover of bomb components then being developed at Los Alamos. I don't know who thought that the Los Alamos people needed supervising and coordinating by a young commander, US Navy. But I was able to run interference for them with the base commander, Colonel Heflin, and I think in useful ways. That wasn't difficult either because Colonel Heflin was one fine Air Force officer.

Holding the rank of commander, he became Director of Operations for Project Alberta, the portion of the Manhattan Project tasked with dropping of the weapons on Japan. In February 1945, Ashworth was sent to Guam to deliver a letter to Fleet Admiral Chester Nimitz from Fleet Admiral Ernest King ordering him to provide whatever support the Manhattan Project required. Ashworth's first task was to select a suitable base area for the 509th Composite Group. After looking at Guam and Saipan, he decided that Tinian would be more suitable, as it was closer to Japan than Guam, and had better facilities than Saipan. At the suggestion of island commander, Brigadier General Frederick V. H. Kimble, Ashworth selected an area at the northern end of the island.

The Director of the Manhattan Project, Major General Leslie R. Groves, Jr., wanted each nuclear strike mission to be commanded by a "weaponeer", a Project Alberta service academy graduate who would fly on the bomb-carrying aircraft and make such tactical decisions as were required. Only two officers met this requirement: Ashworth and his commanding officer, Captain William S. Parsons. The two therefore agreed that they would flying alternating missions. Parsons therefore commanded the Hiroshima mission, while Ashworth commanded the Nagasaki mission. For this mission, Ashworth was awarded the Silver Star Medal. His citation read:

The President of the United States of America, authorized by Act of Congress July 9, 1918, takes pleasure in presenting the Silver Star (Army Award) to Commander Frederick Lincoln Ashworth (NSN: 0-72354), United States Navy, for gallantry in action while engaged in aerial flight against the Japanese Empire on 9 August 1945, from a base in the Marianas Islands. Commander Ashworth was Senior Military Technical Observer on a B-29 aircraft carrying the second atomic bomb to be employed in the history of warfare. After the Superfort was well away from its island base, Commander Ashworth personally entered the bomb bay to fuze the atomic bomb. Following a circuitous course to the Japanese Empire in order to avoid heavy weather, they arrived over the primary target with low reserves of gasoline. Despite this and the possibility of damage from anti-aircraft fire or enemy fighters, he advised that an effort be made to bomb the primary target and the big plane remained over the city for nearly one hour, making three attempts to drop the new bomb, all failing because smoke obscured the target. Little more than enough fuel remained for Superfort to reach the nearest emergency landing field but they set a course directly across the Empire, disregarding the dangers of flak and enemy fighter attacks, and under Commander Ashworth's direction released the bomb on the secondary target, the important industrial city of Nagasaki. The tremendous blast which followed destroyed a square mile of the city and played an important part in bringing forth an offer of surrender from the Japanese within 24 hours. Although the B-29 was shaken by the detonation, they proceeded to the emergency field and landed with fuel tanks virtually empty. Commander Ashworth distinguished himself by his high degree of skill in directing work with the atomic bomb, the great personal risk he took in placing the powder charge in the bomb during flight and attack despite unfavorable conditions. His actions reflect great credit on himself and the United States Naval Service.

He was also awarded the Legion of Merit. His citation read:

The President of the United States of America takes pleasure in presenting the Legion of Merit to Commander Frederick Lincoln Ashworth (NSN: 0-72354), United States Navy, for exceptionally meritorious conduct in the performance of outstanding services to the Government of the United States in connection with the development of the greatest military weapon of all time, the atomic bomb. Joining the Atomic Bomb Project in November 1944, Commander Ashworth was assigned the duties of supervising and coordinating field tests in which facsimiles of the weapon were dropped from B-29 aircraft. Thoroughly understanding the principles and functions of intricate and complicated mechanisms, he was able to make sure that no time was wasted and the maximum information gained, both as to the components and as to the technique of delivery. Serving with intelligence, resourcefulness and devotion to duty, Commander Ashworth inspired the full confidence of all of the organizations and individuals concerned in the tests and insured the complete cooperation which was essential to achieve results in the time available. As a result of his successful fulfillment of this exacting and important assignment, he acted as representative of General Groves in the historic deliver of the second atomic bomb on Nagasaki, 9 August 1945. Commander Ashworth's leadership, professional skill and distinctive performance of duty throughout the test and development of this project were in keeping with the highest traditions of the United States Naval Service.

Ashworth was awarded a second Legion of Merit for Operation Crossroads in 1946. His citation read:

The President of the United States of America takes pleasure in presenting a Gold Star in lieu of a Second Award of the Legion of Merit to Captain Frederick Lincoln Ashworth (NSN: 0-72354), United States Navy, for exceptionally meritorious conduct in the performance of outstanding services to the Government of the United States as Chief of Staff to Commander Task Group 1.1, Joint Task Force ONE, during the period 7 February 1946 to 31 October 1946. With outstanding initiative, vision and professional ability, Captain Ashworth participated in the organization of both the military and technical staff of Joint Task Force ONE from its inception. He also made major contributions to the basic planning of the operation including the selection of Bikini Atoll as the site of the tests. As the operations proceeded Captain Ashworth's knowledge, background, initiative and good judgment enabled him to make major contributions to the effective coordination of the work of diverse military and civilian groups, particularly those involved in the preparation and air and underwater deliver of the atomic bombs. His outstanding service and performance of duty were at all times in keeping with the highest traditions of the United States Naval Service.

=== Post-war career ===
Ashworth remained in the navy after the war. He served on the staff of the Atomic Energy Commission's Division of Military Applications from 1952 to 1954. He was Commandant of Midshipmen at the United States Naval Academy in 1958, and headed the Atomic Energy Division for the Chief of Naval Operations from 1958 to 1960.

Promoted to vice admiral in May 1966, Ashworth served as commander of the United States Sixth Fleet from September 1966 to April 1967, for which he was awarded a Navy Distinguished Service Medal. From April 1967 to September 1968, he was Deputy Commander in Chief, U.S. Atlantic Fleet, and as chief of staff to the Commander in Chief Atlantic, Commander in Chief U.S. Atlantic Fleet and Commander in Chief Western Atlantic Area, for which he was awarded a second Navy Distinguished Service Medal. He retired in September 1968 with the rank of vice admiral.

== Retirement and death ==
Frederick L. Ashworth lived for over three decades in Santa Fe, New Mexico. He and his first wife divorced in 1990, and he remarried. He died on 3 December 2005 at Arizona Heart Hospital in Phoenix, Arizona, while undergoing heart surgery, and was buried in the Santa Fe National Cemetery. He was survived by his second wife, Ercie Bell Ashworth, and his sons Frederick Jr., David and Stephen.

== Decorations ==

Naval Aviator Badge
1st Row	Navy Distinguished Service Medal with Gold Star		
2nd Row	Silver Star	Legion of Merit with Gold Star	Distinguished Flying Cross
3rd Row	Bronze Star Medal with "V" Device	Joint Service Commendation Medal	Navy Unit Commendation
4th Row	American Defense Service Medal	American Campaign Medal	Asiatic-Pacific Campaign Medal with four service stars
5th Row	World War II Victory Medal	China Service Medal	National Defense Service Medal with service star
