= Jacob Beser =

US Air Force officer (1921-1992)

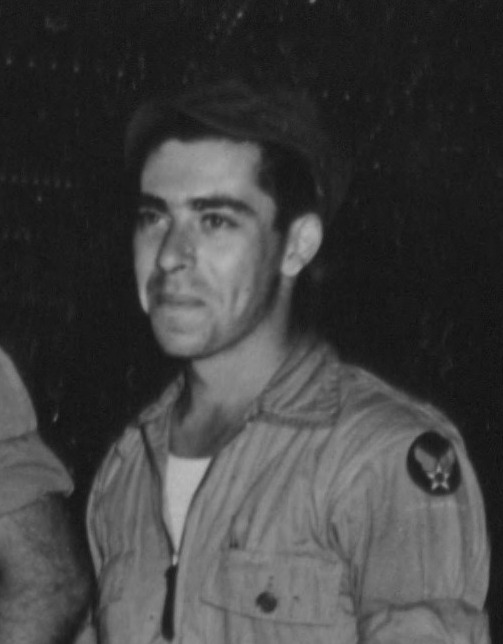
- Beser in August 1945
- Born: May 15, 1921; Baltimore, Maryland, US
- Died: June 17, 1992 (aged 71); Pikesville, Maryland, US
- Burial place: Baltimore Hebrew Cemetery; Baltimore, Maryland
- Military career
- Allegiance: United States
- Branch: United States Army Air Forces
- Service years: 1942–1945
- Rank: First Lieutenant
- Unit: 509th Composite Group
- Conflicts: World War II: Atomic bombings of Hiroshima and Nagasaki
- Awards: Silver Star; Distinguished Flying Cross; Air Medal

Jacob Beser (May 15, 1921 – June 17, 1992) was a lieutenant in the United States Army Air Forces who served during World War II. Beser was the radar specialist aboard the Enola Gay on August 6, 1945, when it dropped the Little Boy atomic bomb on Hiroshima. Three days later, Beser would become a crewmember aboard Bockscar when the Fat Man bomb was dropped on Nagasaki. He was the only person to have served as a strike crew member of both of the 1945 atomic bomb missions.

== Background ==
Jacob Beser grew up in Baltimore, Maryland. He attended the Baltimore City College (high school) and graduated in June 1938. Beser then studied mechanical engineering at The Johns Hopkins University, also in Baltimore, but dropped out the day after the attack on Pearl Harbor to enlist in the Army Air Forces. He was Jewish and extremely restless to get into the fight against Hitler.

Because of his training and educational background, Beser was sent to Los Alamos and worked on the Manhattan Project in the area of weapons firing and fusing. There, he met or worked with various luminaries such as Robert B. Brode, Norman Ramsey, Niels Bohr, Enrico Fermi, Edward Doll, and General Leslie Groves.

== Mission ==
The 509th Composite Group, which Beser served in, was the army unit tasked with deploying the atomic bombs. To practice for the mission, they used practice bombs called "pumpkins", designed to be similar to the Fat Man atomic bomb. The unit began training on December 17, 1944, at the Wendover Army Air Field in Utah, before being deployed to the island of Tinian in May 1945. The unit's First Ordnance Squadron was responsible for handling the bombs.

On August 6, 1945, the first atomic bomb to be used in combat was dropped by a B-29 Superfortress bomber, the Enola Gay, over the Japanese city of Hiroshima, killing 70,000 people, including 20,000 Japanese combatants and 20,000 Korean slave laborers. The thirteen-hour mission to Hiroshima, under the command of pilot Colonel Paul Tibbets, began at 0245 Tinian time. By the time the Enola Gay rendezvoused with its two accompanying B-29 Superfortresses at 0607 over Iwo Jima, the group was three hours from the target area. "Little Boy's" detonation was triggered by radar sensors on the bomb that measured its altitude as it fell. Beser's job was to monitor those sensors and ensure that there was no interference that could have detonated it prematurely. The bomb fell away from the aircraft at 09:15:17 Tinian time. Beser did not watch the bomb detonate but he heard the bomb's radar signals switch on and then cut off at the moment the intense light generated by its detonation filled the plane.

Three days later, in a second B-29 Superfortress bomber, Bockscar, Beser repeated this task over Nagasaki with Fat Man, the plutonium implosion bomb that became the second and last atomic bomb used in combat. Beser was the only crew member to accompany both atomic bomb missions, and along with the commanding officers/pilots, had a scientific understanding of the new weapons' potential and destructiveness, as a result of his earlier high school and university education.

== Later life ==
In 1946, Beser was one of the founding members of Sandia National Laboratories, in New Mexico. He came home to Baltimore and in the mid-1950s began a long career working on defense projects for Westinghouse.

Beser was asked about his atomic bomb missions in numerous interviews, and responded like the following:

For years I have been asked two questions. (1) Would you do it again? (2) Do you feel any guilt for having been a part of Hiroshima's destruction?

One has to consider the context of the times in which decisions are made. Given the same set of circumstances as existed in 1945, I would not hesitate to take part in another similar mission.

No I feel no sorrow or remorse for whatever small role I played. That I should is crazy. I remember Pearl Harbor and all of the Japanese atrocities. I remember the shock to our nation that all of this brought. I don't want to hear any discussion of morality. War, by its very nature, is immoral. Are you any more dead from an atomic bomb than from a conventional bomb?

He wrote a book about the experiences of participating in both flights; Hiroshima & Nagasaki Revisited was written in 1988.

Beser was an amateur ("ham") radio operator, holding the callsign W3NOD.

He was inducted into the "Hall of Fame" of his alma mater high school, Baltimore City College, the third oldest public high school in America.

== Military decorations ==
His decorations include:

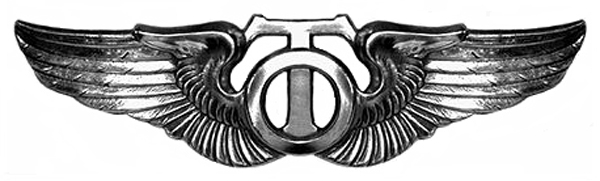

USAAF Technical Observer Badge
Silver Star
Distinguished Flying Cross	Air Medal	Air Force Outstanding Unit Award with "V" device
American Campaign Medal	Asiatic-Pacific Campaign Medal with bronze campaign star	World War II Victory Medal

=== Silver Star citation ===
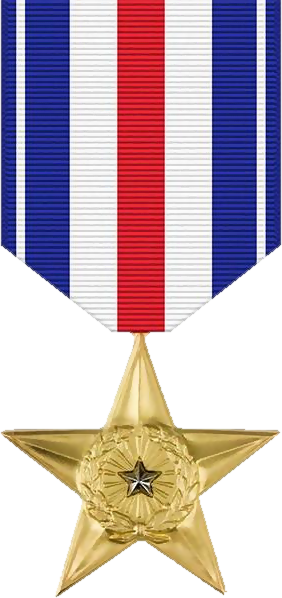

Beser, Jacob
First Lieutenant, U.S Army Air Forces
393d Bombardment Squadron, 509th Composite Group, 20th Air Force
Date of Action: August 6, 1945
Headquarters, 20th Air Force, General Orders No. 69 (September 22, 1945)
Citation:

Captain (Air Corps) Jacob Beser (ASN: 0-66), United States Army Air Forces, for gallantry in action while engaged in aerial flight against the Japanese Empire on 6 August 1945. Lieutenant Beser was the Radar Countermeasures Officer for a combat crew of the B-29 aircraft of the 393d Bombardment Squadron, 509th Composite Group, 20th Air Force, which flew from a base in the Marianas Islands to drop on the city of Hiroshima, Japan, the first atomic bomb to be used in warfare. Flying 1500 miles over open water to the coast of Japan, they manned their assigned positions and crossed the island of Shikoku and the Inland Sea. They constantly faced the danger of being hit by anti-aircraft fire, enemy fighters, or suffering mechanical or other failures which would intensify the risks of carrying this powerful missile. Throughout the mission the element of hazard from the unknown prevailed, for this was the first time that this bomb, much more destructive than any other in existence, had been dropped from an airplane. The effect it would have on the airplane and these crew members was only to be estimated. Shortly after 0900 they brought the plane in over the city, and at 0915 the bomb release was pressed. The bomb cleared, and fell toward the planned objective. They then headed from the area and, despite a minor effect from the detonation, returned safely to their home base. By their courage and skillful performance of duty achieved in outstanding fashion despite the dangers involved in accomplishment of this historic mission, these individuals distinguished themselves by extraordinary achievement and reflect great credit on themselves and the Army Air Forces.

== See also ==
- Tsutomu Yamaguchi – the only survivor acknowledged by the Japanese government to have been on the ground during both nuclear detonations in combat (the Asahi Shimbun located 160 dual-bomb survivors, total).
