= Kaoru =

- Pronunciation: [kaoɾɯ]
- Gender: Unisex
- Language: Japanese

Origin
- Origin: Japanese
- Meaning: Fragrance

Other names
- Variant form: Kaori

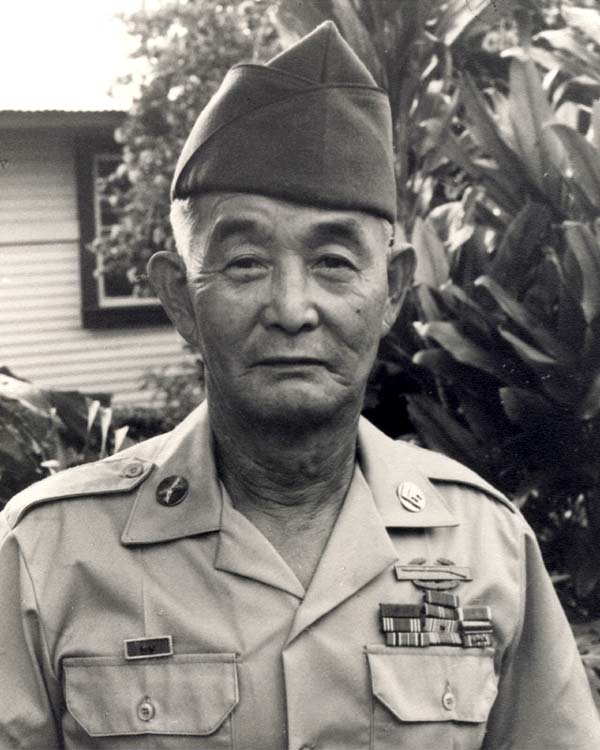
Medal of Honor recipient Kaoru Moto

Kaoru is a Japanese given name for males and females.

== Name Meanings ==
The name's meaning varies depending on its written form:

- 薫/郁 — "fragrance", common for both males and females
- 馨/香 — "fragrance", more common for females
- かおる — purely phonetic form in hiragana; no inherent meaning
- かをる — same as above, using を as an archaic substitute for お
- カオル — phonetic form in katakana

As a distinctly unisex name, its usage in popular culture has risen in recent years to give the named character an air of androgyny. Such characters commonly have overt androgynous qualities as well.

A similar name, in terms of both pronunciation and meaning, is Kaori. It is used exclusively for females.

== People ==
- Kaoru 薫 (m) (one of the guitarists of Dir En Grey)
- Kaoru Abe 阿部薫 (m) (free Jazz saxophonist)
- Kaoru Adachi (安達 かおる; born 1956), Japanese film director, producer and editor
- Kaoru Akimoto (秋元薫) Born: 1964, Japanese singer-songwriter.She was also a vocalist for the band SHAMBARA. She was discovered while participating as a backup vocalist for Matsutoya Yumi's live tour in 1983.
- Kaoru Fujino (かほる), voice actor
- Kaoru Fukuda (福田 薫; born 1955), Japanese speed skater
- Kaoru Hasuike 薫 (m) (academic, writer, translator, and Japanese national once abducted by North Korea)
- Kaoru Hatoyama (1888–1982), Japanese educator
- Kaoru Ide, Japanese architect
- Kaoru Ikeya 薫 (m) (astronomer)
- Kaoru Inoue 馨 (m) (statesman)
- Kaoru Ishibashi (m) (musician, Kishi Bashi)
- Kaoru Ishikawa (m) (business theorist, developer of the Ishikawa diagram)
- Kaoru Kakizakai (柿堺 香; born 1959), Japanese musician
- Kaoru Kurimoto (1953–2009), Japanese novelist
- Kaoru Kobayashi (m) (actor)
- Kaoru Maeda 薫 (f) (professional wrestler)
- Kaoru Matsuo (松尾 薫; born 1951), Japanese sport shooter
- Kaoru Mitoma (m), Japanese footballer
- Kaoru Mori 薫 (f) (manga author)
- Kaoru Onimaru (鬼丸 かおる; born 1949), Japanese lawyer and judge
- Kaoru Otsuki (1888–1970), Japanese politician
- Kaoru Shima (島薫, 1897–1977), Japanese physician
- Kaoru Shimamura (嶋村 カオル; 1969–2013), Japanese voice actress
- Kaoru Sugayama かおる (f) (volleyball player)
- Kaoru Sugiyama (杉山 薫; born 2003), Japanese female badminton player
- Kaoru Tada (1960–1999), Japanese manga artist
- Kaoru Takamura (髙村 薫; born 1953), Japanese novelist and essayist
- Kaoru Takayama (高山 薫; born 1988), Japanese footballer
- Kaoru Uno 薫 (m) (mixed martial artist)
- Kaoru Usui 薫 (m) (photographer)
- Kaoru Kimura (f) Japanese astronomy educator; President, International Planetarium Society 2021-22
- Kaoru Wada 薫 (m) (composer)
- Kaoru Wakabayashi (若林 薫; born 1938), Japanese basketball player
- Kaoru Yachigusa (1931–2019), Japanese actress
- Kaoru Yosano 馨 (m) (politician)

== Fictional characters ==
- Kaoru (f) - Rilakkuma and Kaoru
- Kaoru Toki 時 カオル (f) - Seitokai Yakuindomo
- Kaoru (m) - Uninhabited Planet Survive!
- Kaoru Akashi (f) - Zettai Karen Children
- Kaoru (f) - Daughter of Smoke and Bone
- Kaoru Amane 薫 (f) - Taiyou no Uta
- Kaoru Asahina (m) - Junjo Romantica
- Fujiwara no Kaoru a.k.a. Murasaki Shikibu (m) - Akane-sasu Sekai de Kimi to Utau
- Kaoru Genji 薫 (m) - Tale of Genji
- Kaoru Gojo (m) - My Dress-Up Darling
- Kaoru Hakaze 羽風薫 (m) - Ensemble Stars!
- Kaoru Hanano (f) - Crush Gear Turbo
- Kaoru Hanabishi (m) - Ai Yori Aoshi
- Karou "Hanazono" (m) - The 100 Girlfriends Who Really, Really, Really, Really, Really Love You
- Kaoru Hitachiin 馨 (m) - Ouran High School Host Club
- Kaoru Hondobou (m) - Gyakuten Saiban 3
- Kaoru Ichihara 壱原かおる (f) - Mahou No Princess Club! De Javu!
- Kaoru Ichijo 薫 (m) - Kamen Rider Kuuga
- Kaoru Kaidoh 薫 (m) - Prince of Tennis
- Kaoru Kameyama (m) - Aibō
- Kaoru Kamiya 薫 (f) - Rurouni Kenshin
- Kaoru Kirishima (m) - Our Two Bedroom Love Story
- Kaoru Kiryuu 薫 (f) - Futari wa Pretty Cure Splash Star
- Kaoru Kiryūin (m) - Moero! Nekketsu Rhythm Damashii Osu! Tatakae! Ouendan 2
- Kaoru Kishimoto 薫 (m) - Hikaru no Go
- Kaoru Koganei 薰 (m) - Flame of Recca
- Kaoru Kondo (f) - Saido Kā ni Inu
- Kaoru Kumada (熊) - Kiteretsu Daihyakka
- Kaoru Kurusu (m) - Uta no Prince-Sama
- Kaoru Maki カオル (f) - Puella Magi Kazumi Magica
- Kaoru Matoba 薫 (m) - Area no Kishi
- Kaoru Matsubara 松原かおる (f) - Demashita! Powerpuff Girls Z
- Kaoru Matsutake 香 (m) - Mirmo!
- Kaoru Mido (f) - Tsukuyomi: Moon Phase
- Kaoru Mitarai (f) - Pita Ten
- Kaworu Nagisa 渚カヲル (m) - Neon Genesis Evangelion
- Kaoru Nagumo (m) - Hakuouki
- Kaoru Ōba (Wendy Oldbag) (f) - Phoenix Wright: Ace Attorney
- Kaoru Orihara (also known as "Kaoru-no-kimi") (f) - Oniisama e...
- Kaoru Ryuzaki 龍崎薫 (f) - The Idolmaster Cinderella Girls
- Kaoru Saionji (m) - Gakuen Heaven
- Kaoru Saegusa (f) -Tokusou Robo Janperson
- Kaoru Sakuraba (m) - The Idolmaster SideM
- Kaoru Sakurayashiki (m) - SK8 the Infinity
- Kaoru Sakurazuka (m) - Yin-Yang! X-Change Alternative
- Kaoru Sasakura (f) -Marumo no Okite
- Kaoru Sayama (f) -Yakuza 2 & Yakuza 3
- Kaoru Seo (m) - Sekirei
- Kaoru Seta 瀬田薫 (f) - BanG Dream!
- Kaoru Shiba (f) - Samurai Sentai Shinkenger
- Kaoru Sugimura (m) - Nana to Kaoru
- Kaoru Tsukishita (m) - Holostars
- Kaoru Watabe (f) - King of Fighters 97
- Kaoru Yamazaki 山崎 薫 (m) - Welcome to the NHK

All names (except for Fujiwara no Kaoru and Kamiya Kaoru) are in western naming order.

== See also ==
- Kaworu
- Japanese names
