= Kaori =

- Pronunciation: [kaoɾi]
- Gender: Female

Origin
- Origin: Japanese
- Region of origin: Japan

Other names
- Variant form: Kaoru

Kaori (香織 "scent/aroma, fabric/weave" and occasionally rendered "perfume", かおり [kaoɾi]) is a feminine Japanese given name. Notable people with the name include:

- Kaori (voice actress) (かおり; born 1976), Japanese voice actress and singer
- Kaori Aoba (青葉 かおり; born 1978), Japanese female professional 5 dan Go player
- Kaori Asada (浅田 香織; born 1973), Japanese musician known as Bonnie Pink
- Kaori Asoh (麻生 かほ里; born 1967), Japanese voice actress and theatre actress
- Kaori Chiba (千葉 香織; born 1981), Japanese field hockey player
- Kaori Chinen (知念 かおり; born 1974), Japanese Go player
- Kaori Ekuni (江國 香織; born 1964), Japanese author
- Kaori Fujima (藤間 香織; born 1982), Japanese handball goalkeeper
- Kaori Fujino (藤野 可織; born 1980), Japanese writer
- Kaori Fukuhara (福原 香織; born 1986), Japanese voice actress
- Kaori Futenma (普天間 かおり; born 1973), Japanese singer-songwriter, radio personality, philanthropist and goodwill ambassador
- Kaori Hamura (葉村 かおり; born 1986), Japanese artist and illustrator
- Kaori Hasegawa (長谷川 歌織; born 1972), Japanese singer
- Kaori Housako (宝迫 香織; born 1988), Japanese professional wrestler
- Kaori Icho (伊調 馨; born 1984), Japanese sport wrestler
- Kaori Iida (飯田 圭織; born 1981), Japanese musician and former Morning Musume member
- Kaori Imabeppu (今別府 香里; born 1986), Japanese badminton player, who is a singles specialist
- Kaori Inoue (井上 香織; born 1982), Japanese volleyball player
- Kaori Ishibashi (石橋 かおり; born 1962), Japanese confectionery researcher and baking instructor
- Kaori Ishihara (石原 夏織; born 1993), Japanese idol, actress, voice actress and singer
- Kaori Ishikawa (石川 かおり; born 1984), Japanese member of the Constitutional Democratic Party
- Kaori Ito (伊藤 郁女; born 1979), Japanese dancer and choreographer
- Kaori Iwabuchi (岩渕 香里; born 1993), Japanese ski jumper
- Kaori Iwasaki (岩崎 香; born 1969), Japanese swimmer
- Kaori Kato (born 1977), Japanese women cricketer
- Kaori Kawamura (川村 カオリ; 1971–2009), Japanese rock and pop singer
- Kaori Kawanaka (川中 香緒里; born 1991), Japanese archer
- Kaori Kawazoe (河添 香織; born 1995), Japanese racewalking athlete
- Kaori Kishitani (岸谷 香; born 1967), Japanese musician and singer-songwriter
- Kaori Kobayashi (小林 香織; born 1981), Japanese jazz saxophonist, pianist and flautist
- Kaori Kodaira (小平 花織; born 1990), Japanese volleyball player
- Kaori Kozai (香西 かおり; born 1963), Japanese enka singer
- Kaori Kusuda (楠田 香穂里; born 1974), Japanese former basketball player
- Kaori Maeda (前田 かおり; born 1990), Japanese pornographic actress
- Kaori Maeda (前田 佳織里; born 1996), Japanese voice actress
- Kaori Manabe (眞鍋 かをり; born 1980), Japanese talent, gravure idol and actress
- Kaori Maruya (丸谷 佳織; born 1965), Japanese politician
- Kaori Matsumoto (松本 薫; born 1987), Japanese judoka
- Kaori Matsumura (松村 香織; born 1990), Japanese tarento
- Kaori Mizuhashi (水橋 かおり; born 1974), Japanese voice actress
- Kaori Mizumori (水森 かおり; born 1973), Japanese enka singer
- Kaori Mochida (持田香織; born 1978), Japanese singer and vocalist of Every Little Thing
- Kaori Momoi (桃井かおり; born 1952), Japanese actress
- Kaori Mori (森 かおり; born 1979), Japanese former badminton player
- Kaori Morita (森田 香織; born 1995), Japanese long-distance runner
- Kaori Moritani (守谷 香; born 1969), Japanese singer
- Kaori Moriwaka (森若 香織; born 1963), Japanese musician and former member of The Go-Bang's and Ram Jam World
- Kaori Moriyama (森山 かおり; born 1963), Japanese retired judo wrestler
- Kaori Muraji (村治 佳織; born 1978), Japanese classical guitarist
- Kaori Nagamine (長峯 かおり; born 1968), Japanese former football player
- Kaori Nakayama (中山 香里; born 1978), Japanese retired professional wrestler
- Kaori Nanao (七緒 香; born 1976), Japanese singer
- Kaori Natori (名取 香り; born 1982), Japanese singer
- Kaori Nazuka (名塚 佳織; born 1985), Japanese voice actress
- Kaori Niyanagi (二柳 かおり; born 1977), Japanese female weightlifter
- Kaori O'Connor (1945–2022), a social anthropologist and writer
- Kaori Oda (織田 かおり; born 1988), Japanese pop singer
- Kaori Oguri (小栗 香織; born 1970), actress
- Kaori Oinuma (老沼 カオリ; born 2000), Japanese-Filipina actress
- Kaori Onozawa (小野澤 香理; born 1979), Japanese handball player
- Kaori Sadohara (佐土原 かおり; born 1988), Japanese voice actress and singer
- Kaori Sakagami (坂上 香織; born 1974), Japanese former singer and actress
- Kaori Sakagami (athlete) (坂上 香織; born 1974), Japanese retired sprinter
- Kaori Sakamoto (坂本 花織; born 2000), Japanese figure skater
- Kaori Sasaki (佐々木 香織; born 1971), Japanese former swimmer
- Kaori Shimamura (嶋村 かおり; born 1971), Japanese nude model, gravure idol, television personality and actress
- Kaori Shimizu (清水 香里; born 1983), Japanese voice actress
- Kaori Takagi (高木 かおり; born 1972), Japanese politician
- Kaori Takahashi (synchronised swimmer) (高橋 馨; born 1974), Japanese synchronized swimmer
- Kaori Takahashi (actress) (高橋 かおり; born 1975), Japanese actress
- Kaori Takeyama (born 1972), Japanese snowboarder
- Kaori Tanaka (田中 香; born 1969), Japanese freelance illustrator, designer, and video game story writer
- Kaori Tsuchida, former member of The Go! Team
- Kaori Uekawa (上川 香織; born 1974), Japanese shogi player
- Kaori Utatsuki (詩月 カオリ), Japanese J-pop singer
- Kaori Yamaguchi (山口 香; born 1964), Japanese retired judoka
- Kaori Yanase (簗瀬 かおり; born 1967), Japanese swimmer
- Kaori Yoneyama (米山香織; born 1981), Japanese professional wrestler
- Kaori Yoshida (吉田 香織; born 1981), Japanese long-distance runner and marathon athlete
- Kaori Yuki (由貴香織里), manga artist

== Fictional characters ==
- Kaori (Akira), Tetsuo Shima's girlfriend in the film Akira
- Kaori, a character in the manga and anime series Azumanga Daioh
- Kaori, Rin Hojo's arranged fiance in the manga and anime series Initial D
- Kaori Hasegawa, a character in Corpse Party
- Kaori Itadori, the mother of Yuuji Itadori in the manga Jujutsu Kaisen
- Kaori Itami, a character in ACE Academy
- Kaori Itami, a character in ACE Academy
- Kaori Izumi, a character in the manga and anime Best Student Council
- Kaori Kanzaki, a character from the visual novel and franchise A Certain Magical Index
- Kaori Kuromine, a.k.a. Kaolinite/Kaorinite, one of the main antagonists in the 3rd Arc/season of Bishōjo Senshi Sailor Moon Manga.
- Kaori Kinjo, a minor character in the Blood+ anime
- Kaori Makimura, Ryo Saeba's love interest in the manga and anime City Hunter
- Kaori Miyazono, a main character from the manga and anime series Your Lie in April
- Kaori Minami, a character in Battle Royale
- Kaori Nishidake, a character in the video game franchise SSX
- Kaori Rokumeikan, a character in Choujin Sentai Jetman
- Kaori Saito, a character in the manga Ice Blade (Jiraishin)
- Kaori Sakuragi, a character in the manga and anime Strawberry Panic!
- Kaori Shirasaki, a character in Arifureta
- Kaori Suzumeda, a manager of Fukurodani in Haikyū!!
- Kaori Tachibana, a character from Whisper Me a Love Song
- Kaori Tanaka, a supporting character in Shiki
- Kaori Yanase (Variable Geo), a character in the Variable Geo video games

== See also ==
- Kaoru (disambiguation)
- Agathis, also known as kauri, an evergreen genus
