= Hypocenter =

Origin point beneath an air explosion

A hypocenter or hypocentre, also called ground zero or surface zero, is the point on the Earth's surface directly below a nuclear explosion, meteor air burst, or other mid-air explosion. In seismology, the hypocenter of an earthquake is its point of origin below ground; a synonym is the focus of an earthquake.

Generally, the terms ground zero and surface zero are also used in relation to epidemics and other disasters to mark the point of the most severe damage or destruction. The term is distinguished from the term zero point in that the latter can also be located in the air, underground, or underwater.

== Nuclear explosions ==
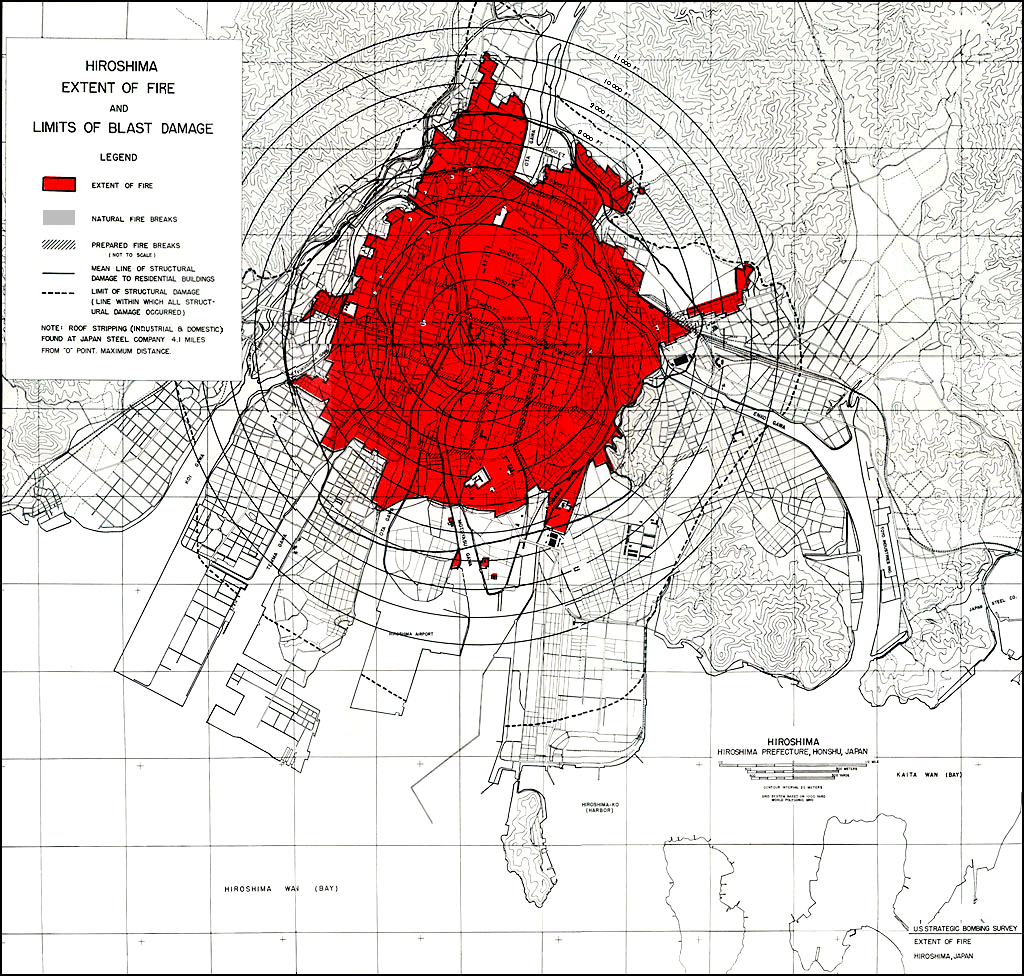
In mapping the effects of an atomic bomb, such as on the city of Hiroshima here, concentric circles are drawn centered on the point below the detonation and numbered at radial distances of 1,000 feet (305 meters). This point below the detonation is called "Ground Zero".

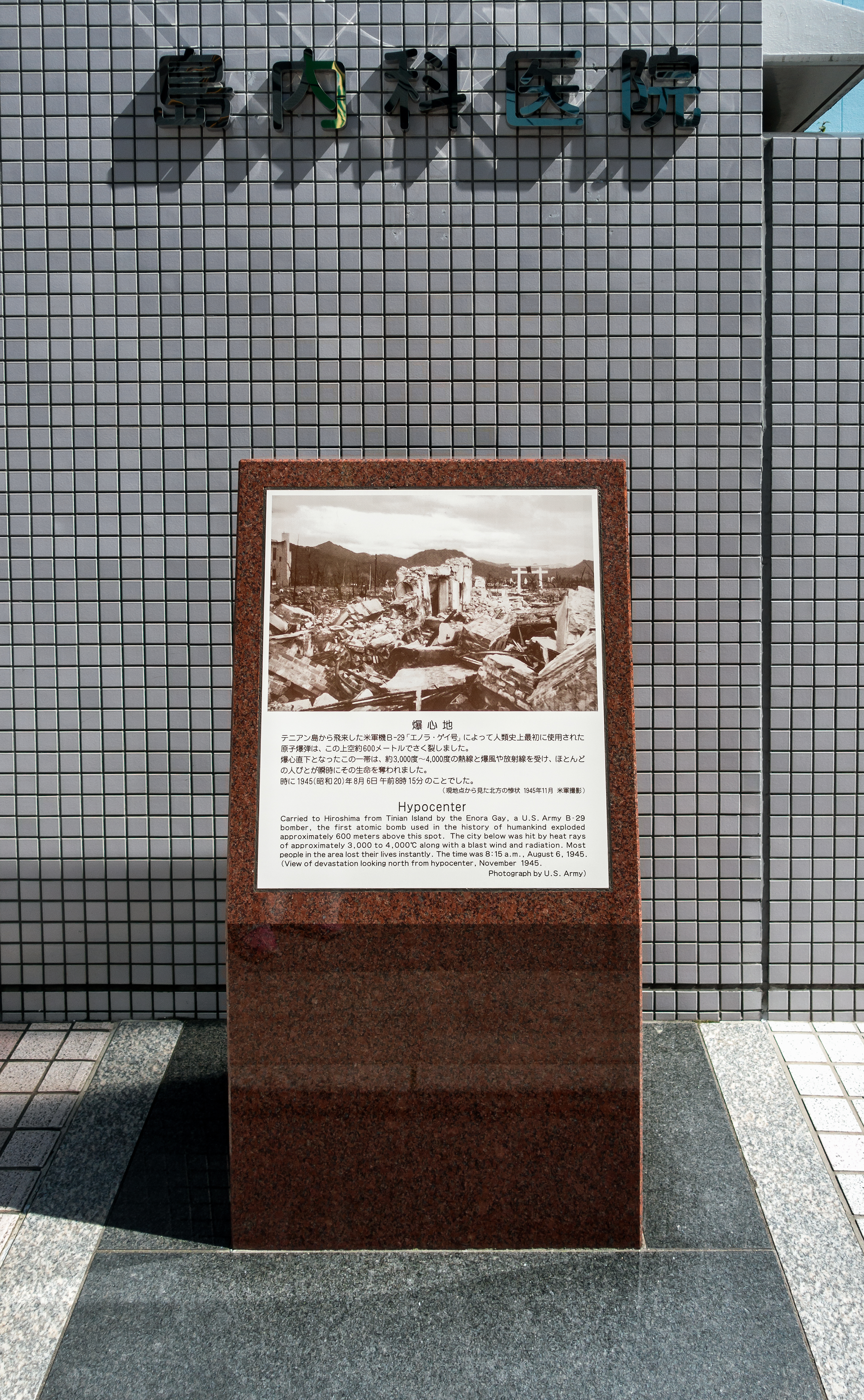
Monument marking the hypocenter, or ground zero, of the atomic bomb explosion over Hiroshima.

The term "ground zero" originally referred to the hypocenter of the Trinity test in Jornada del Muerto desert near Socorro, New Mexico, and the atomic bombings of Hiroshima and Nagasaki in Japan. The United States Strategic Bombing Survey of the atomic attacks, released in June 1946, used the term liberally, defining it as:

For convenience, the term 'ground zero' will be used to designate the point on the ground directly beneath the point of detonation, or 'air zero.'

William Laurence, an embedded reporter with the Manhattan Project, reported that "Zero" was "the code name given to the spot chosen for the [Trinity] test" in 1945.

The Oxford English Dictionary, citing the use of the term in a 1946 New York Times report on the destroyed city of Hiroshima, defines ground zero as "that part of the ground situated immediately under an exploding bomb, especially an atomic one." The term was military slang, used at the Trinity site where the weapon tower for the first nuclear weapon was at "point zero", and moved into general use very shortly after the end of World War II.

At Hiroshima, the hypocenter of the attack was Shima Hospital, approximately 800 ft (240 m) away from the intended aiming point at Aioi Bridge. At Nagasaki, the hypocenter of the attack was above Urakami Valley, approximately 4,200 ft (1,300 m) away from the intended aiming point at the Mitsubishi Steel and Arms Works.

=== The Pentagon ===
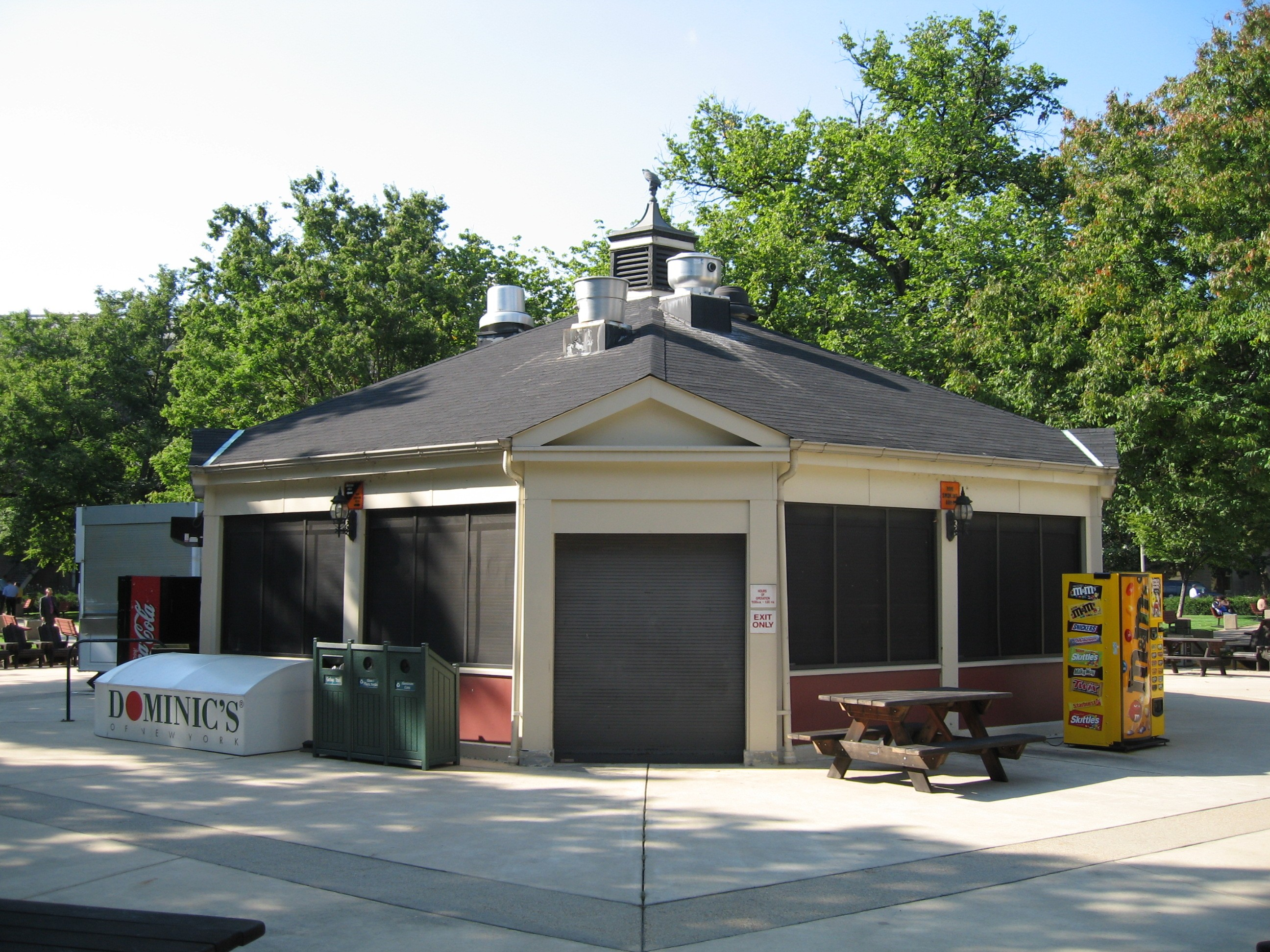
The former hot dog stand nicknamed Cafe Ground Zero in the Pentagon's center courtyard.

During the Cold War, the Pentagon (headquarters of United States Department of Defense in Arlington County, Virginia) was an assured target in the event of nuclear war. The open space in the center of the Pentagon became known informally as ground zero. A snack bar that used to be located at the center of this open space was nicknamed "Cafe Ground Zero".

== Meteor air bursts ==
The hypocenter of a meteor air burst, an asteroid or comet that explodes in the atmosphere rather than strike the surface, is the closest point on the surface to the explosion. The Tunguska event occurred in Siberia in 1908 and flattened an estimated 30 million trees over a 2,150 km^{2} (830 sq mi) area. The trees at the hypocenter of the blast were left standing, but all their limbs had been blown off by the shockwave. The 2013 Chelyabinsk meteor's hypocenter in Russia was more populated than that of Tunguska, resulting in civil damage and injury, mostly from flying glass shards from broken windows.

== Earthquakes ==
Hypocenter (Focus) and epicenter of an earthquake

An earthquake's hypocenter or focus is the position where the strain energy stored in the rock is first released, marking the point where the fault begins to rupture. This occurs directly beneath the epicenter, at a distance known as the hypocentral depth or focal depth.

The focal depth can be calculated from measurements based on seismic wave phenomena. As with all wave phenomena in physics, there is uncertainty in such measurements that grows with the wavelength so the focal depth of the source of these long-wavelength (low frequency) waves is difficult to determine exactly. Very strong earthquakes radiate a large fraction of their released energy in seismic waves with very long wavelengths and therefore a stronger earthquake involves the release of energy from a larger mass of rock.

Computing the hypocenters of foreshocks, main shock, and aftershocks of earthquakes allows the three-dimensional plotting of the fault along which movement is occurring. The expanding wavefront from the earthquake's rupture propagates at a speed of several kilometers per second; this seismic wave is what is measured at various surface points in order to geometrically determine an initial guess as to the hypocenter. The wave reaches each station based upon how far away it was from the hypocenter. A number of things need to be taken into account, most importantly variations in the waves speed based upon the materials that it is passing through. With adjustments for velocity changes, the initial estimate of the hypocenter is made, then a series of linear equations is set up, one for each station. The equations express the difference between the observed arrival times and those calculated from the initial estimated hypocenter. These equations are solved by the method of least squares which minimizes the sum of the squares of the differences between the observed and calculated arrival times, and a new estimated hypocenter is computed. The system iterates until the location is pinpointed within the margin of error for the velocity computations.

== See also ==
- List of meteor air bursts
- List of nuclear weapon explosion sites
- Tenet, a 2020 film that includes a sub-surface nuclear "hypocenter" in its storyline
- From Ground Zero
- World Trade Center site
