= Aioi Bridge =

Bridge in Hiroshima, Japan

Coordinates: 34.3964°N 132.4526°E

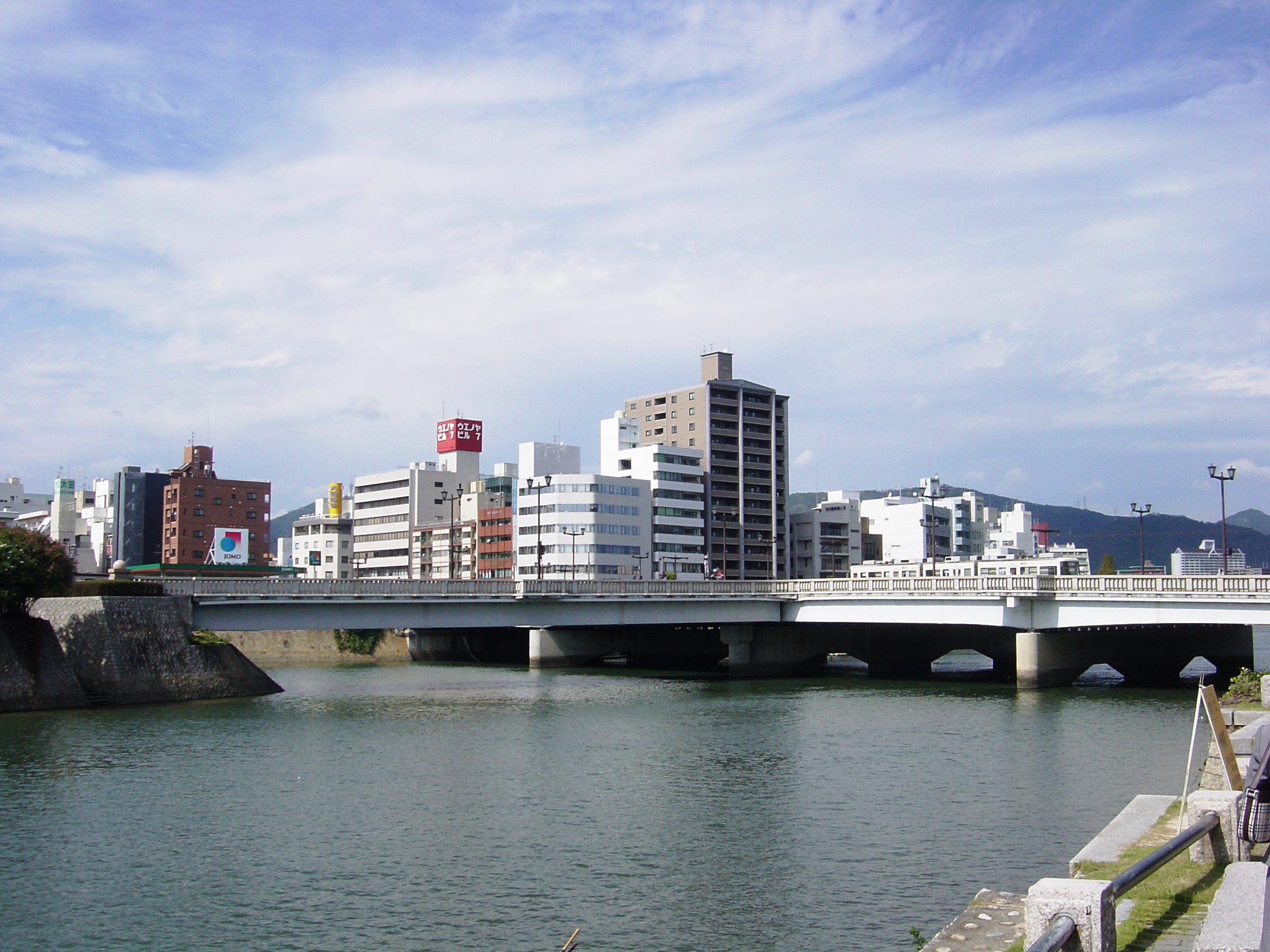
The 1983 Aioi Bridge

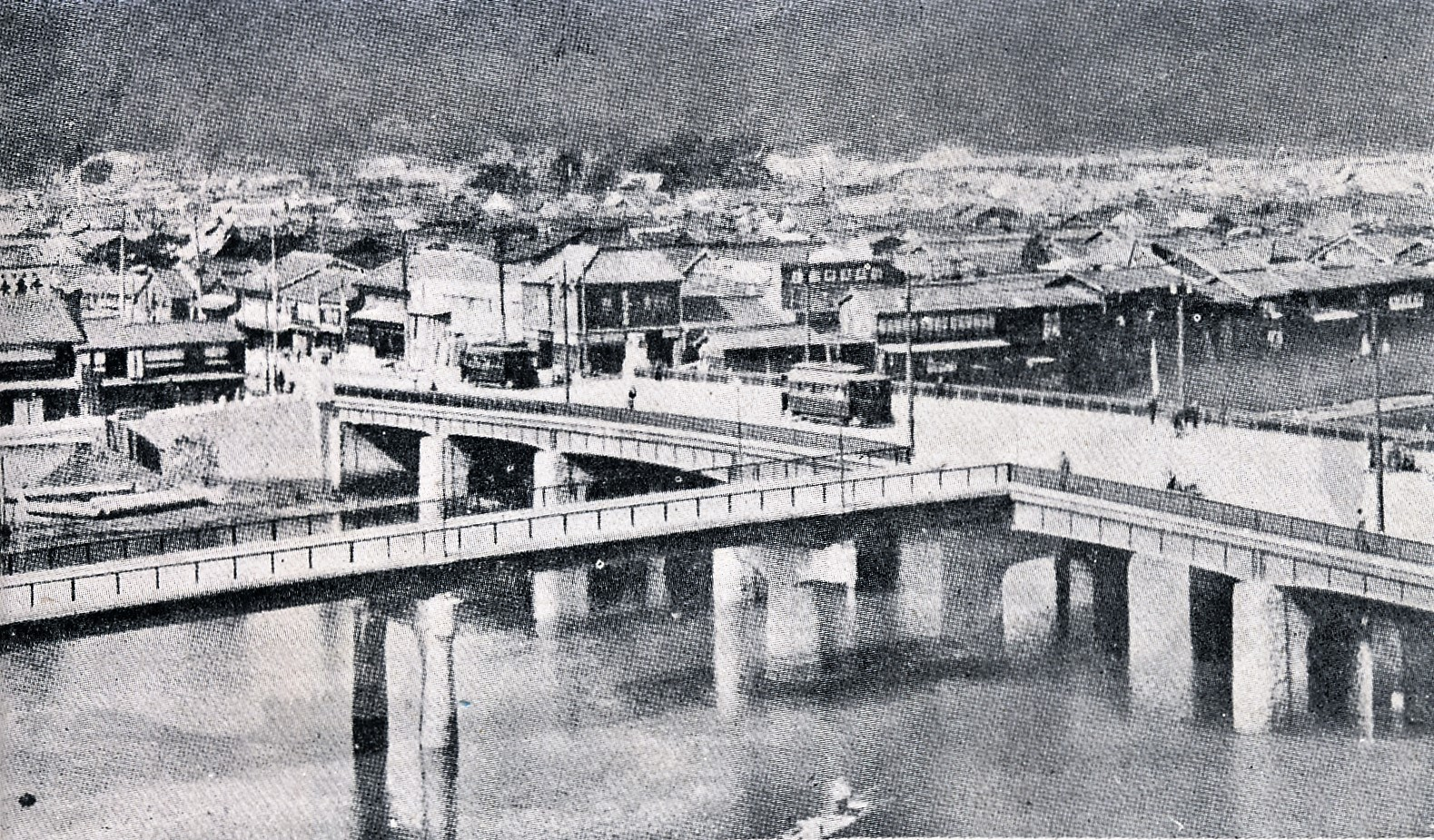
The original Aioi Bridge

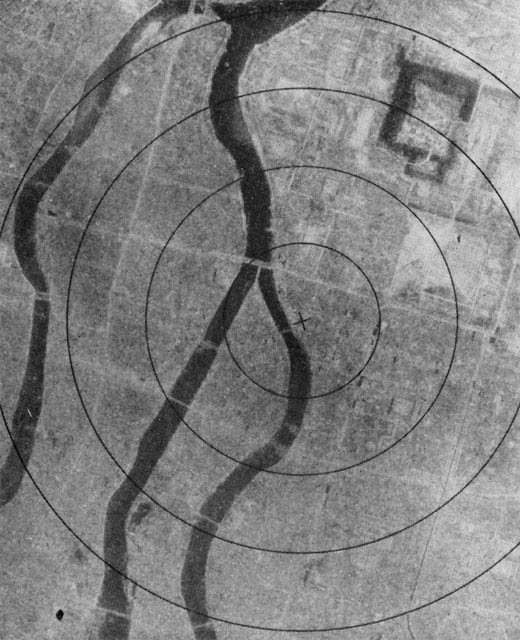
The area around ground zero after the Hiroshima bombing. The T-shaped Aioi Bridge is visible near the center.

The Aioi Bridge (相生橋, Aioi Bashi) is an unusual T-shaped three-way bridge in Hiroshima, Japan. The original bridge, constructed in 1932, was the aiming point for the 1945 Hiroshima atom bomb. This was both because its shape was easily recognized from the air, and its location was close to the city center. The current bridge was built in 1983 to a similar specification as the original. The name of the bridge comes from the fact that the two bridges "meet" one another.

== History ==
The bridge was built in 1932 for streetcars. It's approximately 120 meters in length and spans the Honkawa and Motoyasu rivers.

The Enola Gay targeted the bridge, releasing the bomb once it was within its sights. The bomb deviated from its intended target, missing the bridge horizontally by 240 meters and detonating over the Shima Hospital instead. While not destroyed by the atomic blast, the bridge sustained significant damage. Following the explosion, a person who survived the event described witnessing the Aioi Bridge being lifted several meters into the air, only to settle back down onto its foundation afterward.

After the war, the bridge was repaired and remained in service for nearly four decades before it was replaced in 1983 by a new bridge resembling the original. A surviving portion of a floor girder from the original bridge was subsequently donated to the Hiroshima Peace Memorial Museum.

The longer part of the bridge crosses the Ōta River just to the north of the island, containing the district of Nakajima-cho. The downstroke of the "T" links the main bridge to the island and is also the north entrance to the Hiroshima Peace Memorial Park.

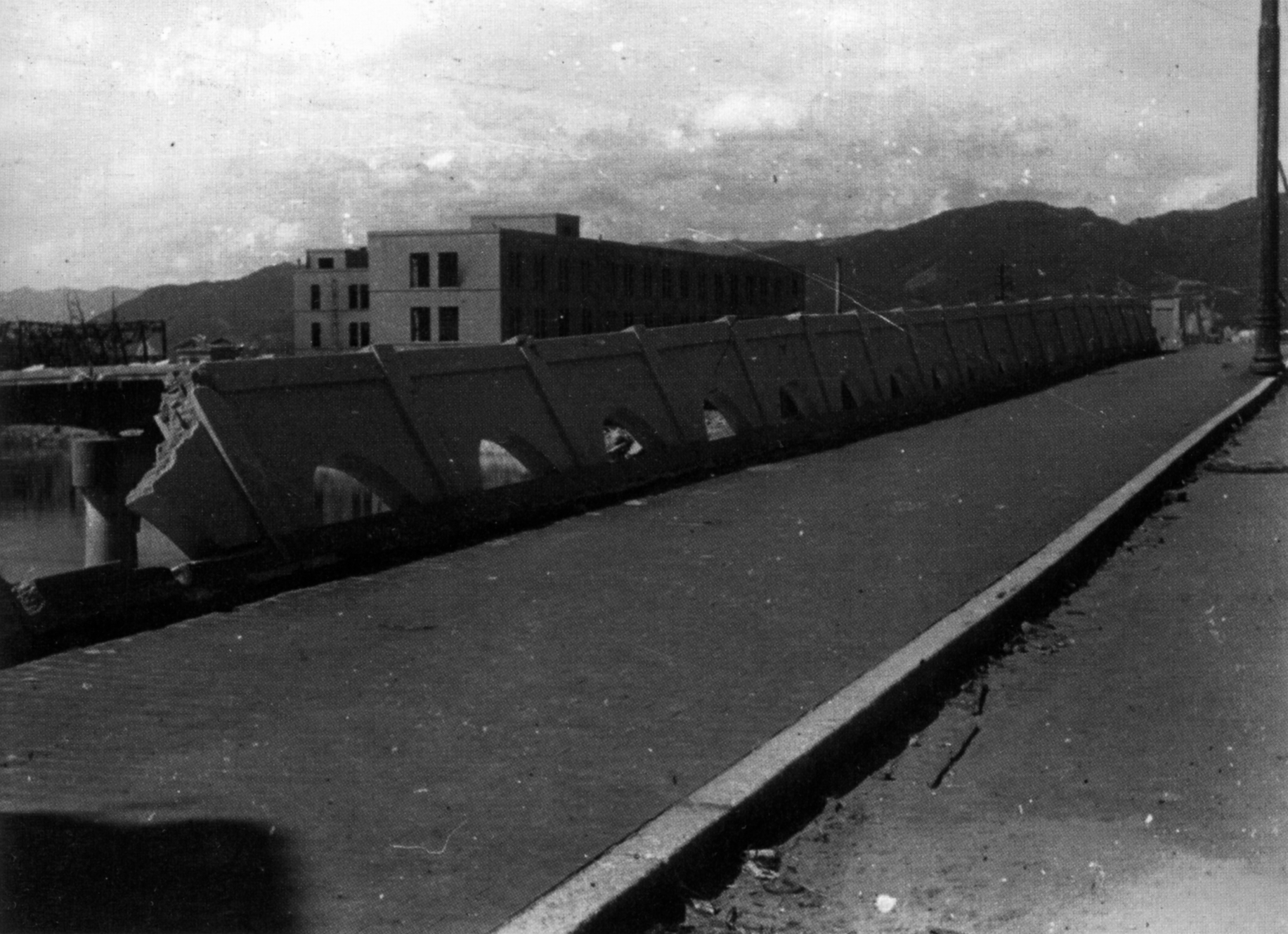
The railing of Aioi Bridge was bent over by the blast of the atomic bomb

=== Typhoon damage ===
At the time, there were six bridges (seven if in operation) near the hypocenter. These were hit by successive disasters: the atomic bomb in August of that year, the large Makurazaki typhoon in September, and the smaller Akune typhoon less than a month later. Of the major bridges in the city at the time, most that collapsed after the atomic bombing in August were wooden bridges destroyed by fires caused by the heat rays, and many more collapsed due to flooding caused by the typhoons that followed. As a result of this series of damage, Honkawa Bridge, Shin-Ohashi Bridge, and Sumiyoshi Bridge on the downstream side of the Honkawa River all collapsed. For a time, it was the bridge at the very bottom of the Honkawa River.

== Specifications ==
In the following section, the bridge will be referred to as the "combined bridge" in the east-west direction and the "bridge" in the north-south direction. In order to avoid confusion with the old river name, the current river name, the old Otagawa River, will not be used, and the bridge will be referred to as the "main river".

Dual-use bridge

- Route name: Aioi Street
  - Roads: National Route 183 / National Route 261 / Hiroshima City Road Tenma-Yaga Line
  - Track: Hiroshima Electric Railway Main Line
- Bridge length: 123.35m
- Overall width: 41.00m
- Width: 40.0m (28.0m roadway, 6.0m sidewalk)
- Span length: 26.95m + 28.65m + 33.65m + 32.60m
- Bridge type: 4-span continuous steel girder bridge
- Completion: 1982 (Completed in 1983)
- Client: Ministry of Construction, Chugoku Regional Construction Bureau
- Construction: Superstructure Kawada Kogyo and Takada Kikou

Connecting Bridge

- Route name: Hiroshima City Road 2-ku 1 Line
- Bridge length: 53m
- Width: 11m - 13m
- Bridge type: Simple steel deck box girder bridge
- Completed: 1980
- Client: Hiroshima City
- Construction: Superstructure: Ishikawajima-Harima Heavy Industries
