= Kaoru Shima =

Japanese physician (1897–1977)

- 島薫
- Shima c. 1950s
- Born: 2 July 1897; Aki District, Hiroshima, Empire of Japan
- Died: 16 May 1977 (aged 79); Hiroshima, Hiroshima, Japan
- Education: Osaka Medical College
- Occupation: Physician
- Known for: Directing Shima Hospital
- Children: 1

Kaoru Shima (島薫, Shima Kaoru; 2 July 1897 – 16 May 1977) was a Japanese physician. He was the first director of the rebuilt Shima Hospital, located at the hypocenter of the atomic bombing of Hiroshima. He is known as the "father of the Hiroshima Surgical Society".

== Early life and education ==
Kaoru Shima was born in Aki District at 1897. He graduated from Hiroshima Kokutaiji High School in 1917. Other graduates in the same year included Tadanori Nagayama and Shizuo Miyama.

Shima entered Osaka Medical College in 1924. He then continued to study and train in Germany and the United States.

== Opening of Shima Hospital ==
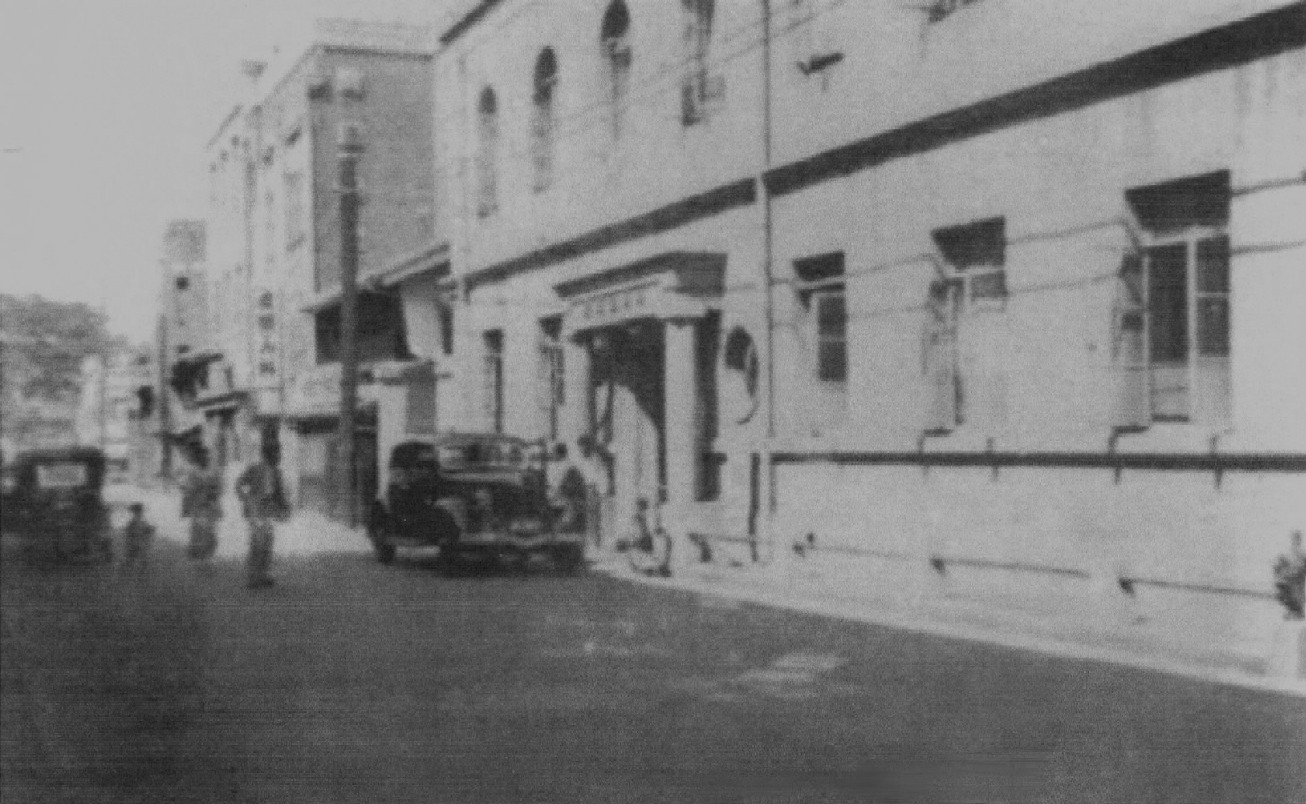
first iteration

On August 31, 1933, Kaoru Shima opened Shima Hospital. The opening letter at the time stated that the hospital "operates a surgical hospital on the east side of Hiroshima Post Office." and "provides general surgical care, especially internal surgery." When building the hospital, Shima modeled it on the management policy of Mayo Clinic, which had impressed him during his time studying in the United States, and devised a system that would allow patients to receive treatment and stay at a low cost. Shima Hospital was a large two-story hospital equipped with reinforced walls and the latest equipment for its time, and Shima's high level of technology was widely known among the city's residents. Kaoru Shima applied the rational hospital management concepts he learned in the United States, resulting in Shima Hospital's popularity as an inexpensive clinic with a high standard of treatment. Since there were few outpatient surgical clinics in the city center at the time, Shima Hospital received many patients, and the hospital rooms were always almost full. The hospital did not turn away patients who could not pay for medical care, and on one occasion they even sent vegetables as a token of appreciation. Shima Hospital, following the Mayo Clinic model, is an exception to the usual profile of hospitals found in pre-war Japan that were based on German models and medical procedures.

At that time, Shima was one of the leading figures of surgery in Hiroshima. In 1934, he founded the Hiroshima Surgical Society together with Katsuzo Kusakabe and Nobuyoshi Matsuo. He supported Toru Sakakibara and played a central role in the movement to establish the Japanese Society of Clinical Surgery.

== After the atomic bombing ==
On August 5, 1945, Shima was asked by an acquaintance to go to the nearby Kōzan Town to perform a difficult surgery with a nurse. The following day, August 6, the atomic bomb was dropped on Hiroshima City, and Shima Hospital was at the hypocenter. Shima Hospital was completely destroyed by the atomic bombing of Hiroshima; the atomic bomb detonated directly above the building and the blast was directed downwards. All the medical staff and the patients who were in Shima Hospital, about 80, died instantly. Having received news that "Hiroshima was completely destroyed," Shima returned from Kōzan that night. It was later discovered that all 80 patients and nurses had died. Thus making him and the nurse the only survivors of the atomic blast. Shima stayed in a nearby bank that had not collapsed, and worked to treat the injured at Fukuromachi Elementary School, which was being used as a temporary relief center. Shima and the nurse found a large quantity of bleached bones at the bottom of the hospital's debris, as the corpses had immediately become skeletonized by the blast. Shima also told surviving family members of the nurses and patients who came to visit him to "take home a handful of soil in place of the unknown bones." On the afternoon of August 7, Shima found an operation tool he had purchased in the U.S. at the site of the destroyed hospital, the only remaining trace of the structure.

Shima learned American medicine and practiced American medical care at his hospital. Therefore, the war with the U.S. was a considerable shock for him. Shima disagreed with the Pacific War, and subsequently risked being killed by special political police.

== Rebuilding of Shima Hospital ==
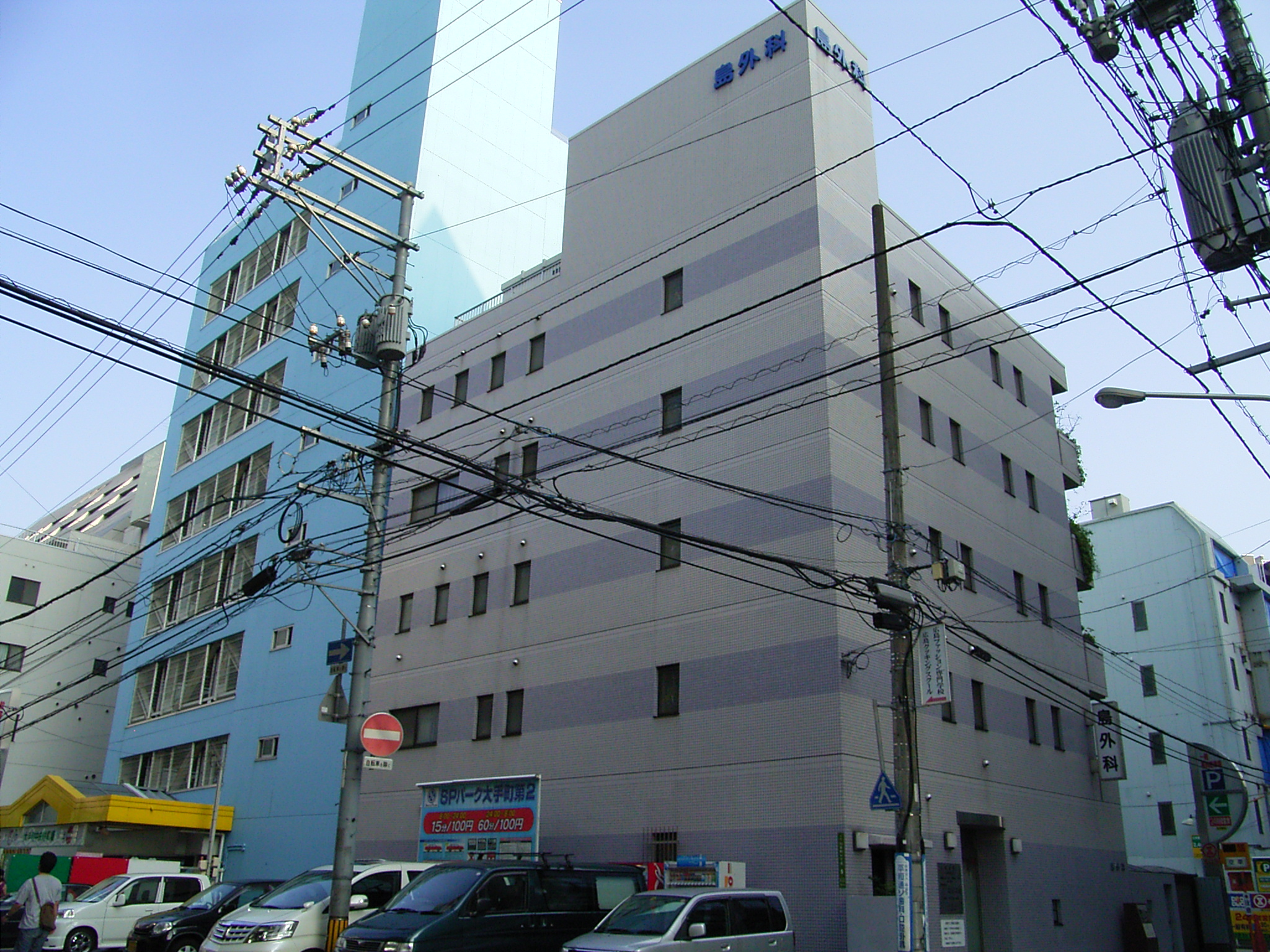
second iteration

Three years later, in 1948, Shima Hospital was rebuilt in the same place during post-war period. The new hospital opened for medical treatment in 1948. Shima was quoted as saying, "My new hospital is dedicated to peace and caring for the underprivileged and poverty stricken." The 1990s saw the hospital change into a clinic of surgery and decrease the number of beds and the name was changed to "Shima Geka." Even after the reconstruction, Shima Hospital continued to work hard to provide medical care to survivors.

In later years, he served as the second chairman of the Hiroshima Shinkin Bank (1971–1973).

== Death ==
Kaoru Shima died in 1977 at the age of 79. After his death, his son Ichisu Shima took over the hospital. His son's portrait was registered at the Hiroshima National Peace Memorial Hall for the Atomic Bomb Victims in 2016. The museum also houses a group photo of hospital staff from before the bombing, as well as a memoir written by Shima. On August 1, 2009, the clinic's name was changed to Shima Geka Naika. And Ichisu Shima retired and became honorary director. In 2017, the clinic was renamed again to Shima Naikai-in and the grandson Shuyuki Shima became the current director.
