= Kaoru Usui =

Japanese photographer

Kaoru Usui (臼井 薫, Usui Kaoru; 12 December 1916 – 1 December 2010) was a Japanese photographer known for photographing children and the life of Nagoya and environs.

Usui was born in Nagoya on 12 December 1916; the actor Shigeru Amachi (born Noboru Usui) was a younger brother. He started photography around 1933 — when he bought a Rokuoh-sha Pearlette (a besutan camera, or copy of the Vest Pocket Kodak) — and from 1934 subscribed to Photo Times, whose regular contributor Sakae Tamura inspired and influenced him.

From the 1930s to the 1950s, Usui worked to set up a series of amateur photography groups in Nagoya. One of these was Shūdan 35 (集団35), whose members in 1952 included the young Shōmei Tōmatsu.

Between 1950 and 1955 Usui won the annual award in Camera three times, his works there being highly praised by Ken Domon, whose realist approach Usui followed enthusiastically. Usui went on to win contests judged by Domon and held by Photo Art in the late 1950s.

Usui was not content to stick with realism: some of the photographs from his staged series of the 1980s Arsène Lupin appeared in Popular Photography and the self-published book of them is well regarded.

Usui won Aichi-ken Geijutsu Bunka Shōreishō (愛知県芸術文化奨励賞), a cultural award from Aichi Prefecture, in 1994. At around this time, he — like Shōji Ueda and several other photographers of his era — again came to enjoy photography with a besutan camera or lens. He died in December 2010 at the age of 93.

== Books by Usui ==
- Tobera no ki no shita (海桐花の樹の下, Under the tobira tree). Nagoya: Kaoru Usui, 1973. (in Japanese)
- Kaidō (街道). Nagoya: Kaidō Shuppan Iinkai, 1984. (in Japanese) Black and white photographs of kaidō (Japan's ancient roads).
- Arusēnu Rupan (アルーヌ・ルパン) / Arsène Lupin. Nagoya: Kaoru Usui, 1985.
- Amachi Shigeru gojūnen no kōbō (天知茂五十年の光芒). Nagoya: Usui Kaoru Shashin no Mise, 1987. (in Japanese) Photographs of Shigeru Amachi.
- Sengo o ikita kodomo-tachi (戦後を生きた子供達). Nagoya: Usui Kaoru Shashin no Mise, 1988. (in Japanese)
- Watakushi no Shōwa shashinshi: Shōwa 10-nen yori Shōwa 35-nen made (私の昭和写真史：昭和10年より昭和35年まで, My photographic history of Shōwa: From 1935 to 1970). Nagoya: Usui Kaoru Shashin no Mise, 1991. (in Japanese) Black and white photographs of this 35-year period within the Shōwa period.
- Igaguri, otenba, gaki-daishō (イガ栗、おてんば、ガキ大将). Nagoya: Kyōdo Shuppansha, 1993. ISBN 4-87670-056-7. (in Japanese) Photographs of and text about children from the late 1940s until the mid sixties; captions and texts in Japanese only.
- (Joint work.) Kita-ku, Nishi-ku-hen: Minoji, Kisoji ni sotte (北区・西区編：美濃路・木曽路に沿って). Nagoya: Kyōdo Shuppansha, 1993. ISBN 4-87670-051-6. (in Japanese)
- Shikisoku-zeku: Aichi-ken Geijutsu Bunka Senshō jushō kinen sanbusaku (色即是空：愛知県芸術文化選奨受賞記念三部作, All is vanity: Works in three parts for the Aichi Prefecture Geijutsu Bunka award). Nagoya: Kaidō Shuppan Iinkai, 1996. (in Japanese) Color photographs, including a set taken with a besutan lens.
- Ningen o ikiru (人間を生きる). Nagoya: Kyōdo Shuppansha, 1998. ISBN 4-87670-104-0. (in Japanese)
- With Toshirō Maruo (円尾敏郎). Amachi Shigeru (天知茂). Tokyo: Wides, 1999. ISBN 4-89830-012-X. (in Japanese) Photographs of Shigeru Amachi.
- Shōwa sanjū nendai no Seto: Tōjō no yama to machi to hitobito (昭和30年代の瀬戸：陶上の山と町と人々). Seto, Aichi: Seto City Art Museum, 2000. (in Japanese) Catalogue of an exhibition held at Seto City Art Museum; photographs of Seto from 1955–64, especially landscapes and children.
- Usui Kaoru ga kiroku shita sengo o ikita kodomo-tachi (臼井薫が記録した戦後を生きた子ども達). Gifu: Gifu Shinbunsha, 2002. ISBN 4-87797-043-6. (in Japanese)
