= Shima Hospital =

Shima Internist Hospital 島内科医院
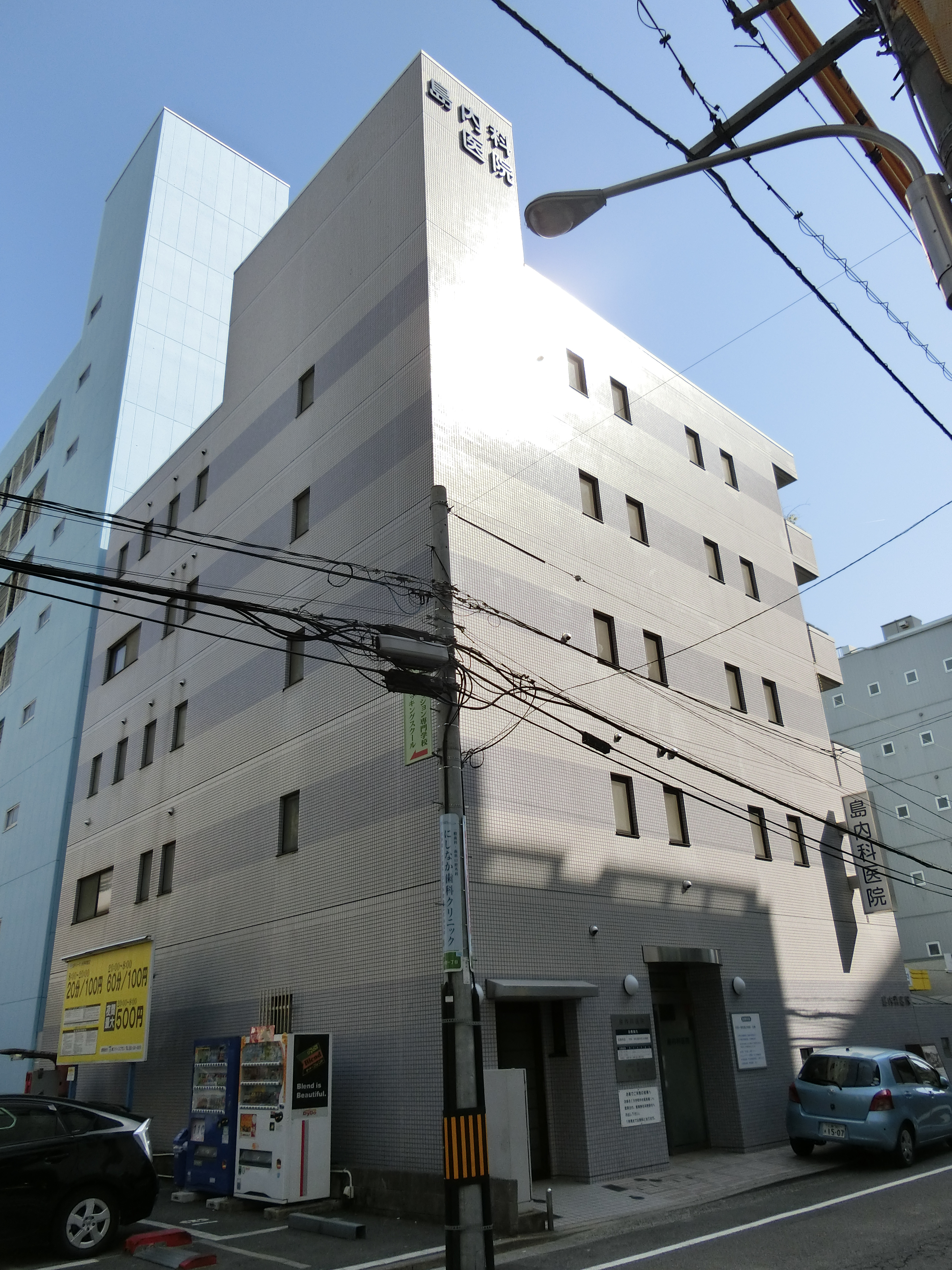
- Shima Internist Hospital building in 2018

Geography
- Location: Naka-ku, Ōtemachi 1-5-25, Hiroshima, Hiroshima, Japan
- Coordinates: 34°23′41″N 132°27′17″E

Organisation
- Type: Private

Services
- Emergency department: No

History
- Former names: Shima Hospital (島病院); Shima Geka (島外科); Shima Geka Naika (島外科内科)
- Founded: August 31, 1933; 93 years ago (original structure); 1948; 78 years ago (rebuilt facility)

Links
- Website: www.shimagekanaika.jp
- Lists: Hospitals in Japan

Shima Hospital (島病院, Shima byōin) is a hospital, now clinic, in Hiroshima, Japan. It was the exact location where the atomic bombing of Hiroshima took place on August 6, 1945. Shima Hospital is considered to be ground zero.

In 1948, the hospital was rebuilt from the ground up by Dr. Kaoru Shima. The reconstructed Shima Surgery is still in operation to the present day under the name Shima Internist Hospital (島内科医院, Shima naikai-in). Specialities of the present Shima Hospital are surgery, orthopaedics, internal medicine, and endoscopic treatment of the digestive organs. Adjacent to the Shima Hospital is a monument marking the hypocenter of the atomic blast, which is located about a five-minute walk away from the city's Atomic Bomb Dome or "A-Dome".

== Beginnings ==
Dr. Shima's family had overseen an established medicine practice in Hiroshima since the late 18th century. Proof of this can be found in a map of Nakanomura dated approximately 1780, in which the residence of the Shima family, birthplace of "Shima Hospital" founder Dr. Kaoru Shima, is noted as a clinic.

Dr. Kaoru Shima (1897–1977) graduated from the Osaka medical school, the present Osaka University medical department, which originated in the "Tekijuku" school. After graduating, he travelled throughout Europe and the United States to further his medical studies.

Following his quest to learn the latest developments in medicine and surgery and with his reputation as an excellent surgeon, he became lecturer of medicine at the Osaka Empire University (now the Osaka University), considered a high honor at the time, as the title of "honour lecturer" did not exist and Dr. Shima had a full-time occupation in Hiroshima. On August 31, 1933, Shima Hospital was founded. The Mayo Clinic served as Dr. Shima's model of choice. Shima Hospital was a two-storey building of brick construction with reinforced walls and a modern design. Kaoru Shima applied the rational hospital management concepts he learned in the United States, resulting in Shima Hospital's popularity as an inexpensive clinic with a high standard of treatment. Shima Hospital, following the Mayo Clinic model, is an exception to the usual profile of hospitals found in pre-war Japan that were based on German models and medical procedures.

== Atomic bombing ==
On August 6, 1945, Shima Hospital was completely destroyed by the atomic bombing of Hiroshima; the atomic bomb detonated directly above the building and the blast was directed downwards. Because the epicenter of the atomic bombing of Hiroshima was over the hospital, the hypocenter, or ground zero, was the hospital itself. All the medical staff and the patients who were in Shima Hospital, about 80, died instantly. At the time of the detonation, Kaoru Shima was away from Hiroshima city, as he had gone to assist a colleague with a difficult operation at a hospital in a nearby town. Thus he and his attending nurse were the only survivors of the Shima Hospital staff.

Kaoru Shima returned to Hiroshima on the night of August 6 and began treatment of the injured people. On the afternoon of August 7, Shima found an operation tool he had purchased in the U.S. at the site of the destroyed hospital, the only remaining trace of the structure. Kaoru Shima and the nurse found a large quantity of bleached bones at the bottom of the debris, as the corpses had immediately become skeletonized by the blast.

Shima learned American medical care and practised American medical care at his hospital. Therefore, the war with the U.S. was a considerable shock for him. Shima disagreed with the Pacific War, and risked being killed by special political police.

Shima's son had been evacuated to Sera and also survived. He would also become a doctor, and later became director of the hospital in its second incarnation.

In October 1945, a member of Riken who joined the academic investigation team arrived at the site and declared the Shima Hospital to be the hypocenter of the atomic bombing of Hiroshima. In 1969, the Atomic Bomb Casualty Commission published the report The Epicenters of the atomic bombs which announced the coordinates of the hypocenters after reviewing U.S. Army maps.

== Rebuilding ==
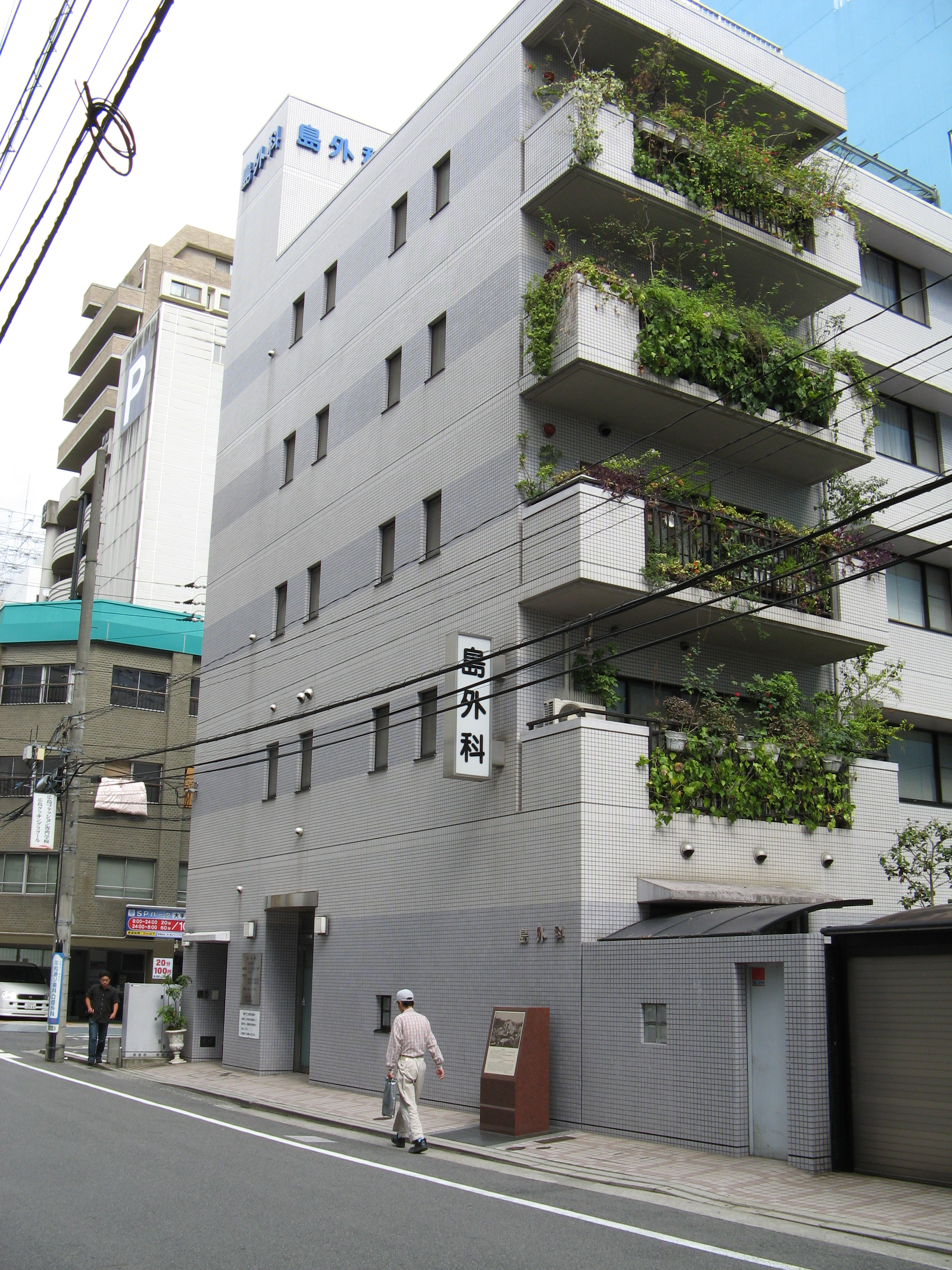
The reconstructed Shima Hospital

Shima rebuilt the hospital at the same site during the difficult post-war period. The new hospital opened for medical treatment in 1948. Shima was quoted as saying, "My new hospital is dedicated to peace and caring for the underprivileged and poverty stricken." The 1990s saw the hospital change into a clinic of surgery and decrease the number of beds. The name was changed to Shima Geka (島外科).

On August 1, 2009, the clinic's name was changed to Shima Geka Naika (島外科内科). Shima's son Ichishu Shima retired and became the honorary director. In 2017 the clinic was again renamed Shima Naikai-in. The current director Shuyuki Shima, a grandson of Kaoru Shima, is the third generation of this family to work in the hospital. The specialities of the present Shima Naikai-in are surgery, orthopaedics, internal medicine, and endoscopic treatment of the stomach and intestines. The director of today's hospital focuses on community care and thus maintains the ideals and spirit of his grandfather. The present Shima Naikai-in performs smoking cessation treatment, preventive injection, general medical examinations, cancer screening, and stress consultations. Shima Naikai-in cooperates with the Hiroshima Red Cross Hospital and Atomic Bomb Survivors Hospital.

== Gallery ==
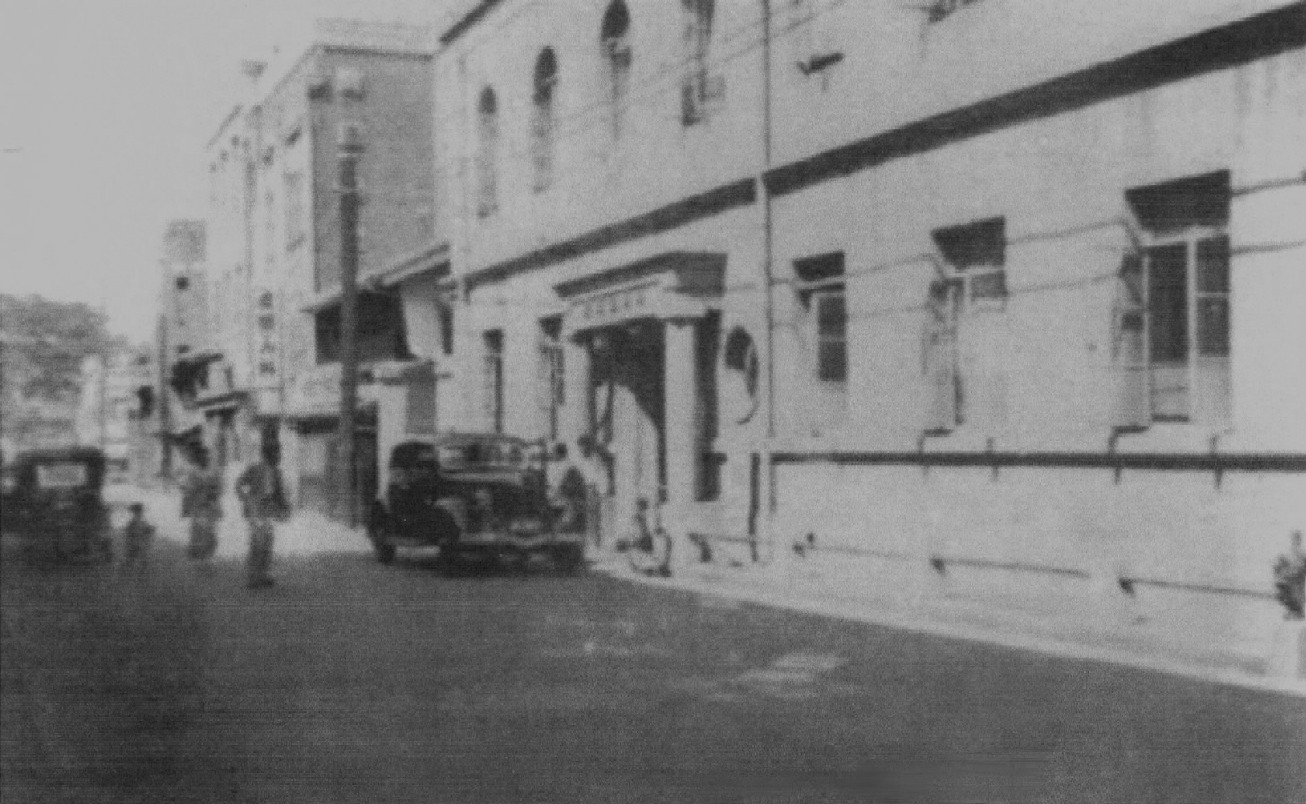
The original Shima Hospital, circa 1943

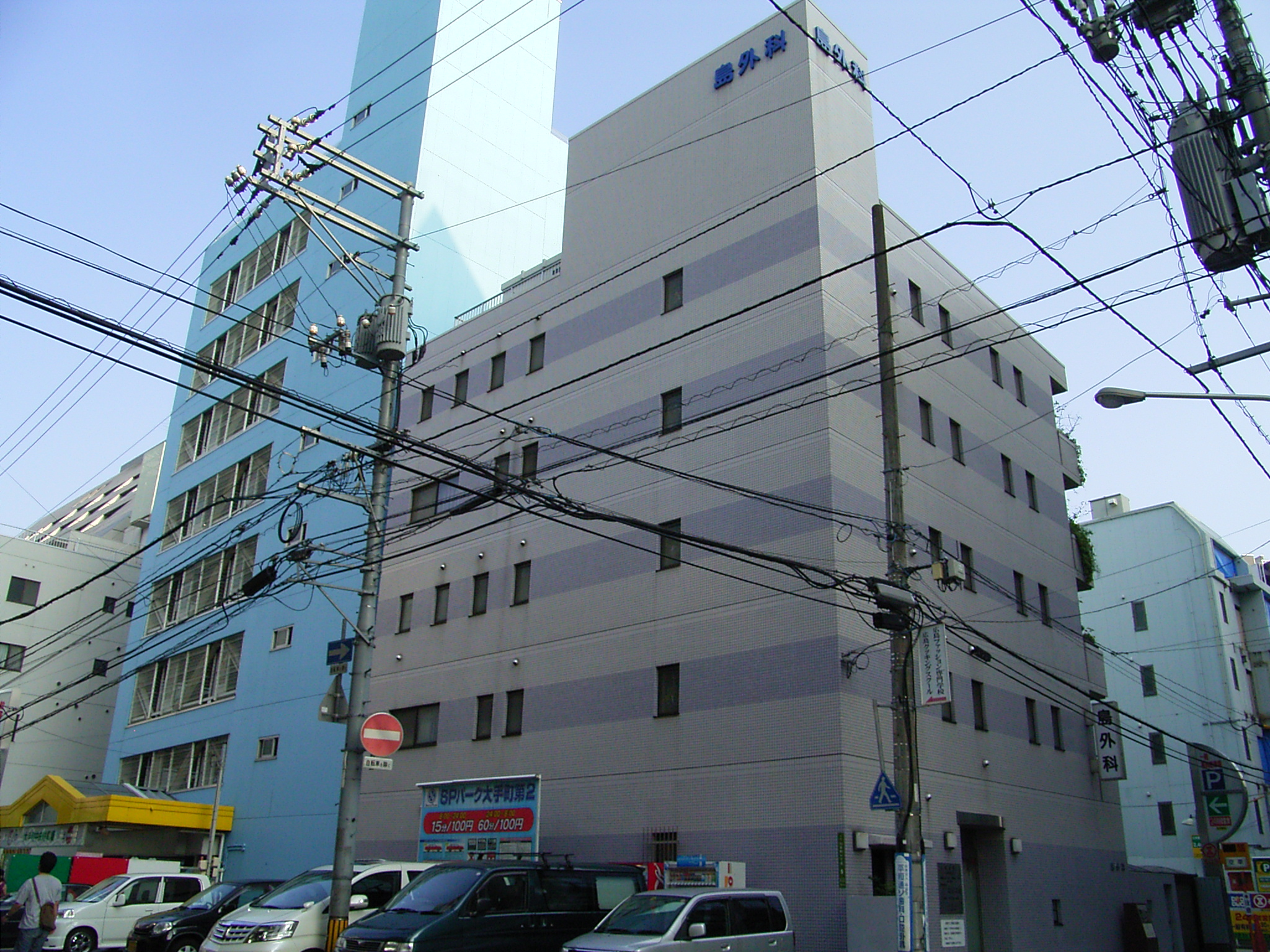
2007 (as Shima Geka)

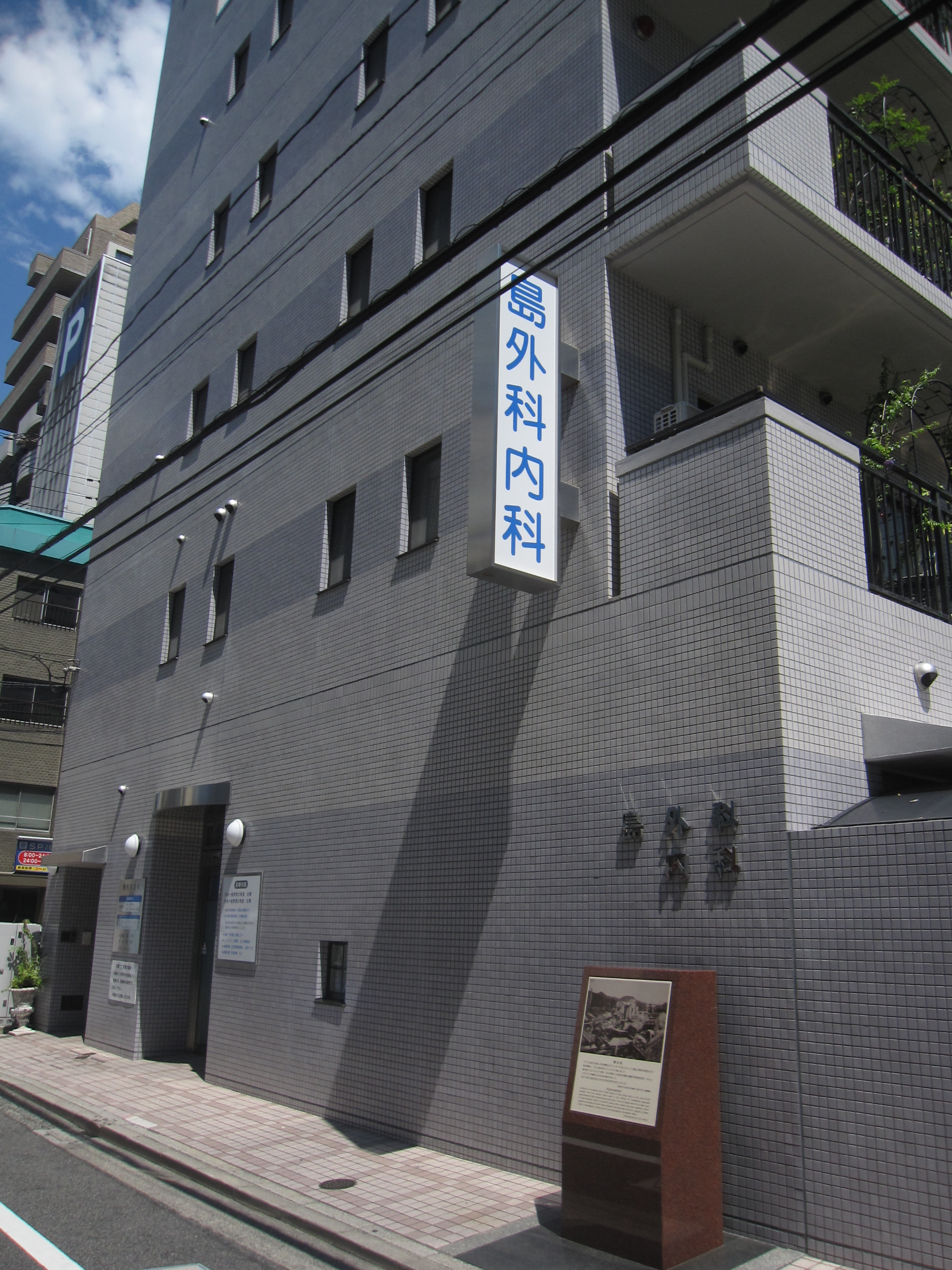
2012 (as Shima Geka Naika)

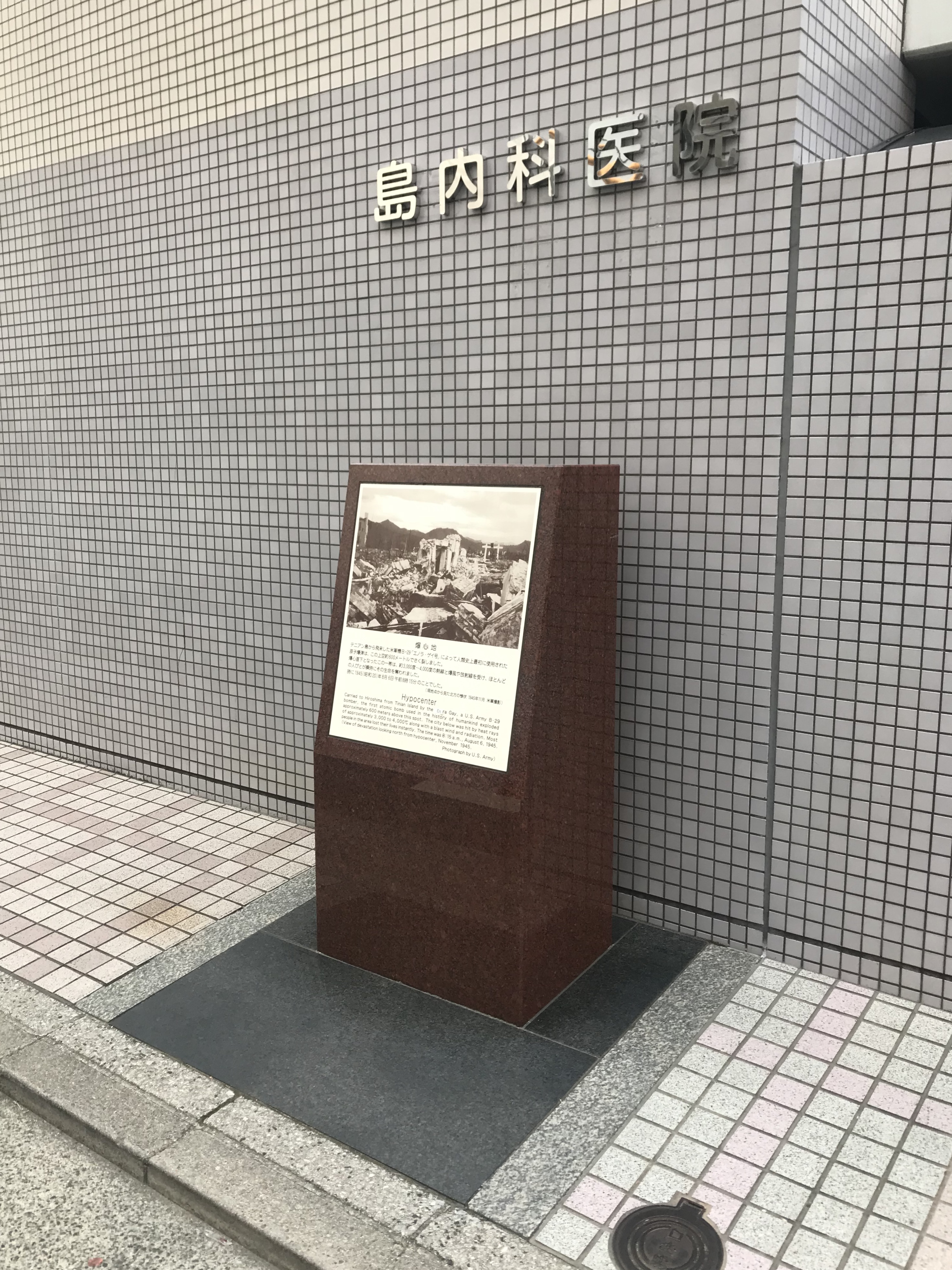
Monument to the Hypocenter of 1945 Atomic Bombing
