= Osaka Medical and Pharmaceutical University =

Coordinates: 34°51′07″N 135°37′32″E

- 大阪医科薬科大学
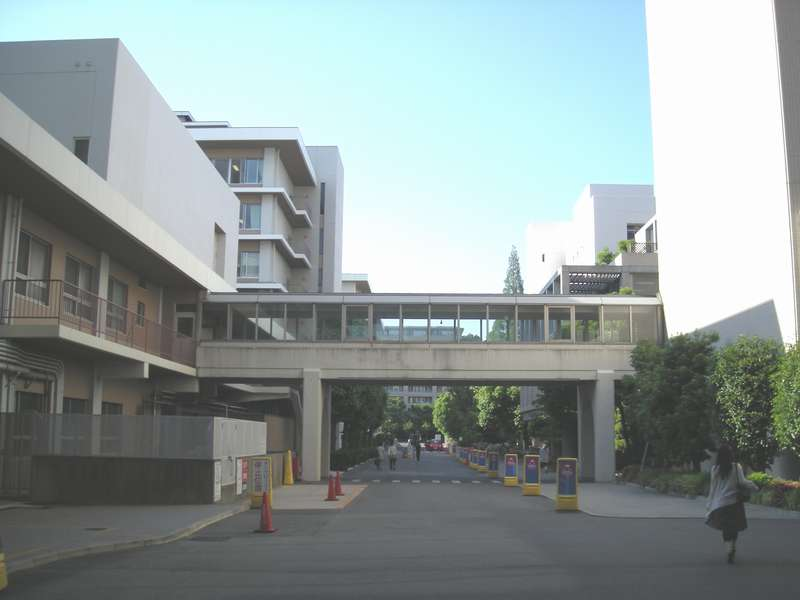
- Osaka Medical and Pharmaceutical University Main Campus
- Former names: Osaka Medical College (1946–2021)
- Type: Private
- Established: 1927
- Location: Takatsuki, Osaka, Japan
- Website: www.ompu.ac.jp

Osaka Medical College (大阪医科大学, Ōsaka ika daigaku) is a private university in Takatsuki, Osaka, Japan. The precursor of the school was founded in 1927, and it was chartered as a university in 1946. In 2021, it was renamed Osaka Medical and Pharmaceutical University (大阪医科薬科大学, Ōsaka ika yakka daigaku) due to the integration with the Osaka University of Pharmaceutical Sciences.
