= Kaoru Akimoto =

Japanese singer and lyricist

- 秋元薫
- Born: June 5, 1964 (age 62); Tokyo, Japan
- Occupation: Singer
- Years active: 1985 - present

Kaoru Akimoto (秋元薫, born June 5, 1964 in Tokyo) is a Japanese J-pop singer who performed during the 80s and 90s. She is most known for her 1986 album Cologne and the song "Dress Down", which became popular in the 2010s and 2020s due to the city pop music boom. Since its release, it has been remastered as Cologne + 1. Akimoto is also known for providing lyrics, composition and backup vocals for other singers and music groups.

== Early life ==
Akimoto was born in Tokyo, Japan on June 5, 1964, into "a very ordinary family with no connection to music". As a child, Akimoto played the piano, which started her love of music and her future career as a singer. She went to First Girls High School in Sendai, during which she played in the school band and attended several more singing auditions. She also began writing her own lyrics, something she had done since childhood. Akimoto cites her musical style as being influenced by singers such as Chaka Khan and Saki Kubota, the latter of whom she often listened to throughout high school.

== Career ==
During her college years at Aoyama Gakuin University in Tokyo, Akimoto started her singing career, providing background vocals for singer Yumi Matsutoya as well as being a chorus vocalist for her tours. In 1985, she debuted through the single "Paradox", which became the theme song for the OVA anime TV series Fire Tripper. The following year, Akimoto released her debut album Cologne featuring lyrics all self-written by Akimoto. The album initially was not a huge success, but increased in popularity decades later during the 2010s and 2020s with a resurgence of the city pop music genre amongst newer generations of music listeners. In 1989, Akimoto along with members of the jazz fusion band Casiopea joined together to form the music group Shambara, performing with the band in the 1990s. Akimoto continued to provide lyrics, compositions and vocals for other singers and musicians in the 90s. In the 2000s, Akimoto retired from the music industry, but made a comeback in 2021 with the re-issued and remastered release of the 1986 album Cologne titled Cologne + 1. She also partnered with South Korean music producer Night Tempo to create an album titled The Showa Groove, featuring a remixed version of her hit "Dress Down". In 2022, Akimoto released the single "Narcissist".

== Credits ==
- Rumic World Part 1: Flame Tripper Music Edition (るーみっくわーるど Part 1: 炎トリッパー音楽篇) (soundtrack, 1985, Victor Records)
- Paradox (1985 album) (パラドックス) (Victor Musical Industries Inc.) (from the soundtrack of the anime television series Fire Tripper)
- VIDEO ANIME vs TV ANIME Anime Song Best Collection (ビデオアニメvsテレビアニメ アニメソング ベストコレクション) (1986 vinyl LP)
- Cologne (1986 album)
- Rumic World PART 1 Fire Tripper <Drama Version> (るーみっく わーるど PART 1 炎(ファイヤー)トリッパー <ドラマ篇>) (1986 LP album)
- Shambara (1989 album)
- Slow Step (スローステップ オリジナル・サウンド・トラック) (1991 anime series soundtrack)
- Reflected in the Eyes (瞳に映して) (1991 album, Polydor Records)
- Comics Image 「Compiler」・Assembler (コミックスイメージ「コンパイラ」・アセンブラ) (1992 CD)
- Perfume (1992 album by Megumi Hayashibara)
- Tomodachi de Iikara (友達でいいから) (1994 album by Yumiko Takahashi)
- Dress Down (2017 LP vinyl)
- FINAL BOUT ~ SiIvaGunner: King for Another Day Tournament Original Soundtrack VOL. 3 (2020 CD)
- Cologne + 1 (2021 album)
- Narcissist (2022 single)
- Night Tempo Presents The Showa Groove (2022 album)
