= Kaori Hamura =

Kaori Hamura Long is a Japanese artist and illustrator. She has been credited for MTV's Beavis and Butt-head, MTV Downtown, Daria and Celebrity Deathmatch, and Spike TV and Nickelodeon's Gary the Rat. She also created MTV's Video Music Award packaging animation and MTV2 Station I.D. She has done magazine illustrations for New York Press, Time Out, Interview magazine, Mademoiselle, RayGun, COSMOgirl! and others. She has also done T-shirt designs for Anna Sui, Patricia Field, and Liquid Sky Records.

== Biography ==
Hamura was born in Fukuoka, Japan, and graduated from Parsons School of Design in 1993.

Her pilot animation, Bootie Boogie, was aired on Oxygen. Bootie Boogie has won a Silver Award for The Society of Illustrators' Annual Awards 2003 in Los Angeles.

She established a creative company, Moss Moon Studio, with Bill Long. She has written and illustrated several children's books.

She won the United Nations 75th Anniversary AR Peace Poster Competition in 2021.

== Awards ==
- Winner of United Nations 75th Anniversary AR Peace Poster Competition, Futuring Peace, 2021
- A' Design Award Winner Print and Published Media Design, 2020
- A' Design Award Winner Mobile Technologies, Applications and Software Design Category, 2020
- Competition War on Virus, Emerald Award, 2020
- Silver Awards, The Illustration West 41 Annual Awards, The Society of Illustrators of Los Angeles, 2003

== Work in films ==
Kaori Hamura at IMDb

- Captain Itch, Nickelodeon - Character Designer (2003)
- Gary the Rat, Spike TV - Character Designer (2001-2002)
- Daria, MTV Animation - Character Designer (2000-2001)
- DownTown, MTV Animation - Character designer (1999-2001)
- Bootie Boogie Oxygen Media - Creator, Animator (2000)
- Celebrity Deathmatch, MTV Animation -Character Designer and Character Modeler (1996)
- Beavis and Butt-Head Do America, MTV Animation - Senior Character Designer (1996)
- MTV Video Music Award Packaging Animation, MTV Animation - Director, Character Designer, Animator (1995)
- Beavis and Butt-Head,, MTV Animation - Character Designer (1993-1997)
