= Kaori Ishibashi =

Japanese food writer

Kaori Ishibashi 石橋かおり
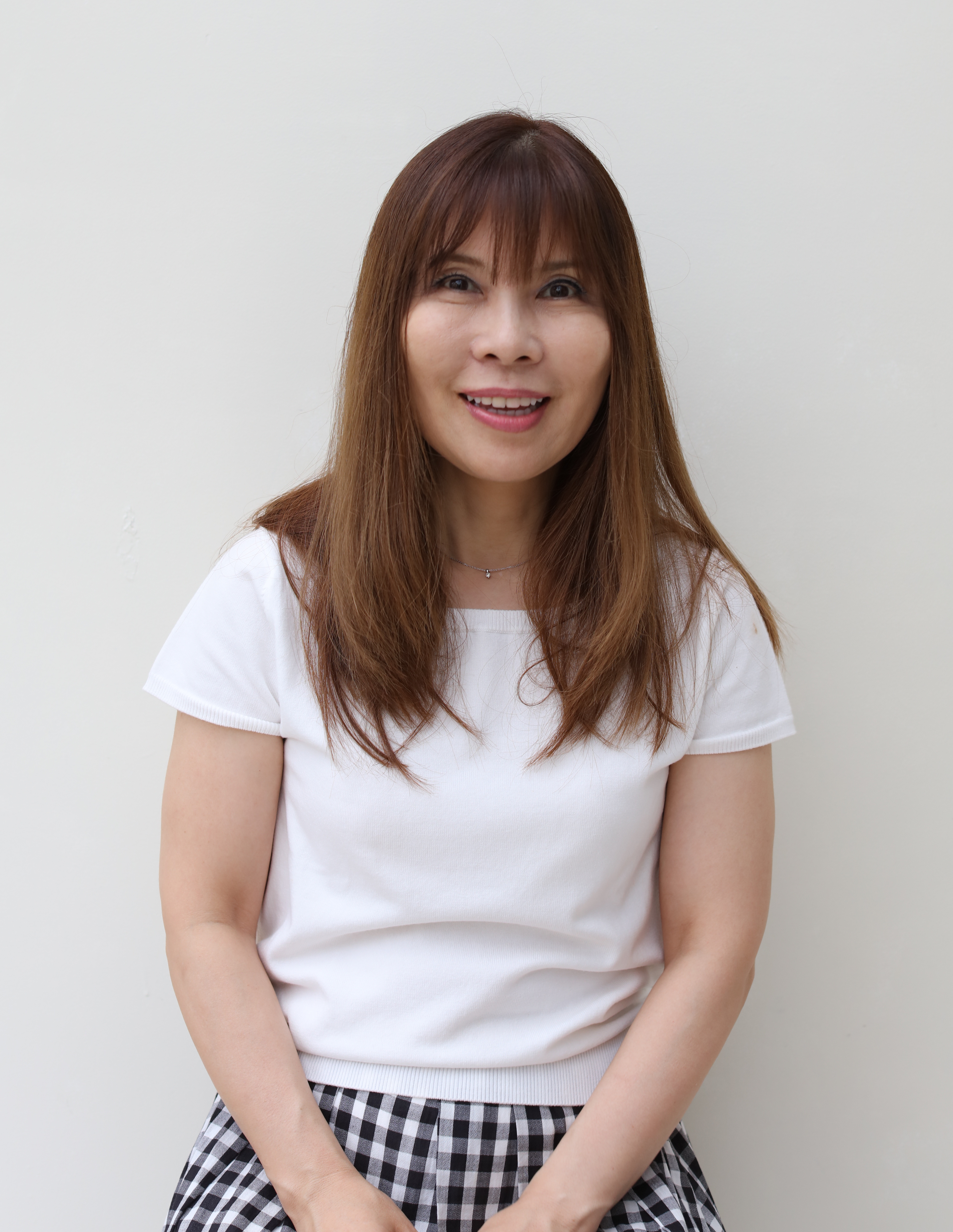
- Born: May 6, 1962 (age 64); Chiba, Japan
- Education: Meiji University of Integrative Medicine
- Occupations: Confectionery researcher, baking instructor, author
- Website: www.kaori-sweets.com

Kaori Ishibashi (石橋かおりIshibashi Kaori; born May 6, 1962) is a Japanese confectionery researcher, baking instructor, and author known for her specialty in cheesecakes. She has written 48 baking cookbooks and over 400 cheesecake recipes.

== Biography ==
Kaori Ishibashi was born in Chiba, Japan and raised in Nagano where she graduated from Suwafutaba High School. She went on to attend Meiji University of Integrative Medicine and graduated as a practitioner in acupuncture and moxibustion. After graduating, she worked at Tokyo Jiyugaoka Hospital as a chiropractor and practitioner of moxibustion.

== Career ==
Ishibashi began her confectionery career as a self-taught baker starting off with wholesale business to local restaurants and taking request orders for wedding cakes while working as an acupuncturist in 1992. Fascinated by the art of baking, she began reading cookbook after cookbook wondering why her finished product never turned out as expected. Unsatisfied with the conventional methods found in the cookbooks she read she decided to learn under confectioner and former house of representatives member Makiko Fujino. After 3 years under the training of Fujino, she received a diploma from Makiko Foods Studio. Thereafter she attended various culinary schools around the world such as Bellouet Conseil in France, The Culinary Institute of America, Valrhona Chocolate School in France, and received training under various French chefs visiting Japan. In 1996 through collection of data from hundreds of baking experiments she was able to compile them into her first published book "絶対失敗しないシッフォンケーキ" (zettai shippai shinai shifon kēki; "Chiffon cake never fails"). She also runs her own baking studio "Cake" (ケイク） in her newly renovated house in Nagano where she offers a year long class on the fundamentals of baking.

== Current projects ==
Ishibashi is currently living and working in Nagano, Japan as a confectionery researcher and author. She regularly publishes recipes in various magazines such as "レタスクラブ (retasukurabu), "Saita", "おはよう奥さん" (ohayō okusan), "天然生活" (tennen seikatsu). She is also president of Cake Freak Inc. Ishibashi is currently focusing her efforts on opening her own cheesecake shop in New York City.

== Bibliography ==
Cookbooks
Title	Year	Publisher
絶対失敗しないシフォンケーキ zettai shippai shinai shifon kēki	1996	雄鶏社
絶対失敗しないスポンジケーキ zettai shippai shinai suponji kēki	1996	雄鶏社
ja|型とサイズで選ぶお菓子}< kata to saizu de erabu okashi	1997	雄鶏社
スイートハートケーキ suītohāto kēki	1998	主婦と生活社
絶対失敗しないパイとタルト zettai shippai shinai pai to taruto	1998	雄鶏社
シンプルスタイルのチーズケーキ shinpuru sutairu no chīzu kēki	1988	雄鶏社
チョコレートの小さなお菓子 chokorēto no chīsana okashi	1998	主婦と生活社
絶対失敗しないシフォンケーキII zettai shippai shinai shifon kēki II	1999	雄鶏社
ワンボウルでできるお菓子 wan bōru de dekiru okashi	2000	雄鶏社
ニューヨークスタイルのお菓子 nyūyōku sutairu no chīzu kēki	2000	雄鶏社
石橋かおりのひんやりデザート ishibashi kaori no hinyari dezāto	2001	雄鶏社
シンプルチョコ shinpuru choko	2002	雄鶏社
プレゼントしたい！チョコのお菓子 puresento shitai! choko no okashi	2003	大泉書店
石橋かおりのお菓子レッスン焼き菓子 ishibashi kaori no okashi ressun yaki kashi	2003	雄鶏社
石橋かおりのお菓子レッスン焼き菓子 ishibashi kaori no okashi ressun dezāto	2004	雄鶏社
石橋かおりのお菓子レッスンデザート ishibashi kaori no okashi ressun yaki kashi	2004	雄鶏社
食感が決め手！チーズケーキ shokukan ga kimete! chīzu kēki	2004	サンリオ
4つの季節のシンプルチーズケーキ yottsu no kisetsu no shinpuru chīzu kēki	2004	主婦と生活社
石橋かおりのお菓子レッスンチョコレート ishibashi kaori no okashi ressun chokorēto	2004	雄鶏社
くだもののお菓子 kudamono no okashi	2005	雄鶏社
たまごのお菓子 tamago no okashi	2005	雄鶏社
くるくるチョコと水玉ショコラ kurukuru choko to mizutama shokora	2006	主婦と生活社
チーズのケーキchīzu no kēki	2006	MCプレス
ホットケーキミックスで基本のお菓子 hottokēkimikkusu de kihon no okashi	2007	レタスクラブ
デイリーマフォン&おめかしカップケーキ deirīmafon & omekashi kappu kēki	2007	MCプレス
おいしいチーズケーキの作り方 oishi chīzu kēki no tsukurikata	2007	雄鶏社
食感が決め手！焼き菓子 shokukan ga kimete! yaki okashi	2008	サンリオ
パイとタルト pai to taruto	2008	MCプレス
Pink！	2009	アスペクト
べイクドチーズケーキ&レアチーズケーキ beikudo chīzu kēki & rea chīzu kēki	2010	主婦の友社
男子スイーツレシピ danshi suītsu reshipi	2010	主婦の友社
米粉の焼き菓子 komeko no yaki kashi	2010	主婦の友社
シフォンケーキとシフォンロール shifon kēki to shifon rōru	2010	主婦の友社
ハッピーチーズケーキレシピ happī chīzu kēki reshipi	2011	主婦と生活社
ハッピーチーズデザートレシピ happī chīzu dezāto reshipi	2011	主婦と生活社
ハッピーチーズケーキシーズンレシピ春夏編 happī chīzu kēki shīzun reshipi harunatsu hen	2012	主婦と生活社
ハッピーチーズケーキレシピ秋冬編 happī chīzu kēki reshipi akifuyu hen	2012	主婦と生活社
ハッピーチーズケーキハートフルレシピ happī chīzu kēki hātofuru reshipi	2013	主婦と生活社
はじめてのナチュラルスイーツ hajimete no nachuraru suītsu	2013	講談社
ハッピーチーズケーキギフトレシピ happī chīzu kēki gifuto reshipi	2014	主婦と生活社
卵黄・卵白使い切る！シフォンケーキシフォンロール+10レシピ 改訂版 ranō ranpaku tsukaikiru! Shifon kēki shifon rōru + 10 reshipi kaiteiban	2014	主婦の友社
ベストオブチーズケーキ besutōbu chīzu kēki	2015	講談社
ブラウニーとガトーショコラ buraunī to gatōshokora	2015	文化出版局
アイス1年中 天然生活ムック aisu ichi nen chū tennen seikatsu mukku	2016	地球丸
チーズのケーキ 改訂版 chīzu no kēki kaiteiban	2016	マイナビ出版
チーズケーキとチョコレートケーキ chīzu kēki to chokorēto kēki	2016	地球丸
米粉のお菓子 komeko no okashi	2017	主婦の友社

Radio Appearances
Channel
ラジオ東京FM

FM Tokyo radio

FM長野

FM Nagano

SBCラジオ

SBC radio

TV appearances
Program
はなまるマーケット

hanamaru māketto

さんま大先生

sanma daisensei

イマジカTV

Imajica TV

料理コーナーを担当

lead on ryōri kōnā

Magazine
Name
MOM vol.109 5/1/2014
プラス1リビング NO.21

"Plus 1 living"
