= 509th Operations Group =

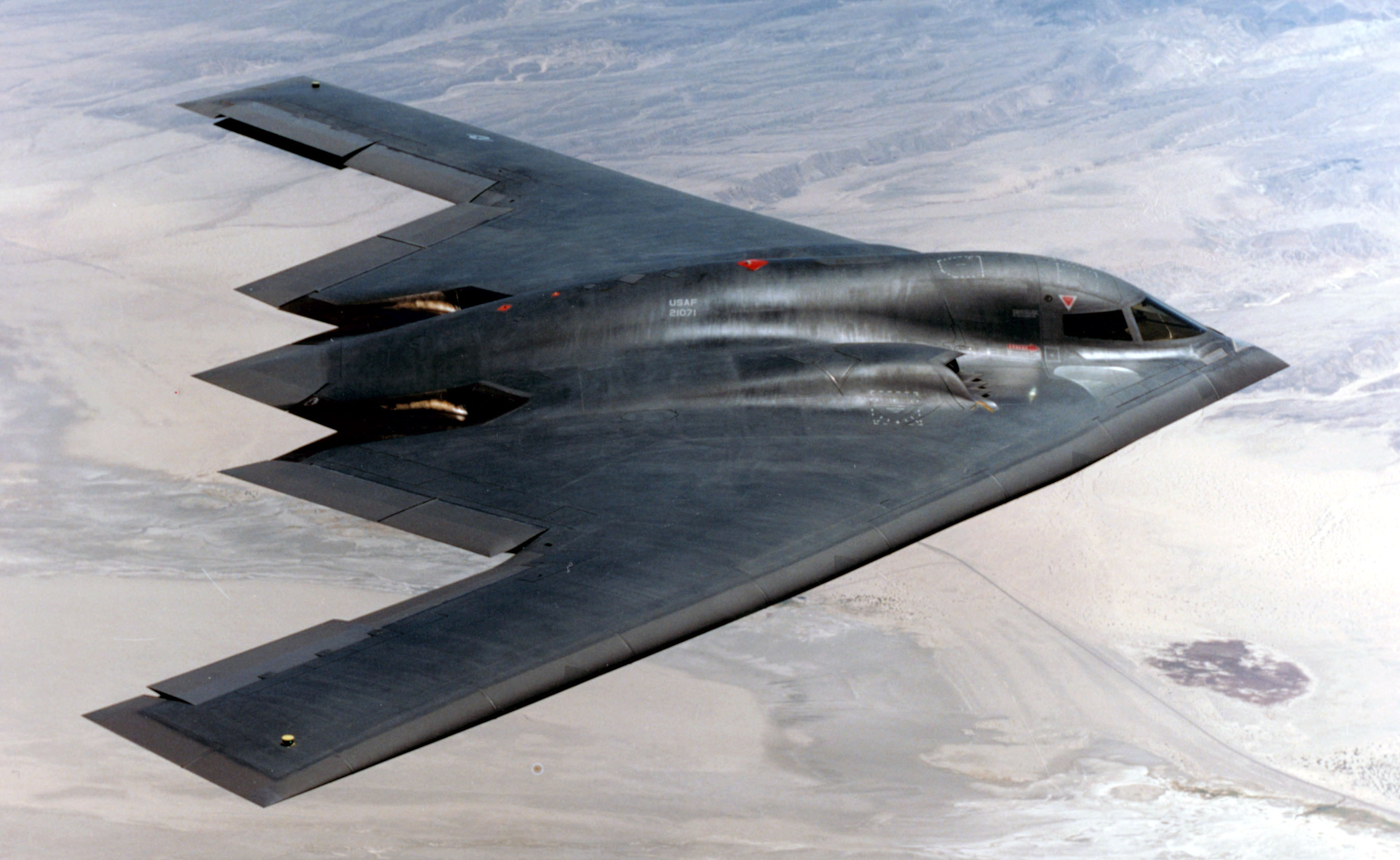
- Group B-2A Spirit
- Active: 9 December 1944 – 16 June 1952; 15 July 1993 – present
- Country: United States
- Branch: United States Air Force
- Type: Operations Group
- Role: B-2 Combat and Training Operations
- Size: 3 squadrons
- Part of: Air Force Global Strike Command
- Garrison/HQ: Whiteman Air Force Base, Missouri
- Engagements: World War II – Asiatic-Pacific Theater: Air Offensive, Japan; Eastern Mandates; Western Pacific

- Decorations: Air Force Outstanding Unit Award

Insignia
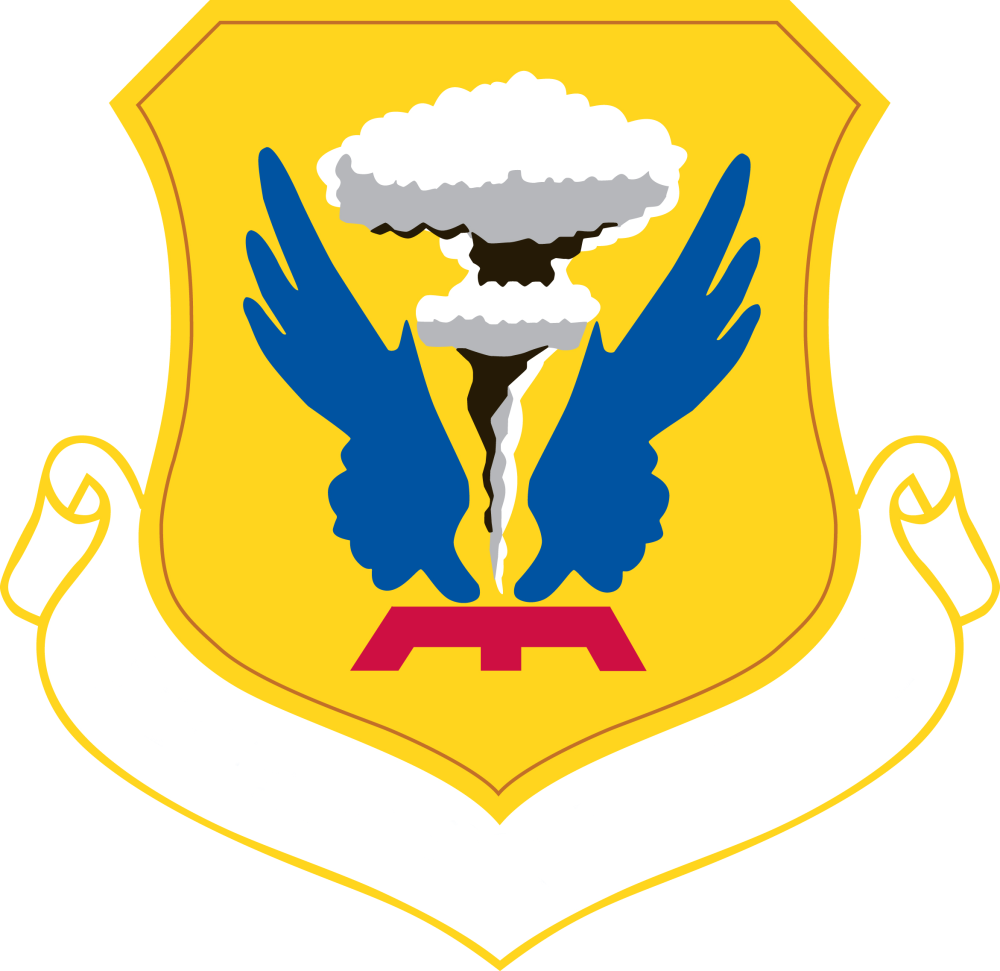
- 509th Operations Group emblem (Note: While assigned to the 509th Wing, the group uses the wing emblem with the group designation on the scroll. AF Instruction 84-105, Organizational Lineage, Honors and History, 27 April 2017, paragraph 3.3.3.)
- Tail code: WM

Aircraft flown
- Bomber: B-2 Spirit

The 509th Operations Group is the flying component of the United States Air Force 509th Bomb Wing, stationed at Whiteman Air Force Base, Missouri. It is equipped with all 20 of the USAF's B-2 Spirit stealth bombers, flown by its 393rd Bomb Squadron. Its 13th Bomb Squadron, the training unit for the 509th, provides training in Northrop T-38 Talon trainers as well as in the 393rd's B-2 Spirits.

The 509 OG traces its history to the World War II 509th Composite Group, which conducted the atomic bombings of Hiroshima and Nagasaki, Japan, in August 1945.

Redesignated the 509th Bombardment Group, Very Heavy in 1946, the group was one of the original ten bombardment groups of Strategic Air Command. The unit was also the host organization at Roswell Army Airfield, New Mexico in July 1947 during the alleged Roswell incident.

The 509th Bombardment Group was inactivated in 1952. In 1993, the unit was reactivated as the 509 OG, as part of the Objective Wing organization implementation of the 509th Bomb Wing.

== Units ==
The 509th OG consists of three component squadrons:

- 13th Bomb Squadron

Originally activated as the 325th Bomb Squadron on 6 January 1998. Re-designated the 13th BS ("Grim Reapers") on 23 September 2005, when that unit, flying B-1 Lancers as part of the 7th Operations Group, was inactivated. As the Formal Training Unit, the 13th BS provides Initial Qualification, Requalification, and Flight Instructor Candidate B-2 Training. Additionally, it manages the T-38 Companion Trainer Program and three Weapons Systems Trainers (flight simulators).

- 393rd Bomb Squadron

The 393rd BS ("Tigers"), a traditional squadron of the 509th, was activated as a B-2 squadron on 27 August 1993. It is the USAF's only operational bomb squadron.

- 509th Operations Support Squadron

A non-flying squadron, the 509th OSS ("Hawks") controls all airfield activities at Whiteman.

== Unofficial insignia ==
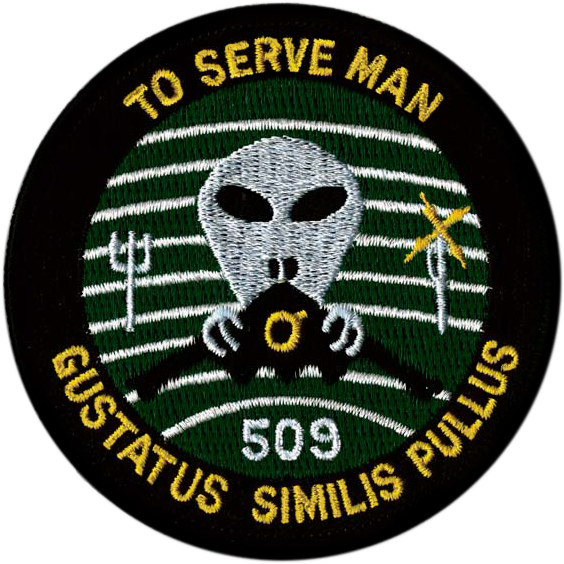

In addition to its official insignia, during B-2 stealth bomber test flights, some members of the 509th Bomb Wing procured an unofficial insignia involving an alien, the legend To Serve Man (referring to a famous Twilight Zone episode), and the inscription Gustatus Similis Pullus (Dog Latin for "Tastes like chicken").

A second variation carried the term "Classified Test Flight" instead of the Twilight Zone reference, and both harkened to the 509th's connection to the "Roswell incident".

== History ==
The historical roots of the 509th OG begin on 17 December 1944 when the 509th Composite Group was formed at Wendover Field, Utah under Second Air Force. The 509th was formed with one mission in mind: to drop the Atomic Bomb.

The group deployed to the Western Pacific in May 1945 and was assigned to the Twentieth Air Force 313th Bombardment Wing, stationed at North Field, Tinian, in the Mariana Islands. Operations of the group, however, were controlled by Headquarters, USAAF with the 313th Bomb Wing providing logistical support.

The 509th CG made history on 6 August 1945, when the Boeing B-29 Superfortress "Enola Gay," piloted by Colonel Paul W. Tibbets, Jr., dropped the first atomic bomb on Hiroshima, Japan. The B-29 "Bockscar," piloted by Major Charles Sweeney flew over the Japanese mainland on 9 August 1945 and dropped the second atomic bomb on Nagasaki.

=== Cold War ===
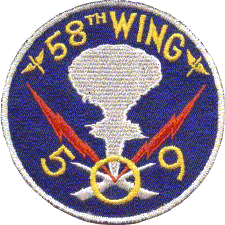
Early 1946 509th Composite Group B-29 Era patch when unit was assigned to the 58th Bombardment Wing.

In November 1945, the group returned to the United States and was assigned to Roswell Army Air Base, New Mexico. For a brief period of time from January to March 1946 the 509th was assigned to the 58th Bombardment Wing at Fort Worth AAF, Texas, before returning to Roswell. The Group was assigned to Strategic Air Command on 21 March 1946, being one of the first eleven organizations assigned to SAC. At the time SAC was formed, the 509th Composite Group was the only unit to have experience with nuclear weapons and thus is regarded by many historians as the foundation on which SAC was built. In April 1946 many of the group's aircraft deployed to Kwajalein as part of Operation Crossroads, a series of atomic bomb tests. The remainder became the core of two new squadrons activated as part of the group, the 715th Bomb Squadron and the 830th Bomb Squadron.

On 10 July 1946, the group was renamed the 509th Bombardment Group, Very Heavy and the 320th Troop Carrier Squadron was disbanded. With the creation of the United States Air Force as a separate service, the group became the combat component of the 509th Bomb Wing on 17 November 1947, although it was not operational until 14 September 1948, when Col. John D. Ryan was named commander. As a result of postwar reductions only the 509th was equipped for the delivery of atomic bombs.

The group was redesignated as a medium bomb group in 1948 as part of the Strategic Air Command, and acquired an aerial refueling mission with the assignment of Boeing KB-29s. Its 27 operational Silverplate B-29s (the 309th had ultimately received 53 of the 65 produced) were transferred in 1949 to the 97th Bomb Wing at Biggs Air Force Base, El Paso, Texas, when the group converted to Boeing B-50D Superfortresses. The B-50D was the last derivative of the B-29 family and designed specifically for the atomic bombing mission. It was one of the last piston-engined bombers built, having a top speed just short of 400 mph (644 km/h), faster than many World War II-era piston-engined fighters still in service at the time.

During the Korean War, the 509th remained in the United States as President Harry S. Truman wasn't willing to risk extensive use of the USAF strategic bomber force, which was being used as a deterrent for possible Soviet aggression in Europe.

Its squadrons were removed on 1 February 1951, and assigned directly to the wing, effectively ending its operations. The 509th was inactivated on 16 June 1952 as part of a SAC (and later Air Force-wide) phase-out of groups with the adoption of the Tri-Deputate organization.

=== Modern era ===
The 509th Bomb Group was redesignated as the 509th Operations Group and activated on 12 March 1993 as part of the 509th Bomb Wing's reorganization under the USAF Objective Wing plan. All flying squadrons, as well as an Operational Support Squadron (OSS) were assigned to the 509th OG. The first B-2 Spirit stealth bomber arrived and was assigned to the 509th on 17 December 1993 (the date was the 49th anniversary of the activation of the 509th Composite Group and the 90th of the Wright brothers' flight).

On 17 September 1996, three 509th B-2s dropped three inert GBU-36 weapons, the highly accurate Global Positioning System-Aided Munitions (GAM) which used the GPS-Aided Targeting System (GATS). The B-2s made the drops at the Nellis AFB, Nevada, bombing range. Range officials, inspecting the area after the releases, were astonished to find that the GBU-36s had fallen seven, four, and four feet, respectively, from the target. A month later, the 509th repeated this impressive feat—only this time, they used live weapons. On 8 October 1996, three B-2s revisited the Nellis range and released 16 2,000 lb. class GBU-36 bombs from an altitude of 40,000 feet. Again, amazed range personnel discovered all sixteen projectiles hit close enough to their targets to be confirmed as 16 kills. The results so impressed USAF Chief of Staff General Ronald Fogleman that he announced at a mid-December press conference the 509th and the B-2 would reach limited (conventional) operational capability on 1 January 1997.

==== Operation Allied Force ====
The B-2 first saw combat 23 March 1999, during NATO operations in Serbia and Kosovo, the first sustained offensive combat air offensive conducted solely from U.S. soil. Over a period of two months, the 509th generated 49 B-2 sorties flown roundtrip from Missouri to targets in Southeastern Europe.

Although the B-2s accounted for only 1 percent of all NATO sorties, the aircraft's all-weather, precision capability allowed it to deliver 11 percent of the munitions used in the air campaign. The missions lasted an average of 29 hours, demonstrating the global reach of the B-2.

On the night of 7–8 May 1999, during the Kosovo War B-2s flying out of Whiteman attacked the Belgrade embassy of the People's Republic of China, killing three and causing heavy damage. Although a strike was authorized against a target called 'Belgrade Warehouse 1', the CIA-provided coordinates pinpointed the embassy's location. Neither the aircrew nor the US Air Force were found to have any responsibility for the affair.

==== Operation Enduring Freedom ====
Following the terrorist attacks on New York City and Washington, D.C., on 11 September 2001, the 509th quickly transitioned to a wartime mode by joining forces with the 314th Airlift Wing, Little Rock Air Force Base, Arkansas, and the Missouri Air National Guard's 139th Airlift Wing, St. Joseph, Missouri, to send Missouri Task Force-1 to assist rescue efforts at the World Trade Center.

In October 2001, the B-2 led America's strike force in Afghanistan, hitting the first targets in the country to "kick down the door" for the air campaign which followed. The bombers again flew from Missouri to their targets before landing at Diego Garcia in the Indian Ocean to exchange crews while the engines continued to run. The combat missions lasted more than 40 hours, with the aircraft operating continuously for more than 70 hours without incident before returning to Whiteman.

After twice proving its ability to fly combat missions from Missouri, the wing stepped up efforts to deploy the B-2 from forward locations. By late 2002, the Air Force had completed special shelters for the aircraft at Diego Garcia. The shelters provided a controlled climate similar to the facilities at Whiteman for specialized work on the aircraft skin in order to maintain its stealth characteristics. This ability to sustain operations from a forward location added a new dimension of flexibility to potential air campaigns.

==== Operation Iraqi Freedom ====
The new shelters were put to use when the B-2 bombers again led a coalition air strike against the Iraqi regime of Saddam Hussein, on 21 March 2003. The famous "shock and awe" campaign saw unprecedented use of precision-guided munitions by the B-2 in an effort to minimize collateral damage and destroy key targets. The campaign also marked another milestone for the 509th, as B-2s flew combat missions from both Whiteman and a forward deployed location simultaneously.

Only a decade after delivery, the B-2 was now a proven weapons system, a veteran of three campaigns and first-ever forward deployment. In recognition of the maturity of the system and the unit, the Air Force declared the B-2 fully operational capable.

Since 2003, the B-2's forward presence has become a reality and proved the aircraft can deliver combat airpower, any time and any place. The deployment to Guam, which began in February 2005, provided a continuous bomber presence in the Asia Pacific region and augmented Pacific Command's establishment of a deterrent force. The 80-day tour, the longest in the bomber's 13-year history, also marked the first B-2 deployment since the aircraft was declared fully operational.

=== Lineage ===
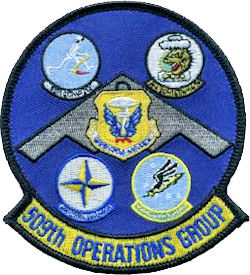
Gaggle patch of 509 OG squadrons. Consists of (clockwise from top left): 13th Bomb Squadron, 393rd Bomb Squadron, 509th Operations Support Squadron, 394th Combat Training Squadron and 509th Bomb Wing (center).

- Established as 509 Composite Group on 9 December 1944

Activated on 17 December 1944
Redesignated: 509 Bombardment Group, Very Heavy, on 10 July 1946
Redesignated: 509 Bombardment Group, Medium, on 2 July 1948
Inactivated on 16 June 1952

- Redesignated 509 Operations Group on 12 March 1993

Activated on 15 July 1993

=== Assignments ===
- Second Air Force, 17 December 1944
- 315th Bombardment Wing, 18 December 1944
- 313th Bombardment Wing, c. June 1945
- Second Air Force, 10 October 1945
- 58th Bombardment Wing, 17 January 1946
- Fifteenth Air Force, 31 March 1946
- Eighth Air Force, 1 November 1946
- 509th Bombardment Wing, 17 November 1947 – 16 June 1952
- 509th Bomb Wing, 15 July 1993 – present

=== Components ===
- 13th Bomb Squadron: since 9 September 2005
- 320th Troop Carrier Squadron: 17 December 1944 – 19 August 1946
- 325th Bomb (later, 325th Weapons) Squadron: 6 January 1998 – 9 September 2005
- 393d Bombardment (later 393d Bomb) Squadron: 17 December 1944 – 16 June 1952 (detached 17 November 1947 – 14 September 1948 and 1 February 1951 – 16 June 1952); since 27 August 1993
- 394th Bombardment (later, 394th Combat Training) Squadron: 6 November 1996 – c. 13 April 2018
- 509th Air Refueling Squadron: 19 July 1948 – 16 June 1952 (detached 19 July – 14 September 1948 and 1 February 1951 – 16 June 1952)
- 715th Bombardment Squadron: 6 May 1946 – 16 June 1952 (detached 17 November 1947 – 14 September 1948 and 1 February 1951 – 16 June 1952)
- 830th Bombardment Squadron: 6 May 1946 – 16 June 1952 (detached 17 November 1947 – 14 September 1948 and 1 February 1951 – 16 June 1952)

=== Stations ===
- Wendover Field, Utah, 17 December 1944 – 26 April 1945
- North Field, Tinian, Mariana Islands, 29 May – 17 October 1945
- Roswell Army Air Field (later Walker Air Force Base), New Mexico, 6 November 1945 – 16 June 1952
- Whiteman Air Force Base, Missouri, since 15 July 1993

=== Aircraft ===
- Boeing B-29 Superfortress, 1944–1950
- Douglas C-47 Skytrain, 1944–1945
- Douglas C-54 Skymaster, 1945–1946
- Boeing KB-29 Superfortress, 1948–1952
- Boeing B-50 Superfortress, 1949–1952
- B-2 Spirit, 1993–present
- Northrop T-38 Talon, 1993–present

== Bibliography ==
- Bock, Frederick (ed). 509th Composite Group: 50th Anniversary Reunion, Albuquerque NM, 5 August to 10. 1995 (Revised and Corrected Edition 1997).
- Bowers, Peter M. Boeing B-29 Superfortress. Stillwater, Minnesota: Voyageur Press, 1999. ISBN 0-933424-79-5.
- Campbell, Richard H. The Silverplate Bombers: A History and Registry of the Enola Gay and Other B-29s Configured to Carry Atomic Bombs. Jefferson, North Carolina: McFarland & Company, Inc., 2005. ISBN 0-7864-2139-8.
- Hess, William N. Great American Bombers of WW II. St. Paul, Minnesota: Motorbooks International, 1999. ISBN 0-7603-0650-8.
- Krauss, Robert and Amelia Krauss. The 509th Remembered: A History of the 509th Composite Group as Told by the Veterans Themselves, 509th Anniversary Reunion, Wichita, Kansas 7–10 October 2004. 509th Press., 2005. ISBN 0-923568-66-2.
- LeMay Curtis and Bill Yenne. Super Fortress. London: Berkley Books, 1988. ISBN 0-425-11880-0.
- Mann, Robert A. The B-29 Superfortress: A Comprehensive Registry of the Planes and Their Missions. Jefferson, North Carolina: McFarland & Company, 2004. ISBN 0-7864-1787-0.
- Marx, Joseph L. Seven Hours to Zero. New York: G.P. Putnam Son's, 1967.
- Ossip, Jerome J. (ed). 509th Composite Group History – 509th Pictorial Album. Chicago, Illinois: Rogers Printing Company, 1946.
- Pace, Steve. Boeing B-29 Superfortress. Ramsbury, Marlborough, Wiltshire, United Kingdom: Crowood Press, 2003. ISBN 1-86126-581-6.
- Rhodes, Richard. The Making of the Atomic Bomb. Simon & Schuster, 1986. ISBN 0-684-81378-5.
- Thomas, Gordon and Max Morgan Witts. Enola Gay. New York: Stein & Day Publishing, 1977. ISBN 0-8128-2150-5.
- Thomas, Gordon and Max Morgan Witts. Ruin from the Air: The Enola Gay's Atomic Mission to Hiroshima. London: Hamilton, 1977. (republished in 1990 by Scarborough House)
- Tibbets, Paul W. Flight of the Enola Gay. Reynoldsburg, Ohio: Buckeye Aviation Book Company, 1989. ISBN 0-942397-11-8.
- Wheeler, Keith. Bombers over Japan. Virginia Beach, Virginia: Time-Life Books, 1982. ISBN 0-8094-3429-6.
