= John J. Nichols =

U.S. Air Force general

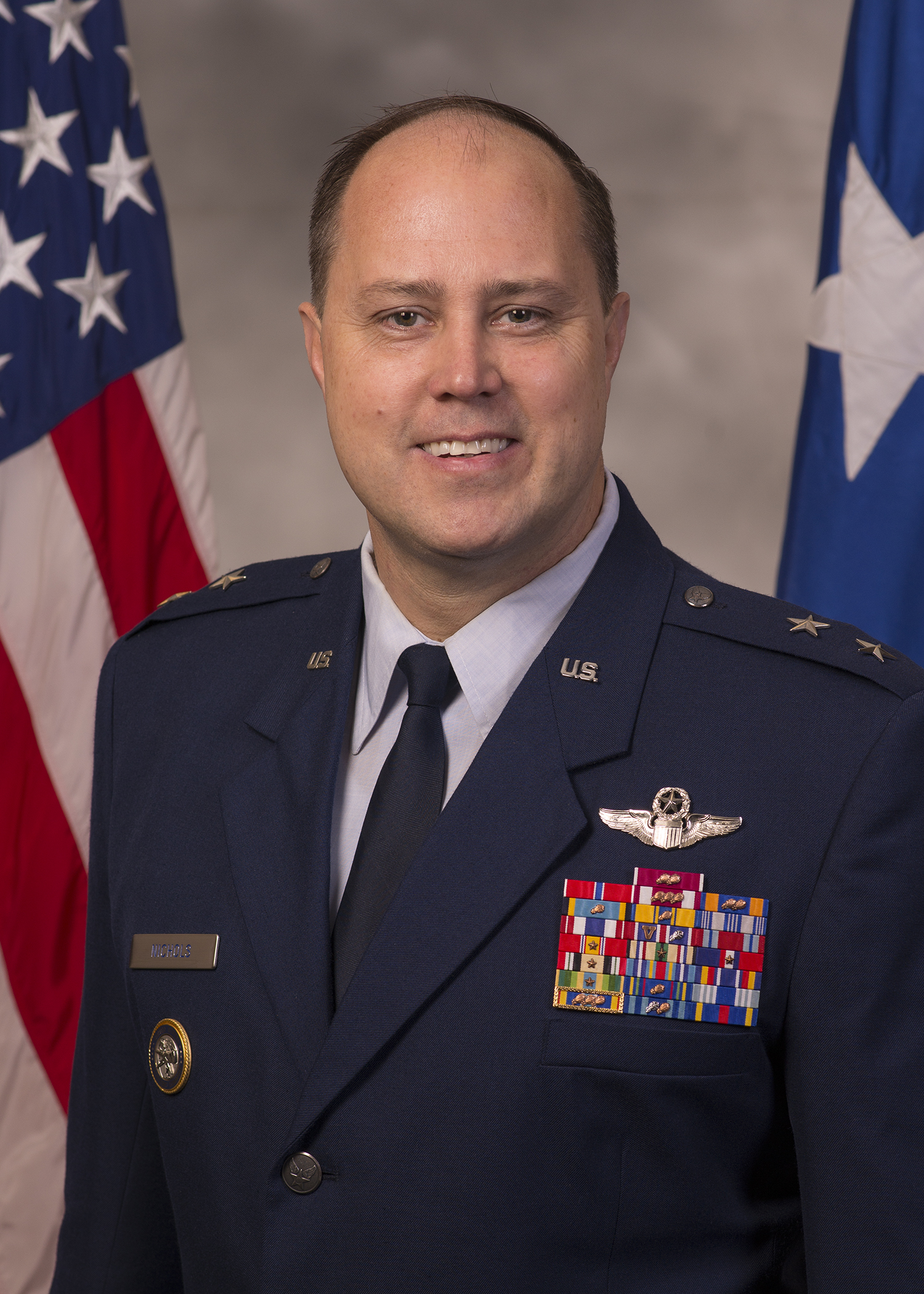
- Born: Huron, Ohio, U.S.
- Military career
- Allegiance: United States
- Branch: United States Air Force
- Service years: 1992–2024
- Rank: Major General
- Commands: 509th Bomb Wing; 14th Flying Training Wing; 28th Operations Group; 28th Bomb Squadron
- Conflicts: Iraq War
- Awards: Legion of Merit (3); Bronze Star Medal

John Joseph Nichols is a retired United States Air Force major general who served as the director of operations of the United States Strategic Command. He previously served as director of global power programs at the Office of the Assistant Secretary for Acquisition, Technology, and Logistics. He also commanded the 509th Bomb Wing.

== Military career ==
In July 2022, Nichols was reassigned as director of operations of the United States Strategic Command.

Military offices
Preceded by Paul W. Tibbets IV	Commander of the 509th Bomb Wing; 2017–2019	Succeeded by Jeffrey T. Schreiner
Preceded by Gregory S. Bowen	Deputy Director of Global Operations of the United States Strategic Command; 2019–2021	Succeeded by Glenn T. Harris
Preceded by Stephen L. Davis	Director of Global Power Programs at the Office of the Assistant Secretary for Acquisition, Technology, and Logistics; 2021–2022	Succeeded by Mark B. Pye
Preceded by Thomas Ishee	Director of Global Operations at the United States Strategic Command; 2022–2024	Succeeded by Brandon D. Parker
