= Michael E. Fortney =

United States Air Force general

- Military career
- Allegiance: United States
- Branch: United States Air Force
- Service years: 1978–2017
- Rank: Major General
- Commands: 341st Missile Wing; 90th Operations Group; 576th Intercontinental Ballistic Missile Flight Test Squadron
- Awards: Defense Superior Service Medal (2); Legion of Merit (2)

Michael E. Fortney is a retired major general in the United States Air Force. He was Vice Commander of the Air Force Global Strike Command from 2015 until his retirement in 2017.

== Military career ==
Fortney originally enlisted in the United States Air Force in 1978. He was commissioned an officer in 1986 and was stationed at Minot Air Force Base. In 1990, Fortney became Executive Officer of the 57th Air Division at Minot.

In 1992, Fortney was stationed at Francis E. Warren Air Force Base. He was then assigned to Vandenberg Air Force Base. After serving at United States Strategic Command from 1999 to 2001, he returned to Vandenberg Air Force Base.

From 2004 to 2005, Fortney was stationed at Tinker Air Force Base. In 2005, he returned to Francis E. Warren Air Force Base and assumed command of the 90th Operations Group. Fortney then returned to Vandenberg again and became Vice Commander of the 30th Space Wing in 2007. The following year, he assumed command of the 341st Missile Wing at Malmstrom Air Force Base. After serving again for a time at United States Strategic Command, he assumed his current position in 2011.

Awards Fortney has received include the Defense Superior Service Medal with oak leaf cluster, Legion of Merit with oak leaf cluster, the Defense Meritorious Service Medal, the Meritorious Service Medal with two oak leaf clusters, the Air Force Commendation Medal with two oak leaf clusters, the Air Force Achievement Medal with two oak leaf clusters, the Combat Readiness Medal and the National Defense Service Medal with service star.

== Education ==
- Wayland Baptist University
- University of Virginia Darden School of Business
- John F. Kennedy School of Government – Harvard University
- Squadron Officer School
- Air Command and Staff College
- Joint Forces Staff College
- Naval War College

Military offices
Preceded by ???	Director of Operations of the Air Force Global Strike Command; 2013–2015	Succeeded by Glen D. VanHerck
Preceded by Richard M. Clark	Vice Commander of the Air Force Global Strike Command; 2015–2017	Succeeded by Paul W. Tibbets IV
