= Glen VanHerck =

United States Air Force general

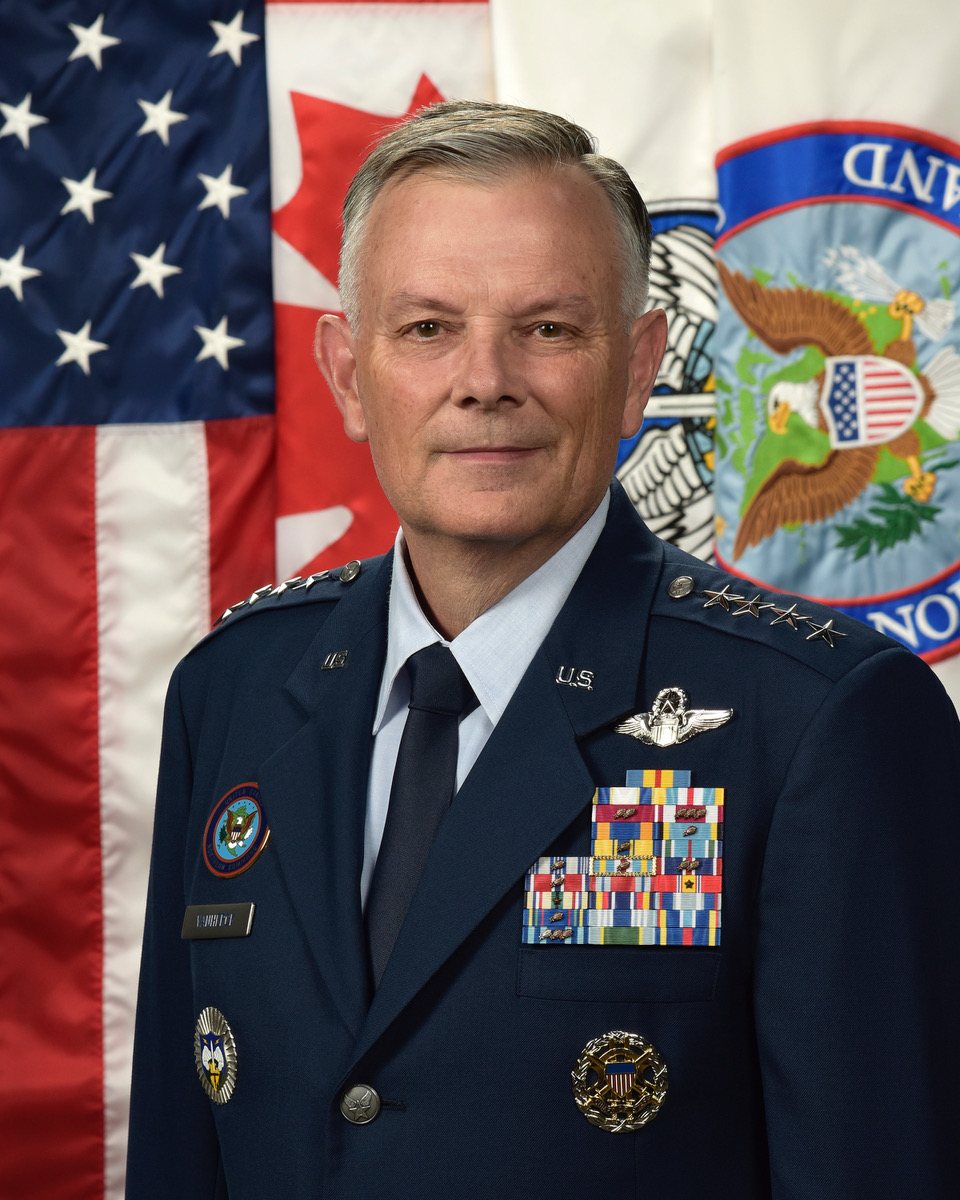
- Born: Glen David VanHerck; October 20, 1962 (age 63); Murray, Kentucky, U.S.
- Education: University of Missouri (BA); United States Naval War College (MA)
- Military career
- Allegiance: United States
- Branch: United States Air Force
- Service years: 1987–2024
- Rank: General
- Commands: United States Northern Command; North American Aerospace Defense Command; United States Air Force Warfare Center; 509th Bomb Wing; 7th Bomb Wing; 325th Weapons Squadron
- Awards: Defense Distinguished Service Medal; Air Force Distinguished Service Medal; Defense Superior Service Medal; Legion of Merit (3)
- Glen D. VanHerck's voice VanHerck's opening statement at a Senate Armed Services Committee hearing on the 2022 USNORTHCOM posture Recorded March 24, 2022

Glen David VanHerck (born October 20, 1962) is a retired United States Air Force general who last served as the commander of United States Northern Command and North American Aerospace Defense Command from 2020 to 2024. He previously served as Director of the Joint Staff from 2019 to 2020.

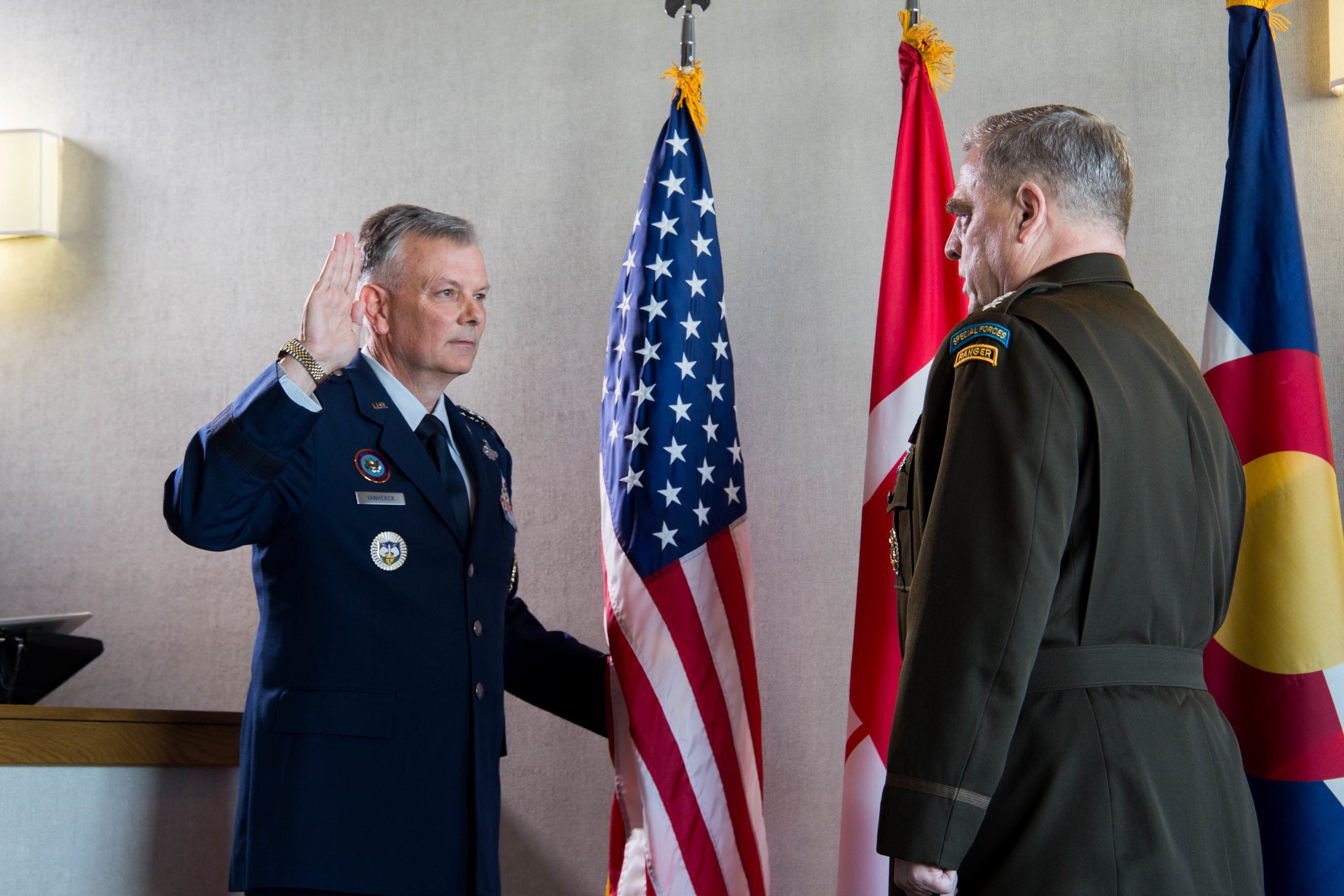
VanHerck is sworn in by chairman of the Joint Chiefs of Staff, General Mark A. Milley, as commander of NORAD and USNORTHCOM in a change of command ceremony on August 20, 2020.

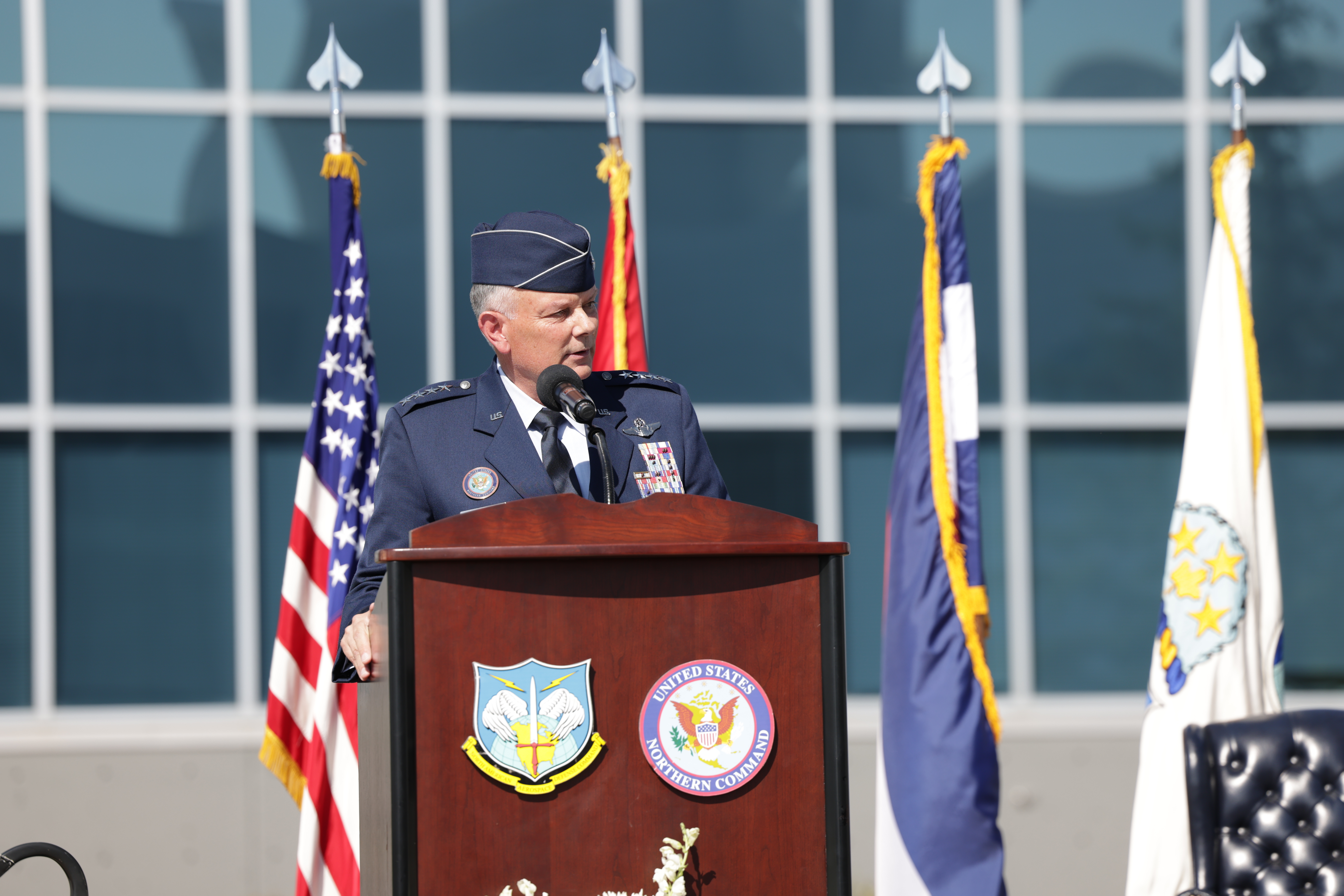
VanHerck provides remarks at the 9/11 20th anniversary commemoration ceremony at Peterson Space Force Base on September 11, 2021.

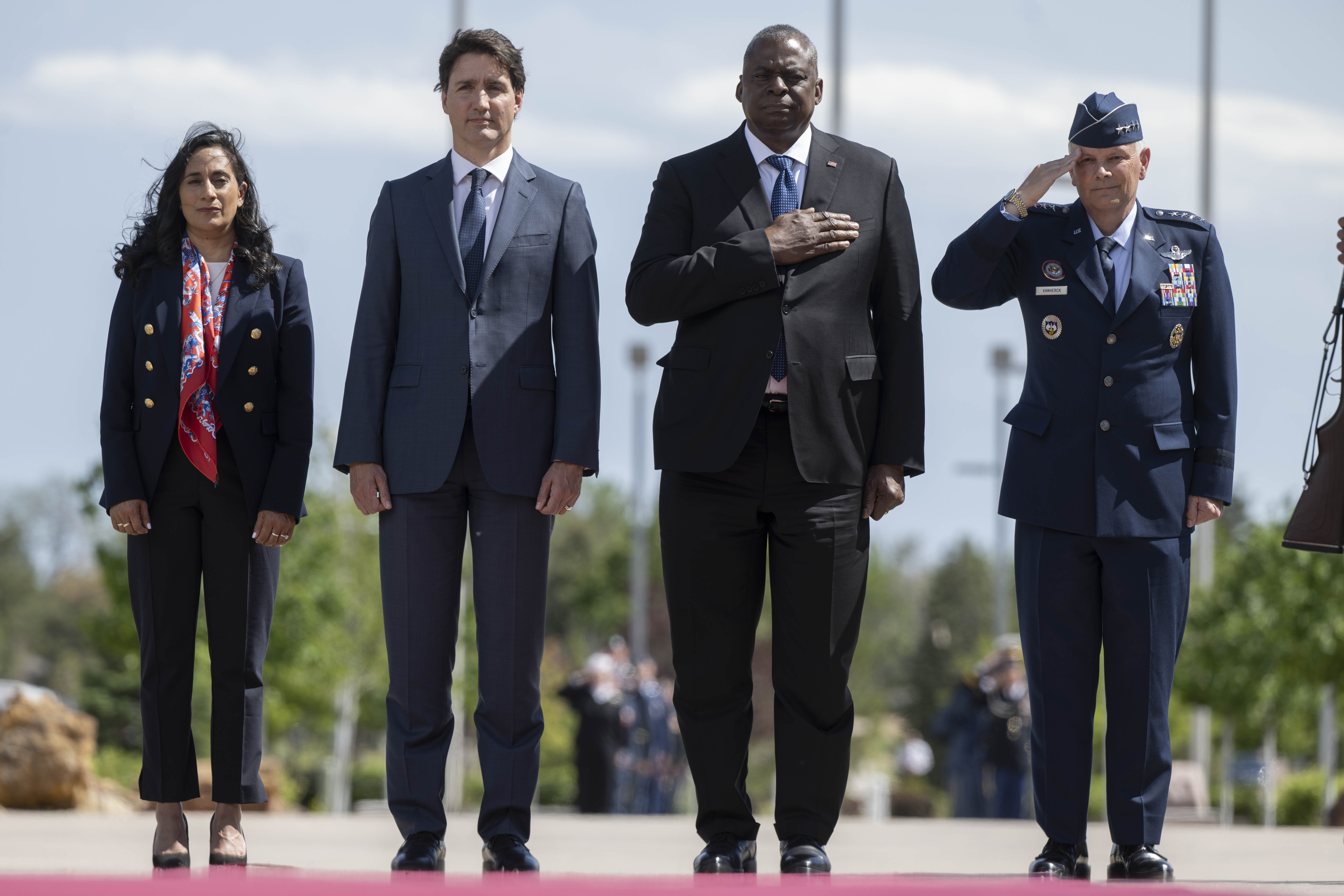
VanHerck with Canadian Defense Minister Anita Anand, Canadian Prime Minister Justin Trudeau, Secretary of Defense Lloyd Austin at U.S. Northern Command headquarters on June 7, 2022

VanHerck was born in Murray, Kentucky, and raised in Bismarck, Missouri. He graduated from the University of Missouri, where he was commissioned through the Air Force Reserve Officer Training Corps in 1987. He is currently a Senior Fellow at the Johns Hopkins Applied Physics Laboratory.

== Awards and decorations ==
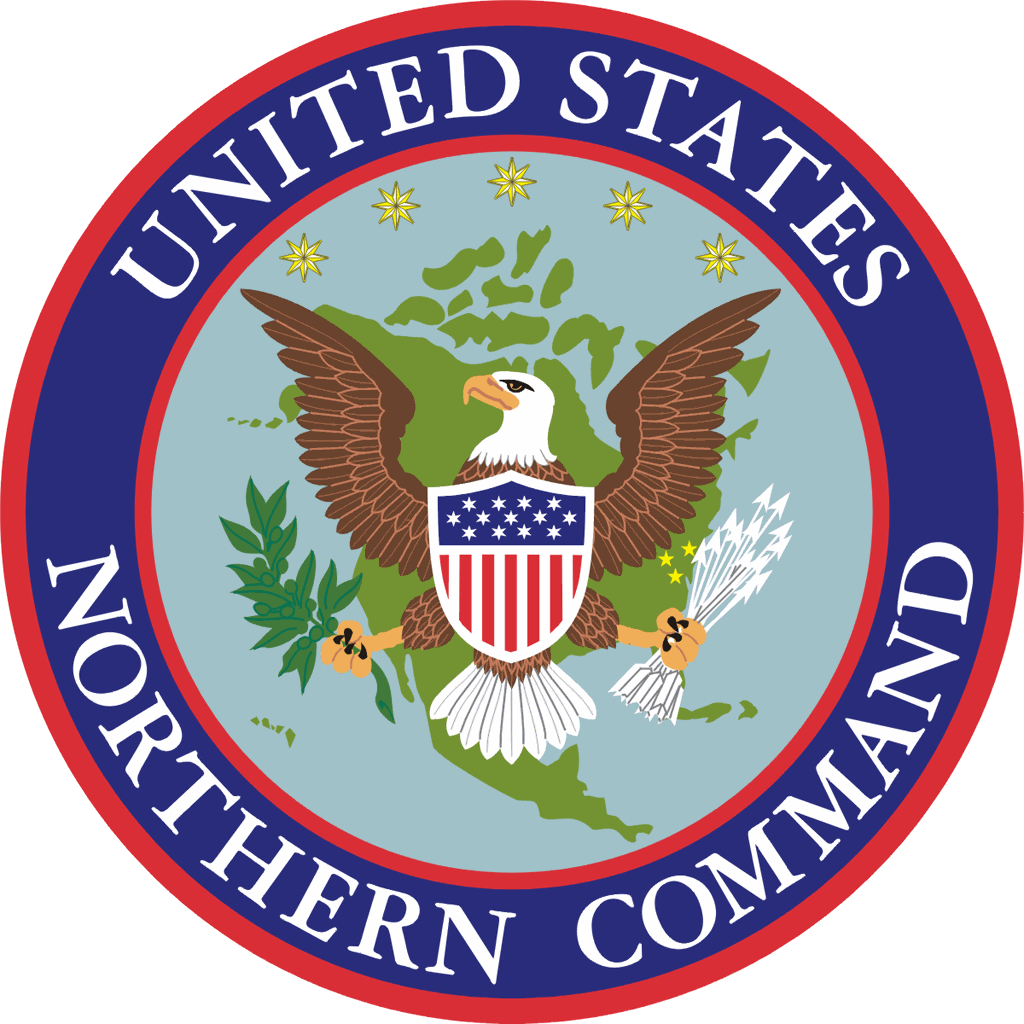
US Air Force Command Pilot Badge
Office of the Joint Chiefs of Staff Identification Badge
North American Aerospace Defense Command Badge
United States Northern Command Badge

Defense Distinguished Service Medal
Air Force Distinguished Service Medal
Defense Superior Service Medal
Legion of Merit with two bronze oak leaf clusters
Meritorious Service Medal with three oak leaf clusters
Air Medal
Aerial Achievement Medal with oak leaf cluster
Air Force Commendation Medal with oak leaf cluster
Joint Service Achievement Medal
Air Force Achievement Medal with oak leaf cluster
Joint Meritorious Unit Award with oak leaf cluster
Air Force Outstanding Unit Award with two oak leaf clusters
Air Force Organizational Excellence Award with oak leaf cluster
Combat Readiness Medal
National Defense Service Medal with one bronze service star
Southwest Asia Service Medal with service star
Global War on Terrorism Service Medal
Armed Forces Service Medal
Air and Space Campaign Medal
Nuclear Deterrence Operations Service Medal with oak leaf cluster
Air Force Overseas Long Tour Service Ribbon
Air Force Expeditionary Service Ribbon
Air Force Longevity Service Award with one silver and two bronze oak leaf clusters
Small Arms Expert Marksmanship Ribbon
Air Force Training Ribbon

== Effective dates of promotion ==
Insignia	Rank	Date
	General	August 20, 2020
	Lieutenant General	September 27, 2019
	Major General	May 13, 2016
	Brigadier General	September 2, 2013
	Colonel	September 1, 2007
	Lieutenant Colonel	February 1, 2003
	Major	August 1, 1998
	Captain	September 16, 1991
	First Lieutenant	September 16, 1989
	Second Lieutenant	September 16, 1987

Military offices
Preceded by David Béen	Commander of the 7th Bomb Wing; 2012–2014	Succeeded by Michael Starr
Preceded by Thomas A. Bussiere	Commander of the 509th Bomb Wing; 2014–2015	Succeeded by Paul W. Tibbets IV
Preceded by Jay B. Silveria	Commander of the United States Air Force Warfare Center; 2016–2017	Succeeded by Peter Gersten
Preceded by Michael M. Gilday	Director of the Joint Staff; 2019–2020	Succeeded by William D. Byrne Jr. Acting
Preceded by Terrence J. O'Shaughnessy	Commander of the United States Northern Command and the North American Aerospace Defense Command; 2020–2024	Succeeded by Gregory M. Guillot
