= Paul W. Tibbets IV =

US Air Force general (born 1966)

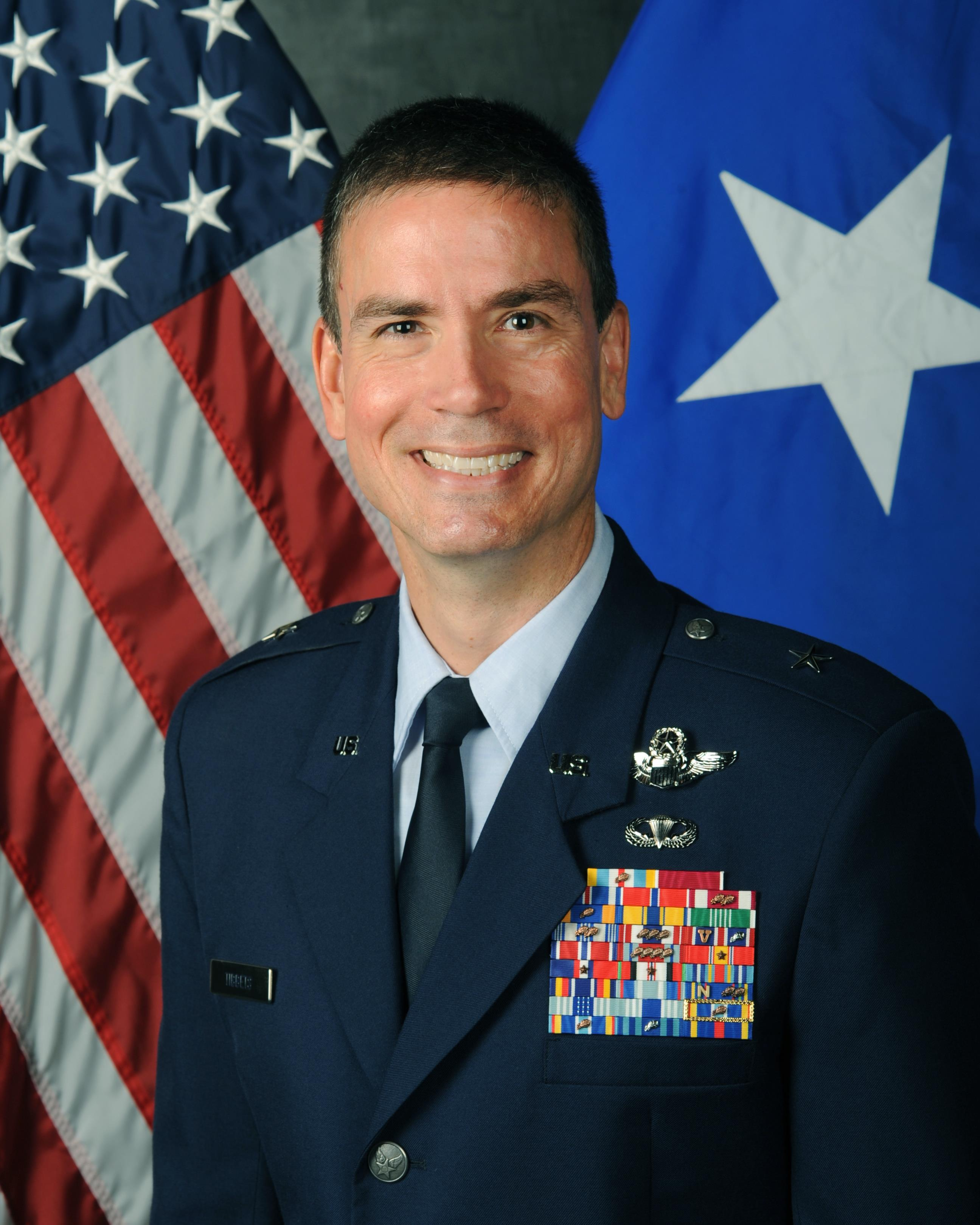
- Official portrait, 2017
- Born: 21 November 1966 (age 59); Montgomery, Alabama, U.S.
- Relatives: Paul Tibbets (grandfather)
- Military career
- Allegiance: United States
- Branch: United States Air Force
- Service years: 1989–2018
- Rank: Brigadier General
- Commands: 509th Bomb Wing; Air Force Inspection Agency; 393d Bomb Squadron
- Conflicts: Operation Allied Force; War in Afghanistan
- Awards: Defense Superior Service Medal (2); Legion of Merit (4); Distinguished Flying Cross; Bronze Star Medal

Paul Warfield Tibbets IV (born 21 November 1966) is a former United States Air Force brigadier general. He is the grandson of Paul W. Tibbets Jr., the pilot of the aircraft that dropped an atomic bomb on Hiroshima in 1945. He was the Deputy Director for Nuclear Operations in the Global Operations Directorate of the United States Strategic Command, where he was responsible for the nuclear mission of the nation's ballistic missile submarines, intercontinental ballistic missiles, and strategic bombers. During his career he participated in Operation Allied Force in the Balkans and Operation Enduring Freedom in Afghanistan, and was one of the few pilots qualified to fly all three of the USAF's strategic bombers: the Rockwell B-1 Lancer, Northrop Grumman B-2 Spirit and the Boeing B-52 Stratofortress. In June 2015, he assumed command of the 509th Bomb Wing. In July 2017, he became Deputy Commander, Air Force Global Strike Command, Barksdale Air Force Base, Louisiana.

== Military career ==
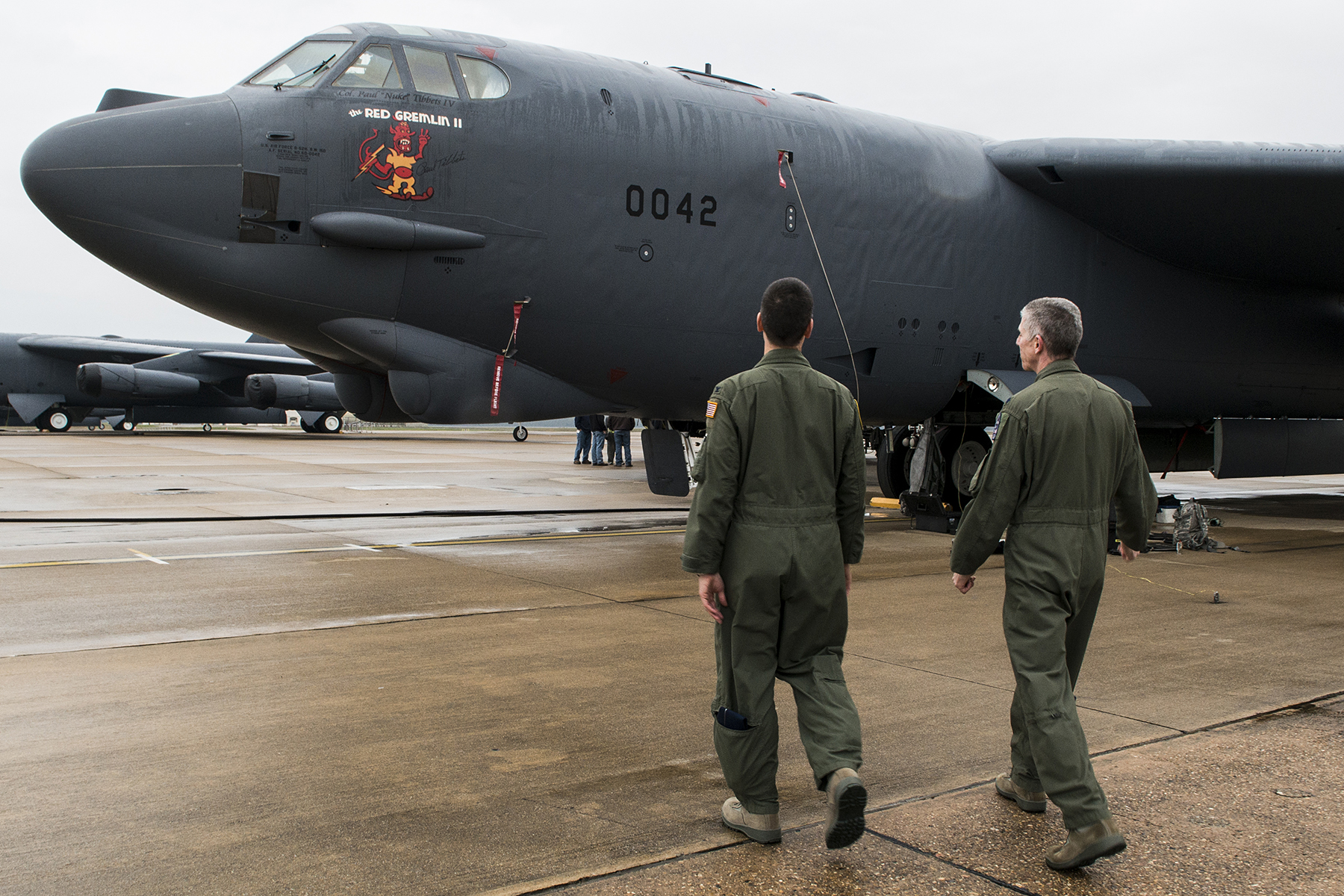
Colonel Paul Tibbets IV (left) looks at the nose art on a 93d Bomb Squadron B-52H Stratofortress at Barksdale Air Force Base, Louisiana, which resembles that of the B-17 Flying Fortress his grandfather piloted during World War II

Paul Warfield Tibbets IV is the grandson of Brigadier General Paul W. Tibbets Jr., the pilot of the aircraft which dropped an atomic bomb on the Japanese city of Hiroshima in 1945, the Enola Gay. He grew up in Montgomery, Alabama, and was inspired to join the United States Air Force (USAF) not by his famous grandfather but by his father, Paul W. Tibbets III, a pharmacist and hospital administrator who served in the United States Army Reserve, retiring as a colonel. "When I was in 9th grade," he recalled "I became involved in youth service projects. It was a passion of mine to serve. My father said 'You seem to be very interested in serving – what do you want to do with your life?' I told him I was interested in serving, and he told me to look into something like the ROTC or service academies."

Tibbets entered the United States Air Force Academy in Colorado Springs, Colorado, from which he graduated in 1989 with a Bachelor of Science degree, majoring in Human Factors Engineering. He was commissioned as a second lieutenant, and was sent to Williams Air Force Base, Arizona, for undergraduate pilot training. He was then selected for training on the B-1 bomber at Dyess Air Force Base, Texas, and was posted to a B-1 squadron, the 37th Bomb Squadron at Ellsworth Air Force Base in South Dakota. "There was no favoritism when I was chosen for bombers," Tibbets recalled, "The Air Force can't afford to put someone in a job for which they're not qualified. I was told that it wasn't because of who I was, but because it was the best fit."

From August to November 1995, Tibbets was trained as a T-38 pilot instructor at Randolph Air Force Base, Texas, and then served as a T-38 instructor with the 394th Combat Training Squadron at Whiteman Air Force Base, Missouri. He attended the Squadron Officer School at Maxwell Air Force Base, Alabama, in 1996, and then qualified on the B-2 Spirit at Whiteman in 1997. In 1999, he flew combat missions over Yugoslavia. For his service in Operation Allied Force, Tibbets was awarded the Distinguished Flying Cross. His citation read:

The President of the United States of America, authorized by Act of Congress, July 2, 1926, takes pleasure in presenting the Distinguished Flying Cross to Captain Paul W. Tibbets IV, United States Air Force, for extraordinary achievement while participating in aerial flight as a B-2 Mission Commander, at or near Yugoslavia, on 8 April 1999. On that date, Captain Tibbets made aviation history by leading the world's first B-2 combat sortie without package support during Operation Allied Force. He displayed exceptional courage, skill, and endurance while flying a 30-hour combat mission, penetrating an advanced integrated air defense system that included an impressive array of ground threats, with no suppression/destruction of enemy air defense or offensive counter-air support available. Using his expert knowledge, Captain Tibbets resolved a system anomaly, which would have inhibited release, within minutes of striking his targets. Employing the new Joint Direct Attack Munition, Captain Tibbets successfully targeted 16 separate impact points and destroyed critical military production facilities including the Smederevo Petroleum Product Storage near Belgrade, a radio relay facility, and an arms production plant in Kragujevac. The professional competence, aerial skill, and devotion to duty displayed by Captain Tibbets reflect great credit upon himself and the United States Air Force.

Tibbets received a Master of Science degree in Human Factors Engineering from the University of Idaho in 2000, and was a non-resident student at the Air Command and Staff College at Maxwell Air Force Base in Alabama in 2001. He attended the United States College of Naval Command and Staff at Newport, Rhode Island, from April 2002 to June 2003, from which he obtained a Master of Arts degree in National Security and Strategic Studies. He returned to Whiteman in July 2003, where he served as a T-38 and B-2 flight examiner, director of operations of the 325th Bomb Squadron and then the 13th Bomb Squadron. He became director of staff of the 509th Bomb Wing there in June 2005, and in April 2006 assumed command of the 393d Bomb Squadron, a unit that had once formed part of the 509th Composite Group which his grandfather had commanded in the Pacific Theater of Operations during World War II.

From October 2007 to August 2009, Tibbets was stationed at NATO headquarters in Brussels. He then attended the Joint Forces Staff College in Norfolk, Virginia in 2009, and the NATO Defense College in Rome in 2010. He was vice Commander of the 379th Air Expeditionary Wing in southwest Asia from June 2010 to July 2011, flying missions in support of Operation Enduring Freedom in Afghanistan. He was in charge of the Air Force Inspection Agency at Kirtland Air Force Base, New Mexico, from July 2011 to July 2013. He then became Deputy Director of Operations of the Air Force Global Strike Command at Barksdale Air Force Base, Louisiana. There, he qualified on the Boeing B-52 Stratofortress, making him one of the few pilots qualified to fly all three of the USAF's strategic bombers: the B-1, B-2 and B-52. In February 2014, he became Deputy Director for Nuclear Operations at the United States Strategic Command, at Offutt Air Force Base in Nebraska, where he was responsible for the nuclear mission of the nation's ballistic missile submarines, intercontinental ballistic missiles, and strategic bombers. On 5 June 2015, he assumed command of the 509th Bomb Wing. In July 2017, he became Deputy Commander, Air Force Global Strike Command, Barksdale Air Force Base, Louisiana.

Tibbets was denied promotion to major general, following an investigation into allegations of his misconduct during his command of the 509th Bomb Wing that included making inappropriate comments regarding women, failure to report suicide attempts under his watch, and inappropriate use of a military vehicle. Tibbets commenced terminal leave on 19 October 2018, and he retired on 1 December 2018.

== Awards and decorations ==
| US Air Force Command Pilot Badge |
| Basic Parachutist Badge |

| Defense Superior Service Medal with one bronze oak leaf cluster |
| Legion of Merit with three oak leaf clusters |
| Distinguished Flying Cross |
| Bronze Star Medal |
| Meritorious Service Medal with two oak leaf clusters |
| Air Medal with oak leaf cluster |
| Air Force Commendation Medal |
| Army Commendation Medal |
| Air Force Achievement Medal with two oak leaf clusters |
| Air Force Meritorious Unit Award with three oak leaf clusters |
| Air Force Outstanding Unit Award with "V" device and silver oak leaf cluster |
| Air Force Organizational Excellence Award |
| Combat Readiness Medal with four oak leaf clusters |
| National Defense Service Medal with one bronze service star |
| Kosovo Campaign Medal with service star |
| Afghanistan Campaign Medal with service star |
| Global War on Terrorism Expeditionary Medal |
| Global War on Terrorism Service Medal |
| Air and Space Campaign Medal |
| Nuclear Deterrence Operations Service Medal with "N" Device and two oak leaf clusters |
| Air Force Overseas Short Tour Service Ribbon |
| Air Force Overseas Long Tour Service Ribbon |
| Air Force Expeditionary Service Ribbon with gold frame and oak leaf cluster |
| Air Force Expeditionary Service Ribbon with oak leaf cluster |
| Air Force Longevity Service Award with one silver and one bronze oak leaf clusters |
| Air Force Training Ribbon |

== Dates of rank ==
| Insignia | Rank | Dates | Source |
|---|---|---|---|
| | Second Lieutenant | 31 May 1989 | |
| | First Lieutenant | 31 May 1991 | |
| | Captain | 31 May 1993 | |
| | Major | 1 August 2000 | |
| | Lieutenant Colonel | 1 April 2004 | |
| | Colonel | 1 September 2008 | |
| | Brigadier General | 12 February 2014 | |

== Notes ==
Military offices
| Preceded by Ferdinand Stoss | Deputy Director for Nuclear Operations of the United States Strategic Command; 2014–2015 | Succeeded by Andrew Gebara |
| Preceded by Glen D. VanHerck | Commander of the 509th Bomb Wing; 2015–2017 | Succeeded by John J. Nichols |
| Preceded by Michael E. Fortney | Deputy Commander of the Air Force Global Strike Command; 2017–2018 | Succeeded by Vito Addabbo |
