= Vito Addabbo =

American major general

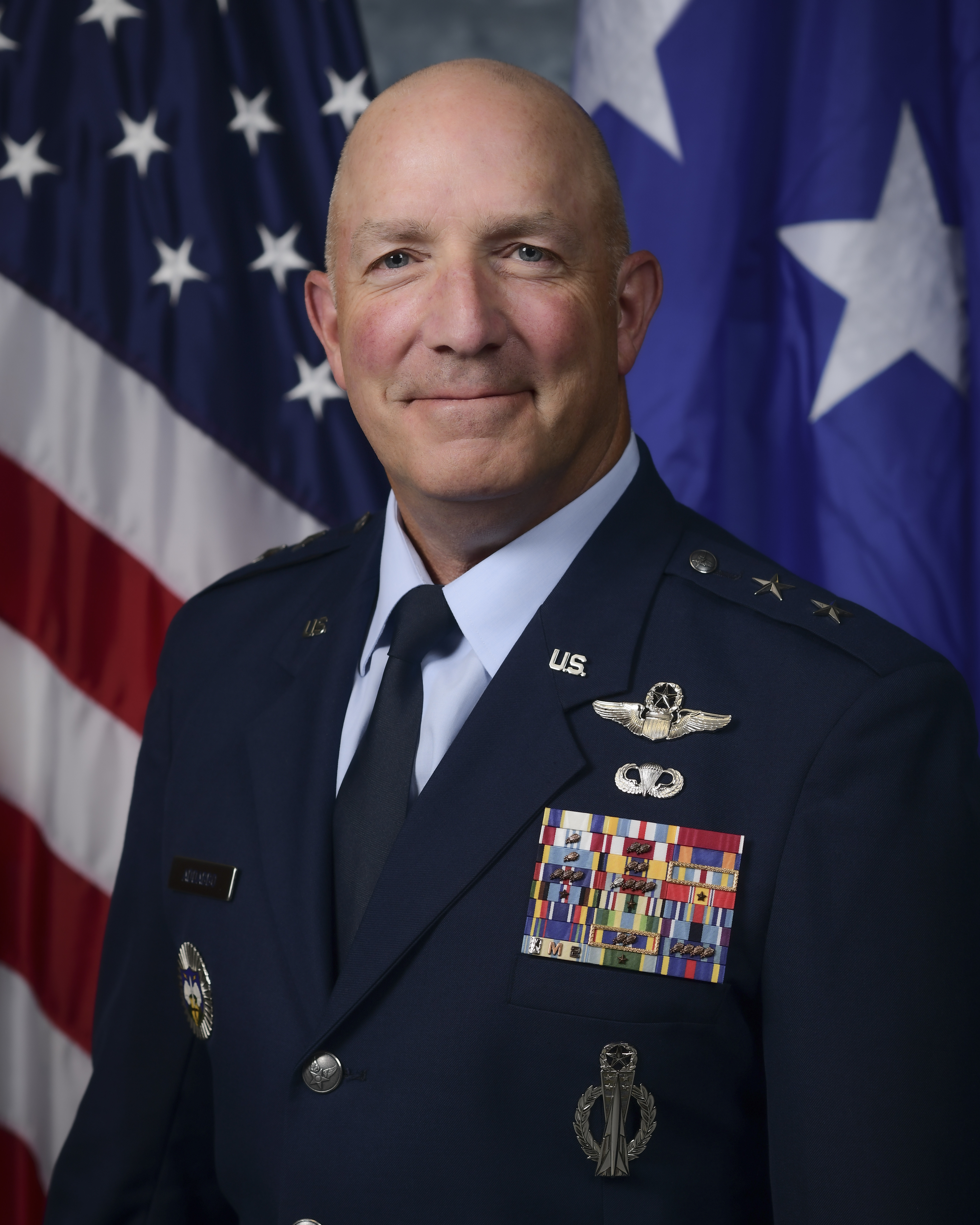
- Born: 17 July 1964 (age 62)
- Military career
- Allegiance: United States
- Branch: United States Air Force
- Service years: 1986–2023
- Rank: Major general
- Commands: 337th Airlift Squadron
- Awards: Legion of Merit

Vito Emil Addabbo (born 17 July 1964) is a retired major general in the United States Air Force. He last served as a special assistant to the commander of the United States Northern Command and North American Aerospace Defense Command for reserve affairs, and prior to that was a mobilization assistant to the commander of Air Force Global Strike Command from October 2019 to December 2020, and previously was its deputy commander. Addabbo was commissioned through the ROTC at the University of Connecticut in 1986.

== Awards and decorations ==
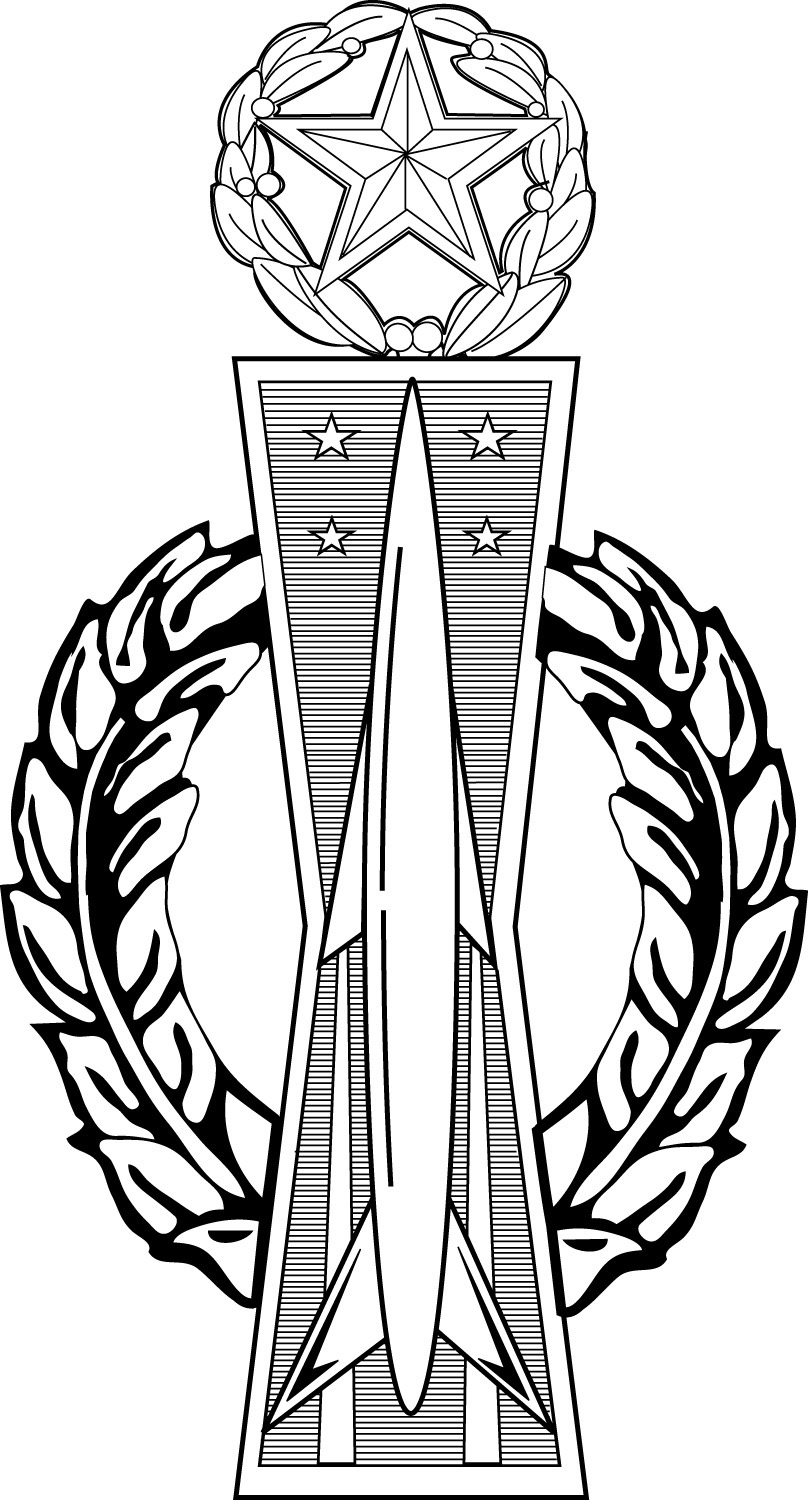
US Air Force Command Pilot Badge
Basic Parachutist Badge
Command Missile Operations Badge

Air Force Distinguished Service Medal
Defense Superior Service Medal
Legion of Merit
Defense Meritorious Service Medal with one bronze oak leaf cluster
Meritorious Service Medal with two oak leaf clusters
Air Medal
Aerial Achievement Medal with oak leaf cluster
Air Force Commendation Medal with two oak leaf clusters
Joint Meritorious Unit Award
Air Force Outstanding Unit Award with three oak leaf clusters
Combat Readiness Medal with one silver and three bronze oak leaf clusters
National Defense Service Medal with one bronze service star
Armed Forces Expeditionary Medal with service star
Southwest Asia Service Medal with service star
Global War on Terrorism Expeditionary Medal
Global War on Terrorism Service Medal
Armed Forces Service Medal
Humanitarian Service Medal
Nuclear Deterrence Operations Service Medal
Air Force Expeditionary Service Ribbon with gold frame and two oak leaf clusters
Air Force Longevity Service Award with four oak leaf clusters
Armed Forces Reserve Medal with silver Hourglass device, "M" device and bronze award numeral 2
Small Arms Expert Marksmanship Ribbon with service star
Air Force Training Ribbon

Military offices
Preceded by Paul W. Tibbets IV	Deputy Commander of the Air Force Global Strike Command; 2019	Succeeded by Anthony J. Cotton
Preceded by ???	Mobilization Assistant to the Commander, Air Force Global Strike Command; 2019–2020	Succeeded by Erich C. Novak
