= 393rd Bomb Squadron =

US Air Force unit

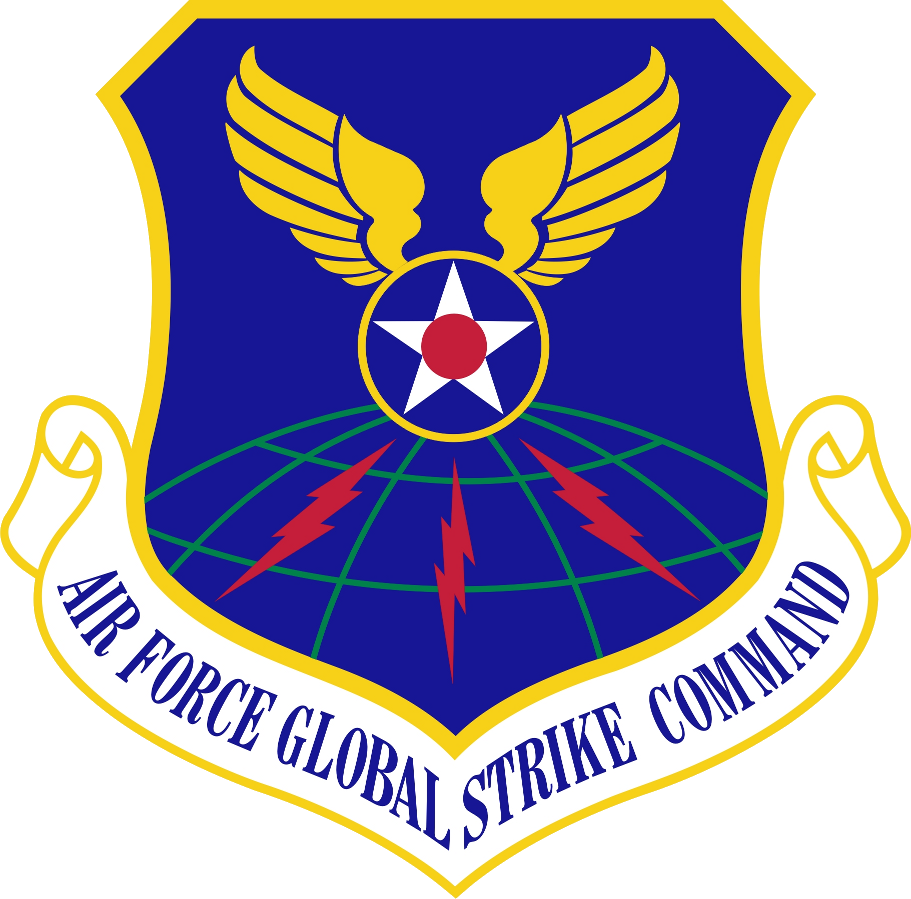
393rd Bomb Squadron

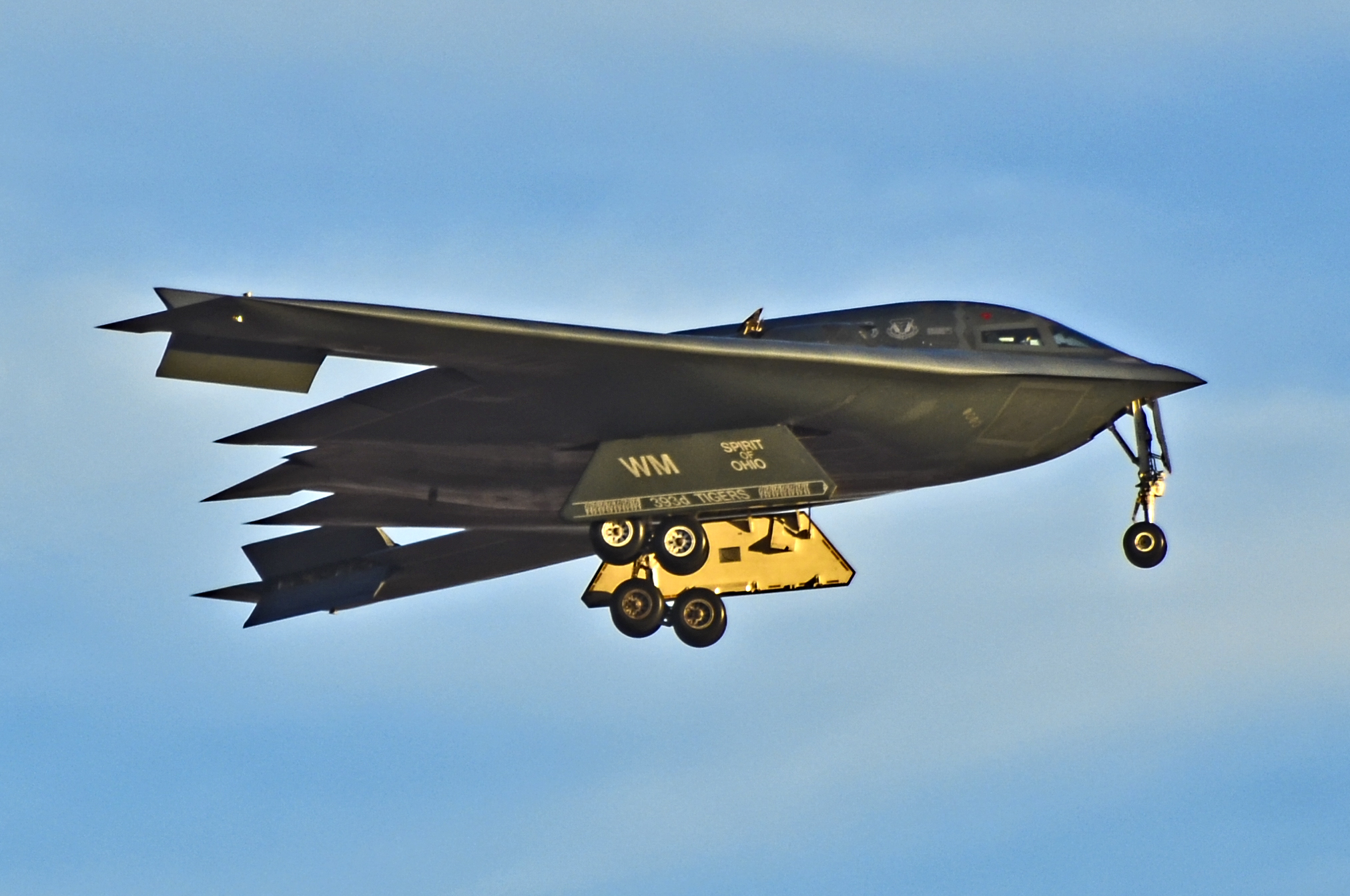
- 393rd Bomb Squadron B-2 Spirit on approach for landing (Note: Aircraft is Northrop Grumman B-2 Spirit AV-5, serial 82-1070 Spirit of Ohio during a Red Flag Exercise at Nellis Air Force Base, Nevada. Del Coro, Tomás (27 January 2017). "Red Flag, Nellis AFB, NV - Northrop Grumman B-2 Spirit AV-5 82-1070 Spirit of Ohio - 393d Bomb Squadron "Tigers"". Flickr.)
- Active: 1944–1990; 1993–present
- Country: United States
- Branch: United States Air Force
- Role: Strategic Bombing
- Part of: Air Force Global Strike Command
- Garrison/HQ: Whiteman Air Force Base, Missouri
- Engagements: Pacific Theater; Vietnam War; Kosovo War; Global war on terrorism
- Decorations: Air Force Outstanding Unit Award with Combat "V" Device; Air Force Meritorious Unit Award}Air Force Outstanding Unit Award; Republic of Vietnam Gallantry Cross with Palm

Commanders
- Notable commanders: Paul W. Tibbets; Charles W. Sweeney; Paul W. Tibbets IV

Insignia
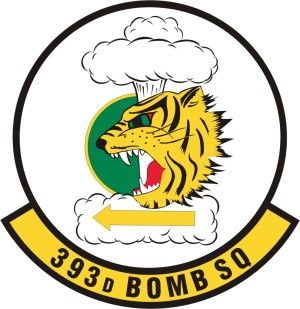
- 393rd Bomb Squadron emblem (Note: Approved 15 July 1957. Description: Over a green disc edged Air Force golden yellow, a mushroom shaped atomic cloud issuing from a blast, white, all surmounted by a snarling tiger's head in profile, proper (Air Force golden yellow with black stripes, white teeth, red tongue and eyeball, green iris and black pupil); on the blast below the atomic cloud, disc, and tiger's head, an arrow of the second [color] pointing to dexter, all outlines and details black throughout. This emblem was modified to place all elements on a white disc, most recently on 12 July 2007.)

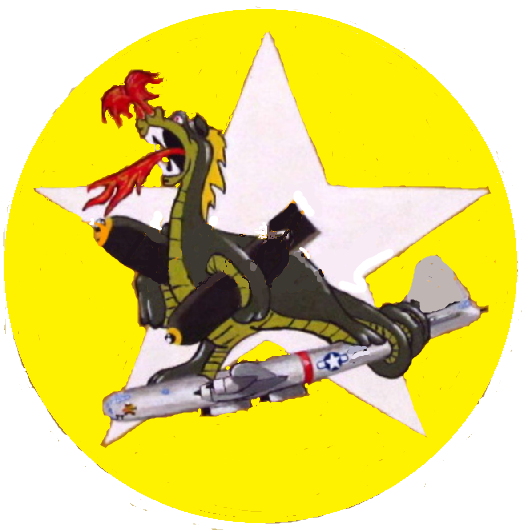
- 393rd Bombardment Squadron emblem (Note: Approved 19 December 1944.)

The 393rd Bomb Squadron (Note: Officially, the 393d Bomb Squadron. AF Instruction 38-101, Manpower and Organization, 28 August 2019, Figure 28.1.) is part of the 509th Bomb Wing at Whiteman Air Force Base, Missouri. It operates Northrop Grumman B-2 Spirit nuclear-capable strategic bomber aircraft.

The squadron was first organized in March 1944 as the 393rd Bombardment Squadron. In November 1944, the squadron transferred to the 509th Composite Group and began training for the delivery of nuclear weapons. In May 1945, it deployed to the Mariana Islands, where it became the only unit to use nuclear weapons in combat, when its aircraft dropped atomic bombs on Hiroshima and Nagasaki on 6 August 1945 and 9 August 1945. After V-J Day, the squadron returned to the United States, and was stationed at Roswell Army Air Field, New Mexico.

During the early years of the Cold War, the squadron was involved in Operation Crossroads, nuclear weapons testing on Bikini Atoll, and has continued to operate nuclear-capable aircraft since then. At Roswell, the squadron upgraded to Boeing B-50 Superfortresses and later, to jet powered Boeing B-47 Stratojets. In 1958, the squadron and its B-47s moved to Pease Air Force Base, New Hampshire. At Pease, it replaced its B-47s with Boeing B-52 Stratofortresses in 1966, and in 1970, became one of only two wings in Strategic Air Command to equip with the General Dynamics FB-111.

With the phaseout of the FB-111 and closure of Pease, the squadron was inactivated in 1990. It was activated at Whiteman Air Force Base, Missouri in 1993, where it began to receive Northrop Grumman B-2 Spirit stealth bombers and became operational as the only regular Air Force unit to operate these aircraft.

== Mission ==
The squadron provides worldwide combat capability with a force of 20 Northrop Grumman B-2 Spirit aircraft, aircrew and operations personnel in support of Joint Chiefs of Staff nuclear and conventional taskings.

== History ==
=== World War II ===
The Enola Gay returning to its hard stand after the strike on Hiroshima

The 393rd Bombardment Squadron (Note: The squadron is not related to the 393rd Bombardment Squadron, which was redesignated the 6th Antisubmarine Squadron before being disbanded in November 1943. Maurer, Combat Squadrons, pp. 37-38.) was activated at Dalhart Army Air Field in March 1944 as one of the original squadrons of the 504th Bombardment Group, moving to Fairmont Army Air Field, the following day to train as a Boeing B-29 Superfortress squadron. Due to a shortage of B-29s, the squadron initially trained with Boeing B-17 Flying Fortresses. The squadron began to receive B-29s later in 1944.

In September 1944, the squadron moved to Wendover Field, Utah, although it remained assigned to the 504th Group (which continued its training at Fairmont) until November, when it was assigned directly to Headquarters, Second Air Force. When the 509th Composite Group was formed at Wendover in December, it became the group's only bombardment squadron. The first three Silverplate B-29s, modified to carry atomic bombs arrived in October, with the squadron building up to fourteen bombers. These planes had been modified by Martin Aircraft at its plant in Omaha, Nebraska. The 393rd completed its training and left Wendover in late April 1945.

It arrived at North Field (Tinian) in late May 1945, flying non-combat missions practicing atomic bomb delivery techniques during June and July. For security reasons, the squadron's B-29s carried the tail codes of other B-29 groups. (Note: The Enola Gay carried the Circle R of the 6th Bombardment Group, while the Bockscar used the Triangle N of the 444th Bombardment Group. Postwar, these were changed to an arrow in a circle. Campbell, pp. 19, 191-92)

The squadron flew its first atomic mission on 6 August 1945, when the Enola Gay, piloted by the 509th Group Commander, Colonel Paul W. Tibbets, dropped the bomb known as Little Boy on Hiroshima. Three days later, the Bockscar, flown by the squadron commander, Major Charles W. Sweeney, released the bomb named Fat Man on Nagasaki. The squadron is the only unit to ever deliver nuclear weapons in combat. In October, the squadron departed Tinian for the United States.

=== Cold War ===
==== Superfortress operations ====
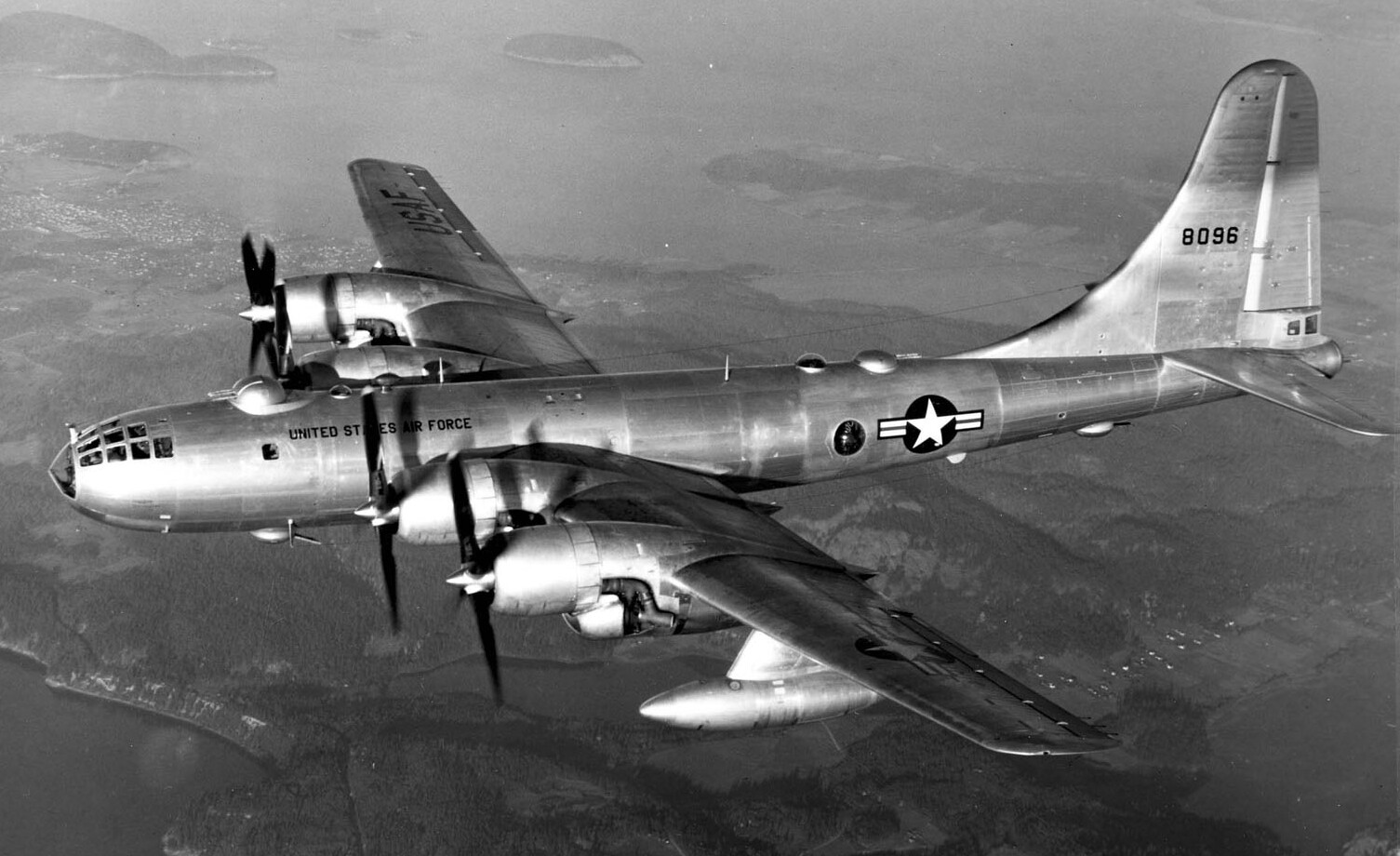
B-50 Superfortress as flown by the squadron (Note: Aircraft is Boeing B-50D-95-BO Superfortress, serial 48-096. Dirkx, Marco (18 March 2024). "1948 USAF Serial Numbers". Joe Baugher’s Serial Number List.)

The squadron arrived at Roswell Army Air Field in November 1945. In March 1946, it became part of Strategic Air Command (SAC). The squadron deployed to Kwajalein Airfield from May to July 1946 to participate in Operation Crossroads, a series of atomic bomb tests on Bikini Atoll in the Marshall Islands. As part of the organizational trials leading to the implementation of the wing base organization system, from November 1947 to September 1948, all bomber and fighter units at Roswell, including the 393rd, were attached to the 509th Bombardment Wing for operational control.

The squadron began upgrading to the new Boeing B-50 Superfortress, an improved version of the B-29, designed for nuclear weapons delivery, in 1949. The squadron deployed with its B-50s to RAF Mildenhall, England from 4 June to 2 September 1952, and to Andersen Air Force Base, Guam from 18 June to about 18 September 1953 and from 10 July to 8 October 1954.

SAC’s mobilization for the Korean War highlighted that SAC wing commanders focused too much on running the base organization and not enough time on overseeing combat preparations. Under the plan implemented in February 1951 and finalized in June 1952, the wing commander focused primarily on the combat units and the maintenance necessary to support combat aircraft by having the combat and maintenance squadrons report directly to the wing and eliminating the intermediate group structures. This resulted in the squadron being reassigned directly to the 509th Bombardment Wing.

==== B-47 Stratojet operations ====
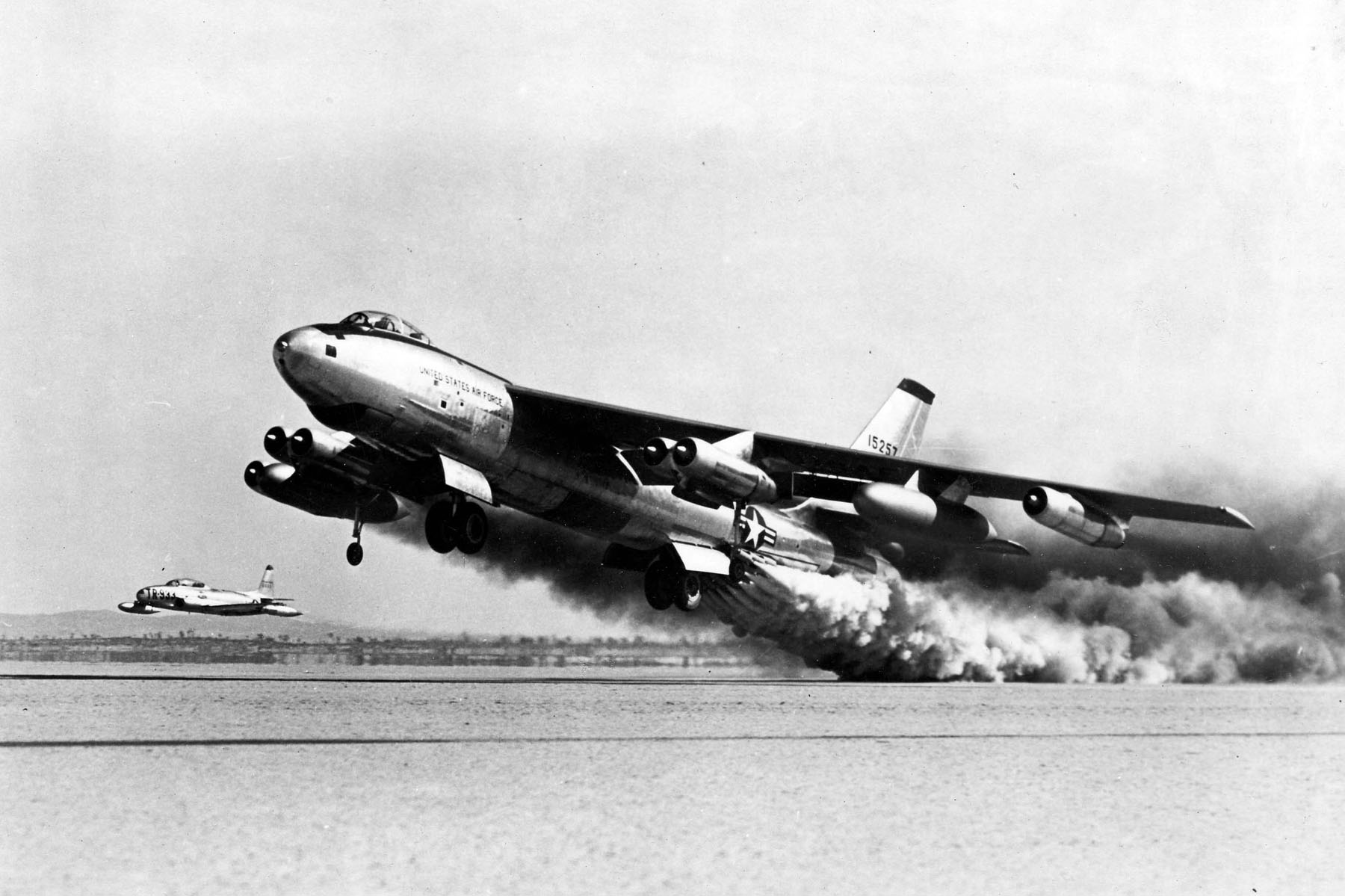
B-47 Stratojet as flown by the squadron

The squadron received new, swept-wing Boeing B-47 Stratojets in 1955 It deployed to RAF Upper Heyford from 26 January to 30 April 1956. Although it did not deploy overseas again as a unit, the squadron provided planes and crews for Operation Reflex. Reflex placed Stratojets and Boeing KC-97s at bases closer to the Soviet Union for 90 day periods, although individuals rotated back to home bases during unit Reflex deployments.

In July 1958, the squadron and its parent 509th Wing moved from Walker to Pease Air Force Base, New Hampshire. From 1958, SAC's B-47 Stratojet squadrons began to assume an alert posture at their home bases, reducing the amount of time spent on alert at overseas bases. General Thomas S. Power’s set an initial goal of maintaining one third of SAC's planes on fifteen minute ground alert, fully fueled and ready for combat to reduce vulnerability to a Soviet missile strike. This was increased to half the squadron's aircraft in 1962.

Soon after detection of Soviet missiles in Cuba in October 1962, SAC brought all degraded and adjusted alert sorties up to full capability. On 22 October, the squadron's B-47s were dispersed. Most dispersal bases were civilian airfields with AF Reserve or Air National Guard units. B-47s were configured for execution of the Emergency War Order as soon as possible after dispersal. On 24 October SAC went to DEFCON 2, placing all squadron aircraft on alert. On 15 November 1/6 of the squadron's dispersed B-47s were recalled to Pease. On 21 November SAC went to DEFCON 3. The remainder of the 393rd's dispersed B-47s were recalled on 24 November. On 27 November SAC returned to normal alert posture.

==== B-52 Stratofortress operations ====
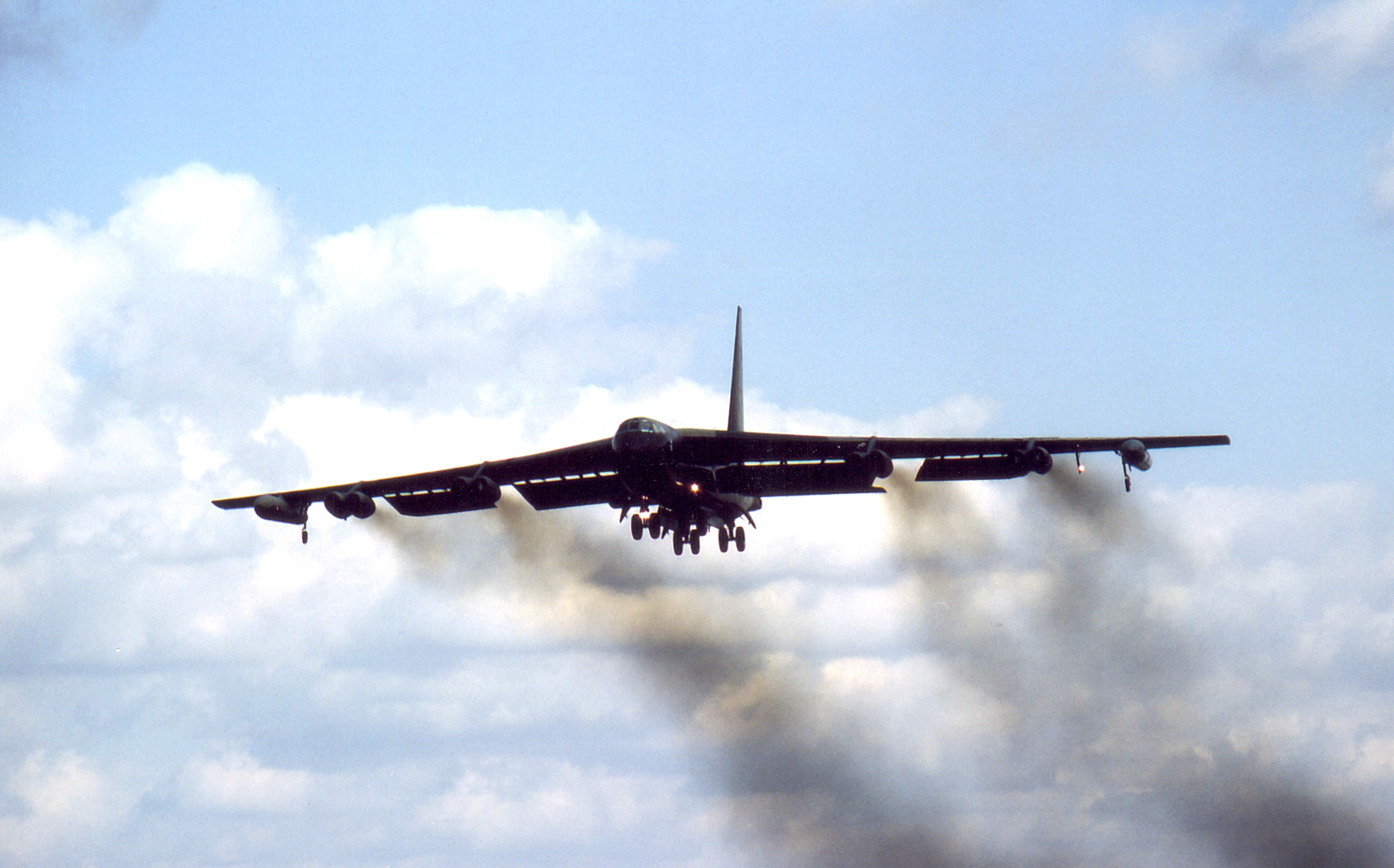
B-52D as flown by the squadron

With the loss of its B-47s, the squadron began to phase down in preparation for inactivation in late 1965. This decision was reversed, and the squadron received Boeing B-52 Stratofortresses in 1966. It rotated aircraft and crews to support Operation Arc Light operations starting in December 1966 and continuing until September 1969. As SAC participation in the Vietnam War increased, so did the demand for its aircraft, aircrew, and support personnel. By 1968, the number of SAC aircraft on alert had decreased to 40 per cent (Note: This alert status was not uniform through the command. Wings committed to Arc Light had no alert bombers, while undeployed wings maintained normal alert status. Which category a specific wing fell into varied over time. Alert Operations and SAC, pp. 24-25) Even when planes were available for alert, when squadron crews rotated to the combat zone they could not be manned.

Even as the squadron was converting to B-52s, Robert S. McNamara, Secretary of Defense, announced a phaseout program that would reduce SAC’s bomber force. This program called for the mid-1971 retirement of all B-52Cs, and of several subsequent B-52 models." In November 1969, the squadron transferred its last B-52 out and again became non-operational. However, it continued to supply B-52 aircrew for Southeast Asia operations, while preparing for receipt of General Dynamics FB-111 Aardvarks.

==== FB-111 Aardvark operations ====
A 509th Wing FB-111A dropping Mark 82 high drag bombs

Although non-operational, the squadron performed training on the FB-111 Aardvark, which was designed to replace the Convair B-58 Hustler and improve mission flexibility. The FB-111 was considered an interim bomber until the next-generation bomber became available. In December 1970, the 393rd began operations with the FB-111 and resumed alert operations on 1 July 1971. From 1982 through 1983, crews from the 509th Wing won the Fairchild Trophy as the best unit in SAC in bombing and navigation. It also won the LeMay Trophy for the best high and low altitude bombing in 1981 and 1989. (Note: These trophies were awarded during SAC's bombing and navigation competition, Exercise Giant Voice. Crews from the 393rd and its sister squadron, the 715th Bombardment Squadron, represented the 509th Wing in these competitions. Colin.)

As the FB-111 was withdrawn from SAC's inventory, the squadron was inactivated on 30 September 1990.

=== Stealth operations ===
The squadron was reactivated at Whiteman Air Force Base, Missouri in August 1993. It became the first operational Northrop Grumman B-2 Spirit stealth bomber squadron, receiving its first B-2, the Spirit of Missouri, on 17 December. The squadron flew its first combat mission in 1999 when two B-2s attacked targets in support of Operation Allied Force. The squadron flew missions from Whiteman to the Former Republic of Yugoslavia, and during the first eight weeks of air combat was responsible for destroying one third of all Serbian targets.

After the September 11 attacks, the squadron participated in Operation Enduring Freedom by flying a world record 44 hour sortie to attack targets in Afghanistan. It made its first combat deployment in March 2003, during Operation Iraq Freedom, when it not only flew sorties from Whiteman, but also from an undisclosed forward location. Since 2005, the squadron has regularly rotated planes and crews to Andersen Air Force Base, Guam as part of Asia-Pacific bomber presence. From April 2006 to October 2007, Lt Col Paul W. Tibbets IV, the grandson of Paul W, Tibbets, Jr., the pilot of the Enola Gay and a previous commander of the squadron, commanded the 393rd.

In October 2008, the 131st Bomb Wing of the Missouri Air National Guard moved from Lambert Field Air National Guard Base to Whiteman, where it became an associate unit of the 509th Wing. The 131st had been preparing for its transition since 2007 and ten of its pilots were already qualified on the B-2. Its 110th Bomb Squadron became an associate of the 393rd, operating the same aircraft.

B-2 Spirit bombers departing and returning during Operation Midnight Hammer

On 21 June 2025, the squadron and associated Guardsmen of the 110th launched seven B-2 Spirit stealth bombers to strike two Iranian nuclear facilities in Operation Midnight Hammer. The operation was the largest operational employment of the B-2 Spirit and the first combat use of the GBU-57 Massive Ordnance Penetrator. The mission delivered 14 precision-guided weapons against hardened underground targets without loss. While the attack sorties were launched eastward from Whiteman, another group of squadron planes flew westward to Andersen Air Force Base, Guam in a diversion that was publicly tracked. This mission earned the 509th Wing the Jimmy Doolittle Trophy from the Air Force Historical Foundation for superior unit performance. In February 2026, squadron B-2s were again used to strike hardened targets in Iran, bombing hardened missile sites as part of Operation Epic Fury.

On 10 June 2026, the B-2 Spirit Spirit of Texas arrived in Australia as part of a Bomber Task Force rotation built around Exercise Diamond Storm. The operation served to test the range and integration capabilities of United States strategic airpower within the Indo-Pacific region. (Note: Exercise Diamond Storm is the Australian equivalent of Exercise Red Flag. It is held every two years and marks the high-intensity finale of the Royal Australian Air Force’s Air Warfare Instructor Course. Duncan.) Spirits have made similar deployments to Royal Australian Air Force stations in northern Australia in 2022 and 2024. Each visit makes the same point: that America can base its long-range striking power in northern Australia, and that the two air forces can fight as a single team.

== Lineage ==
- Constituted as the 393d Bombardment Squadron, Very Heavy on 28 February 1944

Activated on 11 March 1944
Redesignated 393d Bombardment Squadron, Medium on 2 July 1948
Redesignated 393d Bombardment Squadron, Heavy on 2 April 1966
Redesignated 393d Bombardment Squadron, Medium on 1 December 1969
Inactivated on 30 September 1990
Redesignated 393d Bomb Squadron on 12 March 1993
Activated on 27 August 1993

=== Assignments ===
- 504th Bombardment Group, 11 March 1944
- Second Air Force, 25 November 1944
- 509th Composite Group (later 509th Bombardment Group), 17 December 1944 (attached to 509th Bombardment Wing, 17 November 1947 – 1 August 1948, 1 August 1948 – 14 September 1948 and after 1 February 1951)
- 509th Bombardment Wing, 16 June 1952 – 30 September 1990
- 509th Operations Group, 27 August 1993– present

=== Stations ===
- Dalhart Army Air Field, Texas, 11 March 1944
- Fairmont Army Air Field, Nebraska, 12 March 1944
- Wendover Field, Utah, 14 September 1944 – 26 April 1945
- North Field, Tinian, 30 May–17 October 1945
- Roswell Army Air Field (later Walker Air Force Base), New Mexico, 6 November 1945 (deployed to Kwajalein Airfield, Marshall Islands, 1 May–1 July 1946; RAF Mildenhall, England, 4 June–2 September 1952; Andersen Air Force Base, Guam, 18 June–c. 18 September 1953 (Note: Probably attached to Twentieth Air Force. Haulman.) and 10 July–8 October 1954; RAF Upper Heyford, England, 26 January–30 April 1956
- Pease Air Force Base, New Hampshire, 1 July 1958 – 30 September 1990
- Whiteman Air Force Base, Missouri, 27 August 1993 – present

=== Aircraft ===
- Boeing B-17 Flying Fortress (1944)
- Boeing B-29 Superfortress (1944–1952)
- Boeing B-50 Superfortress (1949–1955)
- Boeing B-47 Stratojet (1955–1965)
- Boeing B-52 Stratofortress (1966–1969)
- General Dynamics FB-111A Aardvark (1970–1990)
- Northrop Grumman B-2 Spirit (1993–present)

=== Awards and campaigns ===
Award streamer	Award	Dates	Notes
	Air Force Meritorious Unit Award	1 June 2005–31 May 2007	393rd Bomb Squadron
	Air Force Meritorious Unit Award	1 June 2007–31 May 2008	393rd Bomb Squadron
	Air Force Meritorious Unit Award	1 June 2008–31 May 2009	393rd Bomb Squadron
	Air Force Meritorious Unit Award	1 June 2009–31 May 2010	393rd Bomb Squadron
	Air Force Meritorious Unit Award	1 June 2010–31 May 2011	393rd Bomb Squadron
	Air Force Meritorious Unit Award	1 January 2013–31 December 2013	393rd Bomb Squadron
	Air Force Outstanding Unit Award with Combat "V" Device	1 July 1945–14 August 1945	393rd Bombardment Squadron
	Air Force Outstanding Unit Award with Combat "V" Device	15 March 2003–16 April 2003	393rd Expeditionary Bomb Squadron (Note: Expeditionary units are deemed separate units by the Air Force. When a regular unit is the major force provider for an expeditionary unit, the expeditionary unit takes its name from the major force provider, which is entitled to any honors earned by the expeditionary unit. AF Instruction 38-101, Manpower and Organization, 29 August 2019, para. 31.4.)
	Air Force Outstanding Unit Award	1 April 1968–1 October 1968	393rd Bombardment Squadron
	Air Force Outstanding Unit Award	1 July 1977–30 June 1979	393rd Bombardment Squadron
	Air Force Outstanding Unit Award	1 July 1981–30 June 1982	393rd Bombardment Squadron
	Air Force Outstanding Unit Award	1 July 1982–30 June 1984	393rd Bombardment Squadron
	Air Force Outstanding Unit Award	1 July 1988–30 June 1990	393rd Bombardment Squadron
	Air Force Outstanding Unit Award	1 June 1995–31 May 1997	393rd Bomb Squadron
	Air Force Outstanding Unit Award	1 June 1997–31 May 1999	393rd Bomb Squadron
	Air Force Outstanding Unit Award	1 June 1999–31 May 2001	393rd Bomb Squadron
	Air Force Outstanding Unit Award	1 June 2003–31 May 2005	393rd Bomb Squadron
	Air Force Outstanding Unit Award	1 January 2015–31 December 2015	393rd Bomb Squadron
	Air Force Outstanding Unit Award	1 January 2018–31 December 2018	393rd Bomb Squadron
	Air Force Outstanding Unit Award	1 January 2019–31 December 2019	393rd Bomb Squadron
	Air Force Outstanding Unit Award	1 January 2022–31 December 2022	393rd Bomb Squadron
	Air Force Outstanding Unit Award	1 January 2024–31 December 2024	393rd Bomb Squadron
	Vietnamese Gallantry Cross with Palm	5 March 1969–14 October 1969	393rd Bombardment Squadron

Campaign Streamer	Campaign	Dates	Notes
	American Theater without inscription	11 March 1944–26 April 1945	393rd Bombardment Squadron
	Air Offensive, Japan	30 May 1945–2 September 1945	393rd Bombardment Squadron
	Eastern Mandates	June 1945-July 1945	393rd Bombardment Squadron (Note: Awarded outside of dates of campaign for actual combat operations. Maurer, Combat Squarons, p. 802.)
	Western Pacific	30 May 1945–2 September 1945	393rd Bombardment Squadron
	Air Campaign	24 March 1999–10 June 1999	393rd Bomb Squadron
	Global War on Terror Service Medal	11 September 2001–	393rd Bomb Squadron

== See also ==
- Atomic bombings of Hiroshima and Nagasaki
- List of B-52 Units of the United States Air Force
- List of B-47 units of the United States Air Force
- List of B-50 units of the United States Air Force
- List of B-29 Superfortress operators
- B-17 Flying Fortress units of the United States Army Air Forces
