= 509th Bomb Wing =

US Air Force unit

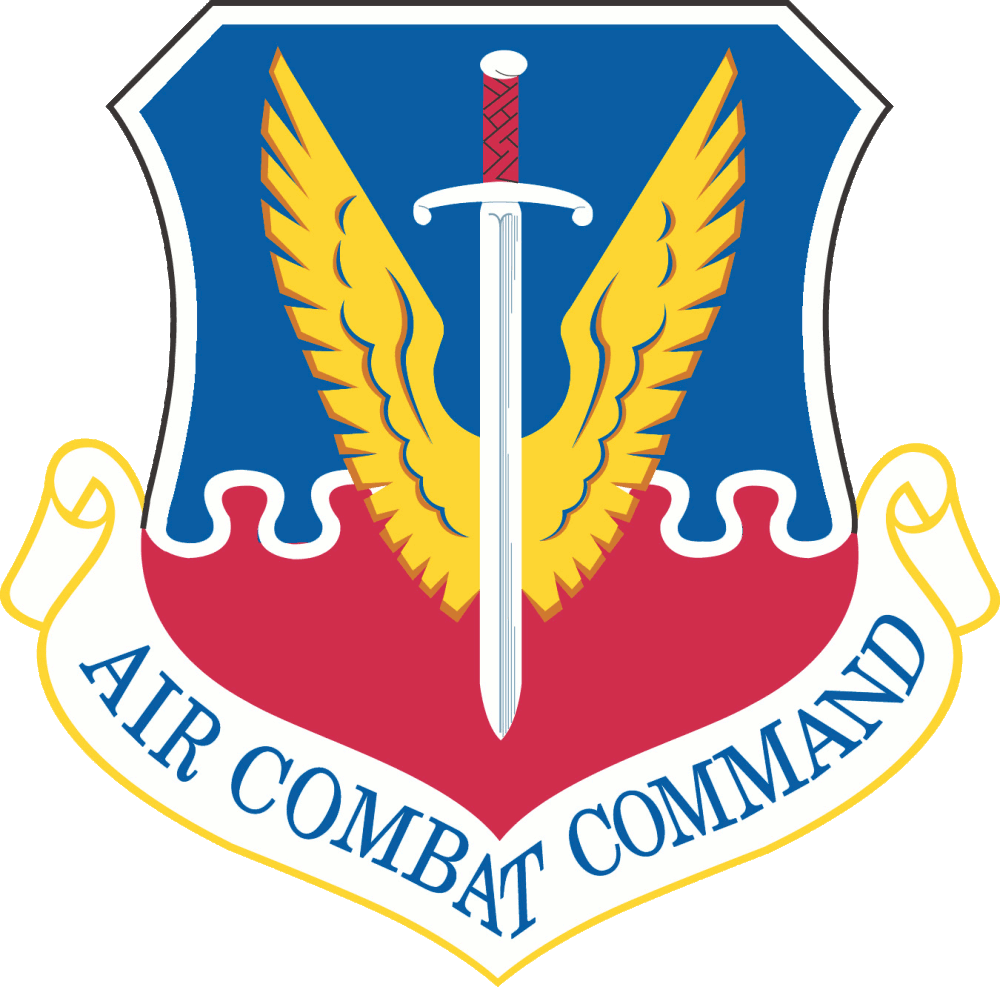
509th Bomb Wing

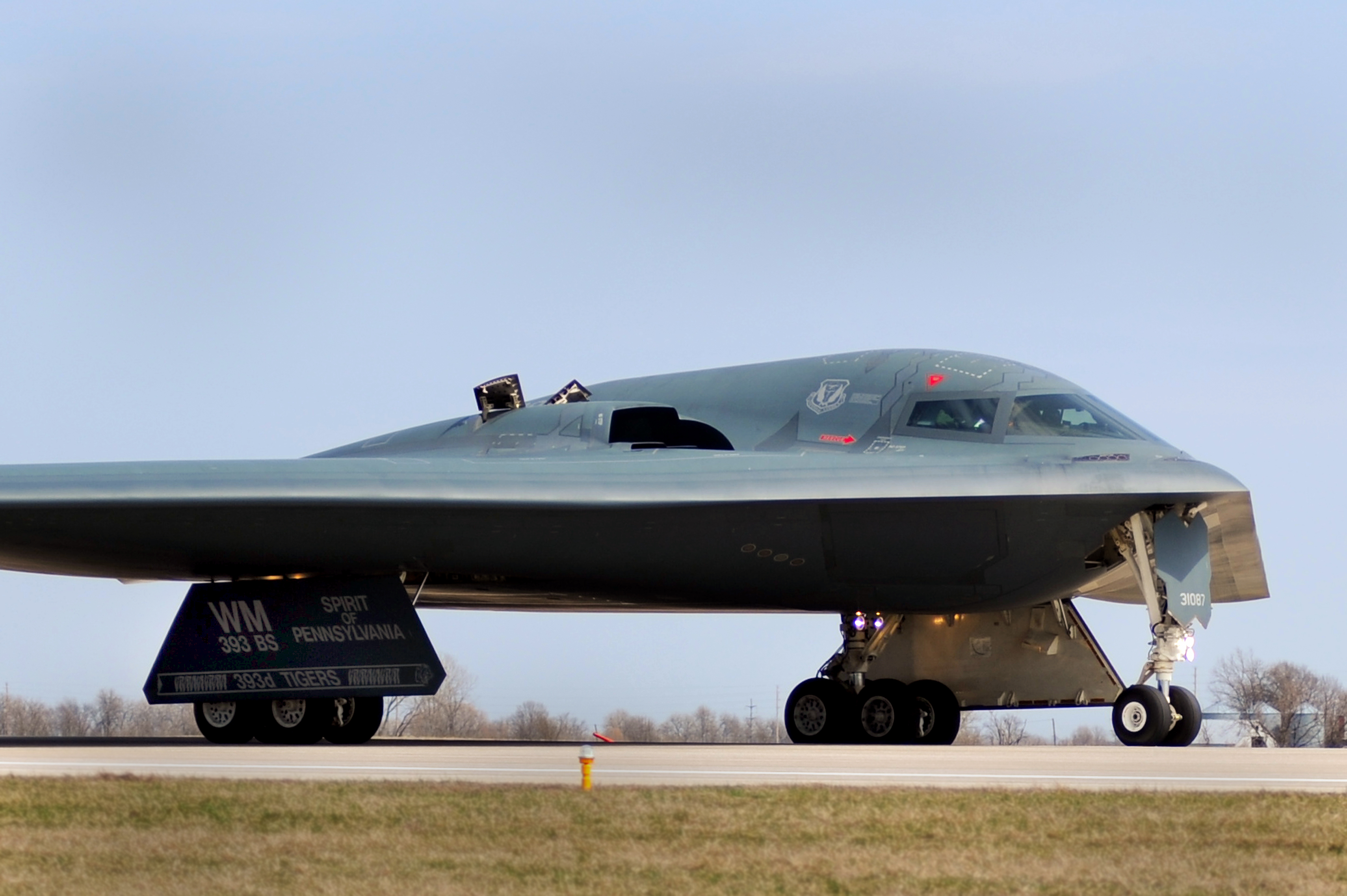
- B-2A Spirit returns from a mission as part of Joint Task Force Odyssey Dawn (Note: Aircraft is Northrop B-2A Block 30 Spirit, serial 93-0087 Spirit of Pennsylvania. Joint Task Force Odyssey Dawn supported the no-fly zone over Libya. Picture taken 20 March 2011.)
- Active: 1947–1948; 1948–present; (78 years, 11 months)
- Country: United States
- Branch: United States Air Force
- Role: Bombardment
- Part of: Air Combat Command
- Garrison/HQ: Whiteman Air Force Base
- Motto: Defensor Vindex (Latin for 'Defender Avenger')
- Engagements: Kosovo War Twelve-Day War
- Decorations: Air Force Meritorious Unit Award; Air Force Outstanding Unit Award

Commanders
- Current commander: Colonel Josh Wiitala
- Vice Commander: Colonel Timothy Griffith
- Command Chief: Chief Master Sergeant Olatokunbo O. Olopade
- Notable commanders: Paul Tibbets; John A. Dramesi; John Dale Ryan; Gregory A. Biscone

Insignia
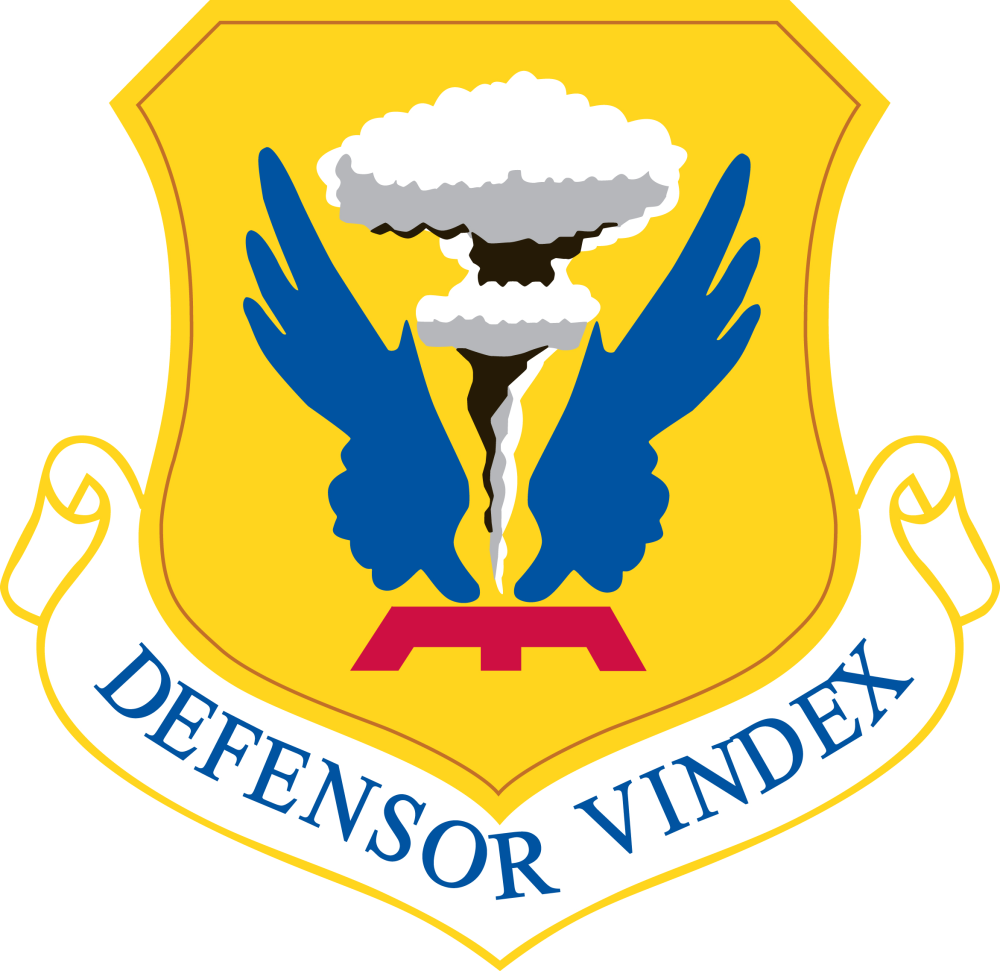
- 509th Bomb Wing emblem (Note: Approved 10 July 1952. Description: Or, in base a label Gules of three, surmounted by an atomic cloud Proper, between a pair of wings Azure; all with a diminished bordure of the first [color]. The Air Force wings represent the branch of service but are not in the familiar outstretched position. When the ancient Greeks approached a stranger, they raised their arms with palms outward to show they were carrying no weapons – a sign of peace. The wings in this configuration to show that the wing comes in peace. The atomic cloud burst represents two things: that the 509th is the only unit to ever drop atomic bombs in wartime and that it still uses atomic power as a deterrent to war and defender of peace. Finally, the 'eldest son' symbol (the red 'tripod') shows that the wing is the oldest atomic trained military unit in the world.)
- Tail code: WM

Aircraft flown
- Bomber: KB-29M B-47E B-52D FB-111A KC-135R B-2A
- Trainer: T-38C

The 509th Bomb Wing (509 BW) is a United States Air Force unit assigned to the Air Force Global Strike Command, Eighth Air Force. It is stationed at Whiteman Air Force Base, Missouri.

The 509 BW is the host unit at Whiteman, and operates the B-2 Spirit stealth bomber. The wing can launch combat sorties directly from Missouri to any spot on the globe, engaging adversaries with large payloads of traditional or precision-guided munitions.

The wing's 509th Operations Group can trace its heritage back to the 509th Composite Group, when during WW2, two of its B-29 Superfortress bombers dropped the two atomic bombs that helped end the war in the Pacific theatre.

The 509th BW led the way North America's first military response following the September 11 attacks in 2001. Its B-2 bombers were the first U.S. aircraft to enter Afghan airspace in October 2001, paving the way for other coalition aircraft to engage Taliban and Al Qaeda forces. During this operation, the aircraft flew roundtrip from Missouri, logging combat missions in excess of 40 hours—the longest on record.

== Units ==
- 509th Operations Group

13th Bomb Squadron
393d Bomb Squadron
509th Operations Support Squadron

- 509th Maintenance Group

709th Munitions Squadron
509th Munitions Squadron
509th Maintenance Operations Squadron
509th Maintenance Squadron
509th Aircraft Maintenance Squadron (inactivated 2024)
393rd Bomber Generation Squadron (activated 2024)

- 509th Mission Support Group

509th Force Support Squadron
509th Civil Engineer Squadron
509th Logistics Readiness Squadron
509th Security Forces Squadron
509th Contracting Squadron
509th Communications Squadron

- 509th Medical Group

509th Medical Operations Squadron
509th Medical Support Squadron

== History ==
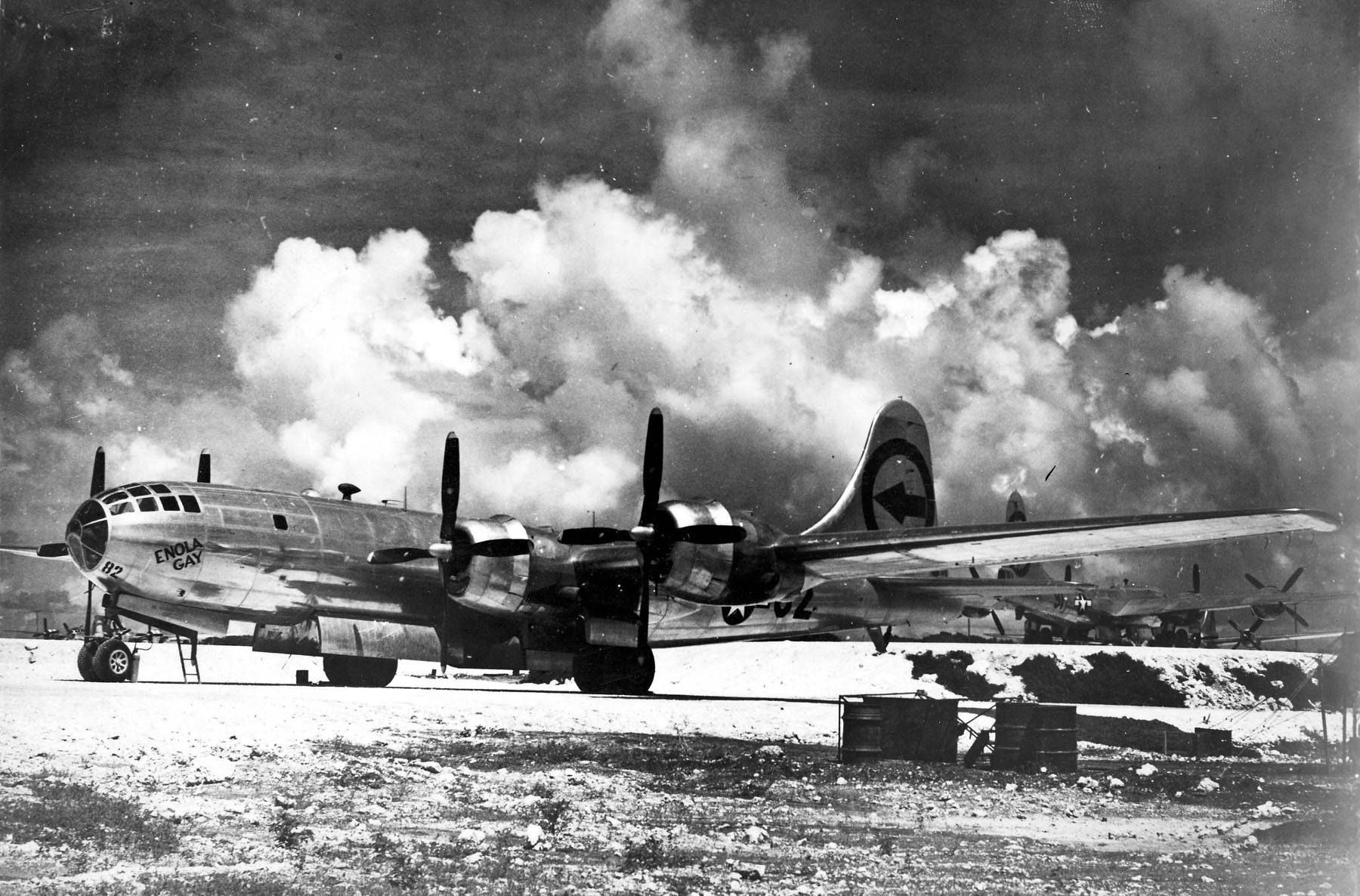
B-29 Superfortress "Enola Gay" during WW2

=== World War II ===
The wing's 509th Operations Group is a direct descendant organization of the World War II 509th Composite Group. The 509th had a single mission: to drop the atomic bomb. The group made history on 6 August 1945, when the Boeing B-29 Superfortress "Enola Gay," piloted by Col. Paul W. Tibbets Jr., dropped the first atomic bomb on Hiroshima, Japan. The B-29 "Bockscar," piloted by Maj. Charles Sweeney, flew over the Japanese mainland on 9 August 1945 and dropped the second atomic bomb on Nagasaki.

=== Cold War ===
The wing was established as 509th Bombardment Wing, Very Heavy on 3 November 1947 and organized on 17 November 1947. The initial mission of the 509th Bomb Wing was to carry out strategic bombing missions using atomic bombs at the discretion of the President of the United States.

The wing's mission expanded in July 1948 when it received the 509th Air Refueling Squadron and its KB-29M hose-type tankers and later with B/KB–29P boom–type tankers. Although aerial refueling had been accomplished as far back as the 1920s, the Air Force decided to make it a permanent part of its operations. In fact, the 509th AREFS was one of the first two AREFSs ever activated. In the first week of December 1948, the squadron began receiving the KB-29M, modified B-29 bombers capable of providing air-to-air refueling for bombers using a refueling hose [vs. today's USAF standard flying boom]. With the addition of tankers, the 509th's bombers could reach nearly any point on earth. In June 1950, the wing received the B-50D Superfortress and in January 1954, the KC-97 Stratofreighter replaced the aging KB-29Ms.

The 509th BW entered the jet age in June 1955 when it received the B-47E Stratojet, the first all-jet bomber. Deployed as a wing several times in the early 1950s, three times to England on Operation Reflex deployments and once to Guam, the wing also deployed individual squadrons at other times. Temporarily had no refueling unit during 1958. The 509th BW moved its personnel and equipment to Pease Air Force Base, New Hampshire in August 1958. By 1961, it was believed that the B-47 was becoming obsolete, and President John F. Kennedy directed that the phaseout of the B-47 be accelerated. However this was delayed in July by the onset of the Berlin Crisis of 1961. At Pease, the wing continued to function as an integral part of Strategic Air Command (SAC). By 1965, its B-47s were scheduled for retirement. Unfortunately, this retirement also included the 509th. Fate intervened, however, as SAC decided to keep the 509th alive and re-equip it.

The 509th was initially phased down for inactivation in late 1965 as a part of the retirement of the B-47, but instead was converted to use B-52D Stratofortresses and KC-135 Stratotankers in March 1966. The 509th was taken off nuclear alert as its B-52Ds were designed to carry a large number of conventional bombs (84 500-lb Mk 82 or 42 750 lb M-117s) for service in the Vietnam War as part of Operation Arc Light. The wing deployed KC-135 aircraft and crews, November 1966– December 1975; with B–52 aircraft and crews, November 1966– September 1969, and with B–52 crews, 1970. From 1 April to 1 October 1968 and 26 March to c. 21 March 1968, more than one-half of the wing was deployed to Andersen AFB, Guam to support SAC operations in Southeast Asia.

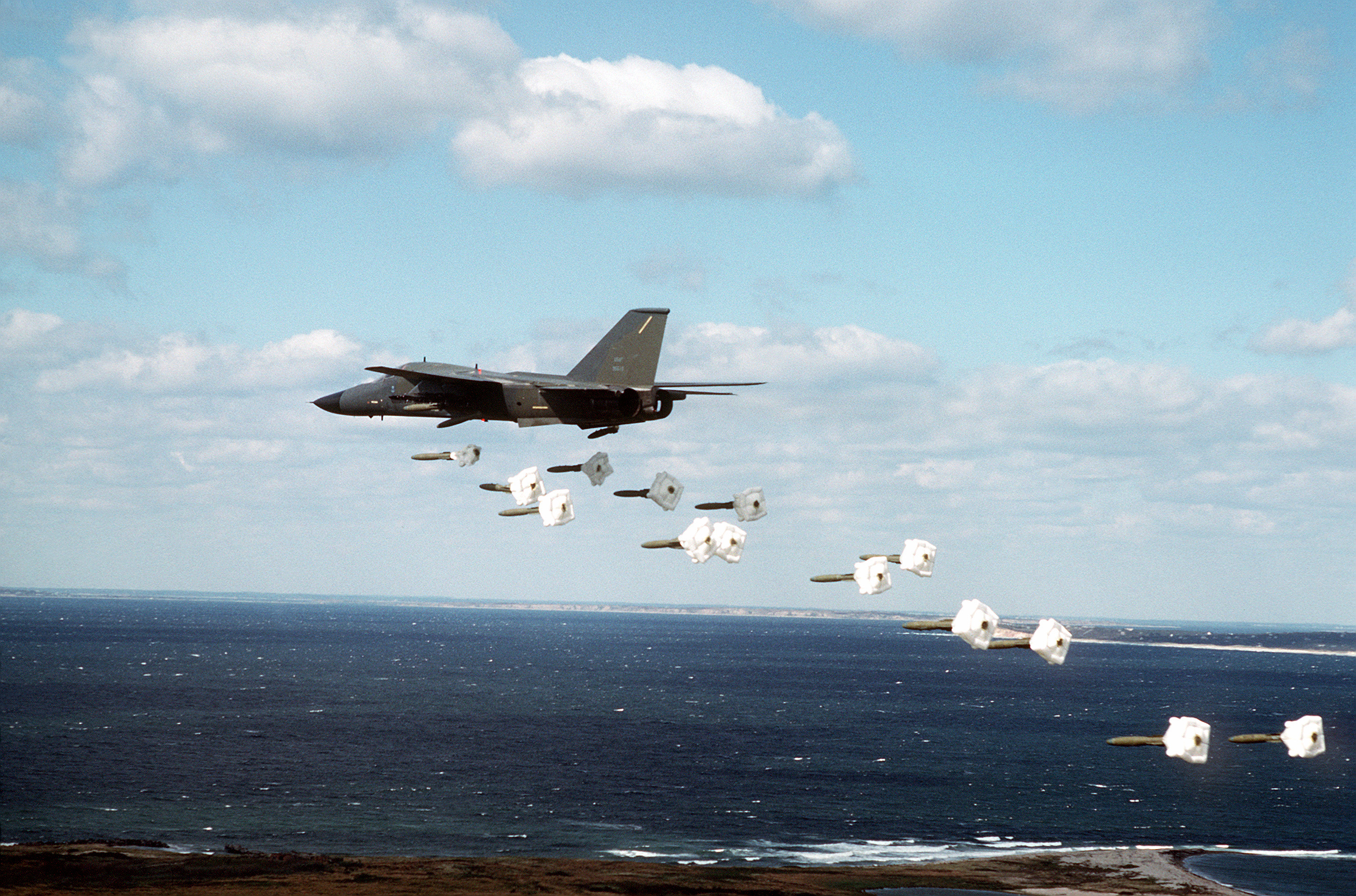
FB-111A dropping Mark 82 practice bombs during a training mission over Nomans Land

On 1 December 1969 was wing redesignated as the 509th Bombardment Wing, Medium and began receiving the FB-111A strategic bomber in December 1970. The FB-111A was the all-weather strategic bombing version of the Tactical Air Command F-111 which was equipped to carry the AGM-69 SRAM that carried a nuclear warhead with an explosive yield of 200 kilotons. The 509th would operate the aircraft for two decades. Won the SAC Bombing and Navigation competition and the Fairchild trophy in 1979, 1981, 1982, and 1983. Awarded the Sanders trophy for best air refueling unit in 1982.

Over the next two decades, little changed for the 509th BW as it became SAC's fighter-bomber experts. However, a 1988 decision by the Department of Defense to close Pease created major changes for the famous 509th. Headquarters SAC decreed that the 509th would not inactivate but would transfer to Whiteman Air Force Base to become the first B-2 stealth bomber unit. As such, the wing moved to Whiteman on 30 September 1990, without people or equipment.

As the Rockwell B-1B Lancer came into service, the FB-111 became redundant to SAC needs. In 1988, Pease was identified as one of several Air Force installations to be closed by 1991 as part of a Base Realignment and Closure Commission (BRAC) recommendation. The 509th's FB-111s were transferred from SAC to TAC between June and December 1990, being re-designated as the F-111G and converted into a tactical bomber.

=== Sole Stealth bomber unit ===
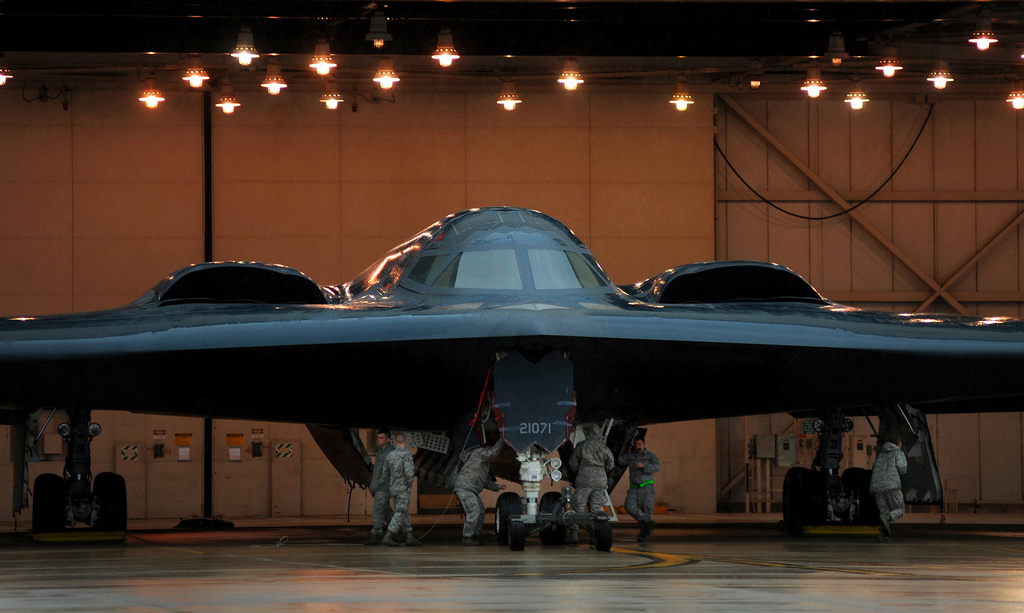
509th BW B-2A being prepared for Operation Odyssey Dawn (Note: Aircraft is Northrop B-2A Block 10 Spirit 82-1071 Spirit of Mississippi, taken 19 March 2011.)ref>

In 1988, Congressman Ike Skelton (D-MO) announced the B-2 Advanced Technology Bomber would be based at Whiteman AFB, Missouri. It was also announced that the 509th Bombardment Wing would become the USAF's first B-2 Spirit active-duty wing. Military personnel began leaving Pease in June 1990, and on 30 September 1990, the 509th was inactivated at Pease and activated at Whiteman Air Force Base as a non-operational unit the same day without aircraft, personnel or equipment. With the reassignment the unit was redesignated as the 509th Bombardment Wing, Heavy. On 1 June 1992, the Air Force disestablished the Strategic Air Command (SAC), transferring all bomber aircraft to the newly established Air Combat Command (ACC). The 509th was redesignated the 509th Bomb Wing on 1 September 1991, and became part of the new Air Combat Command on 1 June 1992.

In 1993, after two years of non-operational status, the 509th became operational again. On 1 March 1993, the wing activated the 509th Operations Group as part of the 509th Bomb Wing's reorganization under the USAF Objective Wing plan. All flying squadrons, as well as an Operational Support Squadron (OSS) were assigned to the 509th OG. The wing grew larger on 1 July 1993, when it accepted host responsibilities for Whiteman from the 351st Missile Wing. Its 509th OG received the first operational B-2 Spirit stealth bomber on 17 December 1993 (the date was the 49th anniversary of the activation of the 509th Composite Group and the 90th of the Wright brothers' flight).

Since its arrival at Whiteman, the 509th underwent inspections, tests, and other challenges to insure it was ready to return as an integral part of the nation's defensive coalition. With the B-2, the wing can bring massive firepower to bear, in a short time, anywhere on the globe through previously impenetrable defenses. The wing has deployed elements into combat over the skies of Serbia as part of Operation Allied Force in 1999; Afghanistan in 2001 as part of Operation Enduring Freedom, in 2003 over Iraq during Operation Iraqi Freedom, and in 2011 over Libya during Operation Odyssey Dawn.

The wing began to continuously deploy to Andersen AFB, Guam, in February 2005. This deployment provides a continuous bomber presence in the Asia-Pacific region and augmented Pacific Command's establishment of a deterrent force.

On 1 February 2010, the 509th Bomb Wing became part of the Air Force's newest command, Air Force Global Strike Command (AFGSC).

On June 5, 2015, Paul W. Tibbets IV, grandson of the World War II nuclear pilot, assumed command of the 509th Bomb Wing.

=== 131st Bomb Wing ===
On 16 March 2006, the Air Force announced that elements of the 131st Fighter Wing, Missouri Air National Guard (MOANG), would become an associate unit assigned to the 509th BW. The 131st Fighter Wing transitioned from flying and maintaining the F-15C Eagle fighter to the B-2 Spirit bomber. The final flight of the F-15C Eagle by the 131st occurred in June 2009 from St. Louis's Lambert International Airport. The unit was redesignated as the 131st Bomb Wing on 1 October 2008.

The 509th and the 131st joined forces according to what is known as a "classic associate wing" structure. The active-duty wing, the 509th retains full "ownership" of the operational assets; aircraft, maintenance facilities, etc. Each wing has its own chain-of-command and organizational structure, but the members of each unit perform their duties in a fully integrated manner. Translation, active-duty and ANG pilots and maintainers fly B-2 missions and sustain the aircraft as though it were one unit.

== Lineage ==
- Established as the 509th Bombardment Wing, Very Heavy on 3 November 1947

Organized on 17 November 1947
Redesignated 509th Bombardment Wing, Medium on 1 August 1948
Redesignated 509th Bombardment Wing, Heavy on 2 April 1966
Redesignated 509th Bombardment Wing, Medium on 1 December 1969
Redesignated 509th Bombardment Wing, Heavy on 30 September 1990
Redesignated 509th Bomb Wing on 1 September 1991

=== Assignments ===
- Eighth Air Force, 17 November 1947

Attached to 3d Air Division after 1 February 1951

- 47th Air Division, 10 February 1951

Remained attached to 3d Air Division Until 4 May 1951
Attached to 7th Air Division, 4 June – 2 September 1952
Attached to 3d Air Division, 10 July – 8 October 1954
Attached to 7th Air Division, 26 January – 30 April 1956

- 817th Air Division, 1 July 1958
- 45th Air Division, 30 June 1971
- Eighth Air Force, 29 March 1989
- 100th Air Division, 30 September 1990
- Eighth Air Force, 26 July 1991 – present

=== Components ===
Wing

- 33d Fighter Wing: attached 17 November 1947 – 15 November 1948

Groups

- 33d Fighter Group: attached 17 November 1947 – 15 November 1948
- 509th Bombardment Group (later 509th Operations Group): 17 November 1947 – 16 June 1952; 15 July 1993 – present

Squadrons

- 34th Air Refueling Squadron: 25 June 1966 – 31 March 1976
- 393d Bombardment Squadron: attached 17 November 1947 – 14 September 1948, attached 1 February 1951 – 15 June 1952; assigned 16 June 1952 – 30 September 1990 (detached 18 June – c. 18 September 1953)
- 509th Air Refueling Squadron: attached 19 July – 14 September 1948, 1 February 1951 – 15 June 1952; assigned 16 June 1952 – 5 January 1958 (detached 10 July – 5 November 1954, 14 June- 5 August 1955, and 27 February – 1 May 1957), 8 July 1958 – 25 June 1965, assigned 2 October 1966 – 1 July 1990
- 661st Bombardment Squadron: 1 March 1959 – 1 January 1962
- 715th Bombardment Squadron: attached 17 November 1947 – 14 September 1948, 1 February 1951 – 15 June 1952; assigned 16 June 1952 – 25 June 1966, 1 January 1970 – 30 September 1990
- 830th Bombardment Squadron: attached 17 November 1947 – 14 September 1948, 1 February 1951 – 15 June 1952; 16 June 1952 – 25 June 1966 (detached 15 March – 19 June 1953)
- 900th Air Refueling Squadron: 2 April – 25 June 1966.

=== Stations ===
- Roswell Army Air Field (later Roswell Air Force Base, Walker Air Force Base), New Mexico, 17 November 1947
- Pease Air Force Base, New Hampshire, 1 July 1958
- Whiteman Air Force Base, Missouri, 30 September 1990 – present

=== Aircraft ===
- F-51 Mustang, 1947–1948
- F-84 Thunderjet, 1948
- B-29 Superfortress, 1947–1952
- B-50 Superfortress, 1949–1951
- KB-29 Superfortress (Tanker), 1951–1954
- KC-97 Stratofreighter, 1954–1958, 1958–1965
- B-47 Stratojet, 1955–1965
- B-52D Stratofortress, 1966–1969
- KC-135 Stratotanker, 1966–1990
- FB-111A, 1970–1990
- B-2 Spirit, 1993–present
- T-38 Talon, 1993–present

== See also ==
- List of B-50 units of the United States Air Force
- List of B-47 units of the United States Air Force
- List of B-52 Units of the United States Air Force
