= Luke the Spook =

- Diagram of a Boeing B-29 Superfortress

General information
- Manufacturer: Glenn L. Martin Company
- Owners: USAAF, later USAF
- Serial: 44-86346
- Radio code: Victor 94

History
- Manufactured: 1945
- In service: June 15, 1945 to July 1960
- Fate: converted to TB-29 and scrapped in July 1960

Luke the Spook was the name of a Boeing B-29-50-MO Superfortress (serial 44-86346, Victor number 94) configured to carry the atomic bomb in World War II.

== History ==
Luke the Spook was one of the fifteen Silverplate B-29s delivered to the 509th Composite Group for use in the atomic bomb operation and assigned to the 393d Bomb Squadron. Built at the Glenn L. Martin Aircraft plant at Omaha, Nebraska, it was accepted by the USAAF on June 15, 1945, after most of the 509th CG had already left Wendover Army Air Field, Utah, for North Field, Tinian. Assigned to Crew C-12 (Capt. Herman S. Zahn, Aircraft Commander), it was flown to Wendover in early July and briefly used in training and practice bombing missions.

On July 27, 1945, Zahn and his crew flew the airplane from Wendover to Kirtland Army Air Field, Albuquerque, New Mexico, accompanied by another 509th B-29 and one from the Manhattan Project test unit at Wendover (216th Base Unit). There each loaded one of three Fat Man atomic bomb assemblies (without the plutonium core, which had left the day before by courier on one of the 509th CG's C-54 Skymaster transports) in its bomb bay for conveyance to Tinian.

The three bombers flew to Mather Army Air Field, California, on July 28, and took off for Hawaii on July 29, finally reaching Tinian on August 2. It was assigned the square P tail identifier of the 39th Bomb Group as a security measure and given Victor (unit-assigned identification) number 94 to avoid misidentification with actual 39th BG aircraft.

The airplane was not given a name or nose art. It arrived too late to participate in any training, practice, or combat operations. After only a week on Tinian, 44-86346 was reassigned to the group deputy commander, Lt.Col. Thomas J. Classen, and his crew A-5. It left Tinian on August 9, 1945, and returned to Wendover accompanied by the B-29 Jabit III, with the maintenance crews for both airplanes aboard, to await orders to transport components of the third bomb.

The airplane flew to Roswell Army Air Field, New Mexico, in November 1945, where it rejoined the 509th CG. There its crew gave it the name Luke the Spook. Between April and August 1946 it was part of the Operation Crossroads task force based on Kwajalein.

In June 1949 it was transferred to the 97th Bomb Group at Biggs Air Force Base, Texas, and in April 1950 was converted to a TB-29 trainer at Kelly Air Force Base, Texas, and the Oklahoma City Air Materiel Area at Tinker Air Force Base.

It was subsequently assigned to:

- 10th Radar Calibration Squadron, Yokota Air Base, Japan (August 1952),
- 6023rd Radar Evaluation Flight, Yokota AB (March 1954), Johnson Air Base, Japan (May 1957), and Naha AB (November 1958),
- 6431st Air Base Group, Naha Air Base, Okinawa (December 1959),
- 51st Air Base Group, Naha AB (July 1960), where it was dropped from inventory and scrapped.

== Sources ==
- Campbell, Richard H., The Silverplate Bombers: A History and Registry of the Enola Gay and Other B-29s Configured to Carry Atomic Bombs (2005), ISBN 0-7864-2139-8
