= Laggin' Dragon =

General information
- Type: Boeing B-29-50-MO Superfortress
- Manufacturer: Glenn L. Martin Company
- Serial: 44-86347
- Radio code: Victor 95

History
- In service: June 15, 1945 - July 1960
- Fate: Converted to TB-29 in 1946, scrapped July 1960

Laggin' Dragon was the name of a Boeing B-29 Superfortress (B-29-50-MO, 44-86347 Victor number 95) configured to carry the atomic bomb in World War II.

== Airplane history ==
Laggin' Dragon was the last of the fifteen Silverplate B-29s delivered to the 509th Composite Group for use in the atomic bomb operation. Built at the Glenn L. Martin Aircraft plant at Omaha, Nebraska, it was accepted by the USAAF on June 15, 1945, after most of the 509th CG had already left Wendover Army Air Field, Utah, for North Field, Tinian. Assigned to the 393d Bomb Squadron, Crew A-2 (Capt. Edward M. Costello, Aircraft Commander) flew it to Wendover in early July and briefly used in training and practice bombing missions.

On July 27, 1945, Costello and his crew flew the airplane from Wendover to Kirtland Army Air Field, Albuquerque, New Mexico, accompanied by another 509th B-29 and one from the Manhattan Project test unit at Wendover (216th AAF Base Unit). There each loaded one of three Fat Man atomic bomb assemblies (without the plutonium core, which had left the day before by courier on one of the 509th CG's C-54 Skymaster transports) in its bomb bay for conveyance to Tinian.

The three bombers flew to Mather Army Air Field, California, on July 28, and took off for Hawaii on July 29. During takeoff from Mather, a panel door on Laggin' Dragon enclosing the life raft compartment opened and ejected the raft, which wrapped around the empennage and impeded the B-29's elevators. The aircraft struggled to stay aloft but the pilots managed to return safely to Mather. After removing and replacing some major tail assemblies, Laggin' Dragon and its cargo continued to Hawaii, finally reaching Tinian on August 2.

It was assigned the square P tail identifier of the 39th Bomb Group as a security measure and given Victor (unit-assigned identification) number 95 to avoid misidentification with actual 39th BG aircraft. The airplane was named while still at Wendover but the nose art was not applied until after the atomic missions. It arrived too late to participate in other combat operations and participated in two practice flights subsequent to the atomic attacks. On August 9, 1945, as part of the second atomic bomb mission, it was flown by another crew as the weather reconnaissance aircraft for the secondary target of Nagasaki.

Laggin' Dragon returned to the United States in November 1945, based with the 509th CG at Roswell Army Air Field, New Mexico. In June 1946 it was part of the Operation Crossroads task force based on Kwajalein. In June 1949 it was transferred to the 97th Bomb Group at Biggs Air Force Base, Texas, and in April 1950 was converted to a TB-29 trainer at Kelly Air Force Base, Texas, and the Oklahoma City Air Materiel Area at Tinker Air Force Base.

It was subsequently assigned to:

- 10th Radar Calibration Squadron, Yokota Air Base, Japan (September 1952),
- 6023rd Radar Evaluation Flight, Yokota AB (March 1954), Johnson Air Base, Japan (July 1956),
- 6431st Air Base Group, Naha Air Base, Okinawa (July 1958),
- 51st Air Base Group, Naha AB (July 1960), where it was dropped from inventory and scrapped.

=== Nagasaki mission crew ===
Crew A-2

- Edward M. Costello, Air Commander
- Harry B. Davis, Co-Pilot
- Thomas H. Brumagin, Flight Engineer
- Robert J. Petrolli, Navigator
- John L. Downey, Bombardier
- James McGlennon, Ground Crew
- Carleton McEachern, Tail Gunner
- David Purdon, Radio Operator
- Maurice Clark, Asst. Flight Engineer
- James Bryant, Radar Operator

Crew B-8 (regularly assigned to Top Secret)

- 1st Lt. Charles F. McKnight, airplane commander
- 2nd Lt. Jacob Y. Bontekoe, co-pilot
- 2nd Lt. Jack Widowsky, navigator
- 2nd Lt. Franklin H. MacGregor, bombardier
- 1st Lt. George H. Cohen, flight engineer
- Sgt. Lloyd J. Reeder, radio operator
- T/Sgt. William F. Orren, radar operator
- Sgt. Roderick E. Legg, tail gunner
- Carleton C. McEachern, Tail Gunner
- Cpl. Donald O. Cole, Assistant engineer, scanner

== Other aircraft named Laggin' Dragon ==
Three FB-111A strategic bombers of the USAF 509th Bomb Wing, serials 68–0269, 68-0274 and 68–0284, carried the name and original nose art of Laggin' Dragon on their nosewheel doors while based at Pease Air Force Base, New Hampshire, in the 1970s and 1980s.

== Sources ==
- Campbell, Richard H., The Silverplate Bombers: A History and Registry of the Enola Gay and Other B-29s Configured to Carry Atomic Bombs (2005), ISBN 0-7864-2139-8
- 509th CG Aircraft Page, MPHPA
- MPHPA . Manhattan Project Heritage Preservation Association, Inc., 3 August 2005. Web.
- Atomic Heritage Foundation Hiroshima and Nagasaki Missions -- Planes & Crews
