= Straight Flush =

B-29 aircraft that supported the bombing of Hiroshima

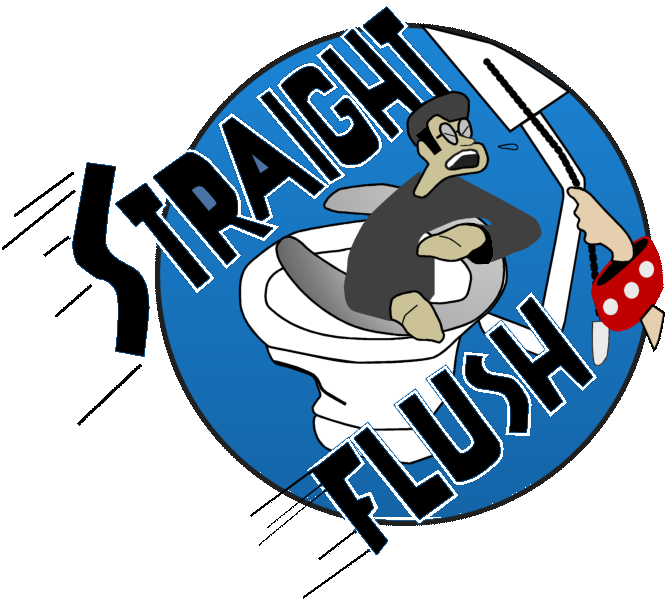
Straight Flush nose art

Straight Flush was the name of a B-29 Superfortress (B-29-36-MO 44-27301, Victor number 85) that participated in the atomic bomb attack on Hiroshima on August 6, 1945.

Assigned to the 393d Bomb Squadron, 509th Composite Group, it was used as a weather reconnaissance plane and flew over the city before the attack to determine if conditions were favorable for a visual drop. Pilot Claude Eatherly later expressed remorse, received psychiatric hospitalization, and engaged in anti-nuclear activism, which may be the origin of urban legends that Eatherly, Enola Gay pilot Paul Tibbets, or other members of the two planes' crews went insane after the bombings.

== Airplane history ==
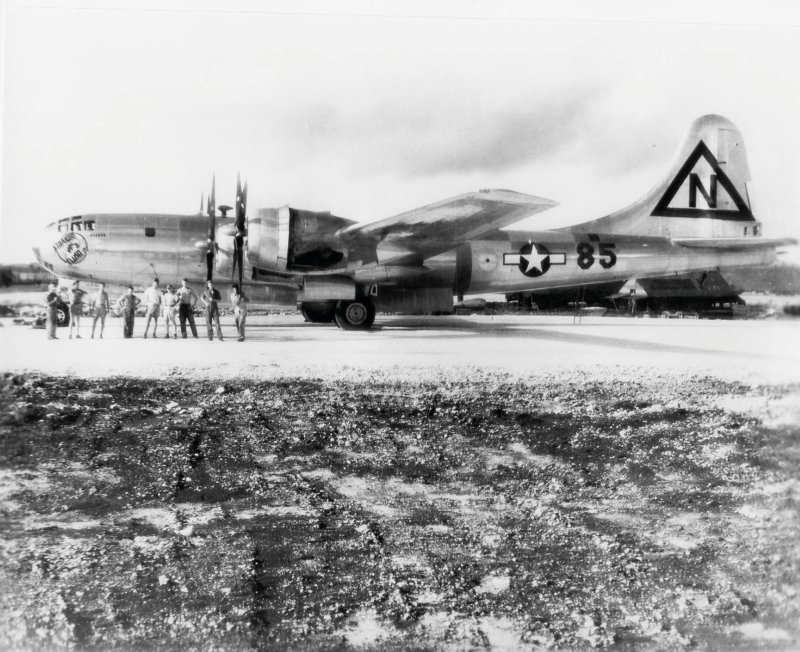
Straight Flush.

Straight Flush was one of the fifteen Silverplate B-29's used by the 509th in its deployment to North Field, Tinian. It was one of ten B-29s built at the Glenn L. Martin Company plant in Omaha, Nebraska, as a "block 35" B-29 but then designated "block 36" to denote its special configuration. It was flown from Omaha to the 509th's base at Wendover Army Air Field, Utah, on April 2, 1945, and assigned to Capt. Claude Eatherly and crew C-11, and departed Wendover June 8, 1945, arriving at Tinian on June 13.

It was originally assigned the Victor (unit-assigned identification) number 5 but on August 1 was given the triangle N tail markings of the 444th Bomb Group as a security measure and had its Victor changed to 85 to avoid misidentification with actual 444th BG aircraft. It was named Straight Flush, purportedly based on a gambling penchant of Eatherly.

From June to August it flew 11 training missions, and six combat missions in which "pumpkin bombs" (five-ton conventional bombs with the same handling characteristics as the nuclear weapons) were dropped on Japanese industrial targets. Eatherly's crew bombed Tokyo (20 July), Otsu (24 July), Kanose (26 July, 1945), and Maizuru (29 July) in Straight Flush, while 1st Lt. Charles D. Albury and crew C-15 used it to bomb Koromo (挙母市 Koromo-shi). On August 6, Straight Flush flew a mission over Japan as a weather patrol aircraft for the Hiroshima bombing; two days later, it made its final combat flight, a bombing raid on Yokkaichi.

One source (Campbell) states that on the first Pumpkin mission, on July 20, Eatherly attempted to bomb the Imperial Palace through overcast as a "target of opportunity" but missed, hitting a bridge called Gofukubashi. The attack was contrary to bombing restrictions (to protect the person of Emperor Hirohito) but apparently was not punished.

In November 1945 Straight Flush returned with the 509th to Roswell Army Air Field, New Mexico. From March to August 1946 it was assigned to the Operation Crossroads task force, then rejoined the 509th BG at Roswell.

In June 1949 Straight Flush was transferred to the 97th Bombardment Group at Biggs Air Force Base, Texas, then sent to Tinker Air Force Base in April 1950 for modification to TB-29 trainer specifications at the Oklahoma City Air Materiel Area.

Subsequent assignments were to:

- 2nd Radar Calibration Squadron, Elmendorf Air Force Base, Alaska (April 1953), and the
- 5025th Maintenance Group, Elmendorf AFB (August 1953).

In December 1953 it was sent to the 3040th Aircraft Storage Group at Davis-Monthan Air Force Base, Arizona, where it was scrapped in July 1954.

In 2015 another preserved B-29 known as "Hagarty's Hag" at the Hill Aerospace Museum was repainted to resemble Straight Flush.

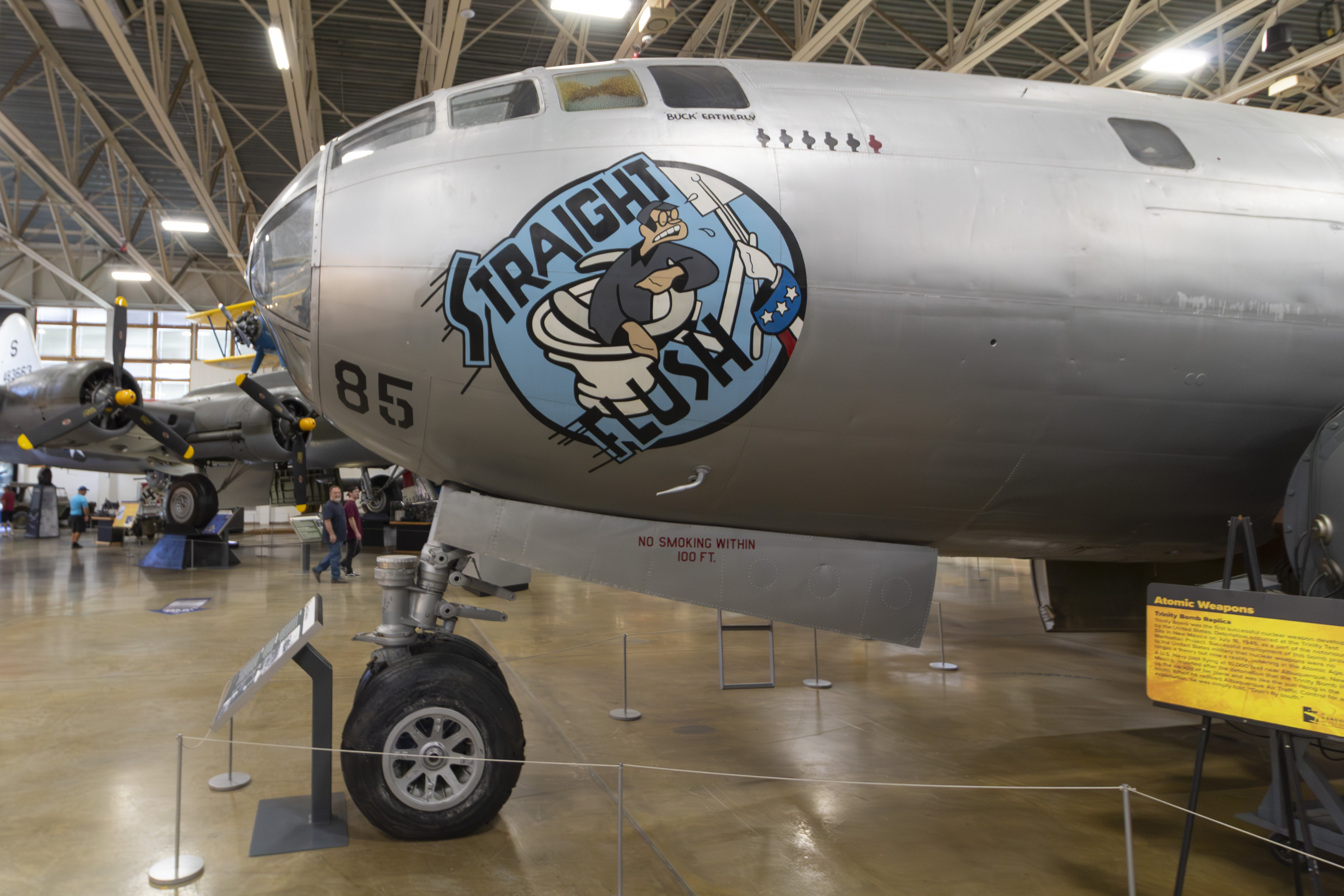
B-29 serial #44-86408 "Hagarty's Hag" on display as the 509th composite group's "Straight Flush."

=== Hiroshima mission crew ===
Crew C-11 (regularly assigned to Straight Flush)

- Capt. Claude R.Eatherly, Aircraft Commander
- 2nd Lt. Ira Cecil Weatherly Jr, Pilot
- Captain Francis D. Thornhill, Navigator
- 2nd Lt. Frank K. Wey, Jr, Bombardier
- 2nd Lt. Eugene S. Grennan, Flight Engineer
- S/Sgt. Pasquale Baldasaro, Radio Operator
- Sgt. Albert G. Barsumian, Radar Operator
- Sgt. Gillon T. Niceley, Tail Gunner
- Sgt. Jack Bivans, Assistant Engineer/Scanner
- Sgt. Robert Wasz, Navigator "trip done"

== Other aircraft named Straight Flush ==
Three FB-111A strategic bombers of the USAF 509th Bomb Wing, serials 68-0256, 69-6503, and 69-6512, carried the name and original nose art of Straight Flush on their nose wheel doors while based at Pease Air Force Base, New Hampshire, in the 1970s and 1980s.
