= 509th Composite Group =

US Air Force unit tasked with the atomic bombing of Hiroshima and Nagasaki

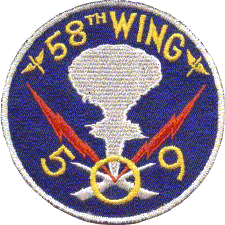
- 1946 emblem of the 509th Composite Group while part of the 58th Bombardment Wing, Very Heavy
- Active: 17 December 1944 – 10 July 1946
- Country: United States
- Branch: United States Army ( Army Air Forces
- Type: Bombardment and air transport composite
- Role: Atomic warfare
- Size: 1767 personnel, 15 B-29 and 5 C-54 aircraft
- Part of: 313th Bombardment Wing; Twentieth Air Force
- Garrison/HQ: North Field (Tinian), Mariana Islands
- Engagements: : World War II; Asiatic-Pacific Campaign (1945)

Commanders
- Notable commanders: Paul Tibbets

The 509th Composite Group (509 CG) was a unit of the United States Army Air Forces created during World War II and tasked with the operational deployment of nuclear weapons. It conducted the atomic bombings of Hiroshima and Nagasaki, Japan, in August 1945.

The group was activated on 17 December 1944 at Wendover Army Air Field, Utah. It was commanded by Lieutenant Colonel Paul W. Tibbets. Because it contained flying squadrons equipped with Boeing B-29 Superfortress bombers, C-47 Skytrain, and C-54 Skymaster transport aircraft, the group was designated as a "composite", rather than a "bombardment" formation. It operated Silverplate B-29s, which were specially configured to enable them to carry nuclear weapons.

The 509th Composite Group began deploying to North Field on Tinian, Northern Mariana Islands, in May 1945. In addition to the two nuclear bombing raids, it carried out 15 practice missions against Japanese-held islands, and 12 combat missions against targets in Japan dropping high-explosive pumpkin bombs.

In the postwar era, the 509th Composite Group was one of the original ten bombardment groups assigned to Strategic Air Command on 21 March 1946 and the only one equipped with Silverplate B-29 Superfortress aircraft capable of delivering atomic bombs. It was standardized as a bombardment group and redesignated the 509th Bombardment Group, Very Heavy, on 10 July 1946.

== History ==
=== Organization, training, and security ===
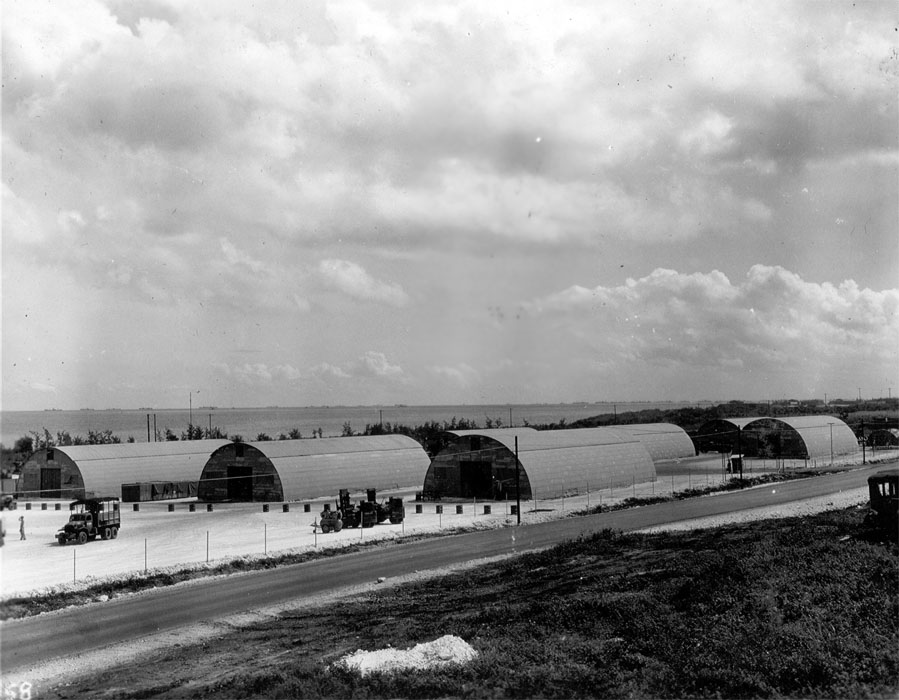
First Ordnance Squadron area on Tinian

The 509th Composite Group was constituted on 9 December 1944, and activated on 17 December 1944, at Wendover Army Air Field, Utah. It was commanded by Lieutenant Colonel Paul W. Tibbets, who received promotion to full colonel in January 1945. It was initially assumed that the group would divide in two, with half going to Europe and half to the Pacific. In the first week of September Tibbets was assigned to organize a combat group to develop the means of delivering an atomic weapon by airplane against targets in Germany and Japan, then command it in combat. Because the organization developed by Tibbets was self-sustained, with flying squadrons of both Boeing B-29 Superfortress bombers and transport aircraft, the group was designated as a "composite" rather than a "bombardment" unit.

On 8 September, working with Major General Leslie R. Groves, Jr.'s Manhattan Project, Tibbets selected Wendover for his training base over Great Bend Army Air Field, Kansas, and Mountain Home Army Airfield, Idaho, because of its remoteness. On 14 September 1944, the 393d Bombardment Squadron arrived at Wendover from its former base at Fairmont Army Air Base, Nebraska, where it had been in operational training (OTU) with the 504th Bombardment Group since 12 March. When its parent group deployed to the Marianas in early November 1944, the squadron was assigned directly to the Second Air Force until creation of the 509th Composite Group. Originally consisting of twenty-one crews, fifteen were selected to continue training, and were organized into three flights of five crews, lettered A, B, and C. The 393d Bombardment Squadron was commanded by Lieutenant Colonel Thomas J. Classen, who like Tibbets had combat experience in heavy bombers, commanding a Boeing B-17 Flying Fortress with the 11th Bombardment Group.

The 393d Bombardment Squadron conducted ground school training only until delivery of three modified Silverplate airplanes in mid-October 1944 allowed resumption of flight training. These aircraft had extensive bomb bay modifications and a "weaponeer" station installed. Initial training operations identified numerous other modifications necessary to the mission, particularly in reducing the overall weight of the airplane to offset the heavy loads it would be required to carry. Five more Silverplates were delivered in November and six in December, giving the group 14 for its training operations. In January and February 1945, 10 of the 15 crews under the command of the Group S-3 (operations officer) were assigned temporary duty at Batista Field, San Antonio de los Baños, Cuba, where they trained in long-range over-water navigation.

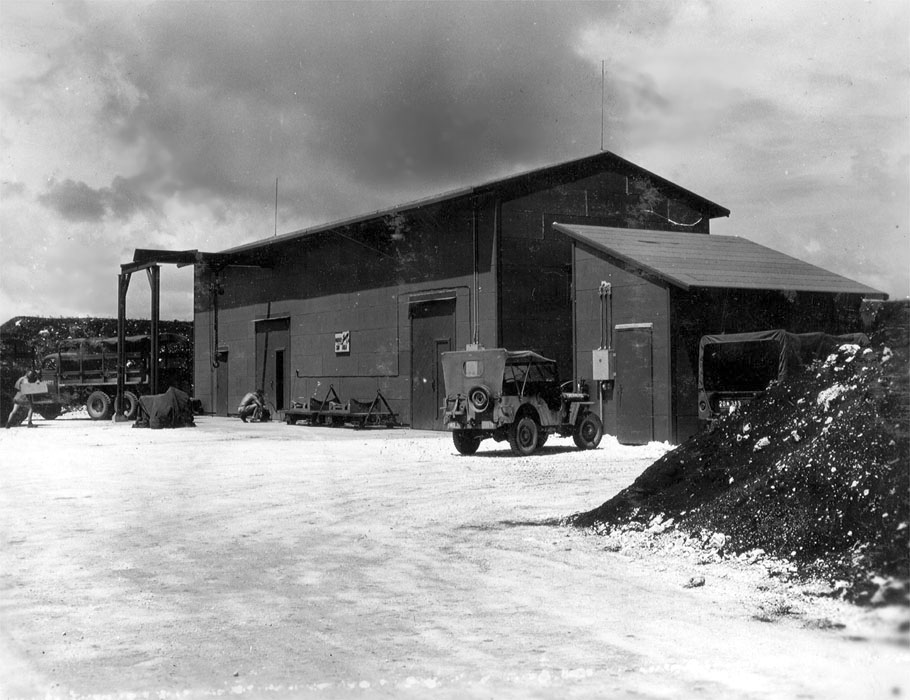
Assembly Building where bombs were assembled

The 320th Troop Carrier Squadron, the other flying unit of the 509th, came into being because of the highly secret work of the group. The organization that was to become the 509th required its own transports for the movement of both personnel and materiel, resulting in creation of an ad hoc unit nicknamed "The Green Hornet Line". Crews for this unit were acquired from the five 393d crews not selected to continue B-29 training. All those qualified for positions with the 320th chose to remain with the 509th rather than be assigned to a replacement pool of the Second Air Force. They began using C-46 Commando and C-47 Skytrains already at Wendover, and in November 1944 acquired three C-54 Skymasters. The 320th Troop Carrier Squadron originally consisted of three C-54 and four C-47 aircraft. In April 1945 the C-47s were transferred to the 216th Army Air Forces Base Unit and two additional C-54s acquired. The 320th Troop Carrier Squadron was constituted and activated on the same dates as the group.

Other support units were activated at Wendover from personnel already present and working with Project Alberta or in the 216th Army Air Forces Base Unit, both affiliated with the Manhattan project. Project Alberta was the part of the Manhattan Project at Site Y in Los Alamos, New Mexico, responsible for the preparation and delivery of the nuclear weapons. It was commanded by U.S. Navy Captain William S. Parsons, who would accompany the Hiroshima mission as weaponeer. On 6 March 1945, concurrent with the activation of Project Alberta, the 1st Ordnance Squadron, Special (Aviation) was activated at Wendover, again using Army Air Forces personnel on hand or already at Los Alamos. Its purpose was to provide "skilled machinists, welders and munitions workers" and special equipment to the group to enable it to assemble atomic weapons at its operating base, thereby allowing the weapons to be transported more safely in their component parts. A rigorous candidate selection process was used to recruit personnel, reportedly with an 80% "washout" rate. Not until May 1945 did the 509th Composite Group reach full strength.

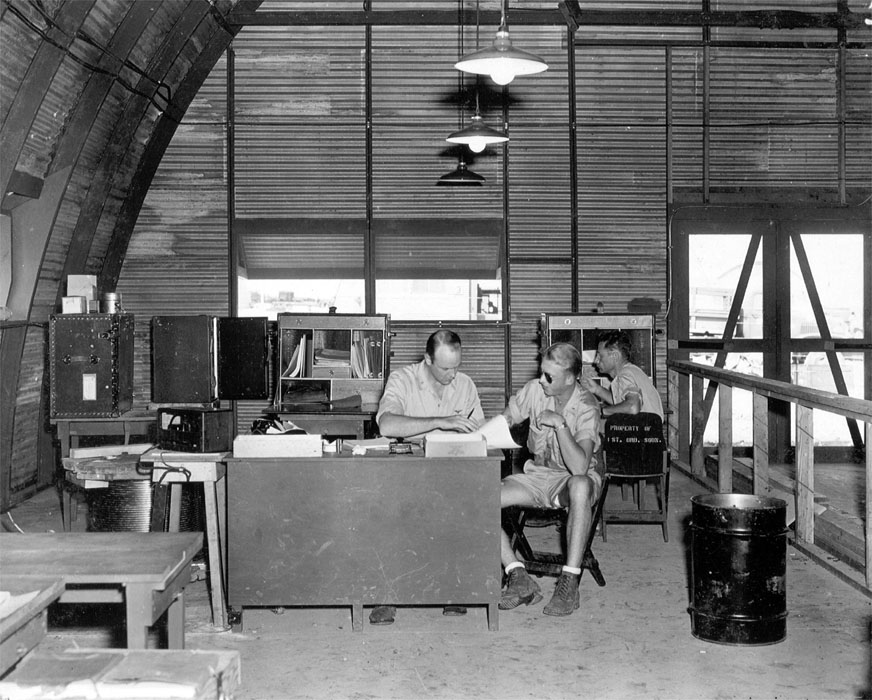
Commander Ashworth in the First Ordnance Squadron Area

The 390th Air Service Group was created as the command echelon for the 603rd Air Engineering Squadron, the 1027th Air Material Squadron, and its own Headquarters and Base Services Squadron, but when these units became independent operationally, it acted as the basic support unit for the entire 509th Composite Group in providing quarters, rations, medical care, postal service and other functions. The 603rd Air Engineering Squadron was unique in that it provided depot-level B-29 maintenance in the field, obviating the necessity of sending aircraft back to the United States for major repairs. On Tinian the 603rd Air Engineering Squadron was assigned to the 313th Bombardment Wing's "C" and "D" Service Centers, where it performed provided depot-level ("third echelon") maintenance for the entire 313th Bombardment Wing when it was not engaged in 509th activities. The 393d Bombardment Squadron's maintenance section was re-organized as a "combat line maintenance" section (also called PLM, or "production line maintenance," a technique developed by the Air Transport Command in India for "Hump" aircraft) to maximize use of personnel for first and second echelon maintenance.

=== Overseas movement ===
With the addition of the 1st Ordnance Squadron to its roster, the 509th Composite Group had an authorized strength of 225 officers and 1,542 enlisted men, almost all of whom deployed to Tinian. The 320th Troop Carrier Squadron kept its base of operations at Wendover. In addition to its authorized strength, the 509th had attached to it on Tinian 51 civilian and military personnel of Project Alberta, and two representatives from Washington, D.C., the deputy director of the Manhattan Project, Brigadier General Thomas Farrell, and Rear Admiral William R. Purnell of the Military Policy Committee.

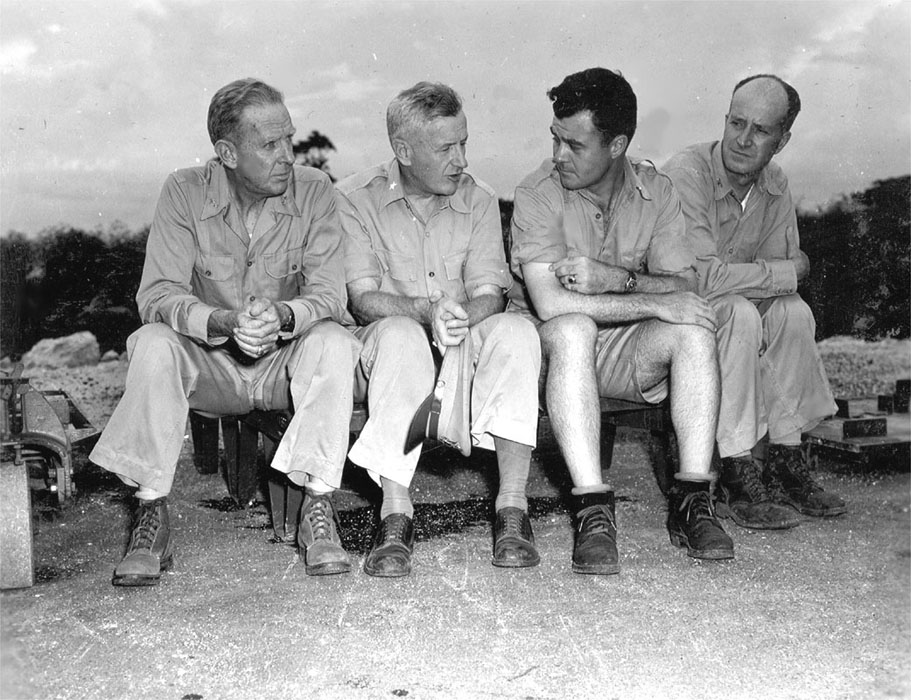
Rear Admiral William R. Purnell, Brigadier General Thomas F. Farrell, Colonel Paul W. Tibbets, and Captain William S. Parsons

The 509th's personnel and equipment were subject to a high level of security. En route to Tinian on 4 June 1945, the B-29 that became The Great Artiste made an intermediate stop at Mather Field, near Sacramento, California. The commanding general of the base allegedly attempted to enter the aircraft to inspect it and was warned by a plane guard who aimed his carbine at the general's chest that he could not do so. A similar incident occurred to a Project Alberta courier, 2nd Lieutenant William A. King. King was escorting the plutonium core of the Fat Man implosion bomb to Tinian, strapped to the floor of one of the 509th's C-54s. On 26 July 1945 it made a refueling stop at Hickam Field, Hawaii. The commander of a combat unit returning to the United States learned that the Skymaster had only one passenger and attempted to enter the C-54 to requisition it as transport for his men. He was prevented from doing so by King, who aimed a .45 caliber automatic pistol at the colonel.

The 509th transferred four of its 14 training Silverplate B-29s to the 216th AAF Base Unit in February 1945. In April the third modification increment of Silverplates, which would be their combat aircraft, began coming off the Martin-Omaha assembly line. These "fly-away" aircraft were equipped with fuel-injected engines, Curtiss Electric reversible-pitch propellers, pneumatic actuators for rapid opening and closing of bomb bay doors and other improvements. The remaining 17 Silverplate B-29s were placed in storage. Each bombardier completed at least 50 practice drops of inert pumpkin bombs before Tibbets declared his group combat-ready.

The ground support echelon of the 509th Composite Group, consisting of 44 officers and 815 enlisted men commanded by Major George W. Westcott of the Headquarters Squadron, received movement orders and moved by rail on 26 April 1945 to its port of embarkation at Seattle, Washington. On 6 May the support elements sailed on the SS Cape Victory for the Marianas, while group materiel was shipped on the SS Emile Berliner. The Cape Victory made brief port calls at Honolulu and Eniwetok but the passengers were not permitted to leave the dock area. An advance party of the air echelon, consisting of 29 officers and 61 enlisted men commanded by Group Intelligence Officer (S-2) Lieutenant Colonel Hazen Payette, flew by C-54 to North Field, Tinian, between 15 and 22 May. It was joined by the ground echelon on 29 May 1945, marking the group's official change of station. Project Alberta's "Destination Team" also sent most of its members to Tinian to supervise the assembly, loading, and dropping of the bombs under the administrative title of 1st Technical Services Detachment, Miscellaneous War Department Group.

=== Equipment and crews ===
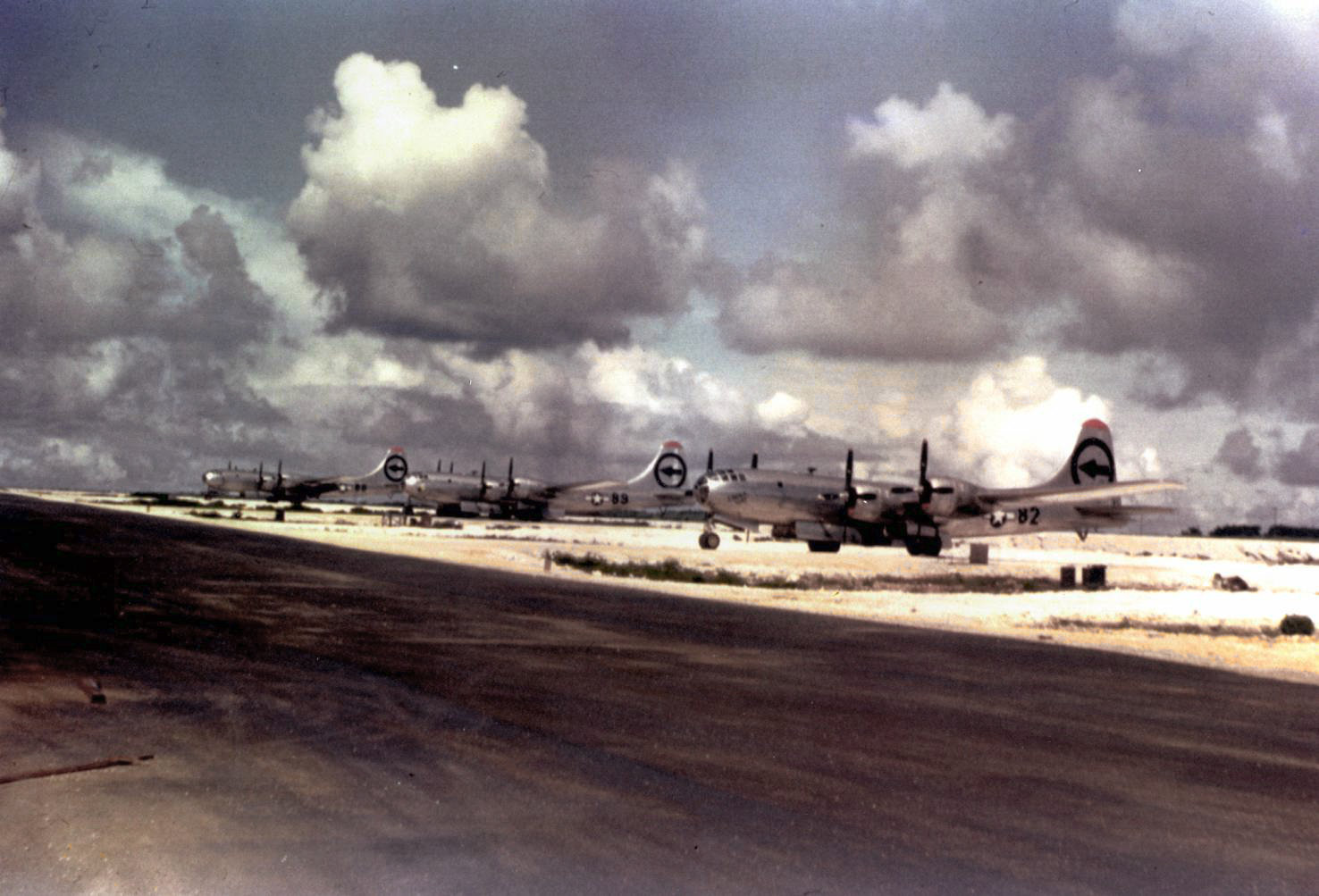
Aircraft of the 509th Composite Group on Tinian. Left to right: Big Stink, The Great Artiste, and Enola Gay

The air echelon consisted of the members of the 393d Bombardment Squadron. The 320th Troop Carrier Squadron remained at Wendover. It began deploying from Wendover 4 June 1945, with the first B-29 arriving at North Field on 11 June. The group was assigned to the 313th Bombardment Wing, whose four groups had been flying missions against Japan since mid-February, but for security reasons their permanent base area was near the runways on the island's north tip, several miles away from the main installations in the center of Tinian. The 509th, after spending most of June in an area previously occupied by the Seabees of the 18th Naval Construction Battalion, took over the 13th Naval Construction Battalion Area just west of North Field's Runway D, a self-contained base with 89 Quonset huts, a huge storage warehouse, a consolidated mess hall, chapel, administrative area, theater, and other amenities.

Each crew was required to attend the 313th Bombardment Wing's week-long "Lead Crew Ground School" on its arrival. The ground school indoctrinated combat crews in procedures regarding air-sea rescue, ditching and bailouts, survival, radar bombing, weather, wing and air force regulations, emergency procedures, camera operation, dinghy drills, and other topics related to combat operations. Two of the group's bombers were not delivered by Martin-Omaha until early July. They remained at Wendover until 27 July to act as transports for two of the Fat Man assemblies.

Because of their geographical isolation from the combat crews of other groups, rigidly enforced security measures, and exclusion from participation in regular bombing missions, crews of the 393d Bombardment Squadron were resented and ridiculed as "lacking in discipline" and having a "soft life". The official history of the Army Air Forces characterized the ridicule as "epitomized in a satirical verse entitled Nobody Knows, with a recurring refrain, 'For the 509th is winning the war.'"

The group was assigned tail markings of a circle outline (denoting the 313th Wing) around an arrowhead pointing forward, but at the beginning of August its B-29s were repainted with the tail markings of other XXI Bomber Command groups as a security measure, because it was feared that Japanese survivors on Tinian were reporting the 509th's activities to Tokyo by clandestine radio. The Victor (identification assigned by the squadron) numbers previously assigned the 393d aircraft were changed to avoid confusion with B-29s of the groups from whom the tail identifiers were borrowed. Victor numbers 82, 89, 90, and 91 (including the Enola Gay) carried the markings of the 6th Bombardment Group (Circle R); Victors 71, 72, 73, and 84 those of the 497th Bombardment Group (large "A"); Victors 77, 85, 86, and 88 those of the 444th Bombardment Group (triangle N); and Victors 83, 94, and 95 those of the 39th Bombardment Group (square P).

Combat B-29s of the 393d Bomb Squadron (VH) on Tinian
AAF serial #	Victor #	Name	Crew #	Airplane Commander	USAAF Delivery	Arr. Tinian	Tail Code
B-29-36-MO 44-27296	84	Some Punkins	B-7	Captain James N. Price	19 March 1945	14 June 1945	Large A
B-29-36-MO 44-27297	77	Bockscar	C-13	Captain Frederick C. Bock	19 March 1945	17 June 1945	Triangle N
B-29-36-MO 44-27298	83	Full House	A-1	Captain Ralph R. Taylor	20 March 1945	17 June 1945	Square P
B-29-36-MO 44-27299	86	Next Objective	A-3	1st Lieutenant Ralph N. Devore	20 March 1945	17 June 1945	Triangle N
B-29-36-MO 44-27300	73	Strange Cargo	A-4	1st Lieutenant Joseph E. Westover	2 April 1945	11 June 1945	Large A
B-29-36-MO 44-27301	85	Straight Flush	C-11	Captain Claude R. Eatherly	2 April 1945	14 June 1945	Triangle N
B-29-36-MO 44-27302	72	Top Secret	B-8	1st Lieutenant Charles F. McKnight	2 April 1945	11 June 1945	Large A
B-29-36-MO 44-27303	71	Jabit III	B-6	Captain John A. Wilson	3 April 1945	11 June 1945	Large A
B-29-36-MO 44-27304	88	Up An' Atom	B-10	Captain George W. Marquardt	3 April 1945	17 June 1945	Triangle N
B-29-40-MO 44-27353	89	The Great Artiste	C-15	1st Lieutenant Charles D. Albury	20 April 1945	28 June 1945	Circle R
B-29-40-MO 44-27354	90	Big Stink	A-5*	Lieutenant Colonel Thomas J. Classen*	20 April 1945	25 June 1945	Circle R
B-29-45-MO 44-86291	91	Necessary Evil	C-14	1st Lieutenant Norman W. Ray	18 May 1945	2 July 1945	Circle R
B-29-45-MO 44-86292	82	Enola Gay	B-9	Captain Robert A. Lewis	18 May 1945	6 July 1945	Circle R
B-29-50-MO 44-86346	94	Luke the Spook	C-12*	Captain Herman S. Zahn*	15 June 1945	2 August 1945	Square P
B-29-50-MO 44-86347	95	Laggin' Dragon	A-2	Captain Edward M. Costello	15 June 1945	2 August 1945	Square P

* These airplane commanders and crews exchanged aircraft assignments on 9 August 1945

Although all of the B-29s were named as shown, the only nose art applied to the aircraft before the atomic bomb missions was that of Enola Gay. With the exceptions of Victors 71 and 94, the others were applied some time in August 1945. Luke the Spook was not named until November 1945, and it is not known if nose art was ever applied to Jabit III.

=== Combat operations ===
After ground training for the combat crews, the 509th began operations on 30 June 1945, with a calibration flight involving nine of the B-29s on hand. During the month of July and the first eight days of August the thirteen bombers of the 393d Bombardment Squadron flew an intensive training and mission rehearsal program that consisted of:

- 17 individual training sorties without ordnance,
- 15 practice bombing missions between 1 and 22 July against airfields on Japanese-held Truk, Marcus, Rota, and Guguan in which 90 B-29 sorties dropped 500- and 1000-pound bombs to practice radar and visual bombing procedures,
- 12 combat missions between 20 and 29 July against targets in Japan dropping high-explosive pumpkin bombs, in which 37 B-29 sorties delivered conventional-bomb replications of the Fat Man: four on 20 July, three on 24 July, two on 26 July, and three on 29 July. Some 27 sorties were made visually and 10 by radar, striking 17 primary targets, 15 secondary targets, and five targets of opportunity. Two other aircraft did not drop their bombs: one jettisoned its pumpkin bomb into the sea near Iwo Jima, and the Strange Cargo's bomb came loose from the bomb rack and plunged through the closed bomb bay doors while the bomber was still on the ground. One B-29 incurred minor battle damage in the attacks. Flying at 30,000 feet (9,100 m) put them above the effective range of flak. Each pumpkin bomb mission was conducted by a formation of three aircraft in the hope of convincing the Japanese military that small groups of B-29s did not justify a strong response. This strategy proved successful, and Japanese fighters only occasionally attempted to intercept the 509th Composite Group's aircraft.
- 7 component-tests between 23 July and 8 August involving rehearsal drops of four inert Little Boy gun-type fission weapons and three Fat Man assemblies, and
- a practice mission on 29 July to Iwo Jima in which an inert Little Boy was unloaded and then reloaded to rehearse the contingency plan for using a back-up bomber in an emergency.

To accustom the Japanese to small groups of American bombers, training flights consisted of three planes that dropped a single bomb before returning to base. It was hoped that they would be allowed to carry out their job without any Japanese opposition.

While this training was taking place, the components of the first two atomic bombs were shipped to Tinian by various means. For the uranium bomb code-named "Little Boy", fissile components consisted of a cylindrical target and nine washer-like rings that made up the hollow cylinder projectile. When the bomb detonated, these would be brought together to create a cylindrical core. The uranium-235 projectile and bomb pre-assemblies (partly assembled bombs without the fissile components) left Hunters Point Naval Shipyard, California, on 16 July aboard the cruiser USS Indianapolis, arriving 26 July. The Little Boy pre-assemblies were designated L-1, L-2, L-3, L-4, L-5, L-6, L-7 and L-11. L-1, L-2, L-5 and L-6 were expended in test drops. L-6 was used in the Iwo Jima dress rehearsal on 29 July. This was repeated on 31 July, but this time L-6 was test dropped near Tinian by Enola Gay. L-11 was the assembly used for the Hiroshima bomb. On 26 July three C-54s of the 320th Troop Carrier Squadron left Kirtland Army Air Field, each with three of the uranium-235 target rings, and landed at North Field on 28 July.

The components for the bomb code-named the Fat Man arrived by air the same day. The bomb's plutonium core (encased in its insertion capsule) and the beryllium-polonium initiator were transported from Kirtland to Tinian by C-54 in the custody of Project Alberta couriers. Three Fat Man high explosive pre-assemblies designated F31, F32, and F33 were picked up at Kirtland on 28 July by three B-29s, two from the 509th and one from the 216th AAF Base Unit, and transported to North Field, arriving 2 August. The B-29s were Luke the Spook and Laggin' Dragon of the 509th, and 42-65386, a phase 3 Silverplate of the 216th AAF Base Unit. F33 was expended during the final rehearsal on 8 August, and F31 was the bomb dropped on Nagasaki. F32 presumably would have been used for a third attack or its rehearsal.

The final item of preparation for the operation came on 29 July 1945. Orders for the attack were issued to General Carl Spaatz on 25 July under the signature of General Thomas T. Handy, the acting Chief of Staff of the United States Army, since General of the Army George C. Marshall was at the Potsdam Conference with the President. The order designated four targets: Hiroshima, Kokura, Niigata, and Nagasaki, and ordered the attack to be made "as soon as weather will permit after about 3 August."

=== Atomic bomb missions ===
The mission profile for both atomic missions called for weather scouts to precede the strike force by an hour, reporting weather conditions in code over each proposed target. The strike force consisted of a bombing aircraft, with the aircraft commander responsible for all decisions in reaching the target and the bomb commander (weaponeer) responsible for all decisions regarding dropping of the bomb; a blast instrumentation aircraft which would fly the wing of the strike aircraft and drop instruments by parachute into the target area; and a camera ship, which would also carry scientific observers. Each mission had an additional "spare" aircraft pre-positioned on Iwo Jima to take over carrying the bomb if the strike aircraft encountered mechanical problems. The six combat crews of the Hiroshima mission were briefed on their targets, operational flight data, and the effects of the bomb on 4 August 1945. Their pre-mission briefing on 5 August, under the terms of Operations Order No. 35, covered details on weather and air-sea rescue. The Order described the bomb to be used as "special".

Special Mission 13, Primary target Hiroshima, 6 August 1945
Aircraft	Pilot	Call sign	Mission role
Straight Flush	Captain Claude R. Eatherly	Dimples 85	Weather reconnaissance (Hiroshima)
Jabit III	Captain John A. Wilson	Dimples 71	Weather reconnaissance (Kokura)
Full House	Captain Ralph R. Taylor	Dimples 83	Weather reconnaissance (Nagasaki)
Enola Gay	Colonel Paul W. Tibbets	Dimples 82	Weapon delivery
The Great Artiste	Major Charles W. Sweeney	Dimples 89	Blast measurement instrumentation
Necessary Evil	Captain George W. Marquardt	Dimples 91	Strike observation and photography
Big Stink	1st Lieutenant Charles F. McKnight	Dimples 90	Strike spare on Iwo Jima

Special Mission 13, attacking Hiroshima, was flown as planned and executed without significant problems or diversion from plan. Enola Gay took off at 02:45, 7.5 long tons (7.6 t) overweight and near maximum gross weight. Arming of the bomb began eight minutes into the flight and took 25 minutes. The three target-area aircraft arrived over Iwo Jima approximately three hours into the mission and departed together at 06:07. The safeties on the bomb were removed at 07:30, 90 minutes before time over target, and 15 minutes later the B-29s began a climb to the 30,000-foot (9,100 m) bombing altitude. The bomb run began at 09:12, with the drop three minutes later, after which the B-29s immediately performed steep diving turns. The detonation followed 45.5 seconds after the drop. Primary and "echo" shock waves overtook the B-29s a minute following the blast, and the smoke cloud was visible to the crews for 90 minutes, by which time they were almost 400 miles (640 km) away. Enola Gay returned to Tinian at 14:58.

Special Mission 16, Secondary target Nagasaki, 9 August 1945
Aircraft	Pilot	Call sign	Mission role
Enola Gay	Captain George W. Marquardt	Dimples 82	Weather reconnaissance (Kokura)
Laggin' Dragon	1st Lieutenant Charles F. McKnight	Dimples 95	Weather reconnaissance (Nagasaki)
Bockscar	Major Charles W. Sweeney	Dimples 77	Weapon delivery
The Great Artiste	Captain Frederick C. Bock	Dimples 89	Blast measurement instrumentation
Big Stink	Major James I. Hopkins, Jr.	Dimples 90	Strike observation and photography
Full House	Captain Ralph R. Taylor	Dimples 83	Strike spare on Iwo Jima

Mark 3 'Fat Man' detonation and ensuing mushroom cloud.

Special Mission 16 was moved up two days from 11 August because of adverse weather forecasts. Weather also dictated a change in rendezvous to Yakushima, much closer to the target, and an initial cruise altitude of 17,000 feet (5,200 m) instead of 9,300 feet (2,800 m), both of which considerably increased fuel consumption. Pre-flight inspection discovered an inoperative fuel transfer pump in the 625-US-gallon (2,370 L) aft bomb bay fuel tank, but a decision was made to continue anyway. The plutonium bomb did not require arming in flight, but did have its safeties removed 30 minutes after the 03:45 takeoff (all times Tinian; Nagasaki times were one hour earlier) when Bockscar reached 5,000 feet (1,500 m) of altitude. When the daylight rendezvous point was reached at 09:10, the photo plane failed to appear. The weather planes reported both targets within the required visual attack parameters while Bockscar circled Yakushima waiting for the photo plane. Finally the mission proceeded without the photo plane, thirty minutes behind schedule. When Bockscar arrived at Kokura 30 minutes later, cloud cover had increased to 70% of the area, and three bomb runs over the next 50 minutes were fruitless in bombing visually. The commanders decided to reduce power to conserve fuel and divert to Nagasaki, bombing by radar if necessary. The bomb run began at 11:58. (two hours behind schedule) using radar; but the Fat Man was dropped visually when a hole opened in the clouds at 12:01. The photo plane arrived at Nagasaki in time to complete its mission, and the three aircraft diverted to Okinawa, where they arrived at 13:00. Trying in vain for 20 minutes to contact the control tower at Yontan Airfield to obtain landing clearance, Bockscar nearly ran out of fuel.

While the Nagasaki mission was in progress, two B-29s of the 509th took off from Tinian to return to Wendover. The crews of Classen in the unnamed Victor 94, and Captain John A. Wilson in Jabit III, together with ground support crews, were sent back to the United States to stage for the possibility of transporting further bomb pre-assemblies to Tinian. Groves expected to have another atomic bomb ready for shipment on 13 August and use on 19 August, with three more available in September and a further three in October. Groves ordered that all shipments of material be stopped on 13 August, when the third bomb was still at Site Y. (Note: Tibbets, in a 1994 interview aired during the Smithsonian Networks program Smithsonian Channel's War Stories (1995, "The Men Who Brought the Dawn"), stated that a third bomb was available "at Wendover" and that "the bomb" had been transported as far as Mather Field when further missions were cancelled. However, since plutonium cores and initiators were transported separately by courier from Los Alamos, it is likely that if any part of a bomb had been en route, it was only a bomb pre-assembly, possibly to have a second in place in addition to F32 and thus permit a rehearsal before any third mission. Sources familiar with Groves state categorically that even though physicist Robert F. Bacher had signed for receipt of the core and initiator, the order to halt shipment reached Los Alamos before the pit left the site. Lawren 1988, p. 253; Campbell 2005, p. 39)

=== Post atomic bomb operations ===
After each atomic mission the group conducted other combat operations, making a series of pumpkin bomb attacks on 8 and 14 August. Six B-29s visually attacked targets at Yokkaichi, Uwajima, Tsuruga, and Tokushima on 8 August, bombing two primary and three secondary targets with five bombs. Seven aircraft visually attacked Koromo and Nagoya on 14 August. Some Punkins (Crew B-7, Price) is believed to have dropped the last bombs by the Twentieth Air Force in World War II. After the announcement of the Japanese surrender, the 509th Composite Group flew three further training missions involving 31 sorties on 18, 20 and 22 August, then stood down from operations. The group made a total of 210 operational sorties from 30 June to 22 August, aborted four additional flights, and had only a single aircraft fail to take off. Altogether, 140 sorties involved the dropping of live ordnance. Some 60 flights were credited as combat missions: 49 pumpkin bomb and 11 atomic bomb sorties.

Three B-29s (Full House, Straight Flush, and Top Secret) flew six combat missions each. Crews A-1 (Taylor) and C-11 (Eatherly) flew the most combat missions, six (including one atomic mission) each, while six other crews each flew five. Only the late arrivals (A-2 [Costello] and C-12 [Zahn]) did not participate in any combat missions, although Costello's B-29 was used by another crew for weather reconnaissance of Nagasaki on the second mission. Including training and test flights, crews B-8 (McKnight) and C-13 (Bock) flew the most missions, with 20 total (5 combat). Crew B-7 (Price) is the only crew to fly all of its missions (18 total, 5 combat) in its normally assigned aircraft, Some Punkins.

The 509th Composite Group returned to the United States on 6 November 1945, and was stationed at Roswell Army Airfield, New Mexico. Colonel William H. Blanchard replaced Tibbets as group commander on 22 January 1946, and also became the first commander of the 509th Bombardment Wing. It was one of the original ten bombardment groups assigned to Strategic Air Command when it was formed on 21 March 1946. The 715th and 830th Bombardment Squadrons were assigned to the 509th on 6 May 1946, and the group was redesignated the 509th Bombardment Group, Very Heavy on 10 July. The 320th Troop Carrier Squadron was inactivated on 19 August. At Roswell, the 509th became the nuclear strike and deterrence core of the Strategic Air Command, and was the only unit capable of delivery of nuclear weapons until June 1948, when B-50 Superfortresses were initially deployed. The 509th itself converted to the B-50 in 1950, and transferred its Silverplate B-29s to the squadrons of the 97th Bombardment Wing at Biggs Air Force Base, Texas.

General Groves later saw a lack of foresight of himself and others, as sixteen years after in 1961 only four officers were still on active duty; Tibbets plus Ashworthy (a weaponeer) and two bombardiers, Ferebee and Beahan; so few men experienced with atomic weapons were still in the USAF.

== Organization ==
Wartime command organization
Position	Name	Dates of service
Group commander	Colonel Paul W. Tibbets, Jr.	17 December 1944 – 22 January 1946
Deputy group commander	Lieutenant Colonel Thomas J. Classen	4 May 1945 –
Group operations officer (S-3)	Major James I. Hopkins, Jr.	17 December 1944 –
Group intelligence officer (S-2)	Lieutenant Colonel Hazen J. Payette	17 December 1944 –
Group executive officer	Lieutenant Colonel Gerald E. Bean	17 December 1944 –
Group adjutant	Captain Thomas L. Karnes	17 December 1944 –

393d Bombardment Squadron (Very Heavy)
Wartime Commander	Date of command
Major Thomas J. Classen	12 March 1944¹
Lieutenant Colonel Paul W. Tibbets	14 September 1944
Lieutenant Colonel Thomas J. Classen	17 December 1944
Major Charles W. Sweeney	4 May 1945
Postwar Commander	Date of command
Lieutenant Colonel Virgil M. Cloyd	1 July 1946
Lieutenant Colonel Phillip Y. Williams	1 June 1948
Lieutenant Colonel Robert B. Irwin	3 September 1948
Lieutenant Colonel Phillip Y. Williams	15 October 1948
Lieutenant Colonel James I. Hopkins	3 January 1949
Lieutenant Colonel Phillip Y. Williams	20 January 1949
Lieutenant Colonel Jack D. Nole	3 May 1949
Lieutenant Colonel Phillip Y. Williams	13 June 1949
Lieutenant Colonel William S. Martensen	30 June 1949

¹The 393d Bombardment Squadron was part of the 504th Bombardment Group (VH) from 12 March to 14 September 1944.

320th Troop Carrier Squadron
Commander	Date of command
Major Hubert J. Konopacki	17 December 1944¹
Major Charles W. Sweeney	6 January 1945
Captain John J. Casey, Jr.	4 May 1945²

¹The 320th Troop Carrier Squadron was activated on 17 December 1944, and²disbanded 19 August 1946.

Component support organizations
Unit	Commander	# of personnel
Headquarters and Base Services Squadron	Major George W. Westcott	99
390th Air Service Group	Lieutenant Colonel John W. Porter	190
1027th Air Materiel Squadron	Major Guy Geller	140
603rd Air Engineering Squadron	Captain Earl O. Casey	225
1395th Military Police Company	Captain Louis Schaffer	127
1st Ordnance Squadron, Special (Aviation)	Major Charles F. H. Begg	298

== Depictions ==
The training and operations of the 509th Composite Group were dramatized in a Hollywood film, Above and Beyond (1952), with Robert Taylor cast in the role of Tibbets. The story was retold in a partly fictionalized made-for-television film Enola Gay: The Men, the Mission, the Atomic Bomb (1980), with Patrick Duffy portraying Tibbets.

== Lineage ==
- Established as 509th Composite Group on 9 December 1944

Activated on 17 December 1944
Redesignated: 509th Bombardment Group, Very Heavy, on 10 July 1946
Redesignated: 509th Bombardment Group, Medium, on 2 July 1948
Inactivated on 16 June 1952

- Redesignated 509th Operations Group on 12 March 1993

Activated on 15 July 1993

Source: Fact Sheet – 509 Operations Group (ACC)

== Assignments ==
- Second Air Force, 17 December 1944;
- 315th Bombardment Wing, 18 December 1944;
- 313th Bombardment Wing, c. June 1945;
- Second Air Force, 10 October 1945;
- 58th Bombardment Wing, 17 January 1946;
- Fifteenth Air Force, 31 March 1946

Source: Fact Sheet – 509 Operations Group (ACC)

== Stations ==
- Wendover Army Air Field, Utah, 17 December 1944
- North Field, Tinian, 29 May 1945
- Roswell Army Airfield, New Mexico, 6 November 1945

Source: Maurer 1983, p. 372

== Campaigns ==

Air Combat, Asiatic-Pacific Campaign
Air Offensive, Japan
Eastern Mandates
Western Pacific

Source: Maurer 1983, p. 372

== Honors ==

Department of the Air Force Special Order GB-294, dated 2 September 1999, awarded the Air Force Outstanding Unit Award (with Valor) to the 509th Composite Group for outstanding achievement in combat for the period 1 July 1945 to 14 August 1945.
