= 3030th AAF Base Unit =

- Active: 1944–1945
- Country: United States
- Branch: United States Army Air Forces
- Type: Wing
- Role: Bombardier training, Flight and Technical training
- Size: Unit
- Garrison/HQ: Walker Air Force Base
- Engagements: World War II: World War II American Theater

The 3030th AAF Base Unit (Pilot School, Specialized Very Heavy) was a United States Army Air Forces training unit. It specialized in training the crews of Boeing B-29 Superfortress bombers, as well as pilot transition from twin-engine fighters to four-engine aircraft. It was one of the first established training schools of B-29s in the United States Military, and was essential in proving the effectiveness and versatility of the aircraft. The unit was formed on 30 April 1944, and was discontinued on 1 November 1945.

== Operational history ==
The 3030th AAF Base Unit was formed on 30 April 1944, at Walker Air Force Base, as one of the first training schools of B-29 Superfortress bombers in the United States. When performing drills on the bombing target adjacent to the runway, the B-29 bombers used sand and flour bags as makeshift bombs, instead of actual ammunition. When actual rounds of ammunition or bombs needed to be used, the practice bombing and gunnery ranges due south of the air field, and on Matagorda Island, were used. Since some of the aircraft that the unit used were experimental or prototype B-29s, the 3030th AAF Base Unit lost many men in malfunctions of equipment on the aircraft. Plane crashes, although infrequent, happened a number of times throughout the unit's history.
