= Claude Eatherly =

US Army Air Forces officer (1918–1978)

Claude Robert Eatherly
- Born: October 2, 1918; Van Alstyne, Texas, US
- Died: July 1, 1978 (aged 59)
- Military career
- Allegiance: United States of America
- Branch: United States Army Air Forces
- Rank: Major
- Units: 509th Composite Group; 308th Bomb Wing
- Conflicts: World War II atomic bombing of Hiroshima

Claude Robert Eatherly (October 2, 1918 – July 1, 1978) was an officer in the U.S. Army Air Forces during World War II. He piloted the weather reconnaissance aircraft Straight Flush that supported the atomic bombing of Hiroshima.

== Early life and education ==
Claude Eatherly was born in Van Alstyne, Texas, fifty miles northeast of Dallas. His parents, James E. “Bud” Eatherly and Edna Bell George, were both farmers, and Eatherly himself dropped out of North Texas State Teachers' College in Denton in his senior year to join the Army Air Corps in December, 1940. He graduated from bomber school and was commissioned a second lieutenant in August, 1941.

== Career and the bombing of Hiroshima ==
Eatherly was the pilot of Straight Flush, one of seven B-29s of the 393d Bomb Squadron of the 509th Composite Group that took part in the Hiroshima mission, which was the culmination of ten months of training during World War II. It departed Tinian Island at approximately 0137 hours on the morning of August 6, 1945, a little more than an hour ahead of the Enola Gay (which carried the bomb) and flew over Hiroshima with the task of reporting the weather conditions. After reporting the weather was good over the target, Eatherly turned Straight Flush for home, and was over 300 miles (480 km) from ground zero when the bomb exploded.

== Later life ==
Eatherly desperately wanted to remain in the air force, but — following reassignment to meteorology training — was caught cheating on coursework and ousted into honorable discharge. He left the Air Force in 1947 as a major, and worked at an oil company in Houston, Texas where he became a sales manager for a Mobil gasoline station. Consumed by guilt, he attempted suicide by drugs in a hotel in New Orleans, but he survived and was treated in Waco, Texas in a psychiatric hospital for soldiers. His mental condition slowly deteriorated.

Jerome Klinkowitz, in Pacific Skies: American Flyers in World War II, writes:

Shortly after leaving the Air Force in 1947, Eatherly took part in arrangements for a raid on Cuba by American adventurers hoping to overthrow the government; here the former weather pilot's responsibilities would involve a flight of bomb-laden P-38 Lightnings obtained as war surplus. The plot was uncovered, and Eatherly was arrested and prosecuted, serving time in jail for this offense.

Eatherly claimed to have become horrified by his participation in the Hiroshima bombing, and hopeless at the possibility of repenting for or earning forgiveness for willfully extinguishing so many lives and causing so much pain. He tried speaking out with pacifist groups, sending parts of his paycheck to Hiroshima, writing letters of apology, and once or twice may have attempted suicide. At one point "he set out to try to discredit the popular myth of the war hero [by] committing petty crimes from which he derived no benefit: he was tried for various forgeries and forged a check for a small amount and contributed the money to a fund for the children of Hiroshima. He held up banks and broke into post offices without ever taking anything." He was convicted of forgery in New Orleans, Louisiana and served one year between 1954 and 1955 for the crime. He was also convicted of breaking and entering in West Texas. He then became a salesman in a garage and might have attempted suicide again by drug. In 1959 he avoided prosecution for robbery by entering the Veterans Administration Hospital in Waco, Texas for many months. Some think he committed antisocial acts because of schizophrenia or anxiety disorder.

It was in this hospital that he began to correspond with Günther Anders, a German philosopher and pacifist, who became his friend in a battle to promote the abolition of nuclear weapons. Eatherly wrote:

Whilst in no sense, I hope, either a religious or a political fanatic, I have for some time felt convinced that the crisis in which we are all involved is one calling for a thorough re-examination of our whole scheme of values and of loyalties. In the past it has sometimes been possible for men to "coast along" without posing to themselves too many searching questions about the way they are accustomed to think and to act — but it is reasonably clear now that our age is not one of these. On the contrary I believe that we are rapidly approaching a situation in which we shall be compelled to re-examine our willingness to surrender responsibility for our thoughts and actions to some social institution such as the political party, trade union, church or State. None of these institutions are adequately equipped to offer infallible advice on moral issues and their claim to offer such advice needs therefore to be challenged.

William Bradford Huie, in The Hiroshima Pilot, cast doubt on the Eatherly story, pointing out that Eatherly continued to practice for potential future nuclear bombing missions in the years following the war. He believes that pacifist and anti-nuclear activists created or exaggerated elements of Eatherly's story for propaganda purposes, and that Eatherly cooperated in this mythmaking from desire for fame or attention. Some of this skepticism was disputed in Dark Star by Ronnie Dugger. No other persons involved with the bombing of Hiroshima expressed guilt in the way that Eatherly did. Enola Gay pilot and commanding officer of the 509th Composite Group, Colonel Paul Tibbets, said in his autobiography "Flight of the Enola Gay" that he couldn't understand why Eatherly felt so guilty. While Eatherly did command the weather B-29 that scouted Hiroshima about an hour ahead of Tibbet's B-29 (which was carrying the "Little Boy" atomic bomb), "Buck" Eatherly had already turned back for their Tinian Island base by the time the bomb was dropped. To quote Tibbets: "Actually, Major Eatherly did not take part in the attack and did not see the bomb blast that was supposed to have haunted him through many sleepless nights." Contrary to popular opinion, one of Eatherly's Straight Flush crewmen has suggested that Eatherly was actually upset that the Hiroshima raid had not made him famous, and was only too eager to play to the journalists that came to get the story of the "distraught pilot".

Eatherly died in 1978 at the Veterans Hospital in Houston, of cancer. He left behind a wife, Ann, and two daughters.

== Awards and decorations ==
- Air Medal.
