= Jabit III =

Boeing B-29 Superfortress involved in the atomic bomb attack on Hiroshima

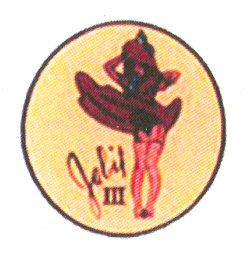
- Nose art for Jabit III

General information
- Type: Boeing B-29-36-MO Superfortress
- Manufacturer: Glenn L. Martin Company
- Owners: United States Army Air Force
- Serial: 44-27303
- Radio code: Victor 1, later Victor 71

History
- Manufactured: Delivered to the USAAF on April 3, 1945
- In service: April 3, 1945 - 1946
- Fate: Scrapped after being damaged in a landing accident

Jabit III (alternately spelled Jabbitt III) was the name of a B-29 Superfortress (B-29-36-MO 44-27303, Victor number 71) participating in the atomic bomb attack on Hiroshima on August 6, 1945. Assigned to the 393d Bomb Squadron, 509th Composite Group, Jabit III was used as a weather reconnaissance aircraft and flew to the city of Kokura, designated as the secondary target, before the final bombing to determine if conditions were favorable for an attack.

== History ==
One of 15 Silverplate B-29's used by the 509th CG, Jabit III was manufactured at the Glenn L. Martin Aircraft Plant at Omaha, Nebraska, as a block 35 Superfortress, one of 10 redesignated block 36 in recognition of its Silverplate status. It was delivered to the USAAF on April 3, 1945. Assigned to Crew B-6 (Captain John A. Wilson, Aircraft Commander), Jabit III was flown to its home base at Wendover Army Air Field, Utah, in April 1945, departing Wendover for North Field, Tinian on June 5, 1945, arriving on June 11.

Jabit III was originally assigned the Victor (unit-assigned aircraft identification) number 1 but on August 1 was given the large 'A' tail markings of the 497th Bomb Group as a security measure and had its Victor number changed to 71, to avoid misidentification with actual 497th BG aircraft. Jabit III was used by the group commander, Col. Paul Tibbets, on July 24 and 25 to drop two dummy Little Boy atomic bomb assemblies into the ocean off Tinian to test fire their radar altimeter components.

In addition to the Hiroshima mission and two test flights, Jabit III was flown by Capt. Wilson and crew B-6 on ten training and practice missions, and three combat missions, dropping pumpkin bombs on industrial targets in Taira, Ube, and Uwajima. 1st Lt. Ralph Devore and crew A-3 flew Jabit III on a pumpkin bomb mission to Osaka.

Jabit III and crew B-6 were one of two sent back to Wendover on August 9, 1945, to stage for possibly bringing back the plutonium core and initiator for a third atomic bomb, but the war ended before that occurred. The aircraft had been unnamed when it left Tinian but was possibly given a name and nose art during its return to the United States. It was damaged in a landing accident in Chicago on September 29, 1945, while on a training flight and was scrapped in April 1946.

== Hiroshima mission crew ==
Crew B-6 (regularly assigned to Jabit III)

- Capt. John A. Wilson, Aircraft Commander
- 2nd Lt. Ellsworth T. Carrington, Co-Pilot
- 2nd Lt. James S. Duva, Navigator
- 2nd Lt. Paul W. Gruning, Bombardier
- M/Sgt. James W. Davis, Flight Engineer
- S/Sgt. Glen H. Floweree, Radio Operator
- Sgt. Vernon J. Rowley, Radar Operator
- Cpl. Chester A. Rogalski, Tail Gunner
- Cpl. Donald L. Rowe, Assistant Engineer/Scanner

== Other aircraft named Jabit III ==
Two FB-111A strategic bombers of the USAF 509th Bomb Wing, serials 67-7193 and 68-0258, carried the original nose art of Jabit III on their nosewheel doors while based at Pease Air Force Base, New Hampshire, in the 1970s and 1980s. -7193 was named Jabitt III and -0258 Jabit IV.

== Sources ==
- Campbell, Richard H., The Silverplate Bombers: A History and Registry of the Enola Gay and Other B-29s Configured to Carry Atomic Bombs (2005), ISBN 0-7864-2139-8
- 509th CG Aircraft Page, MPHPA
