= North Field (Tinian) =

Former World War II airfield on Tinian in the Mariana Islands

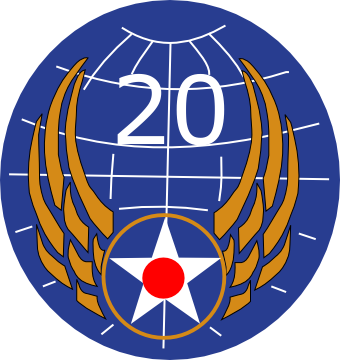
North Field Ushi Point Airfield
- Part of Twentieth Air Force
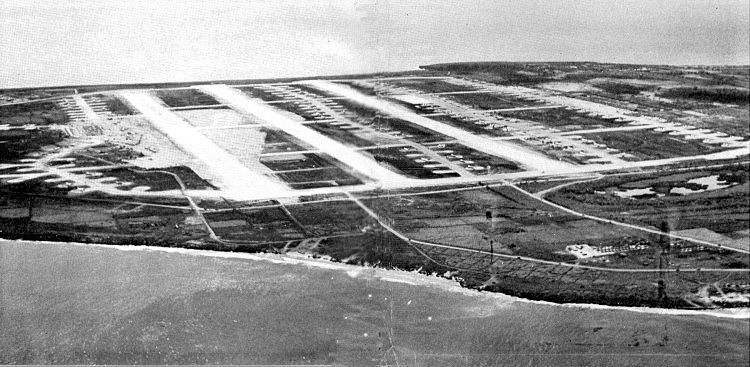
- Oblique airphoto of North Field, Tinian, 1945, showing the massive runway system and number of hardstands. On each hardstand, a B-29 was parked and maintained.

Site information
- Type: Military airfield
- Controlled by: United States Army Air Forces

Location
- Coordinates: 15°04′19.36″N 145°38′18.13″E

Site history
- Built: 1944
- In use: 1944–1946

North Field is a World War II airfield on Tinian in the Mariana Islands which was abandoned after the war. A tourist attraction today, some refurbishments for active use have begun in the 2020s. Along with several adjacent beaches on which U.S. Marines landed during the Battle of Tinian, the airfield is the major component of the National Historic Landmark District Tinian Landing Beaches, Ushi Point Field, Tinian Island.

North Field was one of several bases for Twentieth Air Force Boeing B-29 Superfortress operations against the Japanese Home Islands in 1944–45. North Field contributed aircraft to the 1945 campaign to burn out Japanese cities with incendiary bombs, including the 9 March 1945 bombing of Tokyo which still stands as the most destructive air raid ever. North Field was the base for the 313th Bombardment Wing which carried out Operation Starvation, the dropping of naval mines in the harbors and sea lanes used by Japan. North Field was also the base for the 509th Composite Group which flew the atomic bombing raids on Hiroshima and Nagasaki in August 1945. The incendiary campaign (which destroyed 40% of the targeted cities), the aerial mining campaign (which starved Japan of essential food imports) and the two atomic attacks have all been argued as major factors in the surrender of Japan.

== History ==
=== Ushi Point Airfield ===
Tinian, with its sister islands of the Marianas, had passed through Spanish and German hands before becoming a protectorate of Japan following World War I. Under Japanese administration, Tinian was largely a sugar plantation. In 1939, large-scale military construction began on Tinian by the Japanese military, with 1,200 prisoners sent to the island from Japan for the construction of airfields as part of the defense of the Mariana Islands. By 1944, the island had three military airfields with a fourth under construction. What would become North Field was a Japanese airstrip 4,380 feet in length, known as Ushi Point Airfield and was home to the Nakajima C6N-1 reconnaissance aircraft of the 121st Kokutai Imperial Japanese Navy Air Service. Until the spring of 1944, the base remained largely out of major action.

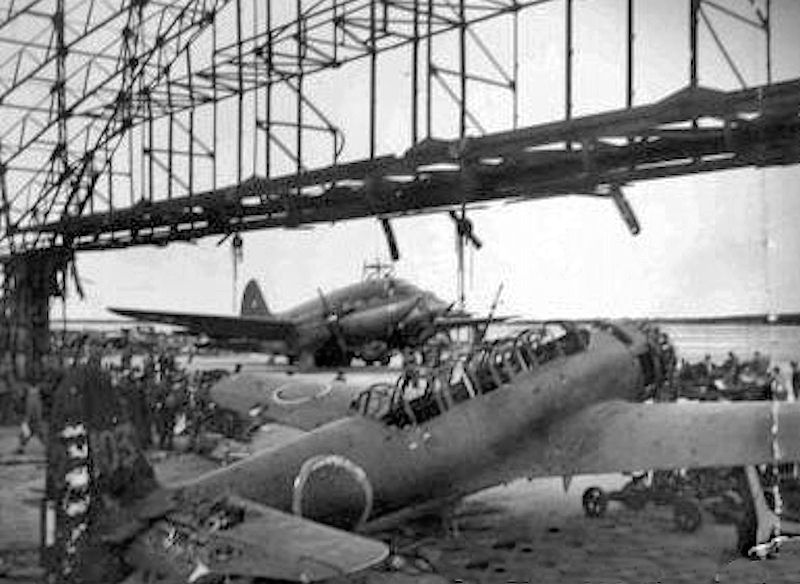
Nakajima C6N-1 reconnaissance aircraft of the 121st Kokutai after being captured on Tinian, July 1944

By mid-1944, the Americans had advanced inside the Japanese ring of defense in the Pacific Theater. Tinian, located approximately 1,500 miles from mainland Japan, was well-suited for the United States Army Air Forces to establish a large staging area from which to conduct long-range strategic offensive air operations over the Japanese Home Islands with the new Boeing B-29 Superfortress. During early 1944, the B-29 heavy bombers were operating ineffectively from bases in China. Stationing the Superfortresses in the Marianas brought Japan within their effective range of operation, as well as provided the Twentieth Air Force with reliable means of support from the western ports of the United States.

The Ushi Point Airfield and its assigned aircrews did their part to repel American advances in the Marianas Islands, but following the fall of Guam and Saipan to American forces in July 1944 it became clear that Tinian would be attacked next. Assaulted on 24 July by United States Marines from Saipan, the airfield was almost totally destroyed by the American naval bombardment and air attack prior to the assault by the 4th Marine Division. The Japanese were taken by surprise, with several aircraft being captured relatively intact inside a hangar. The offensive was regarded as one of the best-executed amphibious operations of the war. Ushi Point airfield fell to U.S. forces on 26 July and was almost immediately handed over to the care of U.S. Navy Construction Battalions, or Seabees. 1,500 Seabees landed with the initial forces on Tinian in July 1944 and immediately set to work repairing the damaged Japanese Ushi Point Airfield, even before the fighting had ended.

=== Construction ===
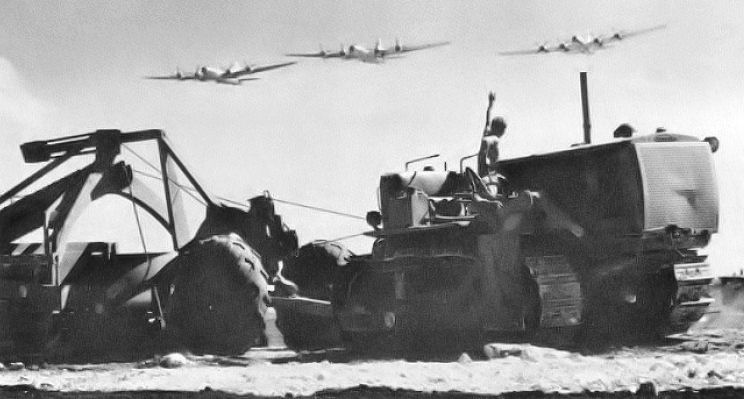
US Navy Seabee view USAAF B-29 Superfortresses arriving at North Field, 1944

Once under American control, a massive construction project was begun on the north end of Tinian. Operating for over 45 days and nights, often while under fire, the Seabees initially repaired and extended the existing 4,380 foot runway and then added two runways, each 8,000 feet long and lying in an east-west direction. Nearly the entire northern end of the island was occupied by runways, the airfield area, and the various support facilities and containment areas.

North Field was further expanded with three 8,000 feet runways involving the movement of nearly 1 million cubic yards of earth and coral and the accumulation of some 900,000 truck miles. A fourth runway was constructed in May 1945 and hardstands built for 265 B-29 bombers. The four parallel 8,000 foot runways are oriented nearly east-west. Upon completion, North Field was the largest airfield in the world.

=== 313th Bombardment Wing ===
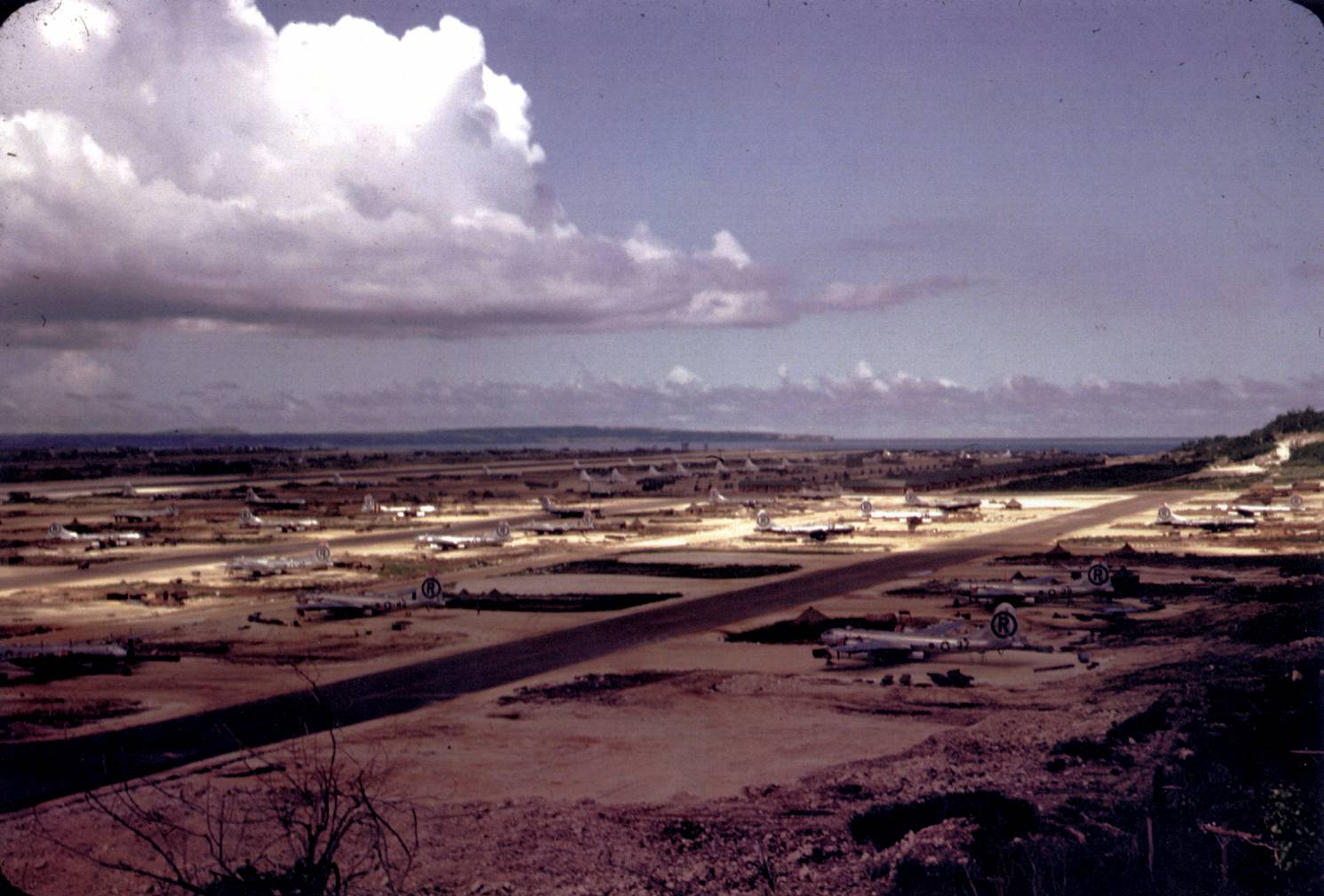
North Field in 1945, prior to the bombings of Hiroshima and Nagasaki by the 509th Composite Group

North Field came under the command of Twentieth Air Force XXI Bomber Command, with the 313th Bombardment Wing being the host unit at the expansive station in December 1944. Its operational groups were:

- 6th Bombardment Group (Circle R)
- 9th Bombardment Group (Circle X)
- 504th Bombardment Group (Circle E)
- 505th Bombardment Group (Circle W)
- 5th Photographic Reconnaissance Squadron (Very Long Range)

The four runways at North Field were lettered "A", "B", "C" and "D" from north to south. The 6th Group was parked on the south side of Runway D, then going north the 9th Group was parked between C and D. The 504th between C and B, and the 505th on the north side of runway A. In addition, the B-29s were assigned specific hardstands for each aircraft so the ground crew could store spares and other items for each aircraft on them. The groups used the runway to the north side of their parking area hardstands, but this was not fast and firm, because if there was an accident and the runway was closed, the aircraft shifted to another runway.

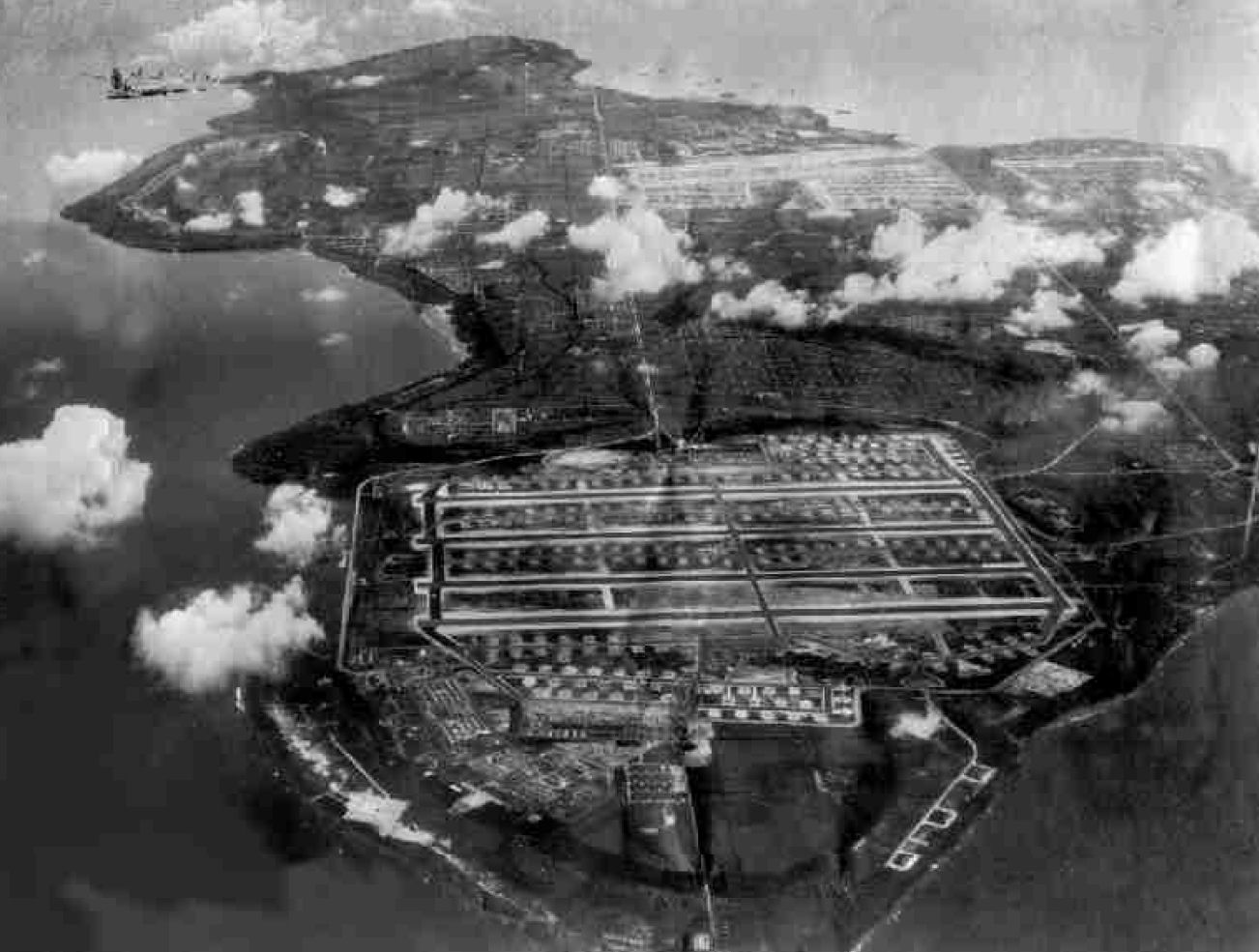
Tinian, Mariana Islands, 1945 after airfield construction, looking north to south. The massive North Field, 313th Bombardment Wing in front, West Field, 58th Bombardment Wing, in background. The 313th BW consisted of 4 B-29 Superfortress Bombardment Groups, later adding the 509th Composite Group, which conducted the Atomic Bomb Attacks against Japan in August 1945.

Once in place, the groups of the 313th began flying missions, initially against Iwo Jima, the Truk Islands, and other Japanese held areas. Later, they flew low-level night incendiary raids on area targets in Japan; participated in mining operations in the Shimonoseki Strait, and contributed to the blockade of the Japanese Empire by mining harbors in Japan and Korea. In April 1945 the 313th assisted the invasion of Okinawa by bombing Japanese airfields used by kamikaze pilots.

The 509th Composite Group was assigned to the wing in May 1945 from Wendover Army Air Force Base, Utah. The 509th, although assigned to the 313th Bomb Wing, was operationally controlled by Headquarters, Twentieth Air Force. The 509th was given a base area near the airfield on the north tip of the island, several miles from the main installations in the center part of the island where the other groups were assigned. The 509th aircraft almost always used runway "A" and the aircraft were parked away from the other groups on the north side of the runway. Also unlike the other groups in the wing, the 509th used a wide variety of tail codes from various XXI Bomber Command groups, instead of using its own, so that the group's planes could not be identified by the Japanese. The 509th was also self-contained and drew little in resources from the 313th Wing or its other groups. In early August, the mission of the 509th was revealed when the group flew the atomic bomb missions over Hiroshima and Nagasaki. In November, the 509th was relieved from assignment to the 313th Bomb Wing and was reassigned to Roswell Army Air Base, New Mexico.

After the Japanese surrender in August, 313th Bomb Wing units dropped food and supplies to Allied prisoners of war and participated in show-of-force flights over Japan. The units of the 313th Bombardment Wing were either reassigned or inactivated within a few months after the end of the Pacific War. The last USAAF unit, the 505th Bombardment Group, left North Field on 30 June 1946, ending its use as an operational airfield. The 313th Bombardment Wing moved to Clark Field, Philippines on 1 February 1946. The base was placed in a standby status until being closed on 30 March 1947.

== Abandonment ==
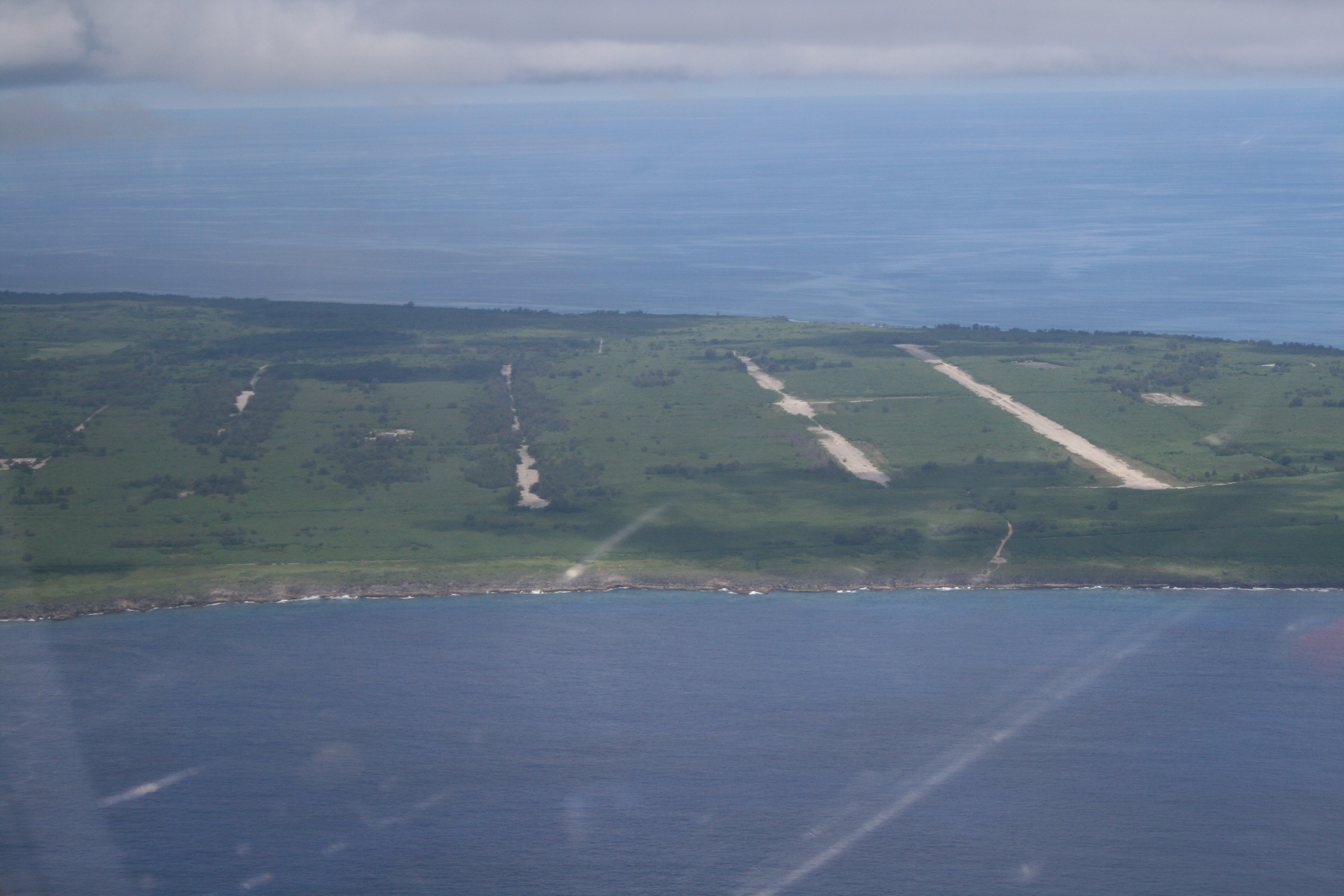
North Field, 27 August 2008

Having no real purpose or any use after 1947, North Field was officially abandoned by the USAAF. Immediately after the war, the locals on the island did not have to farm for the first two years after the airfield was abandoned because the withdrawing American military forces left entire stocks of almost everything ranging from food, brand-new military uniforms and even ice-cream makers (these were simply left behind in North Field's many warehouses). Any of the locals who wanted to get a vehicle could just do so by heading to the airfield and drive it until it could not be repaired. Some abandoned B-29 aircraft wrecks were also left behind at the airfield after the war ended, and these were melted down for scrap metal in the 1950s.

The airfield has been steadily reclaimed by the dense tropical jungle on the island, being thoroughly abandoned and heavily overgrown. It is easily accessible by travelling just a few miles north of San Jose on the main north-south road, which is known as "Broadway". The runways (constructed out of crushed coral) are grayish-looking and quite weathered, but Runway Able and Runway Baker and some of the taxiways remain usable for driving on in an ordinary car, with considerable weed growth on the surface.

Other than the two worn-out runways, the taxiways, the empty remnants of the former Japanese-built administration buildings and the preserved loading/storage pits where the atomic bombs were loaded on the bomber aircraft, there is not much left of the old airfield. The forest has grown up to the edges of the runways and taxiways. The surviving airfield administration buildings, along with the airfield and the nearby landing beaches of White One and White Two, were designated a National Historic Landmark District for their role in the war.

== Reuse ==
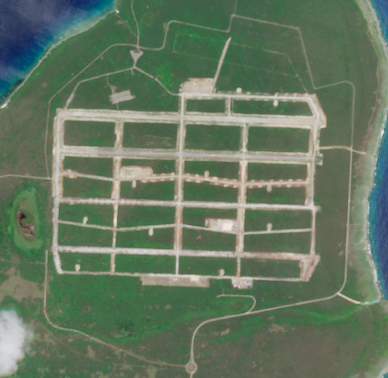
North Field, Copernicus Sentinel-2, June 15, 2025.

In 2003 Runway Able was cleared/grubbed and the flight path was brought up to current FAA requirements by the Seabees in preparation for Exercise Tandem Thrust, a joint exercise with the U.S. Marine Corps, Navy Seabees and U.S. Army 25th Infantry Division. The Seabees successfully defended the runway and base from the Army's attack and then assisted the Army in creating the defenses against the Marines. Aircraft used in the attack were CH-47 and CH-53 helicopters. Runway Baker and adjoining taxiways were cleared for ease of access. In addition, the Seabees donated additional time and help with several community projects. The secondary benefit of the clear and grub effort was the ability of the runway to be used by the Guam Air National Guard for training.

In 2013, Baker runway was partially refurbished by the Marine Corps for Exercise Forager Fury II. The exercise was a demonstration of the Marine Wing Support Squadron 171's ability to displace rapidly and generate significant combat power in an expeditionary environment. A Marine Corps KC-130J Super Hercules landed on the runway 5 December 2013, the second aircraft to use North Field since 1947. In the case of a surprise Chinese ballistic missile attack on U.S. air bases in Japan and South Korea, aircraft could be rapidly dispersed on WWII Pacific airfields, including Tinian.

=== Reactivation ===
In late 2023 the U.S. Air Force began work on more extensive vegetation removal and pavement restoration, as part of a program to create dispersal bases for aircraft in the event of a confrontation with China. $78 million was budgeted in the Air Force's 2024 budget request for work at North Field. Work will also take place at Tinian International Airport. The 823rd RED HORSE Squadron (Rapid Engineer Deployable Heavy Operational Repair Squadron Engineers) from Hurlburt Field arrived at Tinian tasked with clearing eight decades of overgrowth, and left by April. The 820th and 555th RED HORSE Squadrons also arrived from Nellis Air Force Base tasked with similar operations. The Navy Seabees have also moved in to clear up 20 million square feet of degraded pavement. A five-year, $409 million contract has been awarded in 2024 to upgrade the airfield. Initial operations began on 31 May 2026, and a detachment of 250 personnel was deployed to support Army operations from the airfield during Exercise Valiant Shield 2026. Two of the four runways are scheduled for completion by 2027.

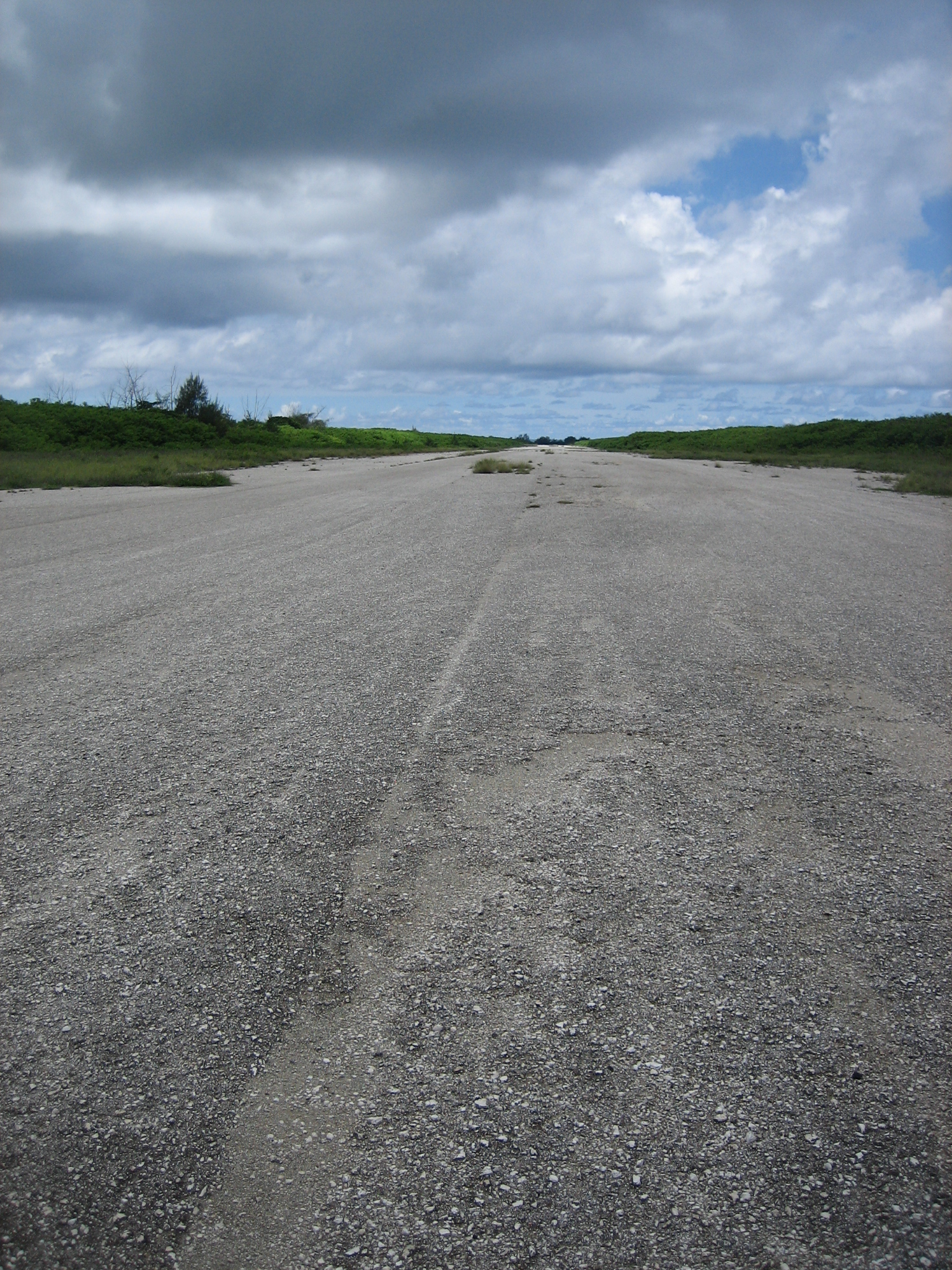
Runway Able in 2008

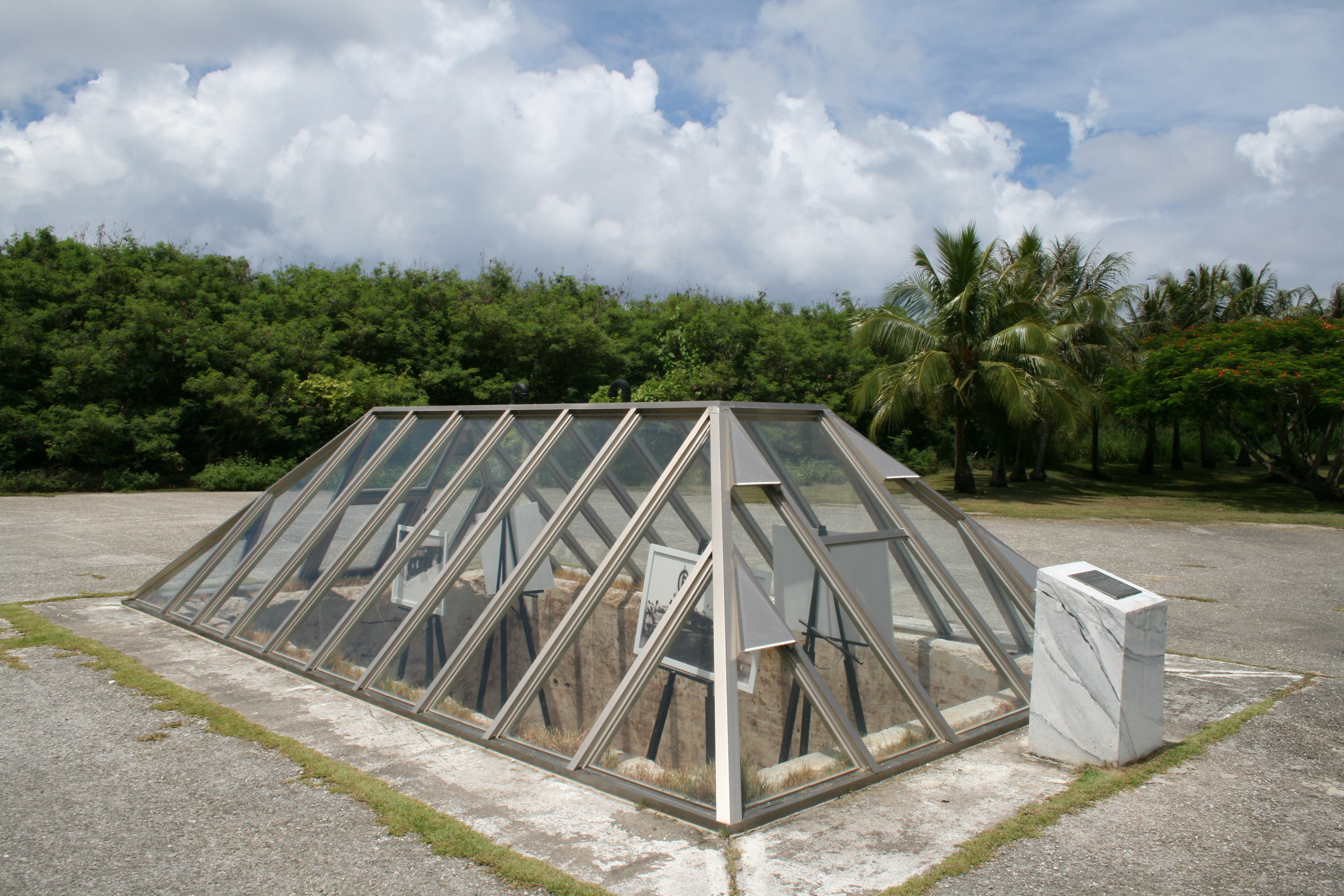
No. 1 Atomic Bomb (Little Boy) loading pit in 2008

== See also ==
- West Field (Tinian)
- USAAF in the Central Pacific
- List of United States National Historic Landmarks in United States commonwealths and territories, associated states, and foreign states
- National Register of Historic Places listings in the Northern Mariana Islands
