= Walker Air Force Base =

U.S. Air Force base near Roswell, New Mexico

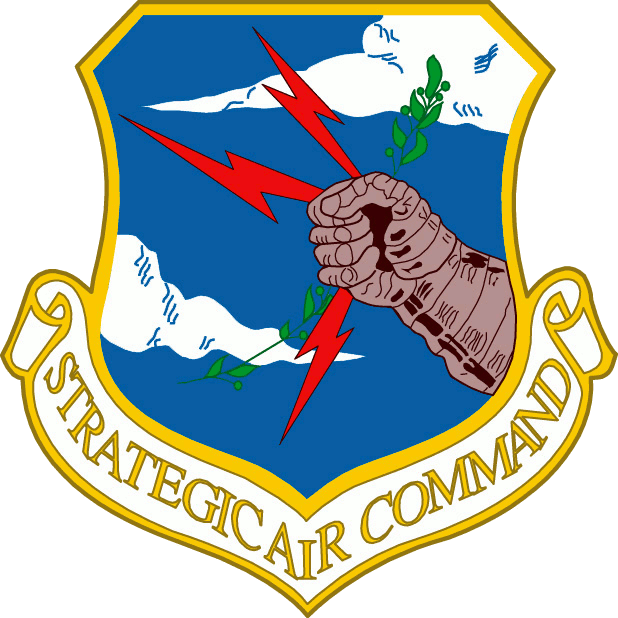
Walker Air Force Base Roswell Army Airfield
- Part of Strategic Air Command
- Roswell, New Mexico
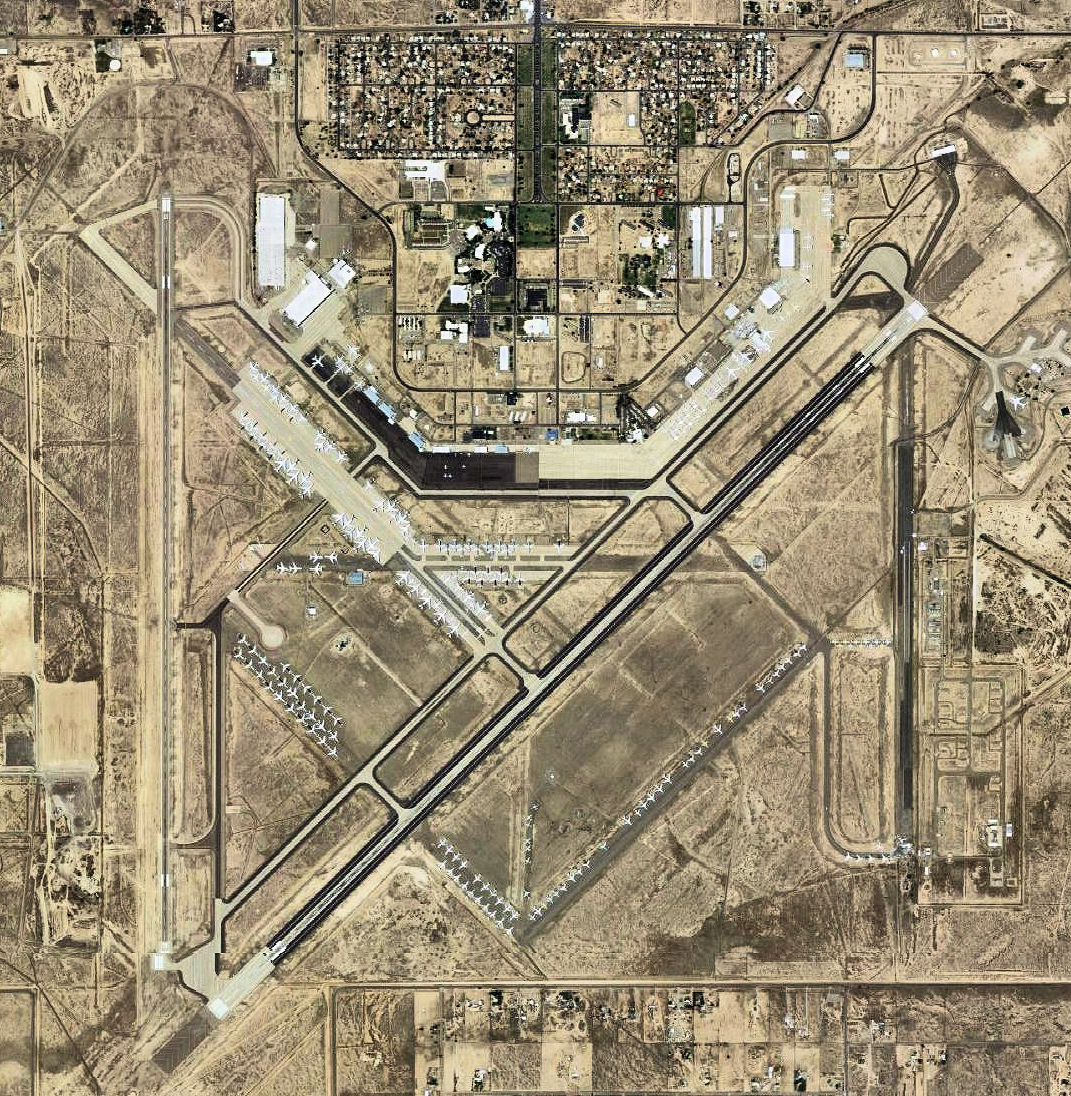
- 2006 United States Geological Survey aerial photo

Site information
- Type: Air Force base

Location
- Location within New Mexico
- Coordinates: 33°18′06″N 104°31′50″W

Site history
- Built: 1941
- In use: 1941–1967

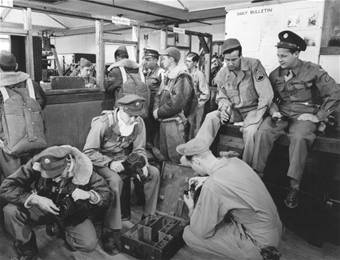
Enlisted men selecting cameras to go up in a Beechcraft AT-11 on bomb-spotting missions at Roswell Army Flying School

Walker Air Force Base is a former United States Air Force base located three miles (5 km) south of the central business district of Roswell, New Mexico. It was opened in 1941 as an Army Air Corps flying school and was active during World War II and the postwar era as Roswell Army Air Field (RAAF). During the early years of the Cold War, it became the largest base of the Strategic Air Command. It is also known for the Roswell UFO incident, an event that occurred on 4 July 1947. It is alleged that a "flying disc" crashed during a severe thunderstorm near the base at Corona, New Mexico.

Walker AFB was named after General Kenneth Newton Walker, a native of Los Cerrillos, New Mexico, who was killed during a bombing mission over Rabaul, New Britain, Papua New Guinea, on 5 January 1943. His group scored direct hits on nine Japanese ships before being intercepted by enemy fighters. Walker was last seen leaving the target area with one engine on fire and several fighters on his tail, and he was awarded the Medal of Honor posthumously by President Franklin D. Roosevelt in 1943. The base was renamed in his honor on 13 January 1948. Funding cutbacks during the Vietnam War led to the closure of the base in 1967. It was subsequently converted into a civil airport and renamed Roswell International Air Center.

== History ==
What became Roswell Army Air Field was acquired by the United States Army Air Forces in 1941 from rancher David Chesser for the purpose of establishing a Military Flying Training Center and Bombardier School. From the beginning, it was designed as a large, expansive facility, given the excellent flying weather in New Mexico. The airfield consisted of seven concrete runways, two parallel North/South 7329x200 and 7000x200; two parallel NE/SW 7200x200 and 5655x200; two parallel NW/SE, 6964x200 and 5900x200 and one E/W runway 6884x200 (E/W).

In addition, no less than nine auxiliary landing fields for overflow and touch/go landing/takeoffs were established in the area. Enough construction was completed for the base and airfield to be activated and assigned to the United States Army Air Corps Training Command on 20 September 1941.

=== World War II ===
The Roswell Army Flying School was activated on 20 September 1941. Its mission was the training of third-phase aviation cadets in twin-engine aircraft. The school operated Beechcraft AT-11 Kansan twin-engine trainers and four (548th, 549th, 550th and 551st) Two-Engine Flying Training Squadrons. In addition to the flying school the Bombardier's school, operated 3 training squadrons also flying the AT-11.

In 1943, three additional twin engine flying training squadrons were added and two additional squadrons were added to the Bombardiers school as additional runways became available. Over 300 trainers filled the large parking ramp, which included Vultee BT-13 and BT-15 Valiant single engine trainers and Cessna AT-17 twin-engine trainers.

Until the fall of 1944, Second Air Force provided all Boeing B-29 Superfortress transition training for the Army Air Forces. Then, on 12 September 1944, HQ AAF directed Training Command to establish B-29 schools for the transition of crews consisting of pilots, copilots, and flight engineers. Initially, there were few B-29s available for Training Command to conduct training. However, by January 1945 Roswell AAF had transitioned and the 3030th AAF Base Unit (Pilot School, Specialized Very Heavy) which specialized in B-29 Superfortress 4 engine pilot transition and bombardier training was activated.

Although there was a bombing target adjacent to the runway, the only items dropped from an aircraft were bags of sand or flour. The practice bombing and gunnery ranges were due south of the air field and on Matagorda Island along the Texas Gulf coast.

In addition to the airfield, the Roswell Prisoners of War (POW) camp was built for up to 4,800 POWs. Most of the POWs housed at the camp were German and Italian soldiers captured during the North African campaign. The POWs were actually used as construction laborers on local projects and many of Roswell's parks were built by POWs. The Spring River, which passes through downtown Roswell, was lined with concrete and stones using POW labor. The prisoners used stones of different colors to form an Iron Cross in the riverbed.

With the end of World War II, the training mission at Roswell AAF ended on 1 November 1945. The base was designated as a permanent Army Air Force facility and jurisdiction of the base was transferred to 238th Army Air Forces Base Unit, Second Air Force, Continental Air Command.

=== Strategic Air Command ===
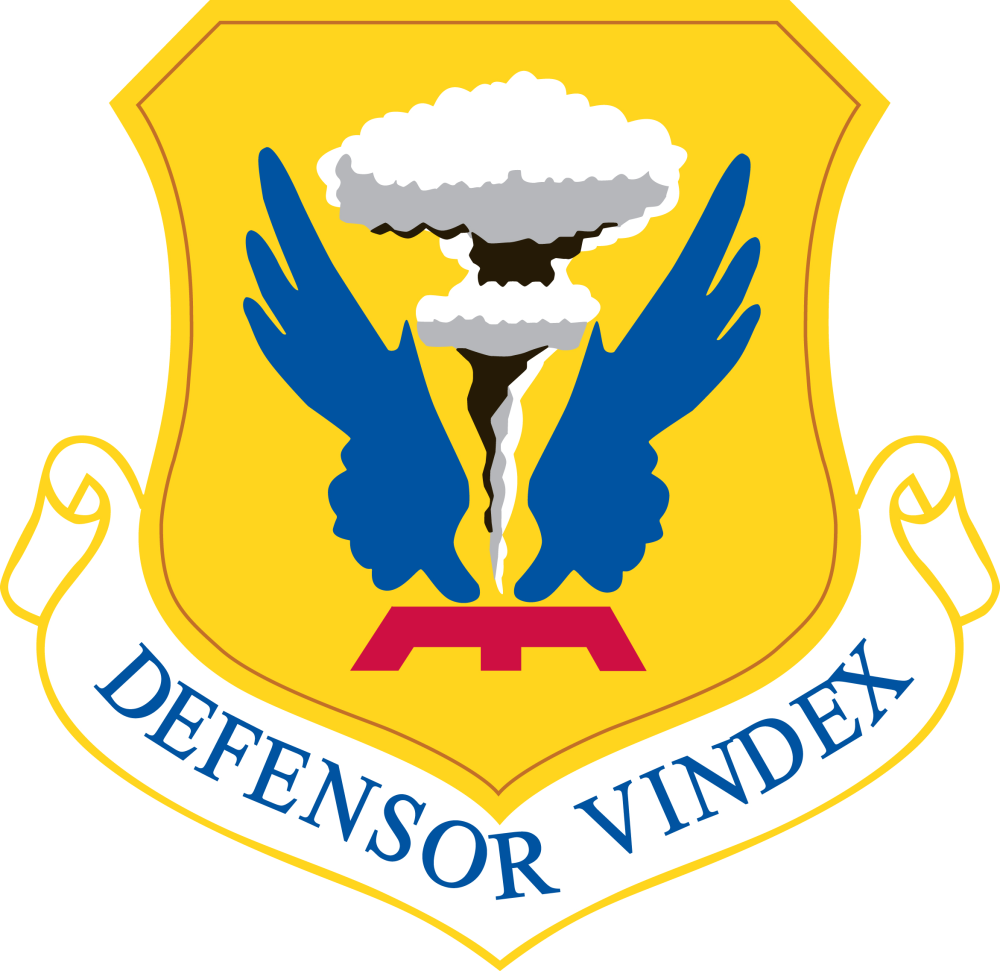
Emblem of the 509th Bombardment Wing

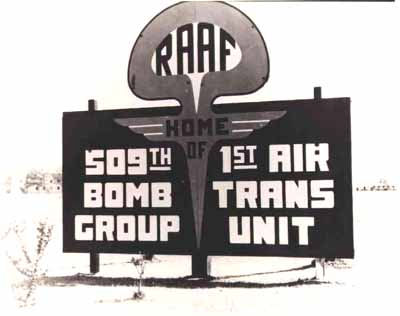
1946/47 sign at Roswell Army Airfield. Note the Mushroom Cloud symbol for the 509th Bomb Group.

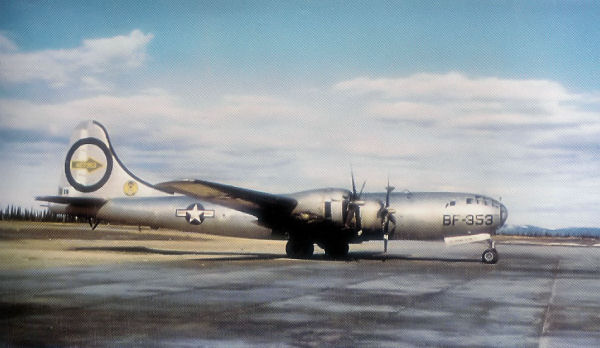
Martin-Omaha B-29-40-MO Superfortress AAF Serial No. 44-27353 The Great Artiste assigned to Crew C-15, 393rd Bombardment Squadron of the 509th Bomb Group. This aircraft was converted to Silverplate Victor number 89. This aircraft flew on both Atomic Bomb missions (6 August, 9 August 1945) as an instrument aircraft monitoring the nuclear explosions.

The 509th Composite Group returned from its wartime base on Tinian and relocated to Roswell on 6 November 1945, initially being assigned to Second Air Force under Continental Air Forces. With demobilization in full swing in late 1945, much juggling of units was being performed by the Army Air Forces. It was reassigned to the 58th Bombardment Wing at Fort Worth Army Airfield on 17 January 1946. The 509th was assigned to Strategic Air Command on 21 March 1946, being one of the first eleven organizations assigned to SAC.

In April 1946 many of the group's Boeing B-29 Superfortress aircraft deployed to Kwajalein as part of Operation Crossroads, a series of atomic bomb tests. The remainder became the core of two new squadrons activated as part of the group, the 715th Bomb Squadron and the 830th Bomb Squadron. In May 1946, the Army Air Forces gave the newly formed SAC the responsibility of delivering the atomic bomb. Only the 509th was trained and ready for the atomic bomb mission.

Squadrons assigned to the 509th were:

- 393d Bombardment Squadron
- 715th Bombardment Squadron
- 830th Bombardment Squadron

On 10 July 1946, the group was renamed the 509th Bombardment Group (Very Heavy). With the creation of the United States Air Force as a separate service, the group became the combat component of the 509th Bombardment Wing on 17 November 1947, although it was not operational until 14 September 1948, when Colonel John D. Ryan was named commander.

The wing pioneered a new concept on 30 June 1948, when the 509th Air Refueling Squadron was activated as part of the 509th BW, along with the 43rd ARS at Davis-Monthan AFB, Arizona, the first such units ever created. With the addition of KB-29M tankers, the 509th's bombers could reach virtually any point on Earth. In June 1950, it began receiving the upgraded version of the B-29, the Boeing B-50A Superfortress. When the huge Convair B-36 Peacemaker joined the Air Force inventory, the "Very Heavy" designation was dropped. The 509th – like all other B-29 and B-50 wings – was redesignated "Medium".

In January 1954, the Boeing KC-97 aerial tanker replaced the aging KB-29Ms, and the wing entered the jet age in June 1955 when it received the first all-jet bomber: the Boeing B-47 Stratojet. On 16 June 1958 the 509th Bombardment Wing was transferred to Pease AFB, New Hampshire.

The 468th Bombardment Group arrived at Roswell on 12 January 1946 from West Field, Tinian. At Roswell the group exchanged aircraft and equipment with the 509th, with the lowest-hour and most reliable B-29 aircraft being transferred then being sent to Carswell Air Force Base, Texas for modification to Silverplate (Atomic Bomb-Capable) specifications. The balance of the aircraft were sent to storage at Davis-Monthan AFB Arizona or Pyote Army Airfield Texas. The group was inactivated on 31 March 1946.

==== 33rd Fighter Group ====
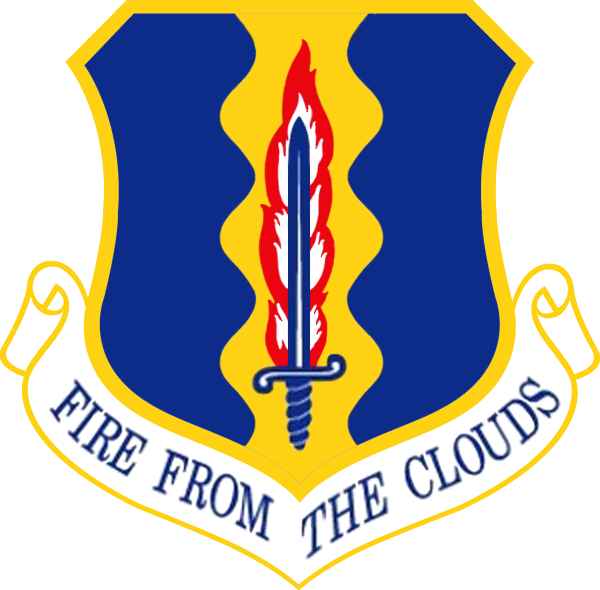
Emblem of the 33d Fighter Group

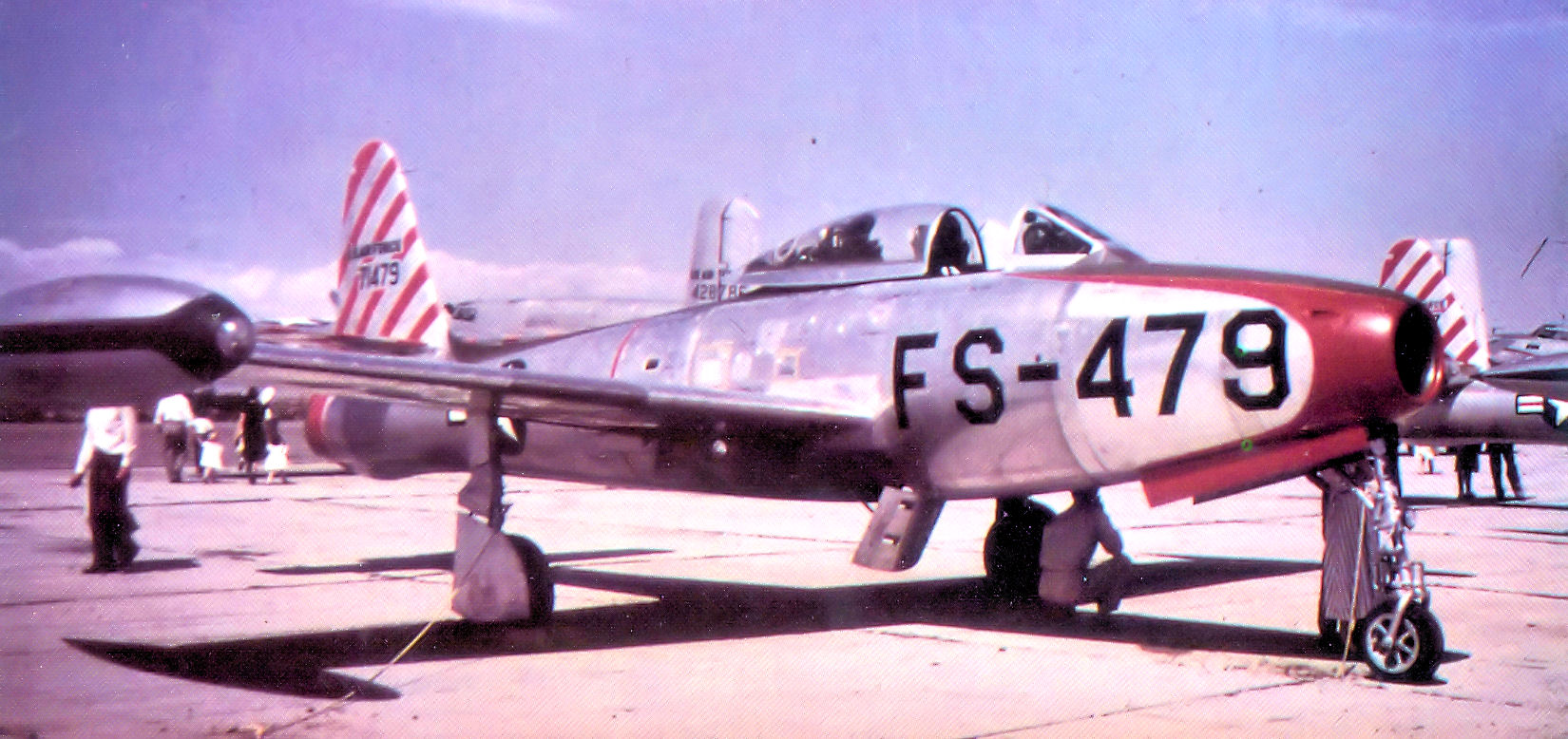
Republic P/F-84C-6-RE Thunderjet AF Serial No. 47-1479 of the 33d Fighter Wing – 1948

The 33rd Fighter Group was assigned to Roswell on 25 August 1947, being transferred from Bad Kissingen AB, West Germany after a year of occupation duty. Squadrons of the 33rd at Roswell were:

- 59th Fighter Squadron (F-51, F-84)
- 60th Fighter Squadron (F-51, F-84)

The group was initially attached to the 509th Bombardment Group to perform fighter escort duties. The group was redesignated as the 33rd Fighter Wing on 15 October 1947. It remained at Roswell until 16 November 1948 when it was transferred to Otis Air Force Base, Massachusetts.

==== 6th Bombardment Wing ====
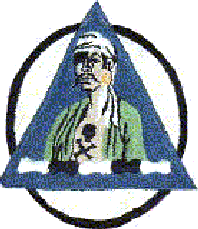
Patch used by the 6th Bombardment Wing

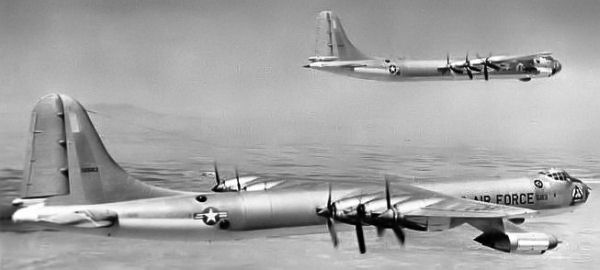
Convair B-36F-5-CF (III) Peacemakers of the 6th Bomb Wing. B-36F AF Ser. No. 49-2683 is in foreground. Each aircraft had a crew of 15 men, sixteen 20mm cannons in eight turrets, and carried a 43,500 lb. MK-17 Thermonuclear Weapon during EWO (Emergency War Order) operations.

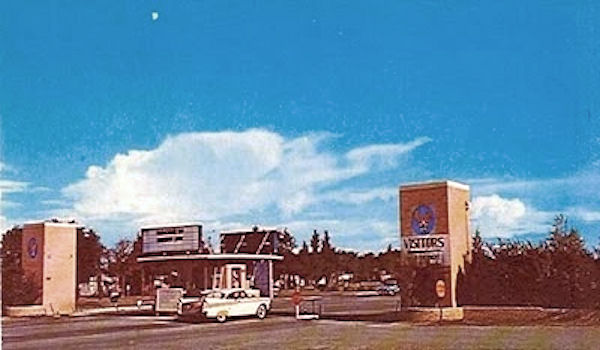
Walker Front Gate, about 1960

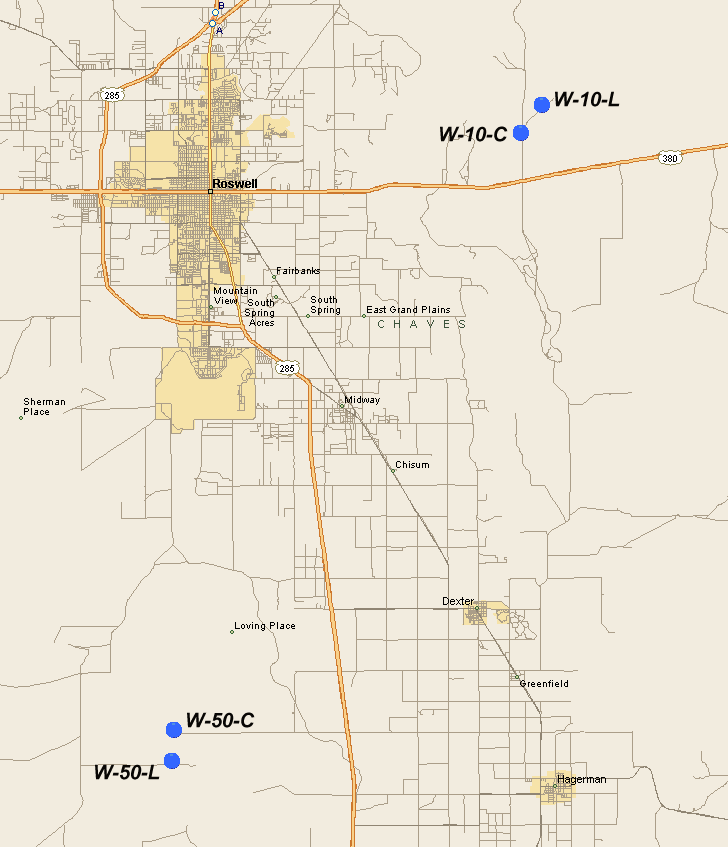
Walker AFB Nike missile Defense Area

The 6th Bombardment Wing, Medium was activated on 2 January 1951 at Walker AFB and was equipped with Boeing B-29 Superfortress. On 1 August 1951, the 307th Air Refueling Squadron was attached to the wing. It flew KB-29 tankers until inactivated 16 June 1952. The 6th, along with the 509th Bombardment Wing at Walker formed the SAC 47th Air Division until June 1958 with the reassignment of the 509th to Pease AFB.

However the three squadrons of the wing (24th, 39th, 40th) were soon re-equipped with SAC's new heavy bomber, Convair B-36D Peacemaker and the unit was redesignated the 6th Bombardment Wing (Heavy).

The B-36D was the first major production model of the bomber, being equipped with two pairs of General Electric J47-GE-19 turbojets in pods underneath the outer wings to assist the six R-4360-41 piston engines. The B-36D flew fairly well on just four or even three piston engines, so it was common practice to shut down some of the engines during cruise. The turbojets were normally used only for speed dashes over the target area or for takeoff. The 6th conducted strategic bombardment training with the aircraft, being deployed at Andersen AFB, Guam from October 1955 to January 1956.

The phaseout of the B-36 began in 1957, when the wing began receiving the new Boeing B-52 Stratofortress jet bomber. They were flown by its existing squadrons. The last of the B-36s departed Walker in 1958.

To provide air defense of the base, United States Army Nike Hercules Surface-to-air missile sites were constructed during 1959 near Roswell (W-10) 33°26′10″N 104°20′06″W and Hagerman (W-50) 33°07′35″N 104°32′38″W, New Mexico. The sites were selected and built, the battalion activated, batteries were assigned, and then the whole setup was shut down. Many of the personnel were later transferred to Omaha, Nebraska for the protection of Offutt AFB.

In September 1959, the 24th and 30th Bombardment Squadrons joined the newly assigned 4129th Combat Crew Training Squadron to train B-52 and KC-135 crews. The 40th Bombardment Squadron continued flying operational missions until 10 June 1960. From 10 June 1960 to 1 December 1961 the wing flew a few operational missions in a non-combat ready status. The 40th Squadron returned to operational status on 1 December 1961. The other two bomb squadrons regained tactical status on 5 September 1963. The 39th Squadron discontinued a few days later, but the 24th and 40th continued global bombardment training through December 1966, when they phased down for inactivation.

The 6th Air Refueling Squadron, flying early-model KC-135A aircraft, was assigned to Walker AFB from 3 January 1958. On 3 February 1960, a "short-tail" (non-hydraulic-power-assisted rudder) KC-135A crashed during takeoff in strong and gusty crosswinds. The pilot failed to maintain directional control, rotated the aircraft 5–10 knots too early and the aircraft settled onto the dirt apron of the runway, shed two engines, plowed through the aircraft parking area and came to rest in an aircraft hangar. This single crash resulted in the destruction of three KC-135 aircraft and the deaths of eight military personnel.

The wing was redesignated the 6th Strategic Aerospace Wing on 1 May 1962. On 25 June 1965, the 310th Air Refueling Squadron was attached to the wing. It flew KC-135A aircraft until the base was closed and the unit was moved to Plattsburgh AFB, NY on 25 January 1967.

==== 579th Strategic Missile Squadron ====
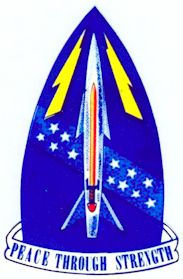
Emblem of the 579th Strategic Missile Squadron

In 1960, Atlas missile silos were constructed around the Roswell area. Reportedly, the first Atlas missile to arrive in Roswell received a welcoming parade. On 2 January 1961, the 579th Strategic Missile Squadron was activated as part of the 6 BW at Walker. New Mexico's Governor Edwin L. Mechem gave the keynote speech at a Site 10 ceremony held on 31 October 1961, in which the first missile site was turned over to the Air Force.

Although Chaves County residents took patriotic pride in the news of the missile squadron's arrival, Roswell residents submitted 10 permit requests for bomb shelters in October 1961 as construction went ahead.

The 579th SMS received its first missile on 24 January 1962. In April 1962, a completed liquid oxygen plant built at Walker AFB was turned over to the Air Force. The squadron completed missile installation approximately one month before the Cuban Missile Crisis.

Roswell's sites developed a notorious reputation due to three missile explosions. On 1 June 1963, launch complex 579-1 was destroyed during a propellant loading exercise. On 13 February 1964 an explosion occurred during another propellant loading exercise, destroying launch complex 579-5. Again, a month later, on 9 March 1964, silo 579-2 fell victim to another explosion that occurred during a propellant loading exercise.

These missiles were not mated with their warheads at the time of the incidents. The only injury reported was that of a crewman running into barbed wire as he fled a site.

The accidents at Walker and at other Atlas and Titan I sites accelerated the decision to inactivate these systems. On 25 March 1965 the 579 SMS was inactivated and the Air Force removed the missiles from their silos. After being demilitarized, the former missile sites reverted to private ownership.

==== 686th Aircraft Control and Warning Squadron ====
Walker AFB was selected to be part of the planned deployment by Air Defense Command of forty-four mobile radar stations across the United States to support the permanent Radar network established during the Cold War for air defense of the United States. This deployment had been projected to be operational by mid-1952. Funding, constant site changes, construction, and equipment delivery delayed deployment.

A temporary radar site (L-46) was activated at Walker AFB in 1950 to protect the approaches. L-46 was located in an old government housing building, with a complement of less than 100 personnel of the 120th Aircraft Control and Warning Squadron. The 120th AC&W Squadron consisted of members of the federalized Arkansas Air National Guard, called to active duty during the Korean War. The station functioned as a Ground-Control Intercept (GCI) and warning station. As a GCI station, the squadron's role was to guide interceptor aircraft toward unidentified intruders picked up on the unit's radar scopes.

Designated to receive a new radar as part of the mobile radar program, this radar site continued to be operational on a Lashup basis in late 1952 using an AN/TPS-1B radar. A more permanent facility at Walker was operational, with the 686th Aircraft Control and Warning Squadron activated on 1 October 1953, replacing the federalized ANG unit which was inactivated. The squadron consisted of about 150 Officers and Airmen.

The 686th AC&W Squadron operated AN/MPS-7 search and AN/MPS-14 height-finder radars.

In addition to the main facility, Walker operated several AN/FPS-14 Gap Filler sites:

- Santa Rosa, NM (M-90B): 34°51′40″N 104°45′25″W
- Sierra Blanca, TX (M-90E): 31°41′53″N 105°22′57″W

In March 1963 the Air Force ordered the site to shut down. Operations ceased 1 August 1963. Today the cantonment area is still extant, now used by the physical plant crew of the Eastern New Mexico University – Roswell (ENMU-R). The radar site at Walker is decrepit and abandoned, with refuse around buildings and the concrete road badly cracked and deteriorated.

=== Closure ===
In 1967, the Air Force announced that Walker AFB would be closed. This was during a round of stateside base closings and consolidations as the Defense Department struggled to pay the expenses of the Vietnam War within the budgetary limits set by Congress. The 6th BW became the 6th Strategic Wing and was relocated to Eielson AFB, Alaska.

Walker AFB was officially closed on 30 June 1967. It has since been redeveloped by civil authorities into the Roswell International Air Center. Large numbers of out-of-service aircraft are stored on the parking ramps and disused taxiways/runways for refurbishment and sale. In addition, the Boeing Company uses RIAC for braking performance testing of its aircraft, most recent was the testing of the BF Goodrich carbon brakes on the 737-900ER model. Also testing on brakes was performed on the new Boeing 787 Dreamliner.

The Eastern New Mexico University has built a large campus on the west side of the former base, however much of the base still has the look and feel of the former Air Force Base. Many former Air Force buildings, including aircraft hangars, maintenance shops, barracks, and office buildings have been reused for private interests. The large housing area still exists, with the former government housing units in private hands. Large numbers of buildings have also been removed or torn down, leaving large areas of vacant land with streets and former parking lots and concrete foundations.

In 2005, the base was used for a secret Foo Fighters concert celebrating the band's tenth anniversary.

=== Previous names ===
- Roswell Army Flying School, 1941–1942
- Roswell Army Air Field (RAAF), 1942–1947
- Roswell Air Force Base, 1947–1948
- Walker Air Force Base, 1948–1967

=== Major commands to which assigned ===
- West Coast Air Corps Training Center, 1941–1943
- Western Flying Training Command, 1943–1945
- Second Air Force, 1945–1946
- Strategic Air Command, 1946–1967

=== Major units assigned ===
- Roswell Army Flying School, 1941–1945
- 3030th AAF Base Unit, 1944-1945
- 509th Bombardment Group (Wing), 1945–1958
- 468th Bombardment Group, 1946
- 33d Fighter Group (Wing), 1947–1948
- 6th Bombardment (later Strategic Aerospace) Wing, 1951–1967
- 47th Air Division, 1951–1958
- 58th Fighter-Interceptor Squadron (ADC), 1959–1960
- 22d Air Division, 1963–1965
- 579th Strategic Missile Squadron, 1961–1965

=== SM-65F Atlas Missile Sites ===
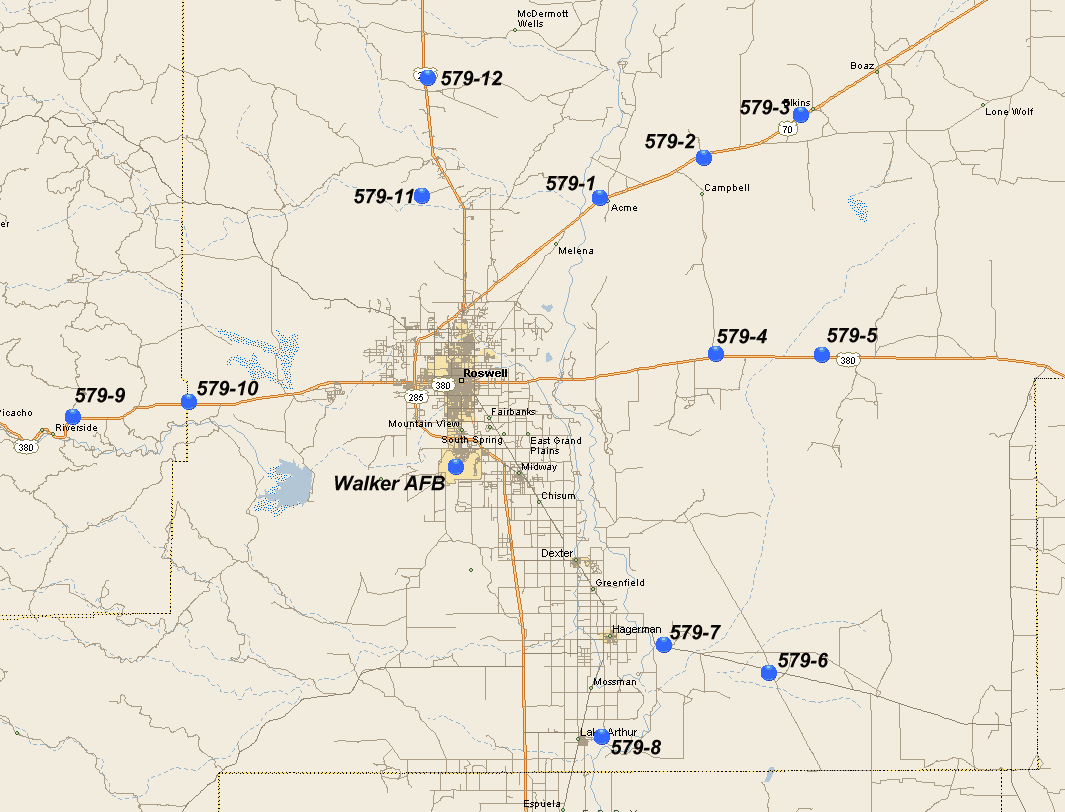
SM-65F Atlas Missile Sites

The 579th Strategic Missile Squadron operated twelve missile sites, of one missile at each site.

- 579-1 (1962–1963)*, 0.8 mi NW of Acme, NM 33°35′52″N 104°20′27″W
- 579-2 (1962–1964)*, 8.1 mi ENE of Acme, NM 33°38′27″N 104°12′10″W
- 579-3, 16.1 mi ENE of Acme, NM 33°41′17″N 104°04′29″W
- 579-4, 12.7 mi ENE of Rio Hondo, NM 33°25′31″N 104°11′17″W
- 579-5 (1962–1964)*, 20.0 mi SE of Acme, NM 33°25′24″N 104°02′54″W
- 579-6, 12.4 mi ESE of Hagerman, NM 33°04′24″N 104°07′12″W
- 579-7, 4.2 mi E of Hagerman, NM 33°06′16″N 104°15′29″W
- 579-8, 7.3 mi S of Hagerman, NM 33°00′15″N 104°20′22″W
- 579-9, 2.5 mi ENE of Sunset, NM 33°21′17″N 105°02′07″W
- 579-10, 11.2 mi E of Sunset, NM 33°22′21″N 104°52′59″W
- 579-11, 6.2 mi W of Arroyo Macho del, NM 33°35′58″N 104°34′33″W
- 579-12, 16.7 mi NW of Acme, NM 33°43′47″N 104°34′05″W

* Missile explosion destroyed site

== See also ==
- Ivor Parry Evans
- Roswell International Air Center
- New Mexico World War II Army Airfields
- 38th Flying Training Wing (World War II)
- Central Air Defense Force (Air Defense Command) (34th Air Division)
