= 320th Troop Carrier Squadron =

320th Troop Carrier Squadron (later 302nd Tactical Electronic Warfare Squadron)
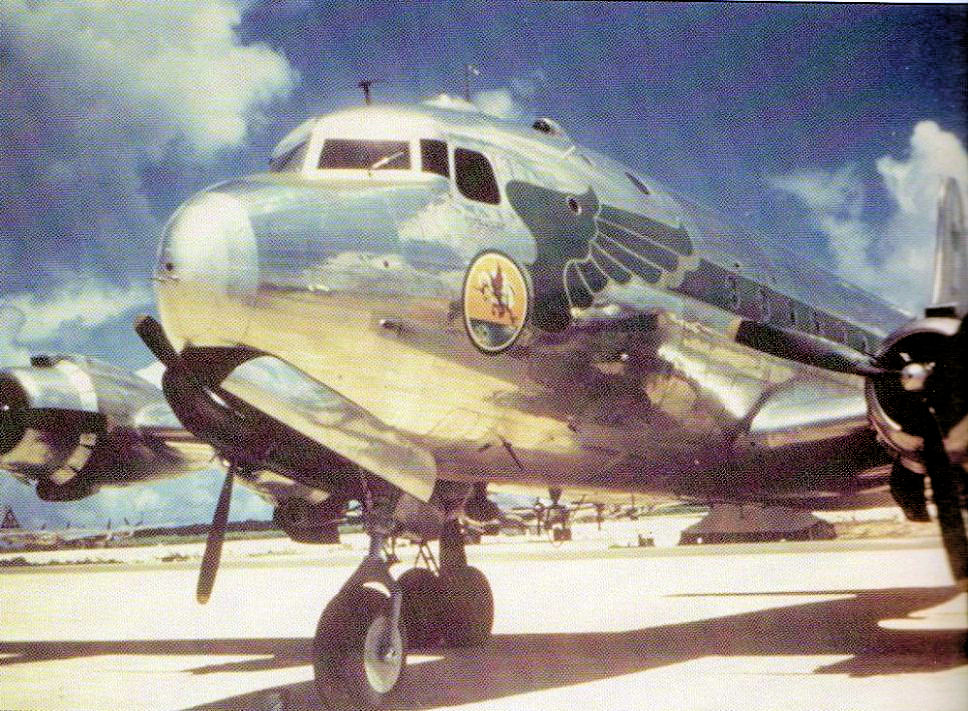
- C-54 Skymaster of the 320th Troop Carrier Squadron, likely taken at North Field, Tinian in 1945
- Country: United States
- Branch: United States Air Force
- Role: Transport
- Part of: 509th Composite Group
- Engagements: World War II Asiatic-Pacific Streamer

Commanders
- Notable commanders: Major Charles W. Sweeney

Insignia
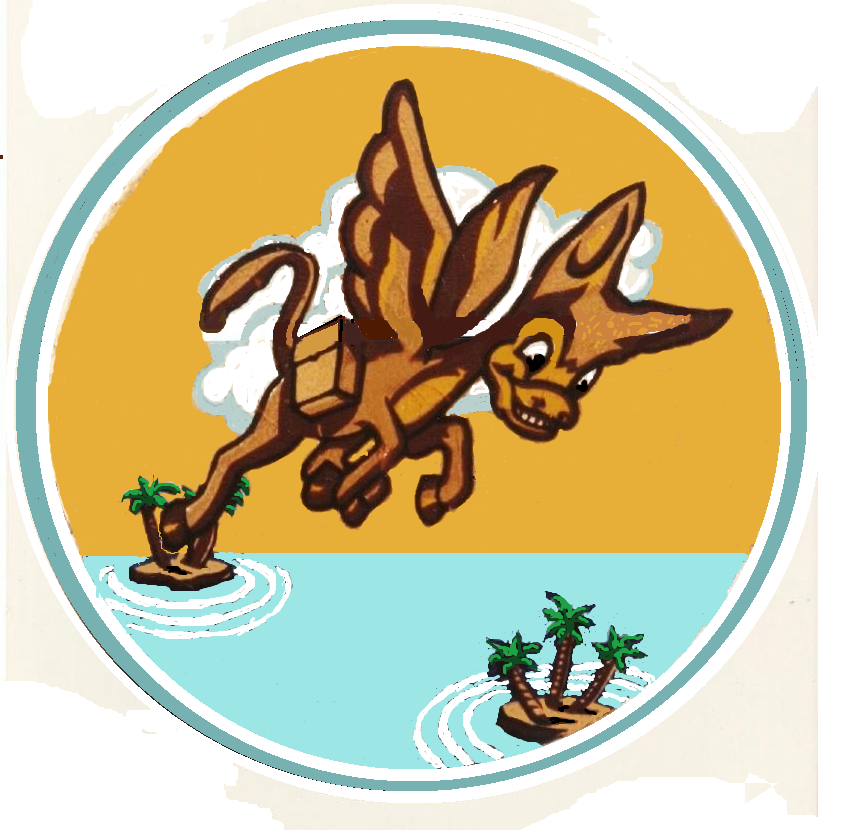
- 320th Troop Carrier Squadron emblem (Note: Approved 27 June 1945)

The 320th Troop Carrier Squadron is an inactive United States Air Force unit. It was activated on 17 December 1944, and inactivated on 19 August 1946 at Roswell Army Air Field, New Mexico. The squadron was later consolidated with the 302d Transport Squadron and 302d Tactical Reconnaissance Squadron. The squadron was a support squadron for the 509th Composite Group during World War II. It was formed as the transport unit for the 509th, and due to the highly secret nature of the group, carried all supplies and equipment for Project Silverplate Atomic Bomb activities. It also functioned as a special air transport squadron for high-ranking officers, nuclear scientists and for the group's commander, Lt. Col. Paul Tibbets to meetings concerning Silverplate. The squadron later served as a transport squadron for atomic tests in the Marshall Islands in 1946.

== History ==
=== Organization ===
The squadron was organized at Wendover Field, Utah on 17 December 1944 under the temporary command of Major Hubert J. Konopacki. However, before its official organization, its parent 509th Composite Group had operated a transport flight of Douglas C-47 Skytrains, carrying freight and other personnel in connection with the Silverplate Atomic Bomb project.

On 6 January 1945, Major Charles W. Sweeney was placed in command of the squadron. Lt. Col. Paul Tibbets, Commander of the 509th arranged using his Silverplate priority to supplement the C-47s with larger, 4-engine Douglas C-54 Skymasters normally assigned to Air Transport Command (ATC). Over the next several months, frequent flights were made in support of the 509th and its training at Wendover. This included flying to bases in the United States and the Caribbean. Batista Field, Cuba was a training area for the 509th to practice long-distance cross-country flying and the 320th would fly there carrying personnel and specialized equipment as part of the squadron training.

=== Operations on Tinian ===
In early 1945, the massive American base being constructed at North Field, Tinian, was selected to be the operational base for the 509th. Subsequently many of the group's pilots flew to Tinian on ATC planes to familiarize themselves with the routes to be flown by the units Boeing B-29 Superfortresses and C-54s. The short-legged C-47s would remain at Wendover.

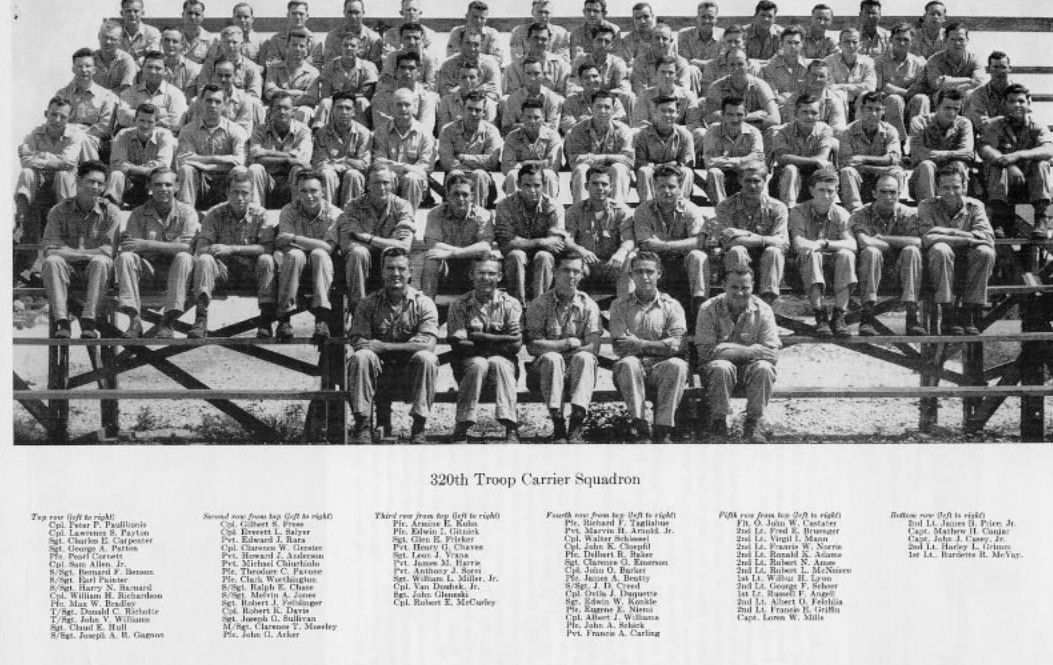
Group photo of squadron members, North Field, Tinian, 1945

All through April 1945, the group's ground echelon was processed for overseas deployment. On 26 April, a troop train departed with 40 enlisted men and 2 officers, arriving at the Seattle, Washington Port of Embarkation on the 28th. The ground echelon gathered in Seattle and deployed on 6 May aboard the SS Cape Victory. At Wendover, Major Sweeney was transferred to be the commander of the 393d Bombardment Squadron and he was replaced by Captain John J. Casey, Jr.

In May 1945 the squadron moved to North Field, Tinian, transporting men and materiel of the 509th group as the group moved to its operational base. For the reason that freight took priority over passengers, the rear air element of the 320th remained at Wendover, and flew the squadron's C-47s to ferry necessary equipment to the base, which would be transshipped to Tinian on the C-54s. Meanwhile on Tinian, the flying crews of the 320th were making continual round-trip flights to and from the States, as well as flights to Okinawa and Iwo Jima, carrying civilian technicians and their equipment. Five C-54s made the deployment to Tinian, and the planes were indispensable in the perpetration of the 509th for its combat missions.

After the 393d Bombardment Squadron's two atomic bomb combat missions to Hiroshima and Nagasaki Japan in early August, the 320th on Tinian was engaged in carrying military and civilian experts to Japan after its subsequent surrender.

=== Operation Crossroads ===
Finally in November with the mission on Tinian completed, the squadron moved to Roswell Army Air Field, New Mexico in the fall of 1945. Although it remained active, demobilization resulted in the loss of almost all squadron personnel. The unit was, however, manned and equipped to enable it to participate in atomic testing.

During Operation Crossroads the squadron operated as Air Transport Unit 1.54 (Provisional). Prior to the weapons drop, it transported personnel and material (including radiological test samples) to support the testing. When special observation aircraft failed to arrive in the Kwajalein Atoll test area seven days before the test, the squadron substituted for them. On the first and second day after testing, the 320th flew scientists and high-ranking personnel on low-level observation flights over the test area.

=== Inactivation ===
The 320th Troop Carrier Squadron was inactivated on 19 August 1946. The mission, however remained and its equipment and personnel were transferred to the 1st Air Transport Unit, which was organized on 10 July at Roswell. Assigned to Fifteenth Air Force, the 1st continued the mission of the inactivated 320th.

The squadron was consolidated with the 302nd Transport Squadron and the 302nd Tactical Reconnaissance Squadron as the 302nd Tactical Electronic Warfare Training Squadron on 19 September 1985

== Lineage ==
- Constituted as the 320th Troop Carrier Squadron on 9 December 1944

Activated on 17 December 1944
Inactivated on 19 August 1946

- Consolidated with the 302nd Transport Squadron and the 302d Tactical Reconnaissance Squadron as the 302d Tactical Electronic Warfare Squadron on 19 September 1985

=== Assignments ===
- 509th Composite Group, 17 December 1944 – 19 August 1946

=== Stations ===
- Wendover Field, Utah, 17 December 1944 – 26 April 1945
- North Field, Tinian, 30 May – 17 October 1945
- Roswell Army Air Field, New Mexico, 6 November 1945 – 19 August 1946

=== Aircraft ===
- Douglas C-47 Skytrain, 1944-1946
- Douglas C-54 Skymaster, 1945-1946
