= Laurence G. Hanscom =

American journalist and aviator

- Born: Laurence Gerald Hanscom; August 20, 1906
- Died: February 9, 1941 (aged 34); Saugus, Massachusetts
- Known for: Founding the Massachusetts Wing of the Civilian Aviation Reserve
- Aviation career
- Air force: Civilian Aviation Reserve, Massachusetts Wing
- Rank: Commander

Laurence Gerald Hanscom (August 20, 1906 – February 9, 1941) was an American journalist and aviator and the namesake of Hanscom Air Force Base and Hanscom Field.

== Early life ==
Hanscom was born on August 20, 1906. He attended public schools in Malden and Wilmington, Massachusetts and graduated from Wilmington High School in 1923.

== Journalism ==
Hanscom wrote for the school newspaper while a student at Malden and Wilmington High Schools. In the spring of 1923 he began assisting The Boston Daily Globe's correspondent in Woburn, Massachusetts. He later joined the Globe as an office boy. He moved up to a position as a clerk, working in the library and the editorial department. He later became a staff reporter and was eventually assigned to the State House. In 1937 he joined the Telegram & Gazette as a State House correspondent.

== Aviation ==
Hanscom began flying in 1929. In 1937 year he was appointed by Massachusetts Governor Charles F. Hurley to serve on a Special Commission on Aviation and Planning, Development and Location of Airports. The commission recommended the creation of six new state airports, including two adjacent to Route 128 in metropolitan Boston. In 1941, the state legislature passed legislation for such an airport by approving funds for an airport in Bedford, Massachusetts.

In January 1940, Hanscom and Elmer S. Orr, an electrical engineer who flew with the Royal Air Force in World War I, founded the Massachusetts Wing of the Civilian Aviation Reserve. That August he was named the wing's first commander. By 1941 the group numbered about 150 pilots and 300 others. In February 1941, Hanscom confided to friends and family that he was considering entering the Royal Canadian Air Force as an instructor.

== Death ==
On February 9, 1941, Hanscom and a passenger departed from Muller Field in Revere, Massachusetts in a single-motor biplane with dual controls for training. His plane was observed making three loops over Saugus, Massachusetts. While attempting a fourth loop, the plane went into a spin and landed among three trees in the backyard of 8 Springdale Ave. in Saugus, missing the house by five or ten yards. The area where the crash occurred was 50 yards (46 m) from a marshland extensively used by pilots to perform stunts. Frederick B. Willis, who lived next door, was first to find the wreck, and his wife notified the police and fire departments. Both men were found dead in the plane.

== Legacy ==
On February 11, 1943 the Boston auxiliary airport at Bedford was officially dedicated as Laurence G. Hanscom Field. In June 1947, the Commonwealth of Massachusetts and the United States Army entered a joint use agreement which eventually led to the creation of the Hanscom Air Force Base.
