= 7th Reconnaissance Squadron =

7th Reconnaissance Squadron may refer to:

- The 397th Bombardment Squadron, designated the 7th Reconnaissance Squadron from September 1937 to December 1939, 7th Reconnaissance Squadron (Medium Range) from December 1939 to November 1940, and 7th Reconnaissance Squadron (Heavy) from November 1940 to April 1943
- The 3rd Composite Squadron (consolidated with the 303rd Tactical Reconnaissance Squadron in 1985), designated the 7th Reconnaissance Squadron from June 1943 to September 1943

== See also ==
- 7th Photographic Reconnaissance Squadron
- 7th Tactical Reconnaissance Squadron
