= HAFB =

HAFB may refer to:

- Hamilton Air Force Base, California, United States
- Hanscom Air Force Base, Massachusetts, United States
- Hickam Air Force Base, Hawaii, United States
- Hill Air Force Base, Utah, United States
- Holloman Air Force Base, New Mexico, United States
