= 302nd Tactical Electronic Warfare Training Squadron =

Inactive United States Air Force unit

302d Tactical Electronic Warfare Training Squadron
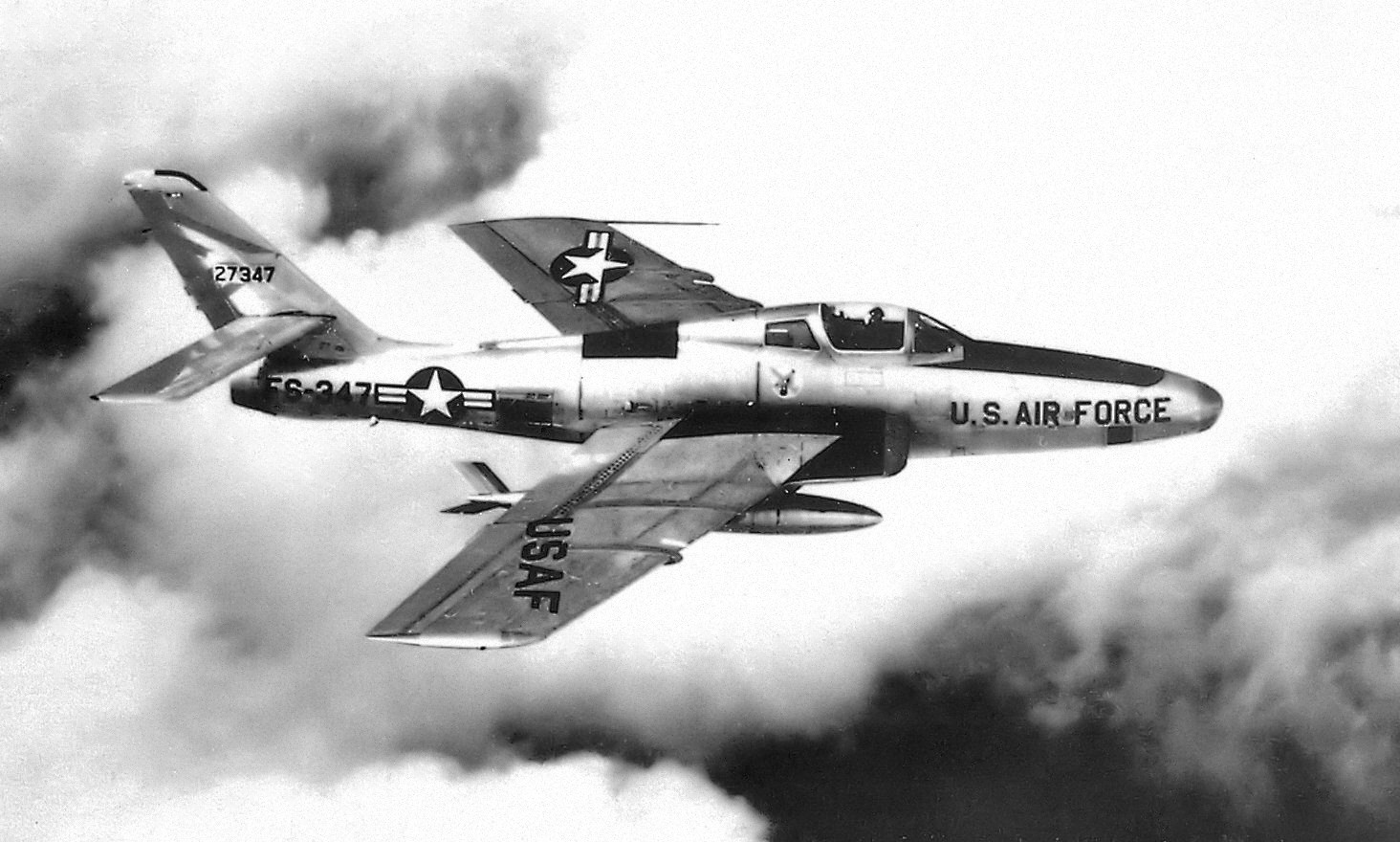
- 302d Tactical Reconnaissance Squadron RF-84F Thunderflash 52-7347
- Active: 1943; 1944–1946; 1953–1959
- Country: United States
- Branch: United States Air Force
- Engagements: China Burma India Theater Pacific Ocean Theater
- Decorations: Air Force Outstanding Unit Award

Insignia
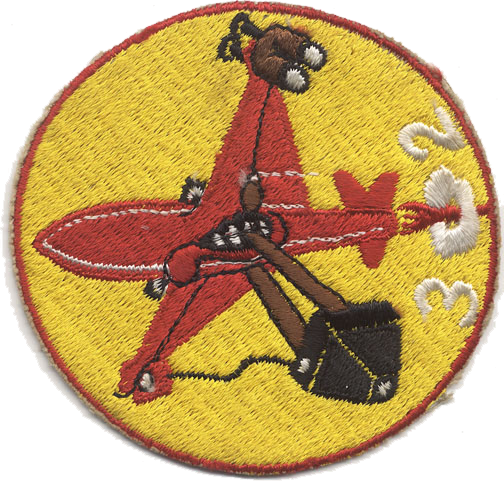
- Patch showing the 302d Tactical Reconnaissance Squadron emblem

The 302d Tactical Electronic Warfare Training Squadron was formed in September 1985 by the consolidation of three units which had served in the Army Air Forces or United States Air Force during World War II and the Cold War.

The 302d Transport Squadron was assigned to the 30th Transport Group and flew missions over the Hump in 1943, until Air Transport Command reorganized its foreign units on a station basis in late 1943.

The 320th Troop Carrier Squadron was assigned to the 509th Composite Group and was tasked with supporting the group's strike squadron, the 393d Bombardment Squadron through the transport of materials, including weapons components, in preparation for the atomic bombings of Hiroshima and Nagasaki. It was inactivated in 1946 after supporting Operation Crossroads.

The 302d Tactical Reconnaissance Squadron was assigned to the 66th Tactical Reconnaissance Wing, After equipping at Shaw Air Force Base, South Carolina it served with United States Air Forces Europe at Sembach Air Base, Germany and at Laon-Couvron Air Base, France. It was inactivated in 1959 and replaced by a unit flying more advanced aircraft.

== History ==
=== Flying the Hump ===
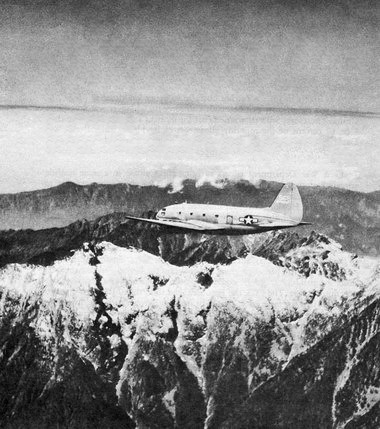
C-46 Commando flying over the Hump

The first squadron that was to form the 302d was the 302d Transport Squadron, which was activated in the summer of 1943 at Mohanbari Airport, India as one of the three squadrons of the 30th Transport Group when the India-China Wing, Air Transport Command expanded by adding three groups. (Note: The 28th, 29th, and 30th Transport Groups) The squadron drew its cadre from the 6th Transport Squadron, (Note: This squadron was formerly the 6th Air Corps Ferry Squadron and is not related to the 6th Transport Squadron that is now the 6th Airlift Squadron) which had been stationed at Mohanbari since March 1942. For the next five months the squadron flew personnel, equipment and supplies from its base in India over the Hump to advanced bases in China.

On 1 December 1943, the India-China Wing, Air Transport Command reorganized, disbanding its table of organization groups and squadrons and replacing them with "Stations" manned under exact manning tables. The squadron, along with the remainder of the 30th group, was replaced by Station 9, India-China Wing, Air Transport Command.

=== Nuclear weapons transport ===
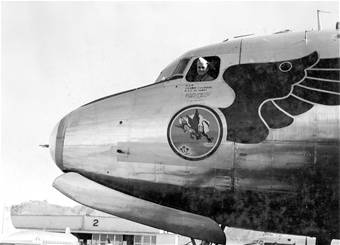
C-54 Skymaster of the 320th Troop Carrier Squadron showing squadron emblem

The second squadron consolidated to form the 302 Tactical Electronic Warfare Training Squadron was the 320th Troop Carrier Squadron, which was activated in late 1944 at Wendover Field, Utah as part of the 509th Composite Group, the first unit to be organized, equipped and trained for atomic warfare. The squadron was initially equipped with both Douglas C-47 Skytrain and Douglas C-54 Skymaster aircraft, but the C-47s were only used in operations in the United States, and when the squadron moved overseas, it was an all C-54 unit. For several months prior to the formal activation of the squadron, its planes had been transporting personnel and equipment for the nuclear weapons project. Squadron aircrew made several flights to Tinian prior to deployment to familiarize themselves with the route prior to supporting the group's move there.

In May 1945 the squadron moved to North Field, Tinian, transporting men and materiel of the 509th group as the group moved to its operational base. Squadron ground personnel deployed by ship, departing from the Seattle Port of Embarkation.In the Pacific, the unit continued to support the 509th as it prepared for the atomic strikes on Japan.

The squadron moved to Roswell Army Air Field, New Mexico in the fall of 1945. Although it remained active, demobilization resulted in the loss of almost all squadron personnel. The unit was, however, manned and equipped to enable it to participate in atomic testing until it was inactivated in August 1946 and replaced by the 1st Air Transport Unit (later the 1st Strategic Support Squadron). During Operation Crossroads the squadron operated as Air Transport Unit 1.54 (Provisional). Prior to the weapons drop, it transported personnel and material (including radiological test samples) to support the testing. When special observation aircraft failed to arrive in the Kwajalein Atoll test area seven days before the test, the squadron substituted for them. On the first and second day after testing, the 320th flew scientists and high ranking personnel on low level observation flights over the test area.

=== Cold War reconnaissance ===
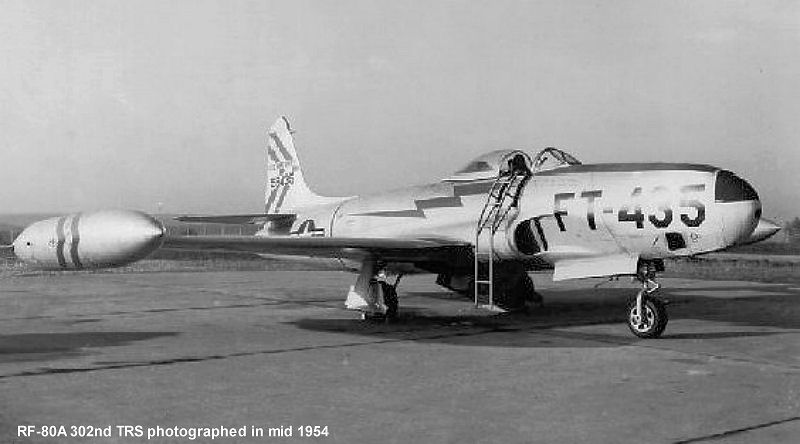
302d Tactical Reconnaissance Squadron RF-80C Shooting Star 45-8435

The third squadron was the 302d Tactical Reconnaissance Squadron, which was activated on 1 January 1953, taking over the mission, personnel and North American RF-51 Mustangs of the 155th Tactical Reconnaissance Squadron, a Tennessee Air National Guard squadron that was returned to state control after having been called to active duty for the Korean War. This reorganization was part of the replacement of the 118th Tactical Reconnaissance Wing by the 66th Tactical Reconnaissance Wing at Shaw Air Force Base, South Carolina. The squadron was re-equipped with Lockheed RF-80A Shooting Star Jet aircraft returned from use in the Korean War in mid-1953. The first RF-80s received (Note: RF-80A-10) had small underwing wing fuel tanks. These planes were replaced by planes (Note: RF-80A-15. This model also had an improved engine and emergency canopy removal system) with 230 gallon capacity tip tanks for longer range.

The squadron deployed to Sembach Air Base, West Germany in mid-1953. The air echelon flew the squadron's aircraft to Europe via the Northern Route, and except for a weather delay at Keflavik Air Base, the movement was successful. The ground echelon sailed on the USS General LeRoy Eltinge (AP-154). In Germany the 302d became part of Twelfth Air Force of United States Air Forces in Europe.

Just three days after arriving at Sembach the 302d was operationally ready and performed photographic mapping missions of the Rhine valley and of Munich. The 302d trained with North Atlantic Treaty Organization forces in Europe during the summer months, however, due to poor weather conditions in central Europe during the winter months, it deployed frequently to Wheelus Air Base, Libya and Nouasseur Air Base (after 1958), Morocco for training. In 1954 the squadron formed an aerobatic team, named the "Bald Iggles" that performed on Armed Forces Day, 21 May 1954. Throughout 1954, however, exercises flown by the 302d indicated that the RF-80 had shortcomings that limited its ability to perform the reconnaissance mission in Europe. Fortunately, the squadron upgraded to the Republic RF-84F Thunderflash in the second half of 1955.

In the summer of 1957, the runway at Sembach began to buckle because of the record heat. This forced the squadron to deploy to Cazeaux in France. At the end of 1957, the 66th Tactical Reconnaissance Group was inactivated in the "Combat Wing" reorganization and the squadron was assigned directly to the 66th Tactical Reconnaissance Wing.

The squadron moved to Laon-Couvron Air Base, France in mid-1958 due to the problems with the Sembach AB runway, which would not be capable of handling the McDonnell RF-101C Voodoos that were expected to replace the RF-84Fs, but operated from Phalsbourg Air Base, where two other squadrons of the 66th wing were located, (Note: The 32d and 38th Tactical Reconnaissance Squadrons) while improvements were made to the Laon runway. In early 1959 it was announced that the two RF-84F equipped squadrons assigned to the 66th wing were to be inactivated and their places taken by the 17th and 18th Tactical Reconnaissance Squadrons, which flew Voodoos and were deployed from Shaw Air Force Base. These new squadrons arrived at Laon in May 1959 and the 302d was inactivated in late June.

== Lineage ==
302d Transport Squadron

- Constituted as the 302d Transport Squadron c. 4 June 1943

Activated on 21 June 1943

- Disbanded on 1 December 1943
- Reconstituted on 19 September 1985 and consolidated with the 320th Troop Carrier Squadron and the 302d Tactical Reconnaissance Squadron as the 302d Tactical Electronic Warfare Training Squadron

320th Troop Carrier Squadron

- Constituted as the 320th Troop Carrier Squadron on 9 December 1944

Activated on 17 December 1944

- Inactivated on 19 August 1946
- Consolidated on 19 September 1985 with the 302d Transport Squadron and the 302d Tactical Reconnaissance Squadron as the 302d Tactical Electronic Warfare Training Squadron

302d Tactical Reconnaissance Squadron

- Constituted as the 302d Tactical Reconnaissance Squadron, Photo-Jet on 15 November 1952

Activated on 1 January 1953
Inactivated on 20 June 1959

- Consolidated on 19 September 1985 with the 302d Transport Squadron and the 320th Troop Carrier Squadron as the 302d Tactical Electronic Warfare Training Squadron
- 302d Tactical Electronic Warfare Training Squadron

Formed by consolidation of the 302d Transport Squadron, 320th Troop Carrier Squadron, and 302d Tactical Reconnaissance Squadron, not active

=== Assignments ===
- 30th Transport Group: 21 July 1943 – 1 December 1943
- 509th Composite Group: 17 December 1944 – 19 August 1946
- 66th Tactical Reconnaissance Group: 1 January 1953
- 66th Tactical Reconnaissance Wing: 8 December 1957 – 20 June 1959

=== Stations ===
- Mohanbari Airfield, India, 21 June 1943 – 1 December 1943
- Wendover Field, Utah, 9 December 1944 – 25 May 1945
- North Field, Tinian, Marianna Islands, 30 May 1945
- Roswell Army Air Field, New Mexico, 17 October 1945 – 19 August 1946
- Shaw Air Force Base, South Carolina, 1 January 1953 – 25 June 1953
- Sembach AB, West Germany, 7 July 1953
- Laon-Couvron Air Base, France, 25 August 1958 – 20 June 1959 (operated from Phalsbourg Air Base until 30 September 1958)

=== Aircraft ===
- Curtiss C-46 Commando, 1943
- Douglas C-47 Skytrain, 1944–1945
- Douglas C-54 Skymaster, 1944–1946
- North American RF-51, 1953
- Lockheed RF-80A Shooting Star, 1953–1955
- Republic RF-84F Thunderflash, 1955–1959

=== Awards and campaigns ===
Award streamer	Award	Dates	Notes
	Air Force Outstanding Unit Award with Combat "V" device	1 July 1945 – 14 August 1945	320th Troop Carrier Squadron
	Air Force Outstanding Unit Award	1 January 1958 – 31 December 1958	302d Tactical Reconnaissance Squadron

Campaign Streamer	Campaign	Dates	Notes
	India-Burma	21 June 1943 – 1 December 1943	302d Transport Squadron
	Asiatic Pacific Theater Streamer without inscription	30 May 1945 – 2 September 1945	320th Troop Carrier Squadron
