= 164th Airlift Wing =

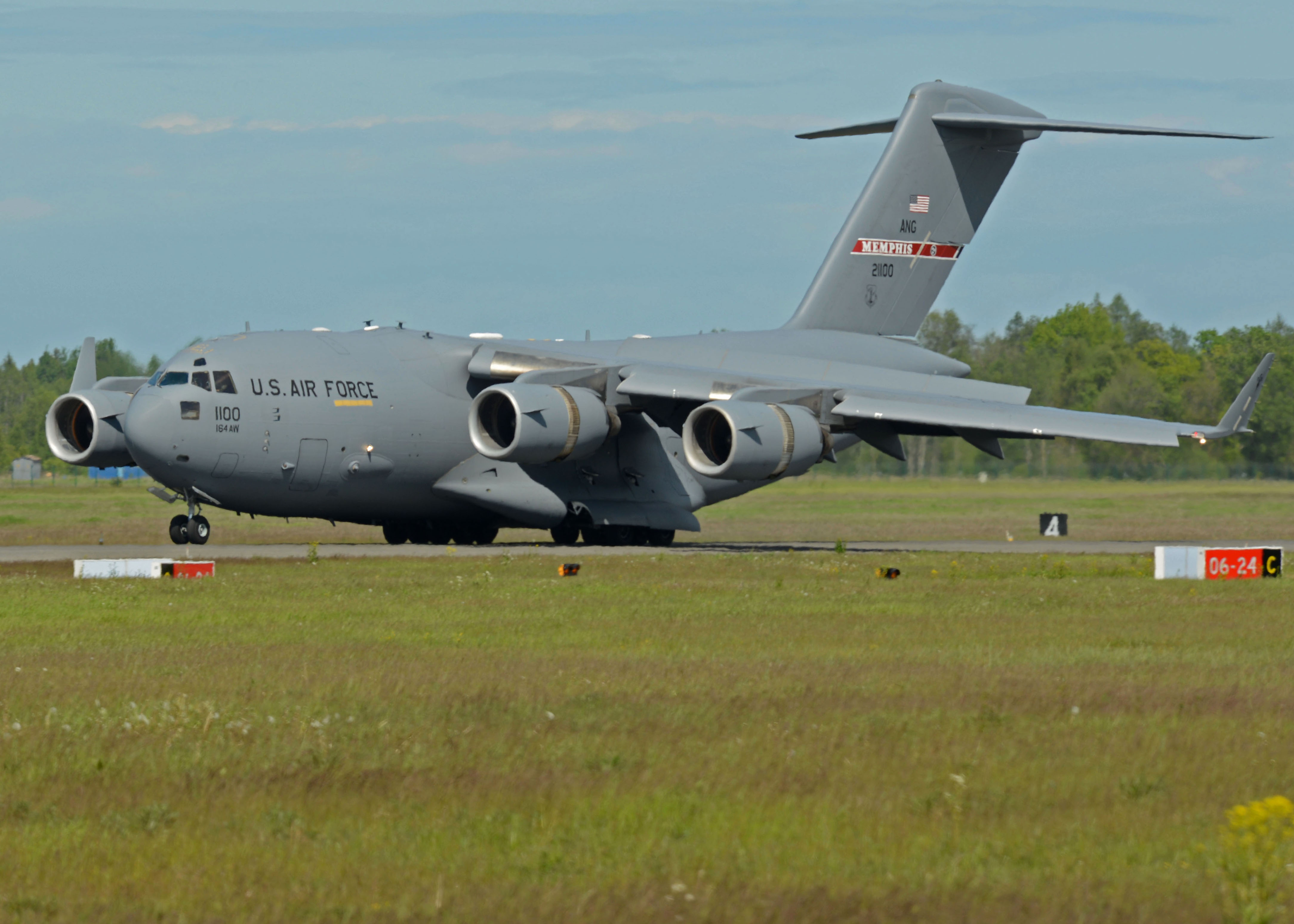
- 164th Airlift Wing C-17 Globemaster III
- Active: 1 April 1961 – present
- Country: United States
- Allegiance: Tennessee
- Branch: Air National Guard
- Type: Wing
- Role: Airlift
- Part of: Tennessee Air National Guard
- Garrison/HQ: Memphis Air National Guard Base, Memphis, Tennessee

Insignia
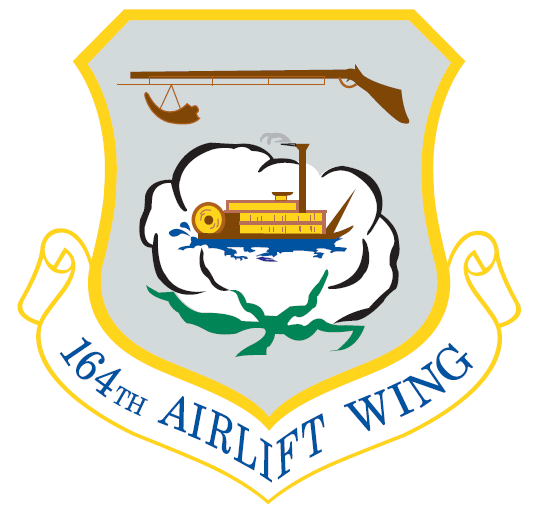
- 164th Airlift Wing emblem
- Tail Stripe: Red with "Memphis" in white letters

The 164th Airlift Wing is a unit of the Tennessee Air National Guard, stationed at Memphis Air National Guard Base, Tennessee. If activated to federal service in the United States Air Force, the 164th is gained by Air Mobility Command.

The wing has been an airlift unit since it was established as the 164th Air Transport Group in 1961, and has flown a variety of strategic and tactical airlift aircraft. After 34 years as a group, it was expanded to become a wing in 1995.

== Overview ==
The 164 Airlift Wing mission includes carrying fully equipped combat-ready military units to any point in the world on short notice and to provide field support required to sustain the fighting force.

== Units ==
- 164th Operations Group

155th Airlift Squadron
164th Operations Support Squadron

- 164th Mission Support Group

164th Civil Engineering Squadron
164th Communications Flight
164th Force Support Squadron
164th Logistics Readiness Squadron
164th Security Forces Squadron

- 164th Maintenance Group

164th Aircraft Maintenance Squadron
164th Maintenance Squadron

- 164th Medical Group

== History ==
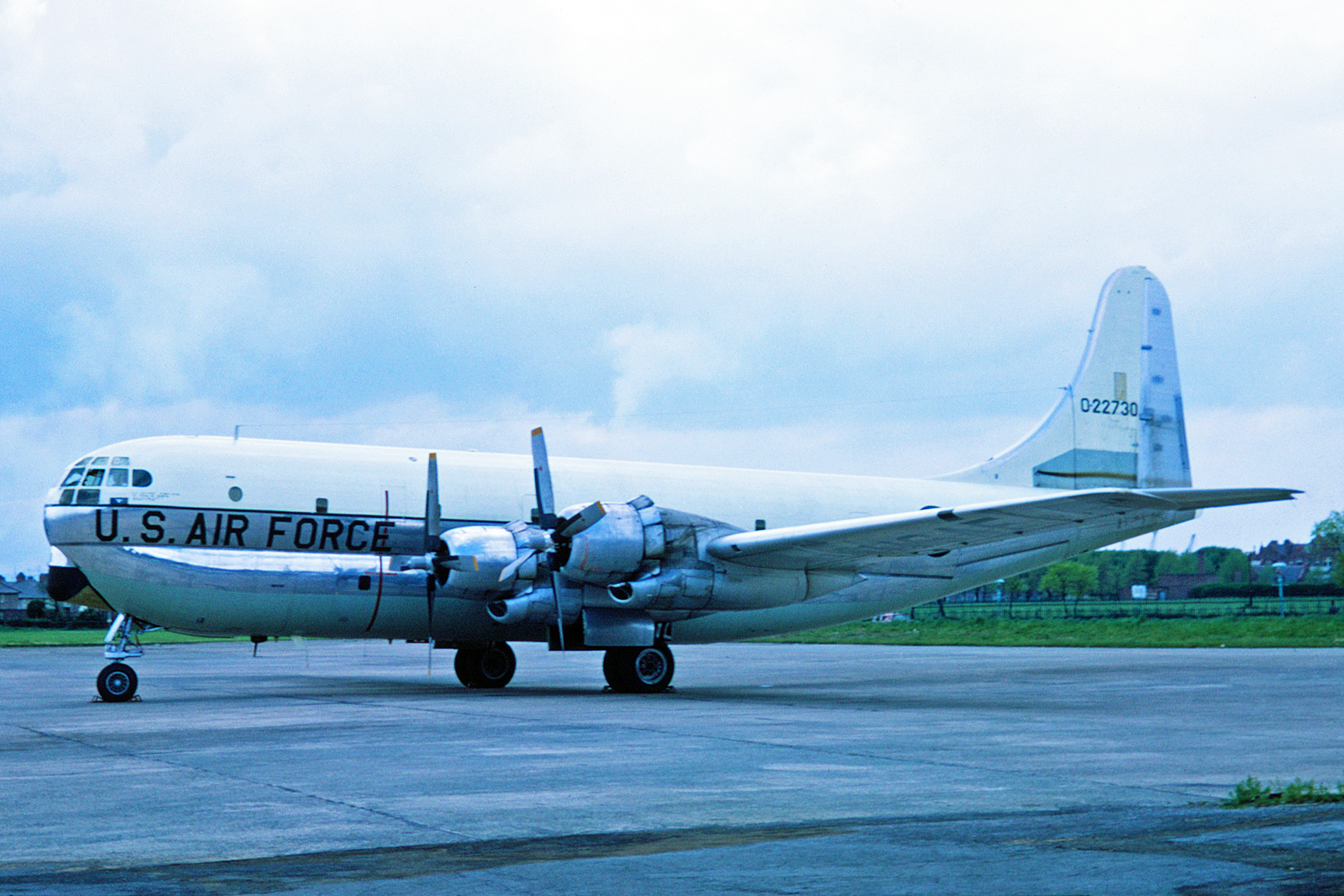
C-97G

The origins of the 164th Airlift Wing can be traced to December 1942, when the Army Air Forces activated the 359th Fighter Squadron. The 359th served during World War II in the European Theater of Operations. In 1946, the squadron was allotted to the National Guard as the 155th Fighter Squadron.

=== Strategic airlift operations ===
The 155th served as a fighter and tactical reconnaissance until 1 April 1961, when it converted to the Boeing C-97 Stratofreighter. With this transition, the unit that would eventually become the 164th Airlift Wing was activated as the 164th Air Transport Group, the headquarters for the 155th Air Transport Squadron and its supporting organizations. The entire organization was gained (when called to federal service) by Military Air Transport Service. Conversion to the Stratlfreighter brought a worldwide airlift mission to the group with operations to such places as Europe, Japan, South America, Australia and South Vietnam. On 1 January 1966, the group became the 164th Military Airlift Group as Military Air Transport Service was replaced by Military Airlift Command (MAC). Peak operations with the C-97 occurred in May 1966, when the unit flew 1702 hours and made ten round trips to Southeast Asia.

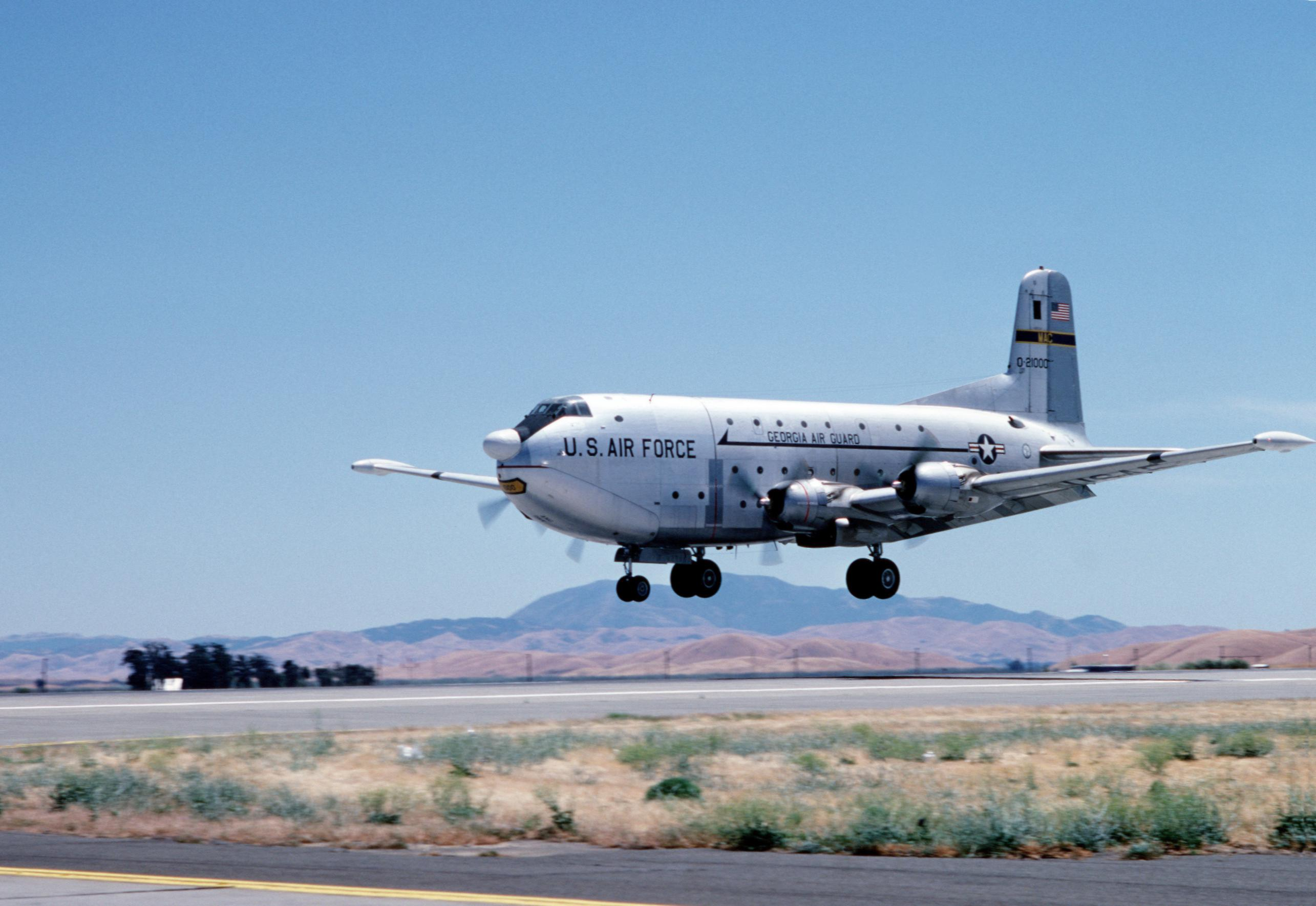
Air National Guard C-124

May 1967 brought the introduction of the Douglas C-124 Globemaster II, affectionately known as "Old Shakey", to the group. The group personnel performed numerous humanitarian missions as well as routine support missions for MAC. The Globemaster brought with it the capability to airdrop personnel and equipment, which the C-97 lacked, and the group assumed a secondary mission of tactical airlift. The C-124 was replaced in group service in 1974 by the Lockheed C-130 Hercules.

=== Tactical airlift operation ===
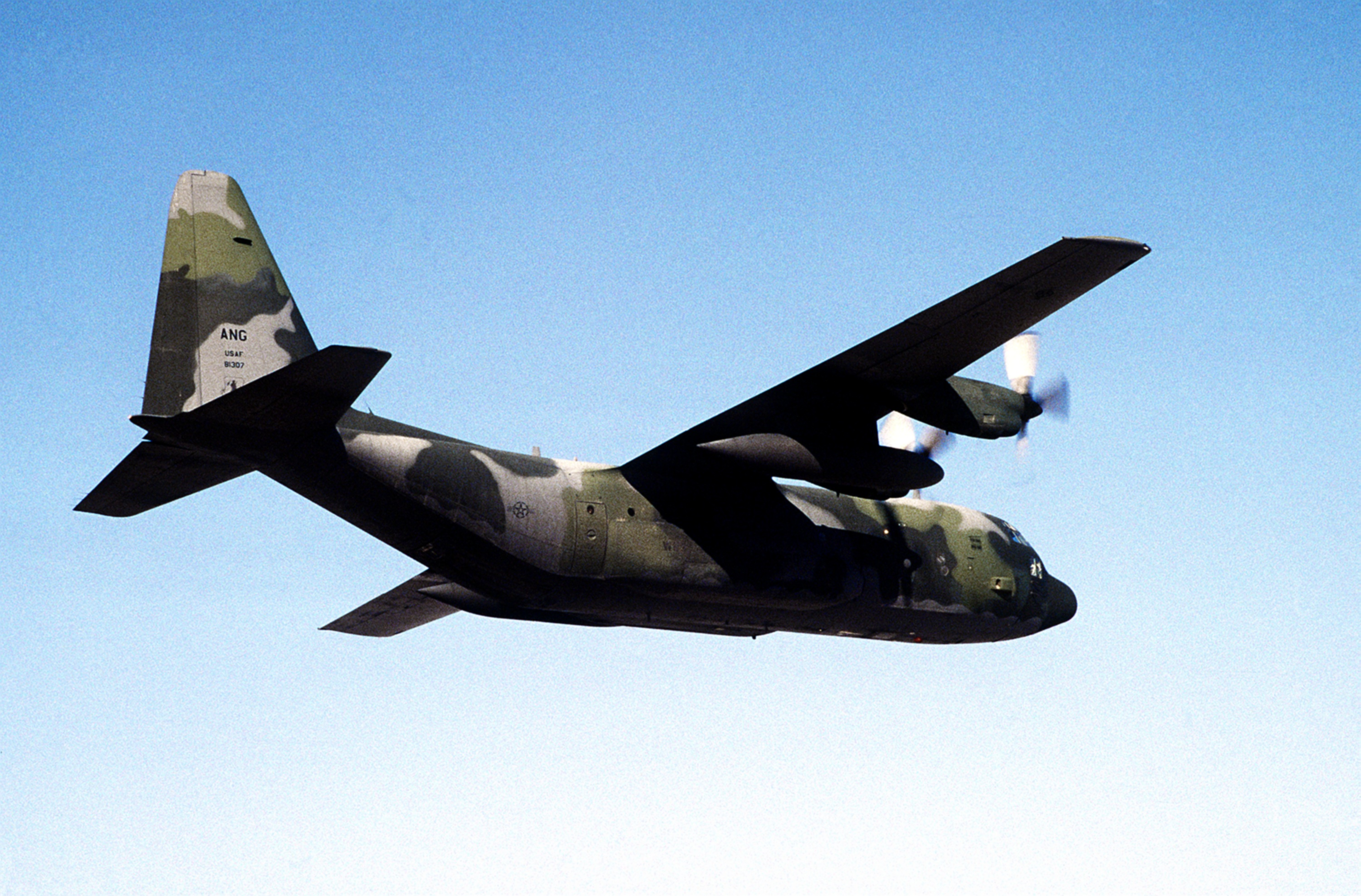
Air National Guard C-130 Hercules

The 164th's gaining command changed to the Tactical Air Command (TAC) as it assumed a C-130 tactical airlift mission and was redesignated as the 164th Tactical Airlift Group. However, its association with TAC was short-lived (although "Tactical" remained in its name), for in early 1975 all United States Air Force C-130 airlift aircraft were transferred to MAC, which again became the group's command upon mobilization. Throughout the remainder of the 1970s into 1990, the 164th provided worldwide tactical airlift support. Operation Desert Storm in 1991 brought on the activation of several units of the group. Its 164th Mobile Aerial Port Squadron was the first Air National Guard Aerial Port unit activated, subsequently serving a six-month tour in Southwest Asia.

=== Return to strategic airlift ===
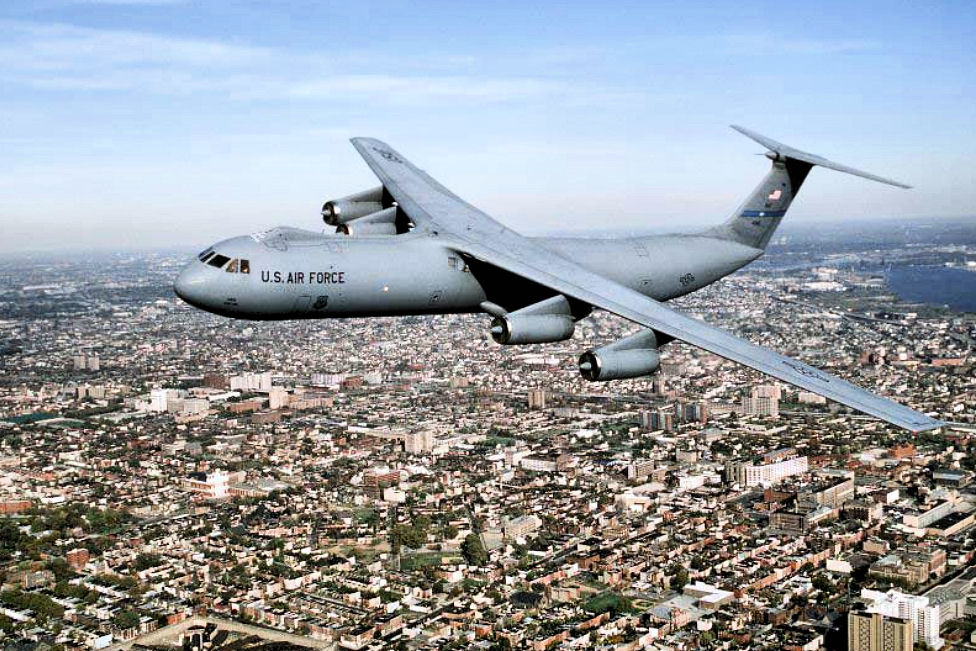
C-141 in flight

In April 1992, the 164th's C-130s were transferred to other units and the 164th received the first of eight C-141 Starlifter aircraft and returned to the strategic airlift mission. The conversion had been planned to occur earlier. but was delayed by the unit's partial mobilization during Desert Storm. For nearly three months the group flew both types. The Air Force dropped the distinction between "Tactical" and "Military" airlift units and the unit became the 164th Airlift Group. With the inactivation of MAC in June 1992, the unit was gained by the newly established Air Mobility Command.

As the National Guard implemented the Objective Wing organization, the group was assigned subordinate groups in 1994 and was redesignated the 164th Airlift Wing on 1 October 1995. In 2004, the 164th, one of the last units to operate the C-141C. retired its Starlifters and began operating the C-5 Galaxy.

In 2006, Colonel Bob Wilson, a former commander of the 155th Airlift Squadron, and former director of operations of the 164th Airlift Wing and a veteran Command Pilot of over 30 years experience in the Air Force and Air National Guard, was inducted into the Tennessee Aviation Hall of Fame in 2006.

In 2008, due to restructuring in the Air Force, the 164th Aerial Port Squadron was inactivated and its personnel were reassigned into the Air Terminal Function inside the Logistics Readiness Squadron. In September 2008, the 164th relocated from its former facility on Democrat Road to a new Air National Guard base on Swinnea Road. The new base was designed to provide adequate facilities to support the size and mission of the C-5A, including 3 maintenance hangars large enough to fully enclose a C-5. The old Air National Guard facility and property was purchased by FedEx to utilize for its operations at Memphis International Airport. This was the first Air Force facility constructed from the beginning to meet post 9/11 security standards.

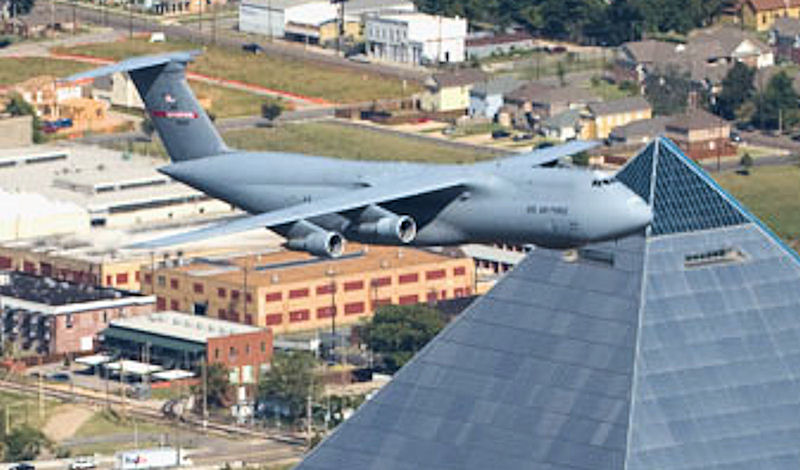
164th Airlift Wing C-5 Galaxy over Memphis, Tennessee

In February 2013, the 164th Airlift Wing began to convert from the Lockheed C-5 Galaxy to the Boeing C-17 Globemaster III, a conversion completed December 2015.

== Lineage ==
- Designated as the 164th Fighter Group (Air Defense) and allotted to the Air National Guard
- Redesignated 164th Air Transport Group, Heavy in 1961

Activated and extended federal recognition on 1 April 1961
Redesignated 164th Military Airlift Group on 1 January 1966
Redesignated 164th Tactical Airlift Group on 10 December 1974
Redesignated 164th Airlift Group on 16 April 1992
Redesignated 164th Airlift Wing on 1 October 1995

=== Assignments ===
- 118th Air Transport Wing (later 118th Military Airlift Wing, 118th Tactical Airlift Wing, 118th Airlift Wing), 1 April 1961 – 1 October 1995
- Tennessee Air National Guard, 1 October 1995 – Present

Gaining command

Military Air Transport Service, 1 April 1966
Military Airlift Command, 1 January 1966
Tactical Air Command, 10 December 1974
Military Airlift Command 1 December 1973
Air Mobility Command, 1 June 1992

=== Components ===
Groups

- 164th Logistics Group (later 164th Maintenance Group), 1 March 1994 – Present
- 164th Medical Group, 1 March 1994 – Present
- 164th Operations Group, 1 March 1994 – Present
- 164th Support Group (later 164th Mission Support Group), 1 March 1994 – Present

Squadrons

- 155th Air Transport Squadron (later 155th Military Airlift Squadron, 155th Tactical Airlift Squadron, 155th Airlift Squadron, 1 April 1961 – 1 March 1994

=== Stations ===
- Memphis Municipal Airport (later Memphis International Airport, Memphis Air National Guard Base), 1 April 1961 – Present

=== Aircraft ===
- Boeing C-97 Stratofreighter, 1961–1967
- Douglas C-124 Globemaster II, 1967–1974
- Lockheed C-130 Hercules, 1974–1992
- Lockheed C-141B Starlifter, 1992–2004
- Lockheed C-5 Galaxy, 2004–2013
- Boeing C-17 Globemaster III, 2013 – present

== See also ==
- List of groups and wings of the United States Air National Guard
- List of Lockheed C-130 Hercules operators
- List of MAJCOM wings of the United States Air Force
