= Massachusetts World War II Army Airfields =

Massachusetts World War II Army Airfields
- Part of United States Army

Site information
- Type: Army Airfields

Site history
- Built: 1940–1944
- In use: 1940–present

During World War II, the United States Army Air Forces (USAAF) established numerous airfields in Massachusetts for training pilots and aircrews of USAAF fighters and bombers.

Most of these airfields were under the command of First Air Force or the Army Air Forces Training Command (AAFTC). However the other USAAF support commands (Air Technical Service Command (ATSC); Air Transport Command (ATC)) commanded a significant number of airfields in a support roles.

It is still possible to find remnants of these wartime airfields. Many were converted into municipal airports, some were returned to agriculture and several were retained as United States Air Force installations and were front-line bases during the Cold War. Hundreds of the temporary buildings that were used survive today, and are being used for other purposes.

== Major Airfields ==
Air Technical Service Command

- Bedford Army Air Field, Bedford

432nd Base Headquarters and Air Base Squadron (Reduced), 20 January 1943–10 April 1944
144th Army Air Force Base Unit, 10 April 1944–14 October 1944
4147th Army Air Force Base Unit, 15 October 1944–25 February 1946
Was: Hanscom Airport (1947)
Was: Bedford Airfield (1948)
Now: Hanscom Air Force Base (1948–present)

- Logan Airport, Boston

Joint use USAAF/Navy/Civil Airport
Now: Logan International Airport (IATA: BOS, ICAO: KBOS, FAA LID: BOS)

First Air Force

- Westover Field, Chicopee

Unnumbered Air Base Squadron, 26th Air Base Group / 25th Air Base Squadron / 25th Base Headquarters and Air Base Squadron, 18 December 1940–10 April 1944
112th Army Air Force Base Unit, 10 April 1944–15 January 1946
Was Westover Air Force Base (1947-1974)
Now: Westover Joint Air Reserve Base (1974–present)

- Fort Devens Army Air Field, Fort Devens

307th Air Base Squadron / 307th Base Headquarters and Air Base Squadron (June 1942), 10 February 1942–1 April 1944
Used by United States Navy briefly around 1944
Was: Camp Devens Airfield (1926–1934)
Was: Fort Devens Airfield (1934–1977)
Was: Moore Army Airfield (1945–1995)
Now: Soon to be turned into an industrial park

- Otis Army Air Field, Falmouth

308th Air Base Squadron (Feb 1942)/308th Base Headquarters and Air Base Squadron (June 1942), 10 February 1942–10 April 1944
143rd Army Air Force Base Unit, 10 April 1944–1946
Transferred to United States Navy, May 1944–1946
Was: Otis Air Force Base (1952–1973)
Now: Otis Air National Guard Base (1973–present)
