= 303rd Tactical Reconnaissance Squadron =

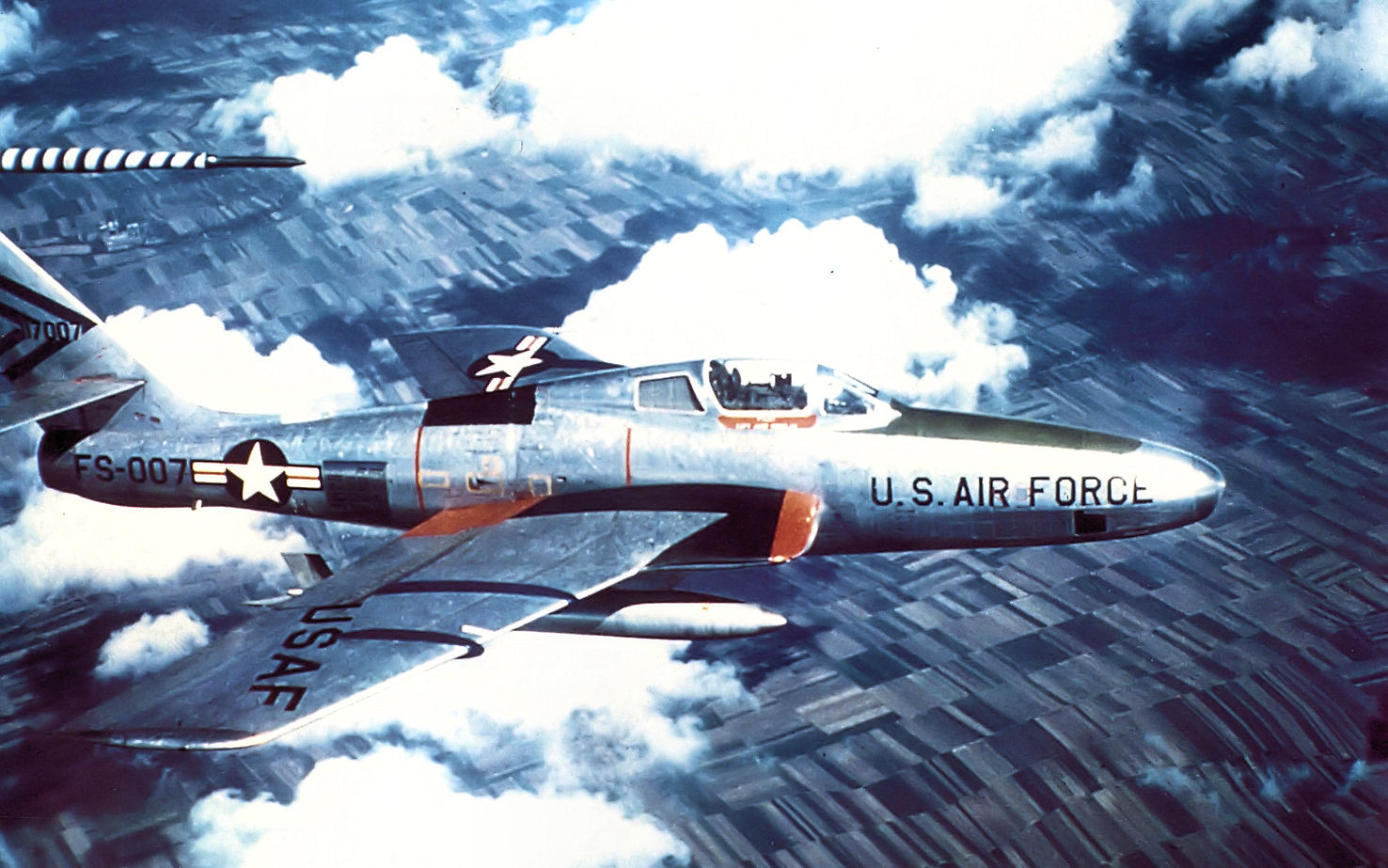
- 303rd Tactical Reconnaissance Squadron RF-84F Thunderflash
- Active: 1942–1945; 1953–1959
- Country: United States
- Branch: United States Air Force
- Role: Reconnaissance
- Part of: United States Air Forces Europe

Insignia
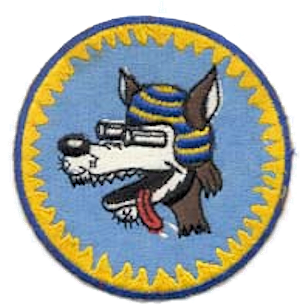
- Patch with the 302nd Tactical Reconnaissance Squadron emblem

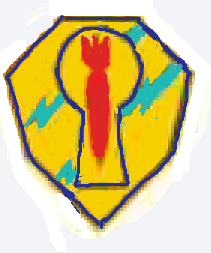
- 7th Observation Squadron emblem (Note: Approved 25 February 1943. Description: On a heptagon gold, piped ultramarine blue, a keyhole outlined ultramarine blue, inclosing a red aerial bomb, point to base and surmounting two light blue lightning bolts.)

The 303rd Tactical Reconnaissance Squadron is an inactive United States Air Force unit. It was last assigned to the 66th Tactical Reconnaissance Wing and stationed at Laon-Couvron Air Base, France. The squadron was first activated in January 1953 at Shaw Air Force Base, South Carolina, moving to Europe in July. The squadron performed reconnaissance missions for North Atlantic Treaty Organization from bases in Germany and France until it was inactivated in 1959 and replaced by a squadron flying more advanced aircraft.

In 1985, the squadron was consolidated with the 3rd Composite Squadron. a World War II unit that trained ground forces on air ground tactics until it was inactivated after the end of the war. The consolidated unit was designated the 303rd Tactical Electronic Warfare Squadron, but it has not been active since the consolidation.

== History ==
=== World War II ===
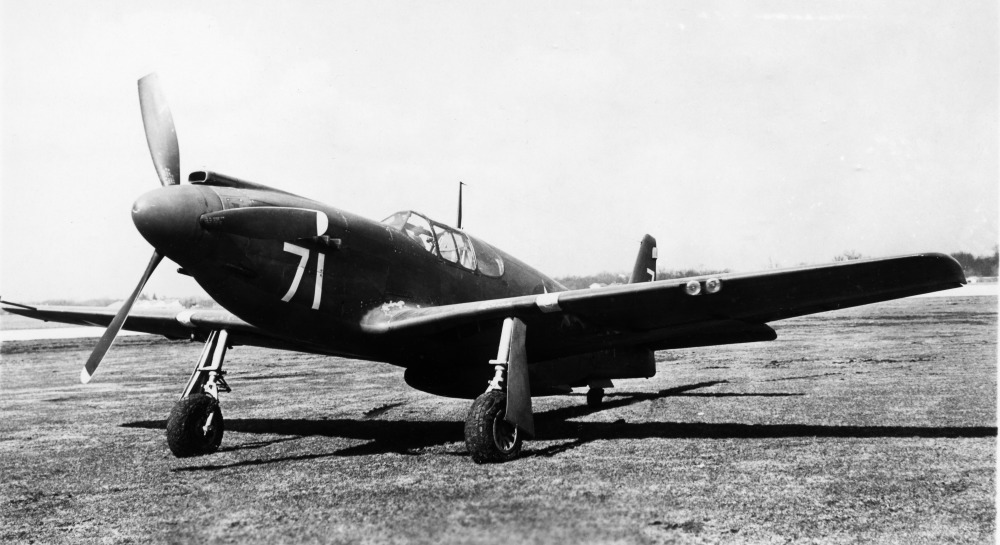
A-36 Apache, one of many types flown by the 3rd Composite Squadron

The 7th Observation Squadron (Note: This was the second Air Corps unit to carry the designation 7th Observation Squadron, the first, a unit established in 1917 as the 7th Aero Squadron, carried the designation from 1923 to 1937. By the time this 7th Observation Squadron was organized, the earlier unit was the 397th Bombardment Squadron, serving in South America. Maurer, Combat Squadrons, pp. 486-87.) was activated at Pope Field, North Carolina in February 1942 and assigned directly to the Office of the Chief of Air Corps. Like many observation units formed shortly after the attack on Pearl Harbor, it was equipped with a variety of observation and liaison aircraft. In March, the squadron was attached to the Army's Infantry School and moved the following month to Lawson Field, Georgia, which was located on Fort Benning, the home of the Infantry School. At Lawson, its primary mission was to provide aviation support for the training of ground forces.

In 1943, the squadron began to add fighter-bomber and light and medium bomber aircraft to its inventory, redesignating as the 3rd Composite Squadron in October to reflect its mix of aircraft whose mission was all forms of close air support for army ground forces. Missions were flown for units at Fort Bragg, and at Camp Rucker, Alabama and Camp Van Dorn, Mississippi. Eventually, the squadron would operate more than a dozen different types of aircraft. It continued its mission throughout the war, until it was inactivated in November 1945. The squadron was formally disbanded in October 1948.

In September 1985, the unit was reconstituted to permit its consolidation with the 303rd Tactical Reconnaissance Squadron.

=== Cold War tactical reconnaissance ===
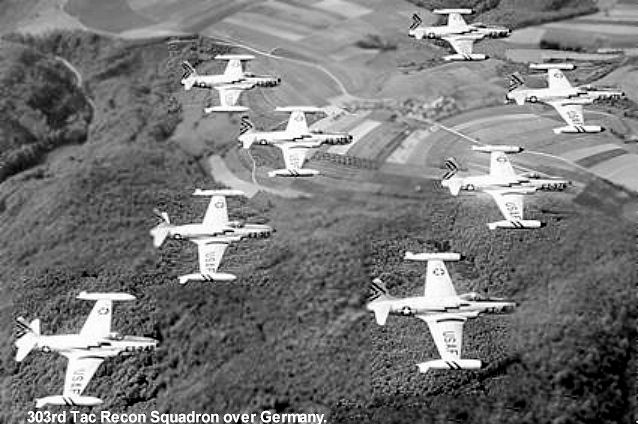
303rd Squadron RF-80A formation in 1954

The 303d Tactical Reconnaissance Squadron was activated on 1 January 1953 as part of the 66th Tactical Reconnaissance Group at Shaw Air Force Base, South Carolina. It assumed the personnel and second-line North American RF-51D Mustangs of the 185th Tactical Reconnaissance Squadron, an Oklahoma Air National Guard unit that had been mobilized for the Korean War and was being returned to state control. It trained at Shaw for tactical air reconnaissance missionsin anticipation of deployment to the North Atlantic Treaty Organization (NATO). In mid-1953 it was equipped with Lockheed RF-80A Shooting Star jet aircraft that had returned to the United States from use in the Korean War.

The 303rd deployed via the North Atlantic route to Sembach Air Base, West Germany, where it became part of United States Air Forces in Europe's Seventeenth Air Force during the summer of 1953. Initially, the squadron was limited in its missions with the RF-80 because its planes were equipped with more modern UHF radios, while most of the air traffic control systems in Europe were only equipped with VHF communications equipment, although by 1954, this began to change. Shortly after arrival, the squadron was assigned the mission of photo-mapping the Alpine areas of Austria. This mission had some urgency, because American military occupation forces were being withdrawn from Austria and tactical flying operations in the area would no longer be permitted.

It performed reconnaissance training at Sembach, and upgraded to the new Republic RF-84F Thunderflash in 1955. The squadron trained with NATO forces in Europe during the summer months. However, due to poor weather conditions in central Europe during the winter months, the unit deployed frequently to Wheelus Air Base, Libya and Nouasseur Air Base, Morocco for training. After 1956, the squadron participated in Royal Flush exercises, competitions among reconnaissance units from various NATO air forces. A squadron pilot won the low level competition in the first Royal Flush exercise.

The squadron moved to Laon-Couvron Air Base, France in mid-1958. The two squadrons of the 66th Wing flying Thunderflashes were programmed to be replaced by afterburner equipped McDonnell RF-101C Voodoos. Which would not be able to operate from the Sembach runway, due to its length and anticipated noise complaints from the villages of Sembach and Mehlingen, located next to the operational portion of the base. (Note: The administrative facilities at Sembach were located on a hilltop about a mile from the runway and hangars. The village of Sembach was situated between them, practically "across the street" from the runway. Gordon.) The squadron operated from Phalsbourg Air Base until September while improvements were made to the Laon runway.

In early 1959 it was announced that the RF-84 equipped squadrons assigned to the 66th Wing were to be inactivated and their places in the 66th taken by Voodoo equipped squadrons being deployed from Shaw. These new squadrons arrived at Laon in May 1959 and the 303rd was inactivated in late June.

In 1985, the 303rd was consolidated with the 3rd Composite Squadron and renamed the 303rd Tactical Electronic Warfare Squadron. However, the consolidated squadron has not been active.

== Lineage ==
3rd Composite Squadron

- Constituted as the 7th Observation Squadron (Special) on 28 January 1942

Activated on 6 February 1942
Redesignated: 7th Reconnaissance Squadron on 22 June 1943
Redesignated: 3rd Composite Squadron (Special) on 28 January 1942 on 9 October 1943
Inactivated on 7 November 1945
Disbanded on 8 October 1948
Reconstituted 19 September 1985 and consolidated with the 303rd Tactical Reconnaissance Squadron as the 303rd Tactical Electronic Warfare Squadron on 19 September 1985

303rd Tactical Electronic Warfare Squadron

- Constituted as the 303rd Tactical Reconnaissance Squadron on 15 November 1952
- Activated on 1 January 1953

Inactivated on 20 June 1959
Consolidated with the 3rd Composite Squadron on 19 September 1985

=== Assignments ===
- Office of the Chief of Air Corps, 6 February 1942
- Headquarters, United States Army Air Forces, 9 March 1942 (attached to Infantry School)
- III Reconnaissance Command, 30 August 1943
- I Tactical Air Division (later III Tactical Air Division), 8 November 1943
- III Tactical Air Command, 1 October 1944
- XIX Tactical Air Command, 25 October-7 November 1945
- 66th Tactical Reconnaissance Group, 1 January 1953
- 66th Tactical Reconnaissance Wing, 8 December 1957 - 20 June 1959

=== Stations ===
- Pope Field, North Carolina, 6 February 1942
- Lawson Field, Georgia, 6 April 1942 – 7 November 1945
- Shaw Air Force Base, South Carolina, 1 January 1953 – 1 July 1953
- Sembach Air Base, West Germany, 7 July 1953
- Laon-Couvron Air Base, France, 10 July 1958 – 20 June 1959

=== Aircraft ===
- Stinson L-1 Vigilant, 1942–1943
- Aeronca L-3, 1942–1944
- Piper L-4 Grasshopper, 1942
- North American O-47, 1942–1943
- Curtiss O-52 Owl, 1942–1943
- Northrop A-17, 1943
- Douglas A-20 Havoc, 1943–1944
- Bell P-39 Airacobra, 1943–1944
- North American B-25 Mitchell, 1943–1945
- Stinson L-5 Sentinel, 1943–1945
- Republic P-44 Rocket, 1944–1945
- North American P-51 Mustang, 1944–1945
- North American A-36 Apache, 1944
- Vultee BT-13 Valiant, 1944
- Douglas A-26 Invader, 1945
- North American RF-51D Mustang, 1953
- Lockheed RF-80A Shooting Star, 1953–1955
- Republic RF-84F Thunderflash, 1955–1959

=== Campaigns ===
Campaign Streamer	Campaign	Dates	Notes
	American Theater without inscription	6 February 1942 – 7 November 1945	7th Observation Squadron (later 7th Reconnaissance Squadron, 3rd Composite Squadron)
