= 66th Air Base Wing =

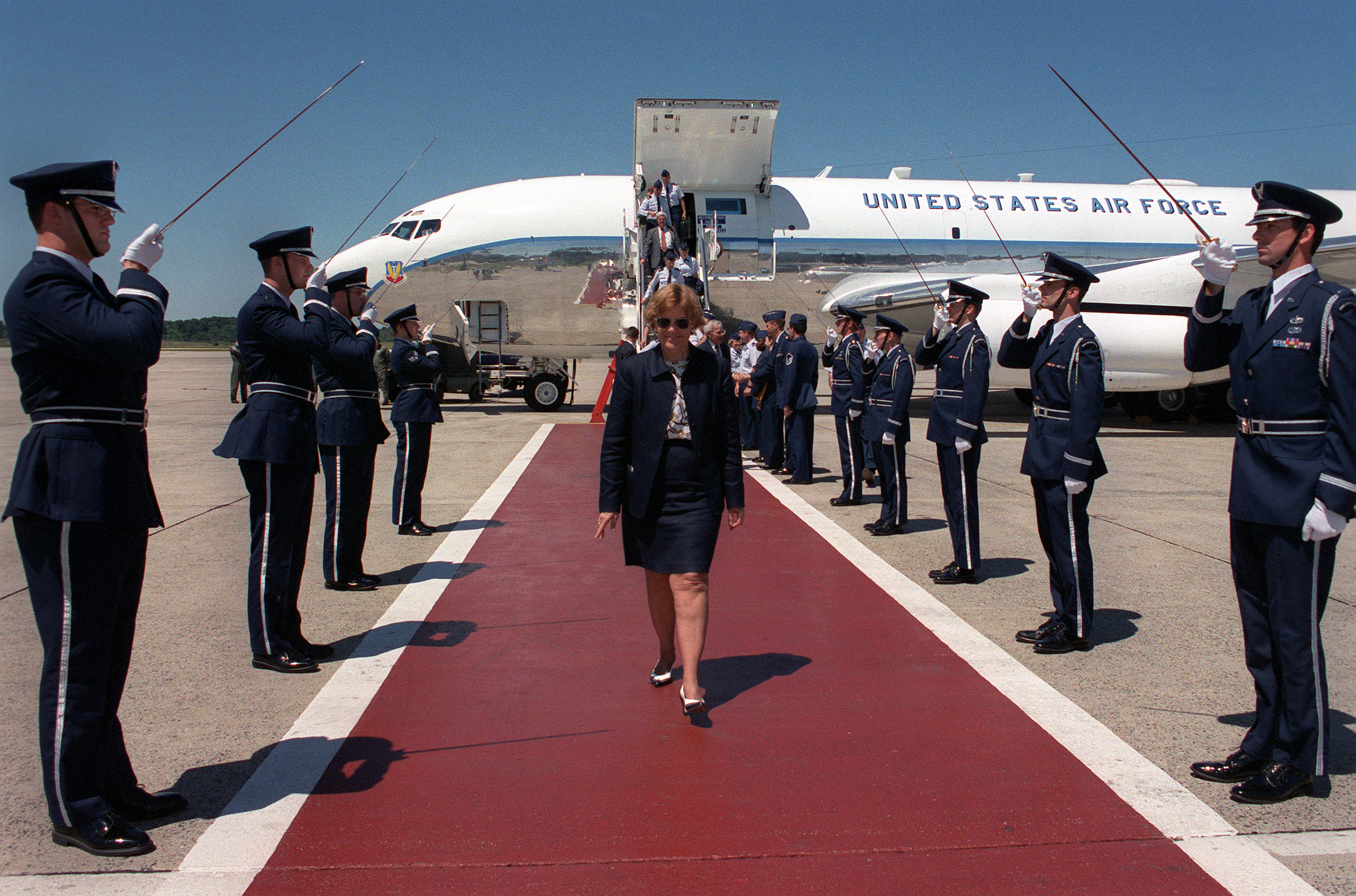
- Secretary of the Air Force Widnall arrives at Hanscom Field, for a tour of the nearby Hanscom AFB, 1997
- Active: 1953–1970; 1985–1992; 1994–2010
- Country: United States
- Branch: United States Air Force
- Role: Air base support
- Motto: Omnia Conspicimus (Latin for 'We Observe All')
- Decorations: Air Force Outstanding Unit Award; Air Force Organizational Excellence Award

Insignia
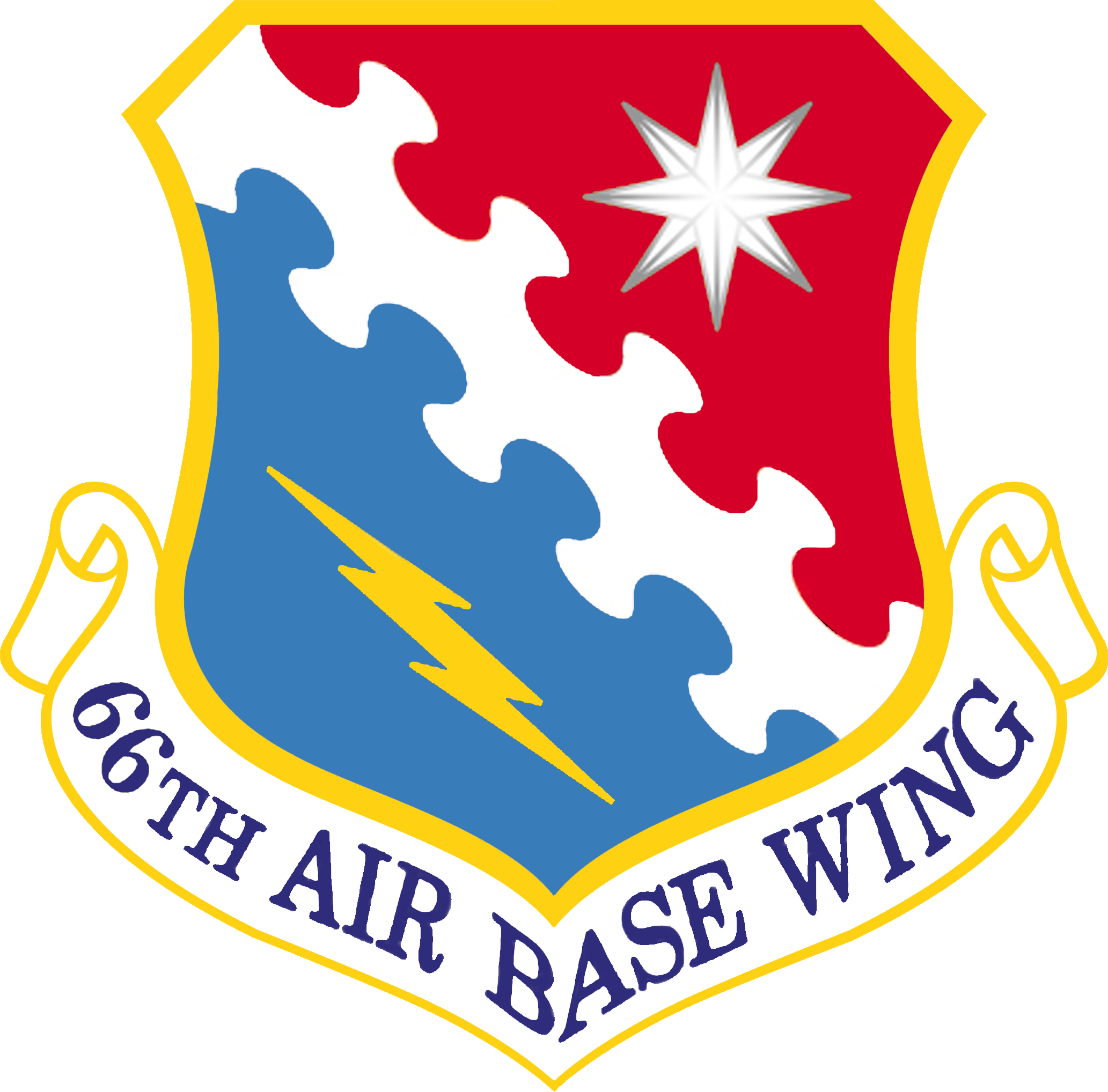
- 66th Air Base Wing emblem (Note: Approved 18 March 1986.)

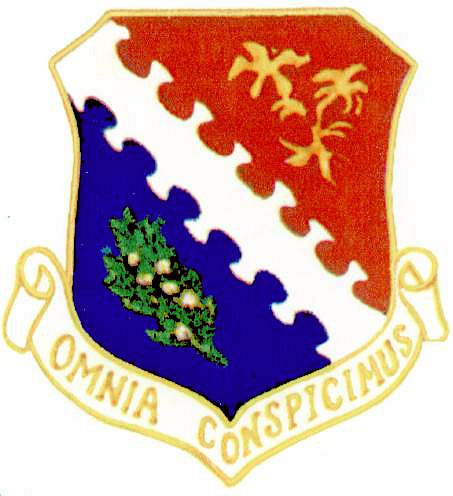
- 66th Tactical Reconnaissance Wing emblem (Note: Approved 26 May 1953.)

The 66th Air Base Wing is an inactive United States Air Force wing that was last active in September 2010 at Hanscom Air Force Base, Massachusetts, where it had served as the host organization since 1994. It was replaced at Hanscom by the smaller 66th Air Base Group.

The wing was first activated in January 1953 at Shaw Air Force Base, South Carolina as the 66th Tactical Reconnaissance Wing, replacing an Air National Guard wing that had been called into federal service for the Korean War. After re-equipping and completing training, the wing moved to Europe, where it provided tactical reconnaissance coverage for United States Air Forces Europe and NATO from bases in Germany, France and the United Kingdom until inactivating in 1970.

The wing was reactivated in 1985 as the 66th Electronic Combat Wing. During Operation Desert Storm it deployed forces to Southwest Asia that conducted combat electronic warfare missions. In addition to its flying mission, the wing supported a number of geographically separated units in Europe. It was inactivated in 1992 when one of its squadrons was reassigned and the other inactivated. Its support mission was transferred to another wing.

== History ==
=== Tactical reconnaissance ===
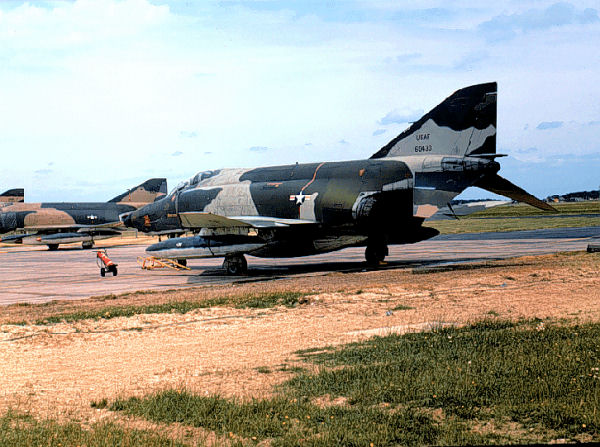
Wing RF-4C at Upper Heyford

The wing was first activated on 1 January 1953 at Shaw Air Force Base, South Carolina, where it replaced the 118th Tactical Reconnaissance Wing, a Tennessee Air National Guard unit that had been mobilized for the Korean War that was being returned to National Guard service. The wing completed its training and preparation for overseas service, which included the conversion of the 303d Tactical Reconnaissance Squadron from North American RF-51 Mustangs to Lockheed RF-80A Shooting Stars. The wing departed Shaw in June 1953.

The wing arrived at its first station in Europe, Sembach Air Base, West Germany, in early July 1953. It provided reconnaissance for USAFE and NATO from 1953 through 1970.

On 30 November 1954, the wing's 30th Tactical Reconnaissance Squadron received the first Martin RB-57A Canberras to replace its World War II vintage RB-26s. However, engine malfunctions, structural deficiencies and lack of supporting equipment and parts plagued the RB-57A, and the wing soon began to replace them with RB-66s. In August 1955, the 302d and 303d Squadrons started to receive the Republic RF-84F Thunderflash.

On 1 January 1957 a fourth squadron, the 19th Tactical Reconnaissance Squadron at RAF Sculthorpe, was transferred to the 66th. The squadron initially flew the North American RB-45C Tornado. The squadron remained at Sculthrope while part of the wing. At Sculthorpe, the 19th became one of the first in USAFE to transition to the Douglas RB-66B Destroyer aircraft. One year after its assignment to the wing, the 19th was reassigned to the 10th Tactical Reconnaissance Wing.

=== Electronic Combat ===
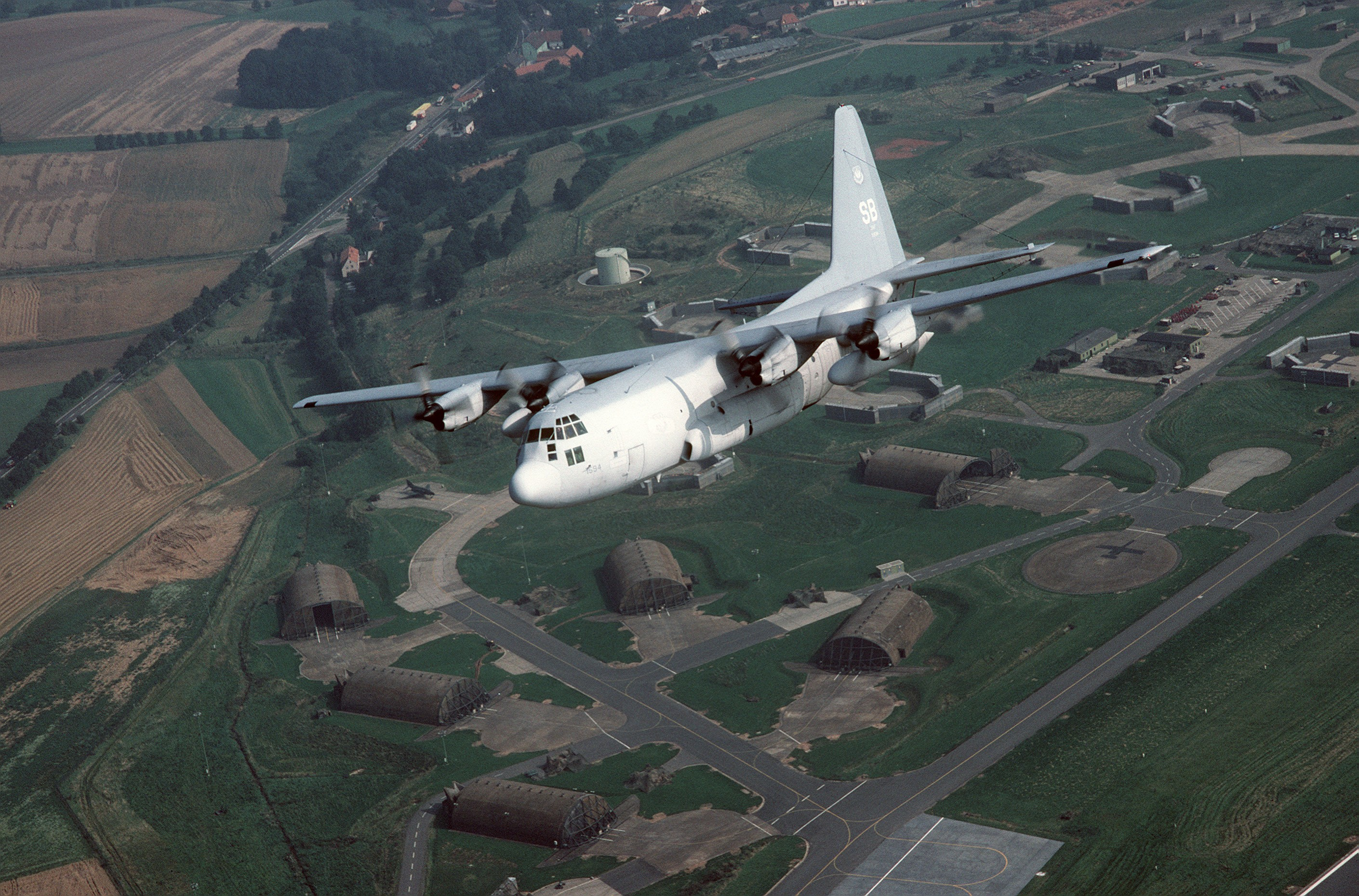
EC-130H over Sembach AB

The wing returned to Sembach as the 66th Electronic Combat Wing in 1985. Its 43d Electronic Combat Squadron trained US and NATO forces on Lockheed EC-130H Compass Call electronic countermeasures aircraft. The wing's 42d Electronic Combat Squadron, stationed at RAF Upper Heyford, flew EF-111A Raven aircraft under the operational control of the 20th Tactical Fighter Wing.

The wing was assigned host wing responsibilities that included support of numerous geographically separated units and logistical support for flying units of the 601st Tactical Control Wing located at Sembach. The wing deployed aircraft and personnel to Southwest Asia and Turkey, providing tactical and electronic combat operations in Operation Desert Storm against Iraq from 17 January through 28 February 1991. In July 1991, the 42d Squadron was transferred to the 20th Fighter Wing as the Air Force began to transition to the Objective Wing organization, which called for all units on a base to be assigned to one wing. The 43d Squadron was inactivated, leaving the wing without tactical flying squadrons. At the end of March 1992, the wing was inactivated and its support functions transferred to the 601st Support Wing.

=== Air Base Support ===
Redesignated the 66th Air Base Wing, and activated in 1994 to replace the 647th Air Base Group, the wing provided support and services to active-duty, Air Force Reserve and Air National Guard military personnel, civilians and contractors at Hanscom Air Force Base, Massachusetts. Additionally, the wing supports over 100,000 retired military personnel, annuitants and spouses living in the seven-state area of New England and New York.

On 26 March 2010 the wing commander, Colonel David "Iron" Orr, was relieved of his position by Lieutenant General Ted Bowlds, commander of the Electronic Systems Center. Bowlds found that Orr had held an unprofessional relationship with a subordinate female lieutenant colonel and had exhibited undue favoritism to the officer with regards to a promotion recommendation.

With the mission at Hanscom shrinking, the wing was inactivated on 30 September 2010 and replaced by the smaller 66th Air Base Group.

== Lineage ==
- Constituted as the 66th Tactical Reconnaissance Wing on 15 November 1952
- Activated on 1 January 1953
- Inactivated on 1 April 1970
- Redesignated 66th Electronic Combat Wing and activated on 1 June 1985
- Inactivated on 31 March 1992
- Redesignated 66th Air Base Wing on 16 September 1994
- Activated on 1 October 1994
- Inactivated on 30 September 2010

=== Assignments ===
- Ninth Air Force, 1 January 1953
- Twelfth Air Force, 7 July 1953
- United States Air Forces in Europe, 1 January 1958
- Seventeenth Air Force, 15 November 1959
- Third Air Force, 1 September 1966 – 1 April 1970
- 65th Air Division, 1 June 1985
- Seventeenth Air Force, 30 June 1991 – 31 March 1992
- Electronic Systems Center, 1 October 1994 – 30 September 2010

=== Components ===
Group

- 66th Tactical Reconnaissance Group: 1 January 1953 – 8 December 1957

Squadrons

- 17th Tactical Reconnaissance Squadron: 10 May 1959 – 12 January 1970
- 18th Tactical Reconnaissance Squadron: 1 June 1959 – 30 January 1970
- 19th Tactical Reconnaissance Squadron: 8 December 1957 – 8 March 1958 (attached to the 10th Tactical Reconnaissance Wing after 8 January 1958)

RAF Sculthorpe

- 30th Tactical Reconnaissance Squadron: 8 December 1957 – 8 March 1958 (detached 8 January-8 March 1958)
- 32d Tactical Reconnaissance Squadron: attached 8 January-7 March 1958, assigned 8 March 1958 – 1 October 1965
- 38th Tactical Reconnaissance Squadron: attached 8 January-7 March 1958, assigned 8 March 1958 – 1 January 1966
- 42d Electronic Combat Squadron: 1 June 1985 – 25 January 1991 (detached 2 June 1985 – 24 January 1991)

RAF Upper Heyford

- 43d Electronic Combat Squadron: 1 October 1986 – 31 July 1991 (attached to 20th Tactical Fighter Wing 17 January – 10 March 1991, 7 – 14 April 1991)
- 302d Tactical Reconnaissance Squadron: 8 December 1957 – 20 June 1959
- 303d Tactical Reconnaissance Squadron: 8 December 1957 – 20 June 1959

=== Stations ===
- Shaw Air Force Base, South Carolina, 1 January – 25 June 1953
- Sembach Air Base, West Germany, 7 July 1953
- Laon-Couvron Air Base, France, 10 July 1958
- RAF Upper Heyford, England, 1 September 1966 – 1 April 1970
- Sembach Air Base, Germany, 1 June 1985 – 31 March 1992
- Hanscom Air Force Base, Massachusetts, 1 October 1994 – 30 September 2010

=== Aircraft ===
- North American RF-51K Mustang, 1953
- Douglas RB-26B Invader, 1953–1955
- Lockheed RF-80A Shooting Star, 1953–1956
- Martin RB-57A Canberra, 1954–1955, 1955–1958
- Martin B-57A Canberra, 1955–1956
- Republic RF-84F Thunderflash, 1955–1959
- Douglas RB-66B Invader, 1957–1958
- North American RB-45C Tornado, 1957
- McDonnell RF-101C Voodoo, 1958–1970
- McDonnell RF-4C Phantom II, 1969–1970
- EF-111A Raven, 1985–1991
- Lockheed EC-130H Compass Call, 1986–1991

=== Awards and campaigns ===
- Decorations. Air Force Outstanding Unit Awards: 1 Jan-31 Dec 1962; 1 Apr 1987 – 1 Mar 1989; 1 Jun 1989 – 31 May 1991; 1 Jun 1991 – 31 Mar 1992; 1 Jan 1996 – 31 Dec 1997. Air Force Organizational Excellence Award: 1 Jan 2003 – 31 Dec 2004.
