= 155th Airlift Squadron =

155th Airlift Squadron

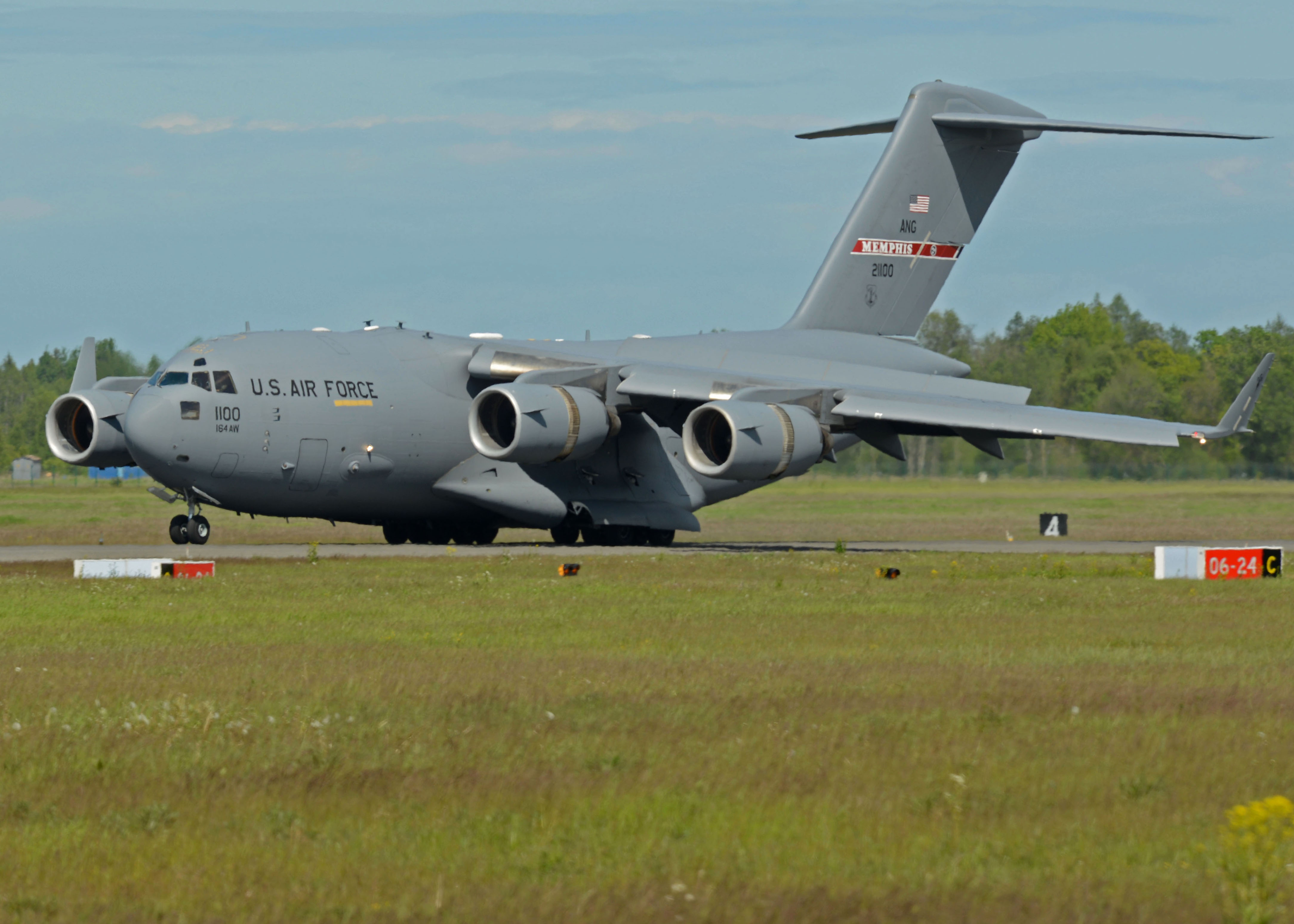
- 155th Airlift Squadron C-17 Globemaster III
- Active: 1942–1945; 1946–1953; 1953–present
- Country: United States
- Allegiance: Tennessee
- Branch: Air National Guard
- Type: Squadron
- Role: Airlift
- Part of: Tennessee Air National Guard
- Garrison/HQ: Memphis Air National Guard Base, Tennessee
- Nickname: "Memphis Belle"
- Tail stripe
- Engagements: European Theater of Operations; Vietnam War
- Decorations: Distinguished Unit Citation

Insignia
- 155th Airlift Squadron emblem

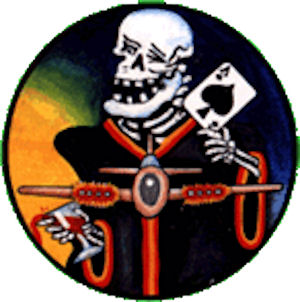
- 359th Fighter Squadron emblem

The 155th Airlift Squadron is a unit of the Tennessee Air National Guard 164th Airlift Wing. It is assigned to Memphis Air National Guard Base, Tennessee and is equipped with the Boeing C-17 aircraft.

== History ==
=== World War II ===
Organized and trained in the Northeast United States by First Air Force. During training was part of the air defense of the northeast, being attached to the New York and Boston Fighter Wings.

Deployed to England aboard the RMS Queen Elizabeth and served in combat as part of VIII Fighter Command from October 1943 to May 1945, participating in operations that prepared for the invasion of the Continent, and supporting the landings in Normandy and the subsequent Allied drive across France and Germany. The squadron flew P-47 Thunderbolts until they were replaced by P-51 Mustangs in November 1944.

From October 1943 until January 1944, operated as escort for B-17 Flying Fortress/B-24 Liberator bombers that attacked such objectives as industrial areas, missile sites, airfields, and communications.

Fighters from the 461st engaged primarily in bombing and strafing missions after 3 January 1944, with its targets including U-boat installations, barges, shipyards, aerodromes, hangars, marshalling yards, locomotives, trucks, oil facilities, flak towers, and radar stations. Bombed and strafed in the Arnhem, Netherlands area on 17, 18, and 23 September 1944 to neutralize enemy gun emplacements providing support to Allied ground forces during Operation Market-Garden. In early 1945, the squadron's P-51 Mustangs clashed with German Me 262 jet aircraft. The squadron flew its last combat mission, escorting B-17s dropping propaganda leaflets, on 7 May 1945.

Remained in the United Kingdom during the balance of 1945, most personnel were demobilized and returned to the United States, with aircraft being sent to storage facilities in the UK. The squadron was administratively inactivated at Camp Kilmer New Jersey on 10 November 1945 without personnel or equipment.

=== Tennessee Air National Guard ===
Redesignated: 155th Fighter Squadron, and allotted to Tennessee ANG, on 24 May 1946, extended federal recognition and activated on 3 February 1947. Assigned to the 118th Fighter Group at Berry Field, Nashville, flying the P-47 Thunderbolt aircraft. Was converted to a Tactical Reconnaissance Squadron in February 1951, being re-equipped with the RB-26 Invader.

Was Federalized and placed on active duty, 2 March 1951, remaining at Memphis Municipal Airport. Released from active duty and returned to Tennessee state controlon 1 January 1953. The unit was redesignated as a jet photo reconnaissance organization on 1 April 1956 and equipped with the RF-84 Thunderflash, the jets being received directly from the factory for use in this mission.

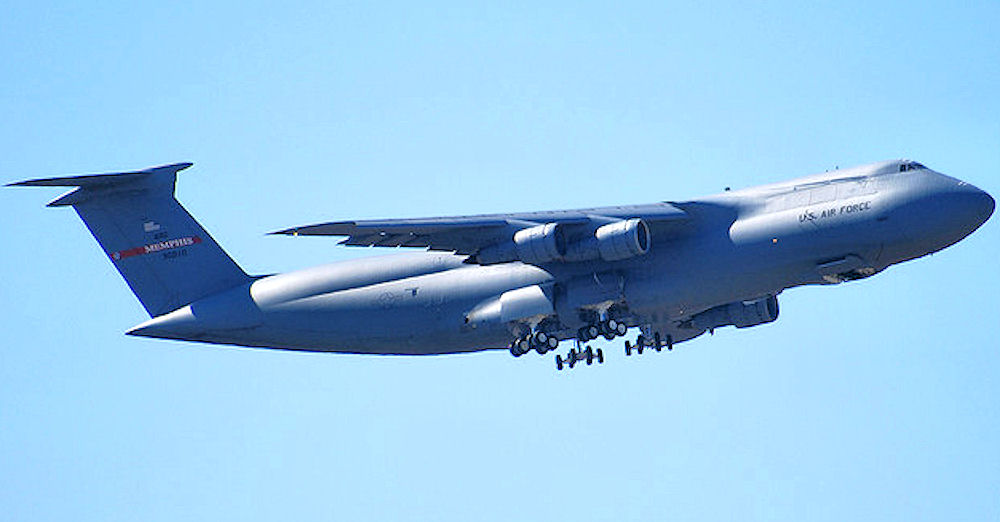
155th Airlift Squadron – Lockheed C-5 Galaxy taking off from Memphis International Airport

Was expanded and the organization in Memphis was upgraded to a group level on 1 April 1961, the squadron being assigned to the new 164th Air Transport Group. Was realigned to becoming a strategic transport unit under Military Air Transport Service, being equipped with C-97 freighters. Conversion to this aircraft brought a worldwide mission with operations to such places as Europe, Japan, South America, Australia, and South Vietnam.

During May 1966, the unit set numerous records, to include 10 round trips to Southeast Asia and 1702 flying hours in one month, all accomplished primarily by dedicated part-time personnel. May 1967 brought the introduction of the C-124 Globemaster, affectionately known as "Old Shakey". Along with Old Shakey, the squadron's personnel performed numerous humanitarian missions as well as routine support to Military Airlift Command (MAC).

The C-124 was given a well-deserved rest in 1974 when she was retired from military service, reluctantly giving up her berth to the C-130 Hercules. The C-130s were transferred to other units in April 1992 when the unit received the first of eight C-141 Starlifter aircraft. In 2004, the squadron retired the C-141 and began operating the C-5A Galaxy. 18 December 2012 the 1st C-17A of 8 arrived.

== Lineage ==
- Constituted as the 359th Fighter Squadron on 8 December 1942

Activated on 12 December 1942
Inactivated on 10 November 1945

- Redesignated 155th Fighter Squadron and allotted to the National Guard on 24 May 1946.

Extended federal recognition and activated on 3 February 1947
Redesignated 155th Tactical Reconnaissance Squadron, Night Photographic on 1 February 1951
Federalized and placed on active duty on 2 March 1951
Inactivated, released from active duty and returned to Tennessee state control on 1 January 1953
Redesignated 155th Tactical Reconnaissance Squadron, Jet on 1 April 1956
Redesignated 155th Air Transport Squadron on 1 April 1961
Redesignated 155th Military Airlift Squadron on 1 January 1966
Redesignated 155th Tactical Airlift Squadron on 1 August 1974
Redesignated 155th Airlift Squadron on 16 April 1992

=== Assignments ===
- 356th Fighter Group, 12 Dec 1942 – 10 Nov 1945
- 118th Fighter Group (later 118th Composite Group, 118th Tactical Reconnaissance Group), 3 February 1947 – 1 January 1953
- 118th Tactical Reconnaissance Group, 1 January 1953
- 164th Air Transport Group (later 164th Military Airlift Group, 164th Tactical Airlift Group, 164th Airlift Group), 1 April 1961
- 164th Operations Group, 1 October 1995 – present

=== Stations ===
- Westover Field, Massachusetts, 12 December 1942
- Groton Army Air Field, Connecticut, 11 March 1943
- Mitchel Field, New York, 30 May 1943
- Grenier Field, New Hampshire, 4 July–19 August 1943
- RAF Goxhill (AAF-345), England, 26 August 1943
- RAF Martlesham Heath (AAF-359), England, 12 October 1943 – 4 November 1945
- Camp Kilmer, New Jersey, 9–10 Nov 1945
- Memphis Municipal Airport, 3 February 1947
- Shaw Air Force Base, South Carolina. January 1951 – 1 January 1953
- Memphis Municipal Airport (later Memphis International Airport, Memphis Air National Guard Base), 1 January 1953 – present

=== Aircraft ===
- P-47 (later F-47) Thunderbolt, 1943–1944, 1947–1951
- P-51 Mustang, 1944–1945
- RB-26 Invader, 1951–1956
- RF-84F Thunderstreak, 1956–1961
- C-97 Stratofreighter, 1961–1967
- C-124 Globemaster II, 1967–1974
- C-130 Hercules, 1974–1992
- C-141B Starlifter, 1992–2004
- C-5A Galaxy, 2004–2012
- C-17 Globemaster III, 2012–present
