= Hanscom Air Force Base =

US Air Force base near Bedford, Massachusetts, US

- Bedford, Massachusetts in United States of America
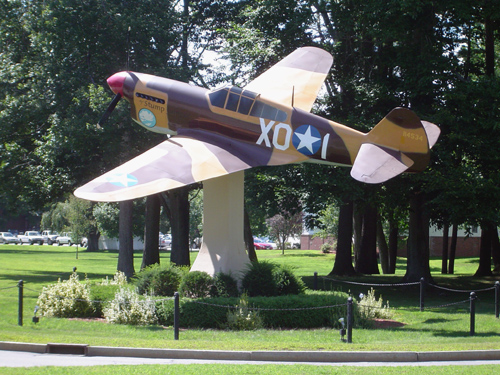
- A full-size model of a Curtiss P-40 Warhawk on static display at Hanscom AFB.

Site information
- Type: US Air Force Base (non-flying)
- Owner: Department of Defense
- Operator: US Air Force
- Controlled by: Air Force Materiel Command (AFMC)
- Condition: Operational
- Website: www.hanscom.af.mil

Location
- Shown in United States
- Coordinates: 42°28′12″N 071°17′21″W

Site history
- Built: 1941
- In use: 1942–present

Garrison information
- Garrison: 66th Air Base Group; Air Force Life Cycle Management Center

Hanscom Air Force Base (AFB) is a United States Air Force base located predominantly within Bedford, Massachusetts, with portions extending into the adjoining towns of Lincoln, Concord and Lexington. The facility is adjacent to Hanscom Field which provides general aviation and charter service.

Hanscom AFB is a part of the Air Force Life Cycle Management Center, one of six centers under Air Force Materiel Command (AFMC). The Air Force Life Cycle Management Center is the single center responsible for total life cycle management of Air Force weapon systems and is headquartered at Wright-Patterson AFB, Ohio. The host unit at Hanscom is the 66th Air Base Group (66 ABG) assigned to AFMC.

A portion of the base is listed as a census-designated place by the U.S. Census Bureau for statistical purposes. The resident population as of 2020 was 1,516 at the 2020 census.

== Overview ==
A non-flying base, Hanscom Air Force Base is named after Laurence G. Hanscom (1906–1941), a pilot, aviation enthusiast, and State House reporter who was killed in a plane crash at Saugus, Massachusetts. Hanscom was a reporter for the Boston Globe, Worcester Telegram & Gazette and the Wilmington (MA) News. Hanscom was active in early aviation, founding the Massachusetts Civil Air Reserve. At the time of his death, Hanscom had been lobbying for the establishment of an airfield in Bedford. The base was named in his honor on 26 June 1941.

Hanscom Field, a civilian general-aviation airport adjacent to the Air Force Base, and Massport are the primary operators of the air field and runways. Less than one percent of the air traffic at Hanscom Field is military aircraft.

== History ==
=== World War II ===
Hanscom Air Force Base began its existence while the United States was considering its entry into World War II. In May 1941, the Massachusetts Legislature authorized the purchase of a large tract of farmland spanning the borders of the towns of Bedford, Lincoln, Concord and Lexington for a Boston Auxiliary Airport. Funds to build the new airport were contributed by the federal government, which had appropriated $40 million to build 250 new civil airports across the United States that could serve for future national defense.

In mid-1942, the Commonwealth of Massachusetts leased the Bedford airport to the War Department for use by the Army Air Forces. Fighter squadrons trained there in 1942 through 1943. The 85th Fighter Squadron and the 318th Fighter Squadron, who trained at Bedford on the Curtiss P-40 Warhawk, went on to combat in North Africa and Europe.

In February 1943, the airport was renamed Laurence G. Hanscom Field in honor of a Massachusetts-born pilot and aviation enthusiast who had been a reporter for the Worcester Telegram & Gazette. Hanscom had died in February 1941, in an aircraft accident in Saugus, Massachusetts, while he was lobbying vigorously at the State House for the establishment of the airport at Bedford.

Later in the war, the Bedford Army Air Field served as a site for testing new radar sets developed by MIT's Radiation Laboratory, the United States' primary radar research and development program. It was this secondary wartime activity at Hanscom that gave rise to the base's postwar role.

=== Cold War ===
Since 1945 Hanscom has emerged as the Air Force's center for the development and acquisition of electronic systems. The base has also played a significant role in the creation of a national high-technology area around Route 128.

World War II established the key military importance of radar. In 1945, when the MIT and Harvard wartime laboratories were dissolved, the Army Air Forces aimed to continue some of their programs in radar, radio and electronic research. It recruited scientists and engineers from the laboratories, and its new Air Force Cambridge Research Laboratories (AFCRL) took over MIT's test site at Hanscom Field.

By 1950, the Air Force was working closely with MIT to develop a new air defense system for the continental United States. Expanding its facilities at Hanscom Field was a step to accomplishing this massive project. After some negotiation, the Commonwealth of Massachusetts agreed in May 1952 to cede land on one side of the airport to the federal government and to give a 25-year renewable lease on the airfield itself.

The first buildings for the new MIT Lincoln Laboratory at Hanscom were completed in 1952, and the Air Force's electronic and geophysics laboratories in Cambridge started to migrate out to its own new facilities in Bedford in 1954. The airfield's runways were reconfigured and expanded in 1953, and new hangars, headquarters and facilities were built. To provide test and evaluation for Lincoln Lab's new "Cape Cod" experimental air defense system, Hanscom's 6520th Test Support Wing logged thousands of hours of flying time. In April 1960, the 3245th Air Base Wing was organized to undertake routine support around the base.

The Semi-Automatic Ground Environment (SAGE) air defense computer system, completed in the early 1960s, revolutionized air defense and also contributed significantly to advances in air traffic control systems. As the SAGE system matured, the Air Force developed a number of advanced command, control and communications systems.

In 1961 the Electronic Systems Division (ESD) was established at Hanscom Field in order to consolidate the management of the Air Force's electronic systems under one agency. Since that time, the ESD (re-designated the Electronic Systems Center in 1992) has been the host organization on the base. The 3245th Air Base Wing was redesignated as the 3245th Air Base Group on 1 July 1964, remaining responsible to the ESD.

While Hanscom's role in system acquisition flourished after the 1950s, its operational mission gradually diminished. As of September 1973, all regular military flying operations at Hanscom ceased. The following year the Air Force terminated its lease of the airfield portion of Hanscom Field, which reverted to state control, but retained the right to use the field. The Air Force re-designated its own acreage surrounding the field as the Laurence G. Hanscom Air Force Base. In 1977 the name was shortened to the present Hanscom Air Force Base.

The base saw a second wave of construction during the 1980s. The Electronic Systems Division put up four new systems management engineering facilities (the O'Neill, Brown, Shiely and Bond buildings). For base personnel, there were new service facilities—medical, youth and family support centers—as well as additional housing and a temporary lodging facility.

=== Post Cold War ===
Since July 1992, Hanscom and the Electronic Systems Center (ESC) have been part of the Air Force Materiel Command. In 1994 the Air Force designated ESC as the Air Force Center of Excellence for Command, Control, Communications, Computers and Intelligence (C4I). The 3245th Air Base Group was redesignated the 647th Support Group on 1 October 1992, and then the 647th Air Base Group (647th ABG) on 1 October 1993. The 647th ABG was then inactivated on 1 October 1994, and its mission taken up by the 66th Air Base Wing.

The Standard Systems Group at Gunter Annex, Maxwell AFB, Ala.; the 38th Engineering Installation Wing at Tinker AFB, Okla.; the Materiel Systems Group at Wright-Patterson AFB, Ohio; and lastly the Cryptologic Systems Group at Kelly AFB, Texas; were all attached to ESC between 1993 and 1996 in order to consolidate related functions in AFMC under the center, and to support its expanded mission. Subsequent reorganizations changed the groupings, but all the above organizations (though renamed) except the 38th EIW remained under Hanscom's reporting chain.

In 2004, ESC was reorganized into a named wing, group and squadron unit, to better reflect the organization of the Air Force as a whole. In 2006, the wings, groups and squadrons were given numbered designations. In 2010, ESC reverted to an organization of program offices and the 38th Engineering Installation Wing (by then a group) was reassigned. New Air Force standards caused the 66th Air Base Wing, because of its size, to be redesignated the 66th Air Base Group.

In June 2011, the Air Force Research Laboratory Sensors Directorate moved from Hanscom to Wright-Patterson AFB, Ohio, and the Space Vehicles Directorate moved to Kirtland Air Force Base, New Mexico, closing more than 60 years of laboratory presence on Hanscom.

The Electronic Systems Center as an organization was realigned in July 2012, and became a part of the newly created Air Force Life Cycle Management Center at Wright-Patterson AFB, Ohio.

=== Incidents/accidents ===
The B-25 bomber which crashed into the Empire State Building on 28 July 1945, took off from Hanscom.

On 8 August 1962, a US Air Force KC-135A tanker crashed on approach to runway 11, destroying the aircraft and killing all three members of the flight crew.

On June 30, 1964, a Massachusetts Air National Guard F-86 fighter from Hanscom crashed into a Haverhill, Massachusetts neighborhood killing 2 children.

=== Previous names ===
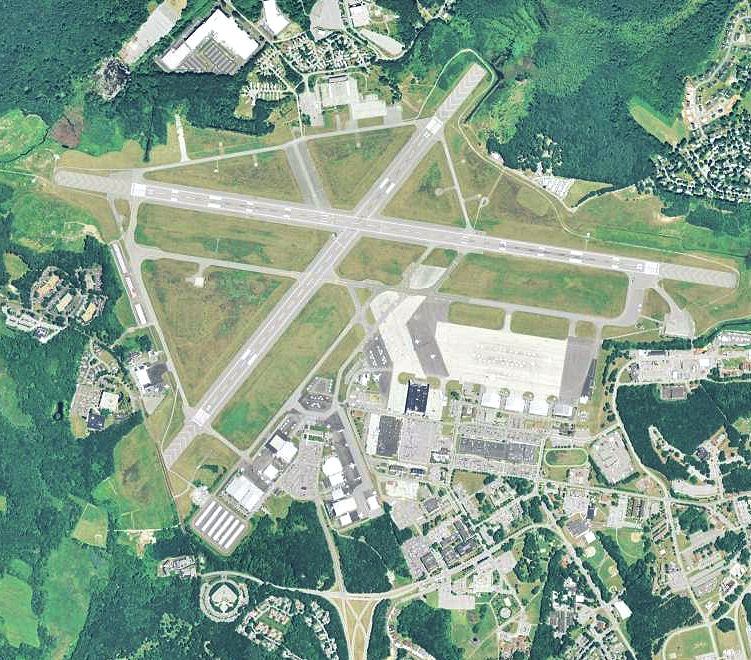
2006 USGS aerial photo of Hanscom Field, showing adjacent buildings comprising Hanscom AFB

- Laurence G. Hanscom Field, Boston Auxiliary Airport at Bedford, 26 Jun 1941
- Bedford Municipal Airport, 29 Jun 1942
- Bedford Army Air Field, 8 Apr 1943
- Hanscom Airport, 15 Oct 1947
- Bedford Air Field, Mar 1948
- Hanscom Field, Jun 1948
- Laurence G. Hanscom Field, 24 Dec 1952
- Laurence G. Hanscom Air Force Base, 22 Jun 1974-18 January 1977

=== Major commands to which assigned ===
- First Air Force, 2 July 1942
- AAF Technical Service Command, 15 October 1944

Re-designated: Air Technical Service Command, 1 July 1945-12 August 1945

- Air Defense Command, 1 July 1947
- Continental Air Command, 1 December 1948
- Air Defense Command, 1 January 1951
- Air Research and Development Command, 1 August 1951

Re-designated: Air Force Systems Command, 1 April 1961

- Air Force Materiel Command, 1 July 1992–present

Note: Station placed on standby status: 1 Jan-to Apr 1944; discontinued, 12 Aug 1945; disposed, 8 Mar 1946; transferred to Commonwealth of Massachusetts, 21 Aug 1946; leased from Commonwealth of Massachusetts to US Government, 1 Jul 1947, flying facilities are property of Commonwealth of Massachusetts with USAF not having exclusive use.

=== Major units assigned ===
- 79th Fighter Group, 2 July – 28 September 1942
- 318th Fighter Squadron, 3 August-3 October 1942
- 85th Fighter Squadron, 23 June-28 Sep 1942
- 342d Fighter Squadron, 13 January-28 April 1943
- 370th Fighter Squadron, 5 April-25 May 1943
- 6th Air Defense Wing, 22 June-4 August 1943
- 69th Fighter Squadron, 28 April-28 August 1943
- 311th Fighter Squadron, 27 August-15 September 1943
- 442d Fighter Squadron, 17 September-11 November 1943
- 4147th Army Air Force Base Unit, 15 October 1944 – 25 February 1946
- 3d Bombardment Wing
  Re-designated: 3d Air Division, 20 December 1946 – 27 June 1949
- 310th Bombardment Group**, 27 December 1946 – 27 June 1949
- 89th Troop Carrier Wing, 27 June 1949 – 10 May 1951
  Re-designated: 89th Fighter-Bomber Wing, 14 June 1952 – 16 November 1957
- 6520th Air Base Group
  Re-designated: 3246th Air Base Group, 18 October 1951 – 1 March 1963
- 6250th Support Wing, 1 April 1952 – 1 July 1955
- AF Cambridge Research Center, 20 June 1955
  Re-designated: Air Force Geophysics Laboratory, 1 July 1960-
- 49th Fighter-Interceptor Squadron, 5 November 1955 – 1 July 1959
- 731st Troop Carrier Squadron, Medium, 16 November 1957 – 17 September 1973
- 94th Troop Carrier Wing**, 16 November 1957 – 1 July 1972
- Air Materiel Command Electronic Systems Center, 2 November 1959 – 1 April 1961
- Electronic Systems Division, 1 April 1961
  Re-designated: Electronic Systems Center, 1 July 1992
  Re-designated: Air Force Life Cycle Management Center, 16 July 2012 – Present
- 901st Troop Carrier Group**, 11 February 1963 – 17 September 1973
- Air Force Computer Acquisition Center, 1 July 1976 – Present
  - Note: Air Force Reserve units. Active flying at Hanscom ended on 30 September 1973.

== Role and operations ==
=== Air Force Life Cycle Management Center ===
The Air Force Life Cycle Management Center is the single center responsible for total life cycle management of Air Force weapon systems

=== 66th Air Base Group ===
The 66th Air Base Group performs host unit functions of the base, supporting the Air Force Life Cycle Management Center.

=== Other units ===
Hanscom also supports the Massachusetts National Guard Joint Force Headquarters, Massachusetts Wing Civil Air Patrol, MIT Lincoln Laboratory and MITRE Federally Funded Research and Development Centers, and various other companies and groups related to the Department of Defense.

== Based units ==
Flying and notable non-flying units based at Hanscom Air Force Base.

Units marked GSU are Geographically Separate Units, which although based at Hanscom, are subordinate to a parent unit based at another location.

=== United States Air Force ===
Air Force Materiel Command (AFMC)

- Air Force Life Cycle Management Center (GSU)
  - Battle Management Programme Executive Office
  - Command, Control, Communications, Intelligence and Networks (C3I&N) Programme Executive Office
  - Nuclear Command, Control and Communications (NC3) Programme Executive Office
- 66th Air Base Group
  - 66th Force Support Squadron
  - 66th Medical Squadron
  - 66th Security Forces Squadron
- Air Force Recruiting Service
  - 319th Recruiting Squadron

=== Massachusetts National Guard ===
- Massachusetts Army and Air Force Joint Force Headquarters-Massachusetts

== Education ==
Hanscom School, the on-post K-8 school, is operated by the Lincoln School District. High school students who are dependents of active duty military personnel are sent to Bedford High School of the Bedford School District. The base has an agreement with Bedford School District to educate high school students. High school students living on the base who are not dependents of active duty military personnel are sent to Lincoln-Sudbury Regional High School of the Lincoln-Sudbury Regional School District.

The census-designated place is physically divided between the following school districts: Lincoln School District (elementary) and Lincoln-Sudbury School District (secondary) in the part in Lincoln Town, and Bedford School District for the part in Bedford Town.

== See also ==
- List of military installations in Massachusetts
- List of United States Air Force installations
- Massachusetts World War II Army Airfields
