= Massachusetts Wing Civil Air Patrol =

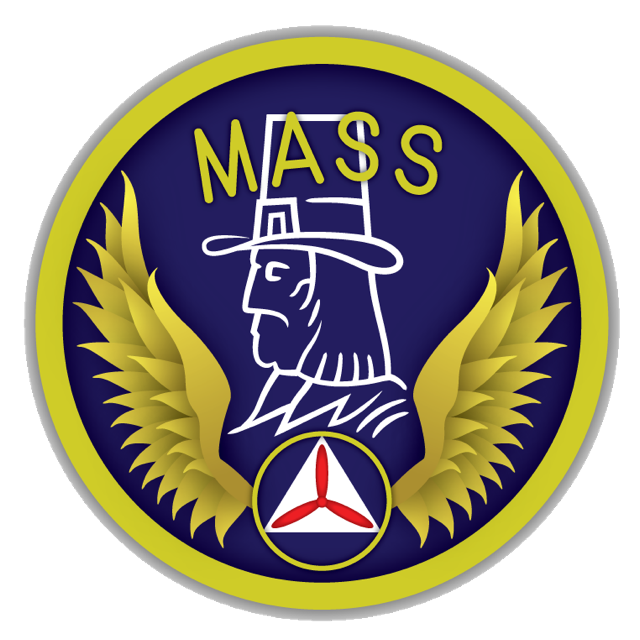
- Massachusetts Wing of Civil Air Patrol

Associated branches
- United States Air Force

Command staff
- Commander: Col Carleton Jones, CAP
- Deputy Commander: Lt Col Claire Belden, CAP
- Chief of Staff: Maj Charles Dale, CAP

Current statistics
- Cadets: 389
- Seniors: 383
- Total Membership: 772
- Website: mawg.cap.gov
- Statistics as of October 2024

The Massachusetts Wing Civil Air Patrol (abbreviated MAWG), commonly referred to as "Mass Wing", is the highest echelon of Civil Air Patrol (CAP) in the Commonwealth of Massachusetts. Its headquarters is located at Hanscom Air Force Base in Bedford, Massachusetts. MA Wing reports to Northeast Region CAP, which reports to CAP National Headquarters.

== Emergency services ==
Training for all Emergency Services functions is based on the Incident Command System. The most basic qualifications require certification in the ICS-100 course available online.

Members of the wing assisted in the search for John F. Kennedy Jr.'s plane crash site. A few Massachusetts Wing members aided with Incident Command at the Gulf Oil Spill Disaster. More recently, several Massachusetts Wing members participated as members of CAP's Geospatial Team by performing damage assessments after Hurricanes Helene and Milton.

In April 2020, members of the Massachusetts Wing began assisting the Massachusetts Emergency Management Agency (MEMA) in its response to the COVID-19 pandemic by helping to load and unload trucks, inventorying personal protective equipment and other needed medical supplies, and assembling orders of those items for delivery to local municipalities around the state.

== Squadrons ==
There are currently 11 local area Squadrons in the Massachusetts Wing.

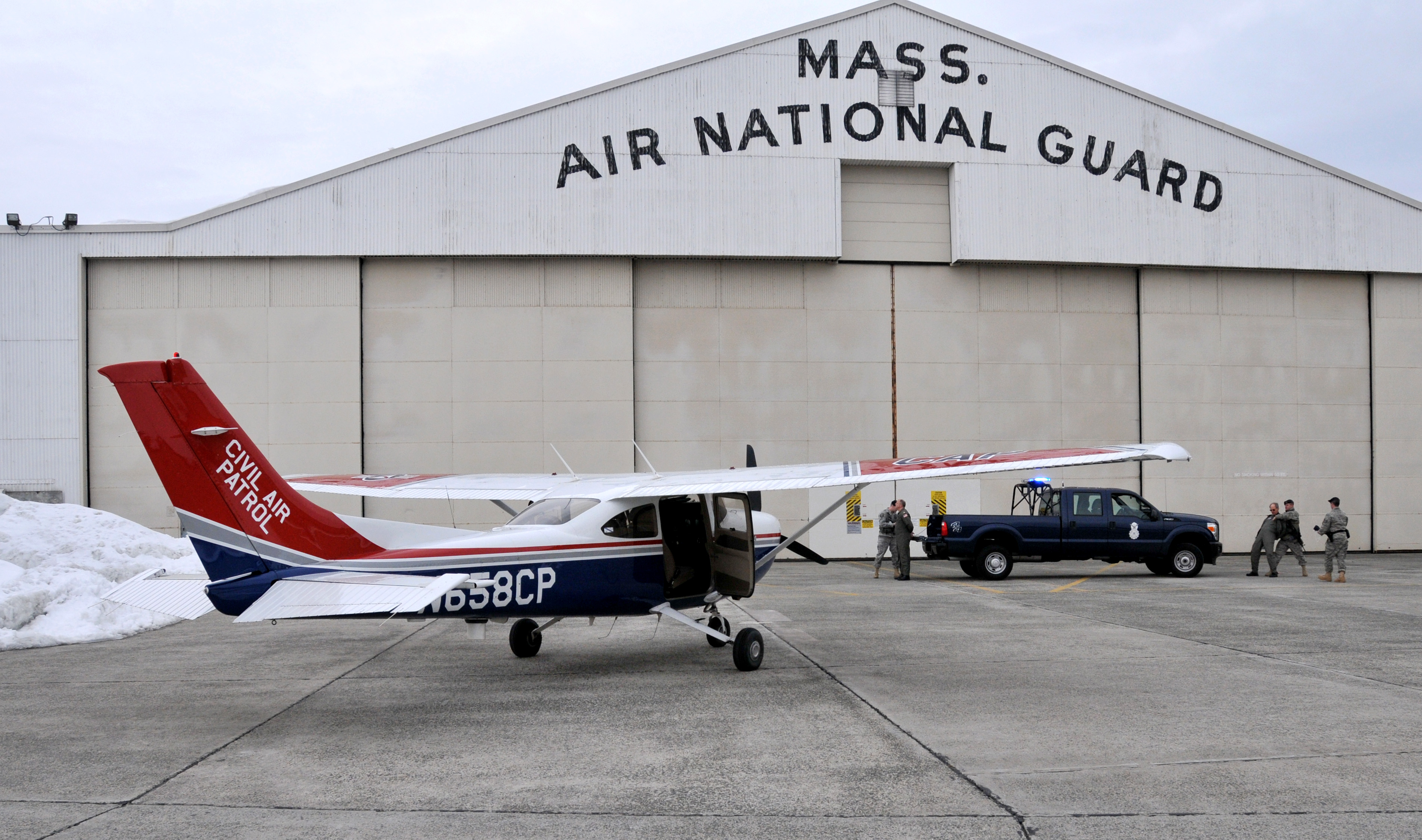
Members of the Massachusetts Wing support the Massachusetts Air National Guard during an intercept training missions. The story was featured in the Smithsonian Channel documentary On the Fly: Adventures at Altitude. S1E8 - "A Game of Cat and Mouse"

- Beverly Composite Squadron MA-019
- Boston Cadet Squadron MA-002
- Bridgewater State University Squadron MA-005
- Coastal Patrol 18 Composite Squadron MA-044
- Essex County Composite Squadron MA-070
- Brigadier General Arthur J. Pierce Squadron MA-013
- Goddard Cadet Squadron MA-007
- Hanscom Composite Squadron MA-043
- Pilgrim Composite Squadron MA-071
- Westover Composite Squadron MA-015
- Worcester Cadet Squadron MA-022
