= 66th Air Base Group =

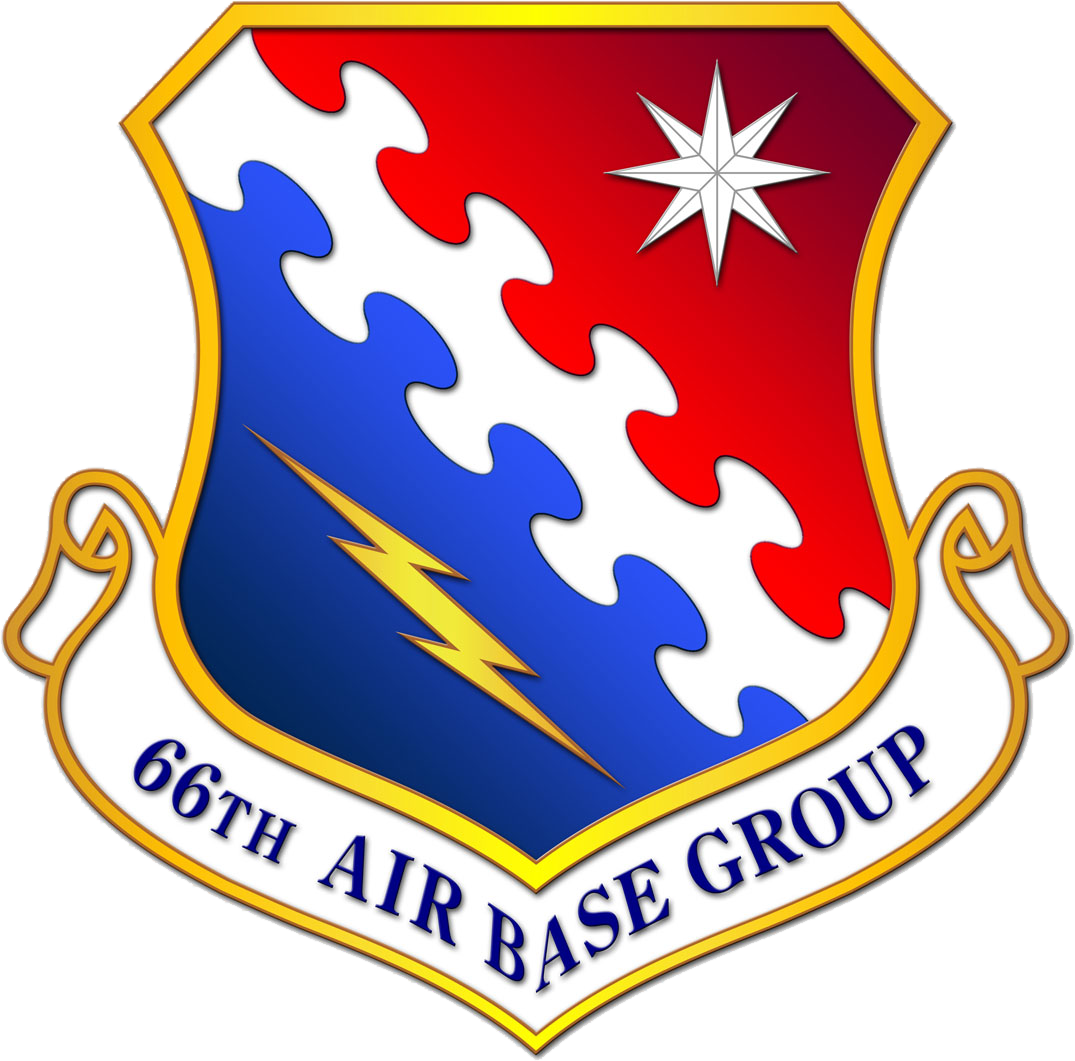
- Emblem of the 66th Air Base Group
- Active: 1941–1957, 2010–present
- Country: United States
- Branch: United States Air Force

The 66th Air Base Group is a non-flying United States Air Force unit assigned to the Air Force Materiel Command Electronic Systems Center. It is stationed at Hanscom Air Force Base, Massachusetts. The group is also the host unit at Hanscom Air Force Base.

The 66th ABG provide services to over 5,000 active duty, Reserve and National Guard military personnel and DoD civilians who work and live at Hanscom Air Force Base. Additionally, the 66 ABG supports over 100,000 retired military personnel, annuitants and spouses living in the six-state New England area and New York.

== Overview ==
Activated as an Air Base Group in 1940, Redesignated as a Service Group on 13 June 1942. Disbanded on 1 February 1944. It was reactivated and Consolidated with the 66th Air Base Group / 66th Combat Support Group / 66th Mission Support Group in October 2010 at Hanscom, when the 66th Air Base Wing was inactivated.

The 66th ABG consists of the following:

- 66th Security Forces Squadron
- 66th Force Support Squadron
- 66th Medical Squadron

== History ==
For additional lineage and history, see 66th Air Base Wing

Stations: Maxwell Field, AL, 1 September 1940; Montgomery Airport, AL, 3 October 1940; Santa Maria-Lompoc AAB, CA, 9 February 1943; Barksdale Field, LA, 2 May 1943 – 1 Feb 1944.

== Lineage ==
66th Service Group

- Constituted as the 66th Air Base Group (Special) on 16 August 1940

Activated on 1 September 1940
Redesignated 66th Service Group on 13 June 1942
Disbanded on 1 February 1944

- Reconstituted and consolidated with the 66th Mission Support Group as the 66th Air Base Group on 30 June 2010

66th Air Base Group

- Constituted as the 66th Air Base Group on 15 November 1952

Activated on 1 January 1953
Redesignated 66th Combat Support Group on 15 August 1962
Inactivated on 1 October 1970

- Activated on 1 June 1985

Inactivated on 31 March 1992

- Redesignated 66th Support Group on 16 September 1994

Activated on 1 October 1994
Redesignated 66th Mission Support Group on 1 October 2002

- Consolidated with the 66th Service Group on 30 June 2010 and redesignated 66th Air Base Group

=== Assignments ===
- Office of the Chief of Air Corps, 1 September 1940
- Mobile Air Depot Control Area Command, 1 April 1943
- San Antonio Air Service Command, 1 June 1943 – 1 February 1944
- 66th Tactical Reconnaissance Wing, 1 January 1953
- Third Air Force, 1 April 1970
- 10th Tactical Reconnaissance Wing, 1 July 1970 – 1 October 1970
- 66th Electronic Combat Wing, 1 June 1985 – 31 March 1992
- 66th Air Base Wing, 1 October 1994
- Electronic Systems Center, 30 June 2010 – 1 October 2012 (attached to Air Force Life Cycle Management Center after 16 July 2012)
- Air Force Life Cycle Management Center, 1 October 2012 – present

=== Stations ===
- Maxwell Field, Alabama, 1 September 1940
- Montgomery Airport, Alabama, 3 October 1940
- Santa Maria Army Air Field, California, 9 February 1943
- Barksdale Field, Louisiana, 2 May 1943 – 1 February 1944
- Shaw Air Force Base, South Carolina, 1 January 1953 – 25 June 1953
- Sembach Air Base, Germany, 7 July 1953
- Laon Air Base, France, 18 June 1958
- RAF Upper Heyford, England, 1 September 1966
- RAF Wethersfield, England, 1 April 1970 – 1 October 1970
- Sembach Air Base, Germany, 1 June 1985 – 31 March 1992
- Hanscom Air Force Base, Massachusetts, 1 Oct 1994–present

=== Aircraft ===
No Aircraft Assigned
