= Enola =

Enola may refer to:

== Places ==
- Enola, Arkansas, USA; a town
- Enola, Nebraska, USA; an unincorporated community
- Enola, Pennsylvania, USA; a census-designated place
- Enola Reef (island), a coral atoll in the Spratley Islands
- Mount Vernon–Enola School District, Arkansas, USA; a public school board and district

=== Facilities and structures ===
- Enola Branch, a railroad segment in Pennsylvania, USA
- Enola Low Grade Trail, a wilderness trail in Pennsylvania, USA
- Enola Post Office, a former Post Office in Chambersburg Township, North Carolina, USA
- Enola Yard, rail yard in East Pennsboro Township, Pennsylvania, USA
- Mount Vernon–Enola High School, Mount Vernon, Arkansas, USA; a comprehensive 6-year public secondary school

== People ==
- Enola (given name), the history and usage of the given name
- Black Fox, also called Enola, a Cherokee chief
- Enola Gay Tibbets, namesake of the WWII Hiroshima nuclear bomber Enola Gay
- Enola Maxwell (1919–2003), American civil rights activist, minister, and community leader
- Constance Enola Morgan (1935-1996), female baseball player

=== Fictional characters ===
- Enola, fictional character in the 1995 US film Waterworld
- Enola Holmes, fictional protagonist, sister of Sherlock and Mycroft, created by the U.S. author Nancy Springer in 2006

== Entertainment and media ==
=== Literature ===
- Enola; Or, Her Fatal Mistake, 1886 novel by Mary Young Ridenbaugh, namesake of Enola Gay Tibbets
- ENOLA, a Romanian magazine for lesbian and bisexual women, published since 2006

=== Music ===
- "Enola Gay" (song), a song by Orchestral Manoeuvres in the Dark about the WWII Hiroshima nuclear bomber
- Enola (album), an album from the band I Can Make a Mess Like Nobody's Business, released 2013
- Enola (Seigmen album), an album from the Norwegian alternative rock band Seigmen, released 2015
- Electronic Tragedy: Enola (album), a 1997 album by P-Model
- Enola/Alone, a song from the album Everything Must Go by Manic Street Preachers

== Other uses ==
- Enola Gay, the aircraft that dropped the world's first atomic bomb, on Hiroshima, Japan, in 1945
- Enola bean, a variety of Mexican yellow bean

== See also ==
- Enola Gay (disambiguation)
- Enola earthquake swarm, in Arkansas, USA, in 2010
- Ebola (disambiguation)
- Alone (disambiguation)
