= Enola Gay (disambiguation) =

The Enola Gay is a USAAF B-29 Superfortress, that dropped "Little Boy", the first atomic bomb used in warfare, on Hiroshima in Japan during WWII.

Enola Gay may also refer to:

== People ==
- Enola Gay Tibbets, namesake of the WWII nuclear bomber
- Enola Gay Gilmore, wife of U.S. basketball player Artis Gilmore

=== Fictional characters ===
- Enola Gay (fictional character), a character from the 1989 Martin Amis novel London Fields

== Places ==
- Enola Gay Hangar, an aircraft hangar at Wendover Air Force Base, Utah, USA
- Steven F. Udvar-Hazy Center, where the Enola Gay is on display, Virginia, USA

== Music ==
=== Songs ===
- "Enola Gay" (song), a 1980 anti-war song by Orchestral Manoeuvres in the Dark
- "Enola Gay" (2008 song), an anti-war song by Sugizo
- "Enola Gay", a song about the United States' WWII atomic bomb attacks on Japan by folksinger Utah Phillips
- "(Enola Gay) Drop The Bomb", a song by Grave Digger, from the 1986 album War Games

=== Artists ===
- Enola Gay (band) a noise punk band formed in Belfast in 2019

== Other uses ==
- Enola Gay: The Men, the Mission, the Atomic Bomb (film), a 1980 telemovie about the dropping of the Little Boy atomic bomb on Hiroshima
- Enola Gay (book), a book by Gordon Thomas & Max Morgan Witts, that was condensed and republished in 1977 by Reader's Digest in the Reader's Digest Condensed Books
- Enola Gay (fictional bombers), the driving plot point of the 2006 film Yo-Yo Girl Cop
- Enola Gay (horse), a racehorse that set a speed record in winning the 2020 Appalachian Stakes

== See also ==
- "Flight of the Enola Gay" (1990 song), a song by Blue Cheer off the album Highlights and Lowlives
- Bockscar, the B-29 that dropped the Fat Man atomic bomb onto Nagasaki in WWII
- Manhattan Project (disambiguation)
- Little Boy (disambiguation)
- Fat Man (disambiguation)
- Boxcar (disambiguation)
- Enola (disambiguation)
- Gay (disambiguation)
