= Enola (given name) =

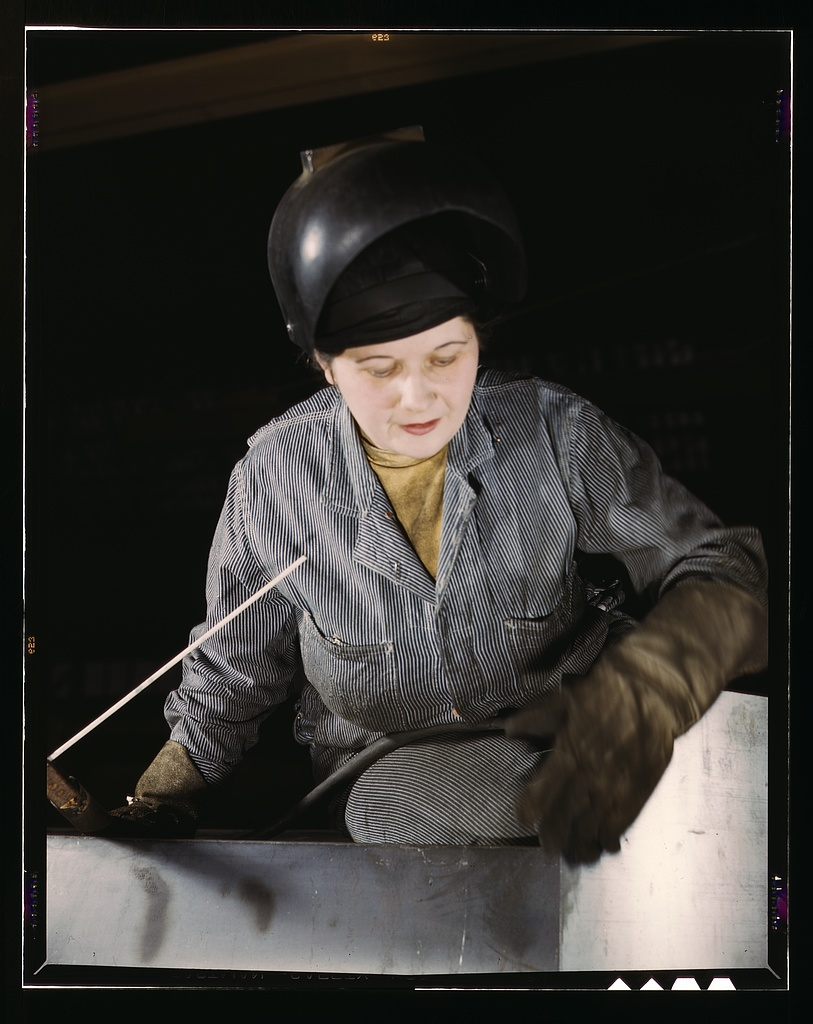
- Enola O'Connell, a 32-year-old housewife turned welder at Heil and Co., Milwaukee, Wisconsin, in February 1943. This "Rosie the Riveter" was one of a number of American bearers of the name in the late 19th and early 20th centuries.
- Gender: Feminine
- Language: English

Origin
- Meaning: Alone spelled backwards

Other names
- Related names: Anola, Enoli, Inola

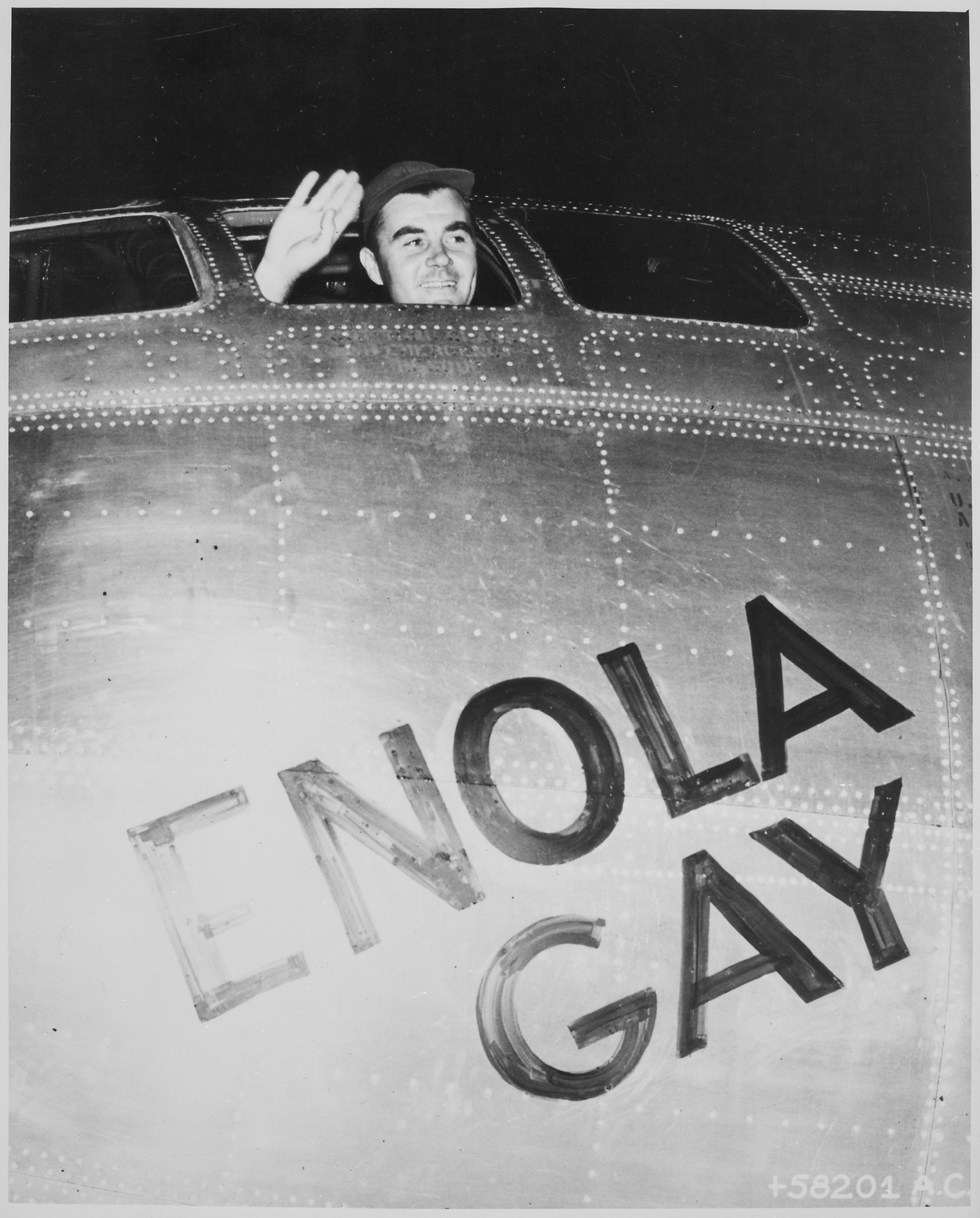
Col. Paul Tibbets in the Enola Gay, the bomber he named after his mother

Enola is an English feminine given name often taken from the English word alone spelled backwards. It is also an English spelling of a Cherokee name meaning black fox.

== Origins ==
It is known as the name of the Boeing B-29 Superfortress bomber Enola Gay, the first aircraft to drop an atomic bomb in warfare over Hiroshima, Japan on August 6, 1945. Pilot Paul Tibbets named the aircraft after his mother, Enola Gay Haggard Tibbets. His mother was said to have been named after a character in a novel that her father had been reading shortly before her birth in the American state of Iowa. The name was used in several popular novels in the mid-1800s. According to another story, Enola Gay Haggard Tibbets' mother learned of the name in connection to a story she heard in Iowa about wagon trains traveling west. She liked it so much she gave it to her daughter. Enola was a character in a popular 19th century novel, Dangers of Darkness. Enola Miller, after whom the town of Enola, Pennsylvania was named, was herself named after a cousin whose name was inspired by the popular novel in the 1860s. Several other towns in the United States, including Enola, Arkansas, Enola, North Carolina, and Enola Hill, Oregon were also called Enola, some because it is the word alone spelled backwards. Enola, Nebraska was named after a reversal of the last name of its founder, T.J. Malone, with the starting letter M omitted. The dime novel Enola; or The Rescue, a sequel to The Prairie Rangers, was published in New York in the 1860s by William H. Chaney. Enola, the English word alone spelled backwards, was the title of the 1886 novel Enola: or Her Fatal Mistake by American novelist Mary Young Ridenbaugh. The heroine of the novel, Enola Beatrice Baring, is left alone after she is deserted by her first husband and she loses her second husband, but eventually inherits a large fortune which changes her life for the better. Many American girls, like Enola Gay Tibbets, were named Enola Gay after the heroine of one of these popular romance novels. Other variants in use were Anola and Inola. The name, usually given as a reference to the word alone spelled backwards, was in use in the Victorian era along with other names connoting sadness or isolation. Author Nancy Springer, who was familiar with Enola, Pennsylvania, researched the history of the name and chose it for Enola Holmes, the heroine of her series of mystery novels.

== Usage ==
The name ranked among the top 1,000 names for American girls at different times between 1881 and 1926 and again in 1953. It increased in usage in the United States following the release of the 2020 Netflix film Enola Holmes and its 2022 sequel Enola Holmes 2, both of which were based on the mystery novels by Springer. The name has ranked among the top 500 names for girls in France between 1997 and 2023. It ranked among the 1,000 most popular names for girls born in England and Wales in 2021.

== As first name ==
- Enola Aird, American Protestant feminist activist
- Énola Bédard (born 2000), Canadian dancer
- Enola Maxwell (1919–2003), American civil rights activist
- Enola Gay Tibbets (1890–1960), American mother of Paul Tibbets and the namesake of the Enola Gay, the aircraft that dropped the first atomic bomb in warfare over Hiroshima, Japan on August 6, 1945

== As middle name ==
- Constance Enola "Connie" Morgan (1935–1996), American Negro League baseball player

== Fictional characters ==
- Enola, a fictional character in the 1995 film Waterworld
- Enola Holmes, the fictional little sister of Sherlock Holmes in the mystery series by Nancy Springer and three movie adaptations of the novels
- Enola Sciotti, a character in the 2015 gothic romance film Crimson Peak
- Enola Walker, a character in the video game Fallout 76

== See also ==
- Black Fox, also called Enola, a Cherokee chief
