= Big Stink =

Big Stink may refer to:

- Big Stink (aircraft), a Boeing B-29 Superfortress bomber (Victor number 90) that participated in the atomic bomb attack on Nagasaki, Japan on August 9, 1945
- The Great Stink, or the Big Stink, was a time in the summer of 1858 during which the smell of untreated human waste was very strong in central London.
- Big Stink was a concert series in Portland, Oregon put on by 's 94.7 KNRK
