= Operations Order No. 35 =

Order authorizing atomic bombing of Hiroshima, Japan

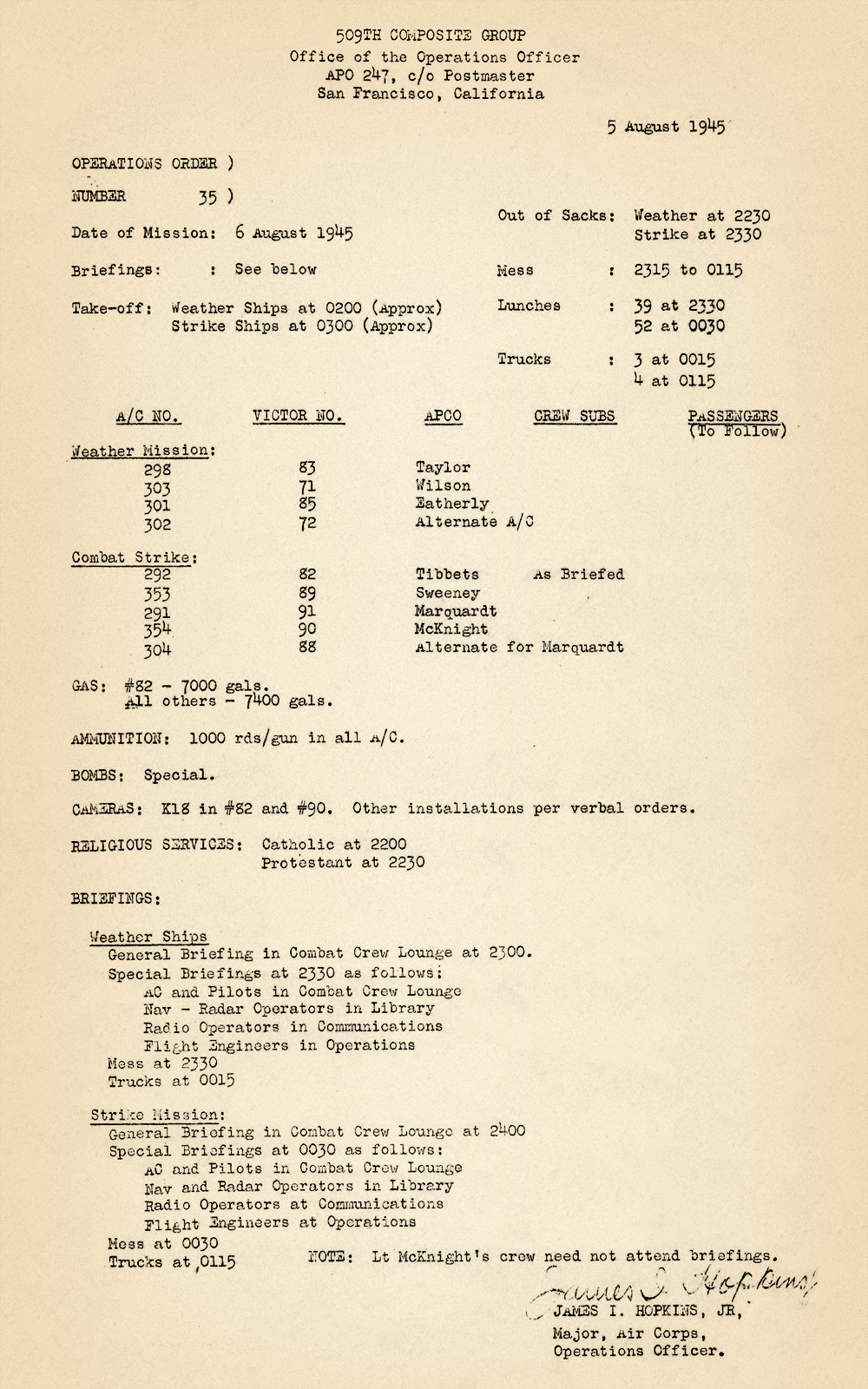

Operations Order No. 35 was an order issued by the 509th Composite Group on August 5, 1945 for the atomic bombing mission on Hiroshima, Japan, during World War II. The order was signed by Operations Officer Major James I. Hopkins, Jr. who would later fly Big Stink in the August 9, 1945 atomic bombing raid on Nagasaki, Japan, under the call sign "Dimples 90".

== History ==
Pursuant to the terms of Operations Order No. 35, at 02:45 on August 6, 1945, the Enola Gay, a Boeing B-29 Superfortress bomber, departed North Field, Tinian, for Hiroshima, Japan, with Colonel Paul W. Tibbets, Jr. at the controls. Tinian was approximately 2,000 miles (3,200 km) away from Japan, so it took six hours to reach the target at Hiroshima.

The Little Boy atomic bomb was dropped over Hiroshima at 08:15 local time. Tibbets recalled that a tall mushroom cloud covered the city after the bomb was dropped.

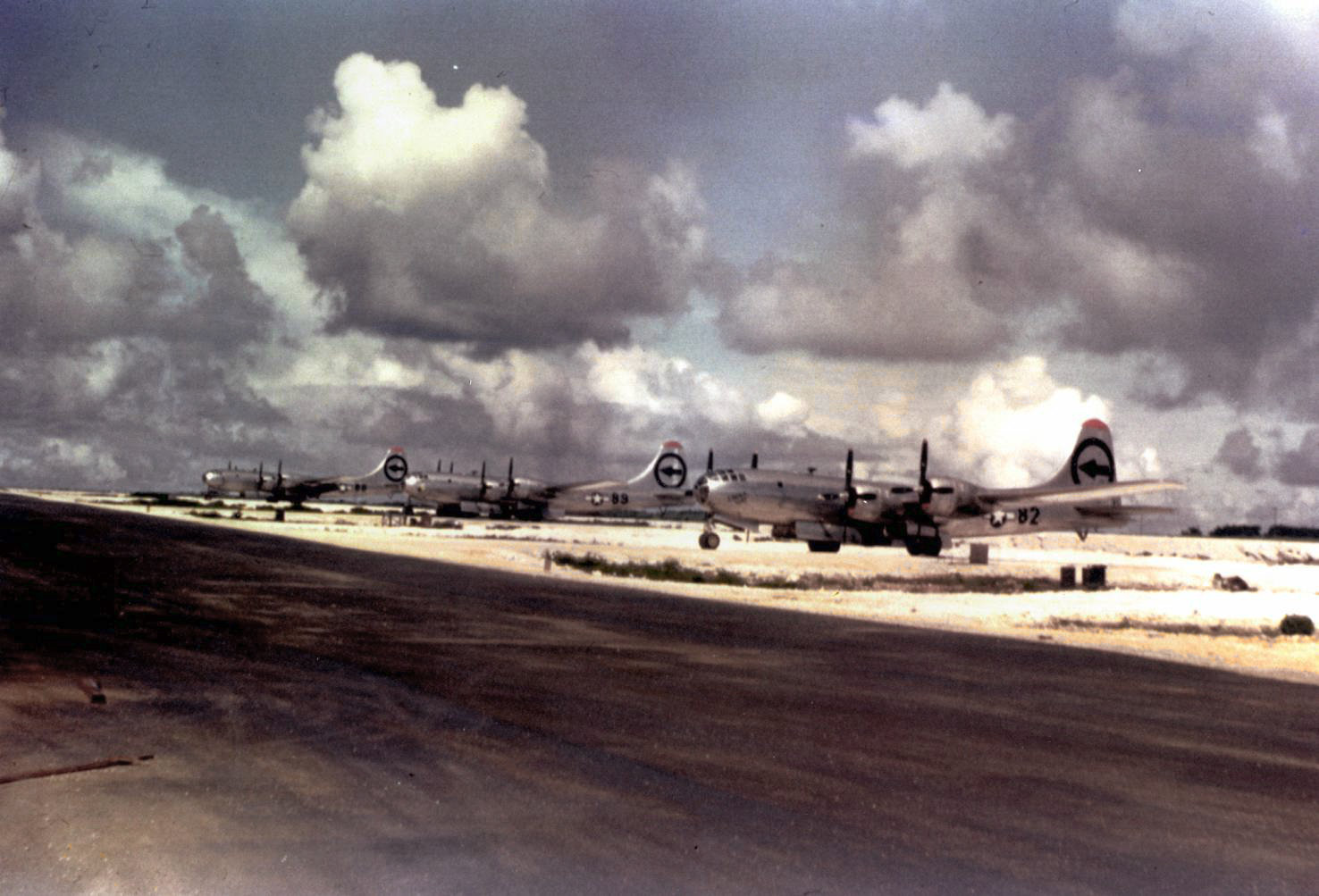
Aircraft of the 509th Composite Group, two of which took part in the Hiroshima bombing (left to right: ^{†}Big Stink, The Great Artiste, Enola Gay).

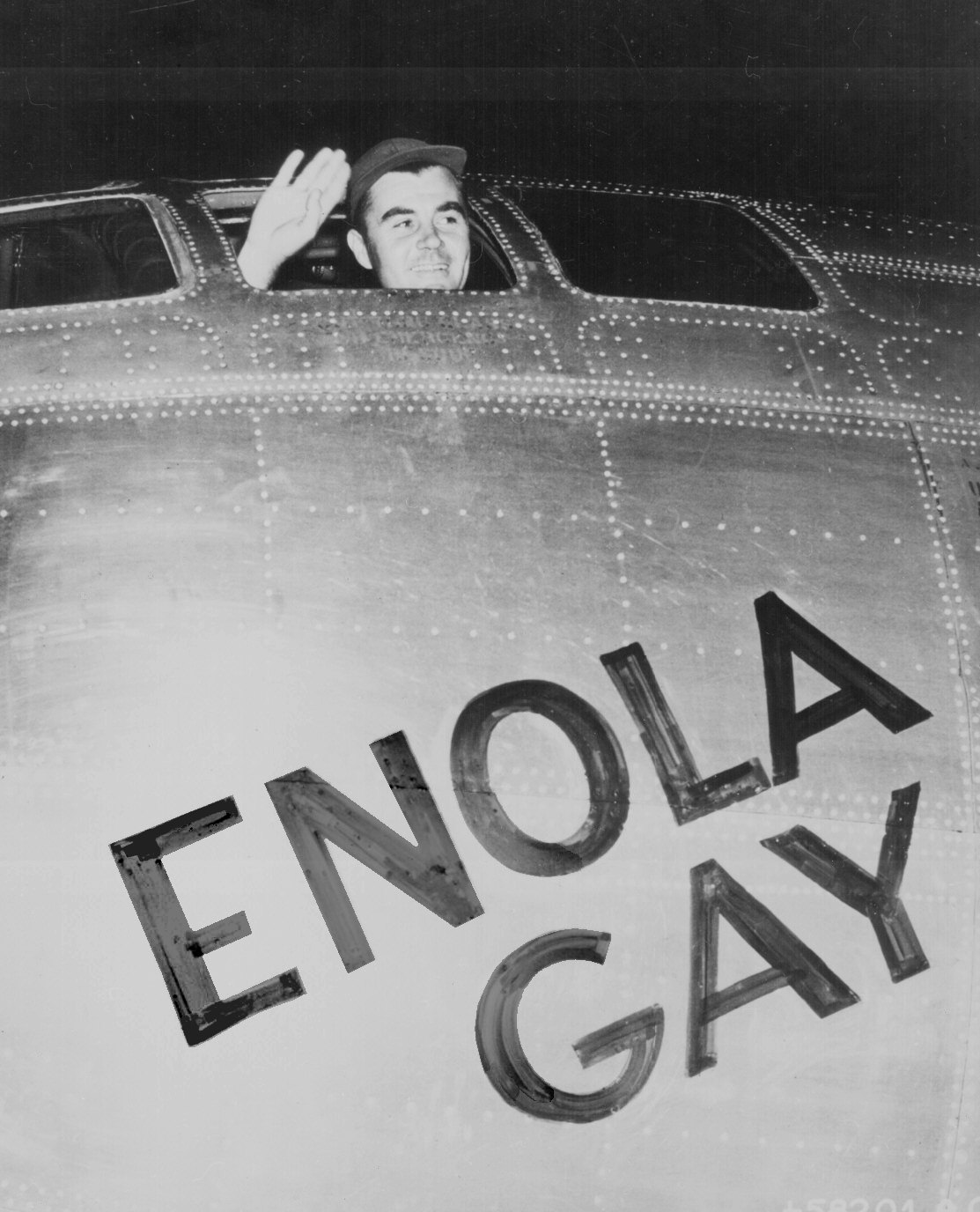
Tibbets waves from the cockpit of the Enola Gay

== Comments ==
^{†} Big Stink was a backup aircraft for the Hiroshima bombing; it was used for strike observation and photographic purposes for the Nagasaki bombing.
