= 1951 Atlantic C-124 disappearance =

Disappearance of a Douglas C-124 Globemaster II

Coordinates: 50.7500°N 24.0500°W

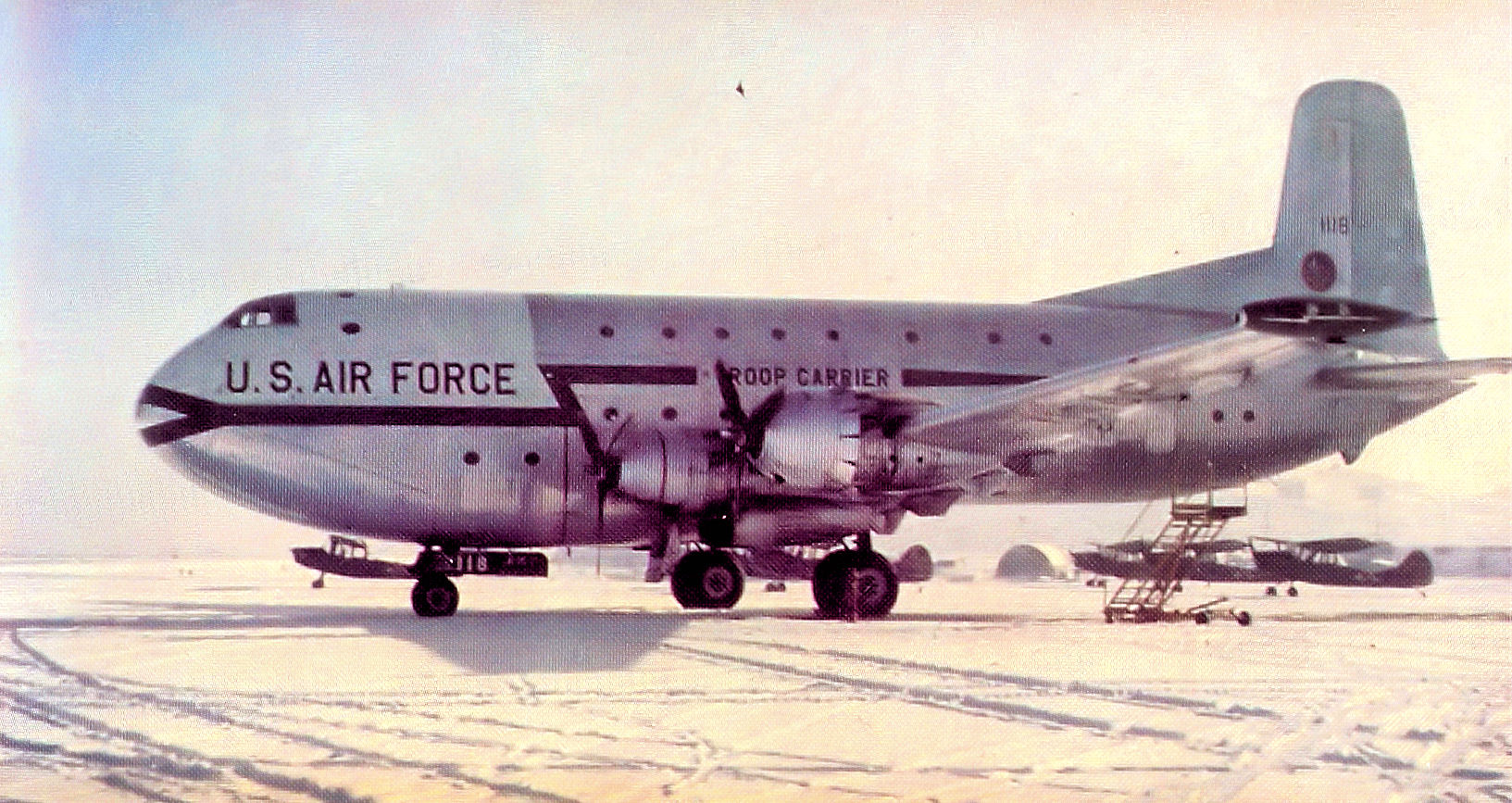
- A C-124A similar to the aircraft that disappeared

Accident
- Date: March 23, 1951
- Summary: Controlled ditching due to in-flight fire; unexplained disappearance
- Site: Atlantic Ocean, 725 km (453.1 miles) west of Shannon, Ireland

Aircraft
- Aircraft type: Douglas C-124A Globemaster II
- Operator: United States Air Force
- Registration: 49-0244
- Flight origin: Walker Air Force Base, Roswell, New Mexico, U.S.
- Stopover: Limestone Air Force Base, Limestone, Maine, U.S.
- Destination: RAF Station Mildenhall, Suffolk, England, U.K.
- Occupants: 53
- Passengers: 44
- Crew: 9
- Fatalities: Unknown, presumed to be 53
- Injuries: Unknown
- Missing: 53
- Survivors: Unknown, presumed to be 0

The 1951 Atlantic C-124 disappearance involved a Douglas C-124 Globemaster II of the 2nd Strategic Support Squadron, Strategic Air Command, which ditched into the Atlantic Ocean on the late afternoon of 23 March 1951 after reporting a fire in the cargo hold. The ditching and subsequent evacuation were successful, but the aircraft and its occupants had vanished by the time US Coast Guard Cutter Casco arrived at the last reported location.

== Flight ==
The transport was on a military flight from Walker Air Force Base in Roswell, New Mexico, to RAF Mildenhall in Suffolk, England, with a stopover at Limestone Air Force Base in Limestone, Maine. It was commanded by Major Robert S. Bell, of the Second Strategic Support Squadron. At 1300 hours on 23 March 1951, the aircraft radioed "Mayday" to weather ship USCGC Casco, reporting a fire in the cargo crates. The radio call gave their position as 51 degrees 30 minutes North, 27 degrees 05 minutes West, according to the logbook of Casco. Unable to extinguish the fire, Major Bell made the decision to ditch while there was still daylight. The exact ditching position of 50 degrees 22 minutes North, 22 degrees 20 minutes West was radioed to Casco. The aircraft landed safely and intact in the water. All hands then donned life preservers and climbed into inflatable 5-man rafts equipped with numerous survival supplies, including food, water, signal flares, cold-weather gear, and "Gibson Girl" hand crank emergency radios.

A Boeing B-29 Superfortress from the 509th Bomb Wing Detachment was en-route from RAF Lakenheath with the intention of joining up with the stricken aircraft and escorting it to the nearest landing site. When the B-29 arrived at the ditching position, the crew saw flares and located the survivors. After the location was reported, the B-29 circled for a time but had to return to base after reaching its minimum fuel required for safe landing. When Casco arrived at the ditching point on 24 March, the aircraft and the men had disappeared. Casco was later joined by British planes, weather ships, a submarine, and several warships, including the USS Coral Sea, which arrived at the crash site over 19 hours later, on Sunday, 25 March. All that was found was charred plywood and a briefcase. No human remains were found. The fate of the crashed C-124 and its 53 occupants remains undetermined. James Hopkins, Jr., who had been the aircraft commander on Big Stink (the third aircraft on the August 1945 Nagasaki atomic bombing mission), was among those on board.

== Investigation ==
A copy of the Air Force official report into the crash was provided to the Shreveport Times in 2011 via a Freedom of Information Act request. According to the accident report, "The aircraft was evidently, more or less, intact when it hit. This is indicated by the small number of pieces recovered, as well as the fact that two inflated aircraft tires carried as part of the cargo were never found. Also, the debris found was burned by fuel fire from fuel in the wing fuel cells, which indicates that the wing fuel cells were still attached to the fuselage. There is no conclusive proof that anything unusual happened before the aircraft struck the water, not that it struck the water out of control. There is evidence that a fire occurred on top of the water after the aircraft hit." Included in the report are over a dozen pages of debris analysis by the airplane's manufacturer, Douglas Aircraft Company.

=== Possible Soviet involvement ===
The passengers included Brig. Gen. Paul Thomas Cullen, vice commander of 2nd Air Force and commander of 7th Air Division, and other senior officers. Soviet vessels were active in the area. This fact, combined with the possibility of sabotage, the strategic value of the passengers, the potential distressed note recovered, and the knowledge that the evacuation from the airplane into safety rafts was a success has led some to speculate on potential Soviet involvement.

== Memorials ==
In 2012, more than 50 years after the disappearance of all personnel on board the plane, two men from the crash were memorialized with cenotaphs at Arlington National Cemetery.

== See also ==
- 1950 Douglas C-54D disappearance
- 1956 Atlantic R6D-1 disappearance
- Flying Tiger Line Flight 739
