= James I. Hopkins Jr. =

US Air Force officer (1918–c. 1951)

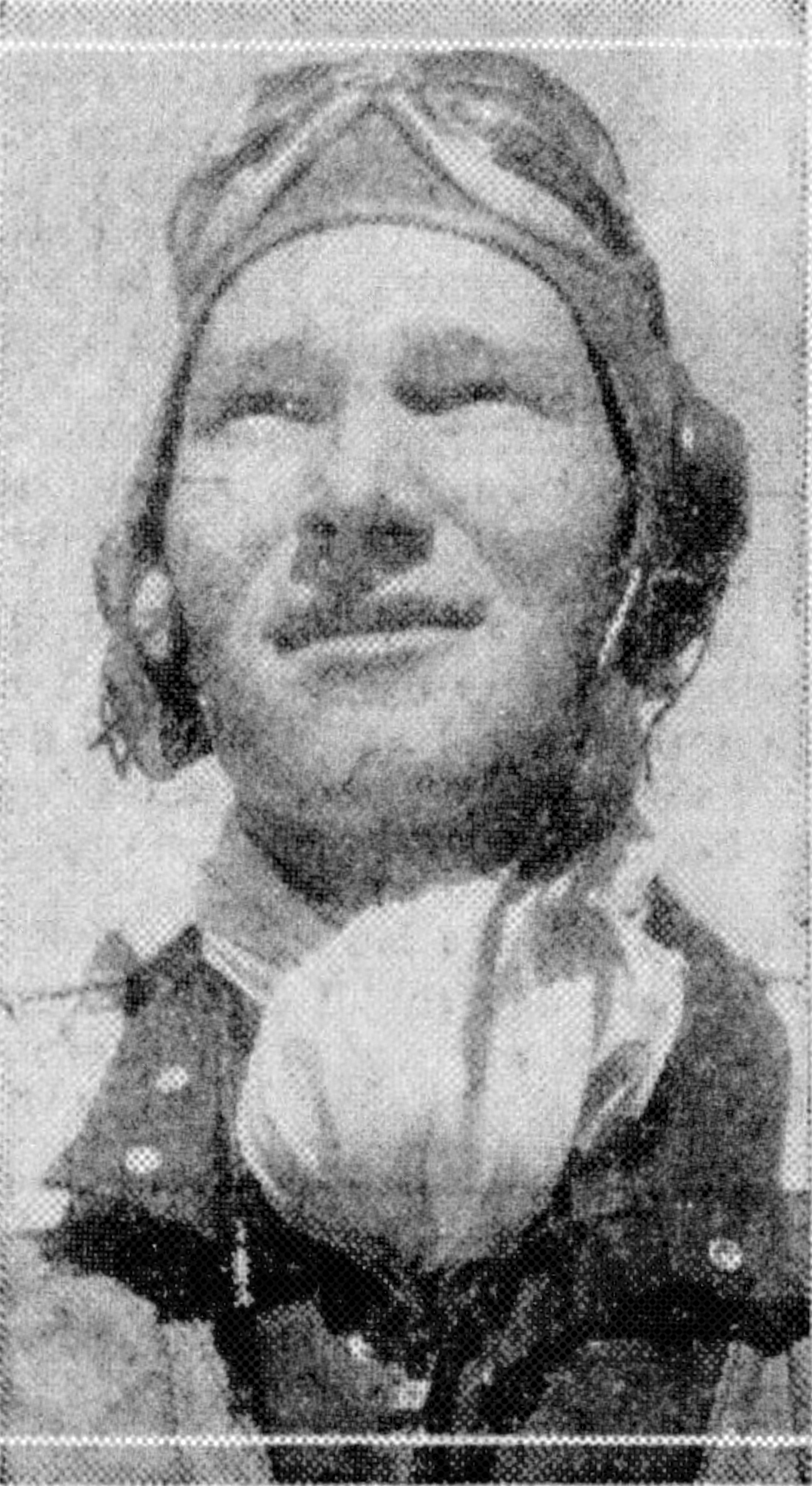
- Hopkins in 1940
- Born: James Iredell Hopkins Jr. December 4, 1918; Palestine, Texas, U.S.
- Disappeared: March 23, 1951 (aged 32); Atlantic Ocean
- Status: Presumed dead
- Spouse: Catherine Mary Williamson (m. 1941)
- Military career
- Allegiance: United States
- Branch: United States Army; Army Air Corps; Army Air Forces; United States Air Force
- Service years: 1940–1951
- Rank: Lieutenant Colonel
- Units: 509th Composite Group; Strategic Air Command
- Conflicts: World War II; North African campaign; Atomic bombings of Hiroshima and Nagasaki

James Iredell Hopkins Jr. (December 4, 1918 – lost at sea March 23, 1951) was a lieutenant colonel in the United States Air Force. During World War II, as a major in the United States Army Air Forces, he served as the operations officer of the 509th Composite Group. He is best known for signing Operations Order No. 35, the document authorizing the atomic bombing of Hiroshima, and for commanding the camera aircraft Big Stink during the atomic bombing of Nagasaki.

Hopkins disappeared on March 23, 1951, when the Douglas C-124 Globemaster II he was traveling in vanished over the Atlantic Ocean following a fire and successful ditching.

== Early life ==
Hopkins was born in Palestine, Texas, on December 4, 1918. He attended Texas A&M University for three years before enlisting in the United States Army Air Corps aviation cadet program, in which he trained from June 1940 to February 1941. He married Catherine Mary Williamson in Anderson, Texas, on February 15, 1941. His son, James K. Hopkins, later became a professor of history at Southern Methodist University.

== Military career ==
=== World War II ===
Hopkins initially served in the North African campaign, where he completed 43 combat missions. He was subsequently assigned to the 509th Composite Group, the unit tasked with deploying nuclear weapons, where he served as the operations officer. At the time of the atomic missions, he held the rank of major. On August 5, 1945, Hopkins signed Operations Order No. 35, which directed the mission details for the dropping of a Little Boy atomic bomb on Hiroshima the following day.

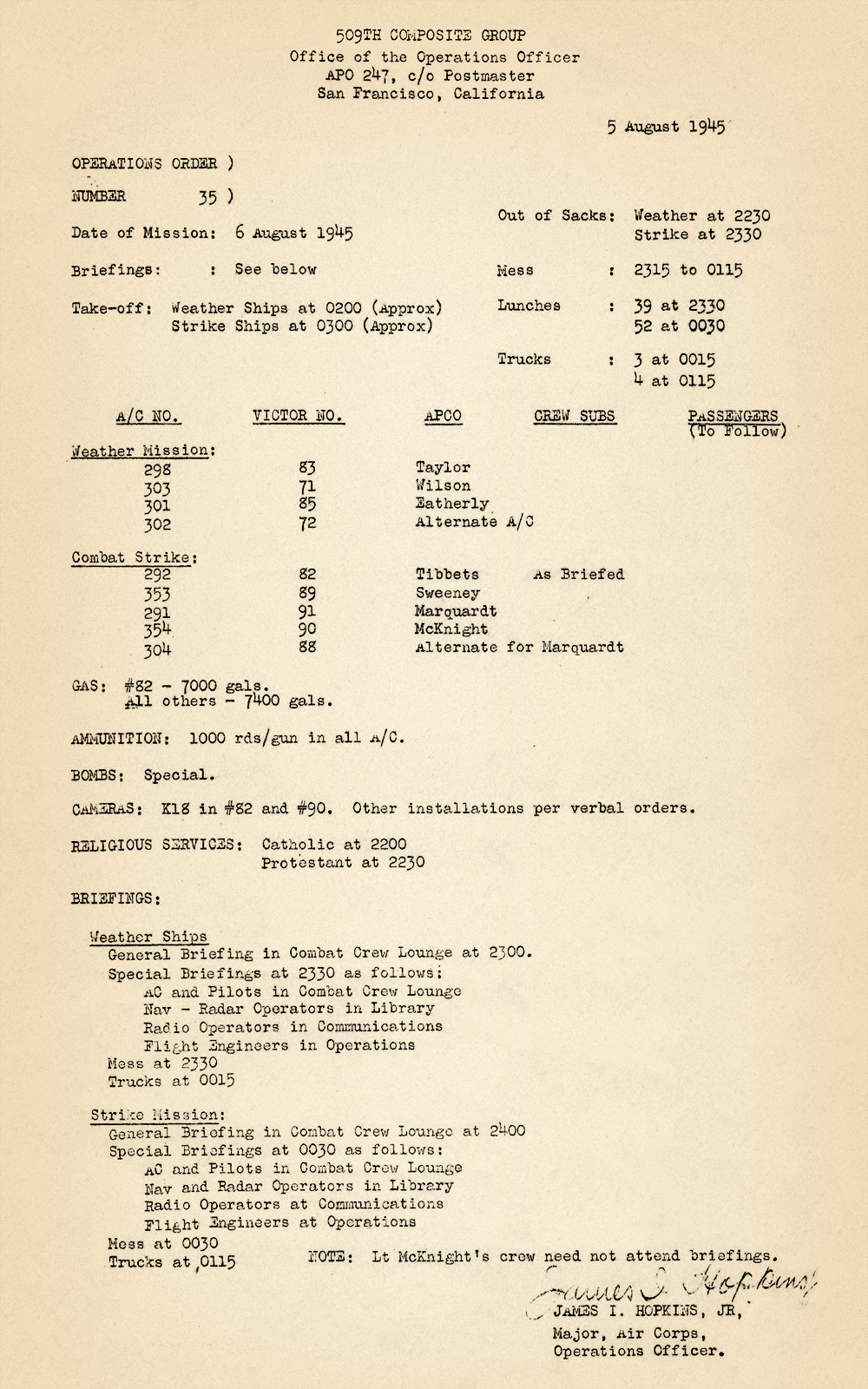
The strike order for the atomic bombing of Hiroshima, signed by Hopkins on August 5, 1945

For the atomic bombing of Nagasaki on August 9, 1945, Hopkins was the aircraft commander of Big Stink, the camera aircraft, flown by crew C-14 with two British observers, Leonard Cheshire and William Penney. Before takeoff, Hopkins ordered the physicist Robert Serber, the only crew member who knew how to operate the aircraft's high-speed camera, off the aircraft because he had forgotten his parachute. Big Stink did not join the strike aircraft Bockscar at the rendezvous point over Yakushima; Hopkins was circling at 39,000 feet (12,000 m), 9,000 feet (2,700 m) higher than planned. Charles Sweeney, piloting Bockscar, waited for him for 45 minutes despite orders to wait no more than 15, which contributed to Bockscar's fuel shortage later in the mission. Sweeney later blamed Hopkins for the delay, while Paul Tibbets blamed Sweeney and Frederick Ashworth. According to Sweeney, Hopkins broke radio silence to ask Tinian whether Sweeney had aborted; the message was received in garbled form as "Sweeney aborted", and air-sea rescue preparations were called off. Proceeding alone, Big Stink reached Nagasaki after the detonation and photographed the mushroom cloud from 39,000 feet.

Hopkins was promoted to lieutenant colonel on August 28, 1945, three weeks after the bombings. Japan formally surrendered the next week, ending the war.

=== Post-war and disappearance ===
After the war, Hopkins remained with the 509th Composite Group. In February 1946, he was deployed to Kwajalein Atoll, and by late 1946 he was serving at Roswell Army Air Field. He later became chief of personnel at Strategic Air Command headquarters at Offutt Air Force Base, and was then temporarily assigned to the SAC staff at Barksdale Air Force Base. In March 1951, a Douglas C-124 Globemaster II of the 2nd Strategic Support Squadron, flying from Walker Air Force Base to England, stopped at Barksdale, where Hopkins boarded with Brigadier General Paul T. Cullen and his staff. On March 23, the aircraft reported a fire in the cargo hold and ditched in the Atlantic Ocean hundreds of miles west of Ireland. Although the ditching was successful and survivors were spotted in life rafts by a search plane, no rescue vessels arrived before the rafts vanished. No bodies or debris were ever recovered.

== Legacy ==
A headstone was placed for Hopkins in his hometown of Palestine in 1951. On September 30, 2021, following an 18-month application process initiated by his son, the 509th Bomb Wing held a memorial ceremony for Hopkins at Arlington National Cemetery, where a cenotaph was dedicated in his honor. He was the fifth person lost in the 1951 crash to receive a headstone at Arlington.
