= Woodrow Swancutt =

Air Force General

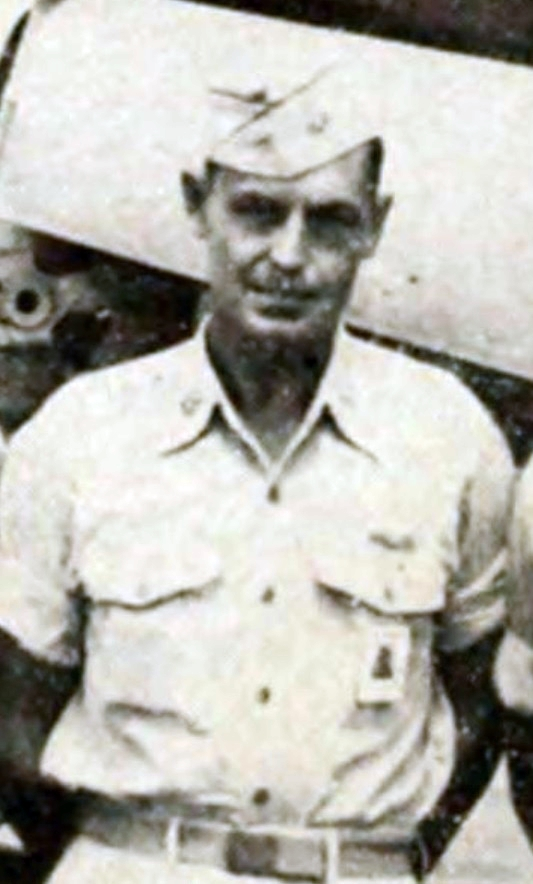
- Born: Woodrow Paul Swancutt; 4 July 1915; Edgar, Wisconsin, U.S.
- Died: 21 March 1993 (aged 77); San Antonio, Texas, U.S.
- Burial place: Arlington National Cemetery
- Military career
- Allegiance: United States
- Branch: United States Army Air Forces; United States Air Force
- Service years: 1940-1968
- Rank: Major general
- Commands: Squadron of 509th Bombardment Group; 42nd Bombardment Group; 91st Strategic Reconnaissance Wing; 822d Air Division
- Conflicts: World War II; Korean War; Vietnam War
- Awards: Legion of Merit with two oak leaf clusters Distinguished Flying Cross with oak leaf cluster Air Medal with oak leaf cluster Air Force Commendation Medal

Woodrow Paul Swancutt (July 4, 1915 – March 21, 1993) was a major general in the United States Air Force.

== Biography ==
Swancutt was born on July 4, 1915, in Edgar, Wisconsin. He graduated from La Crosse Central High School in La Crosse, Wisconsin, in 1933 and attended the University of Wisconsin-Madison, where he was a member of the Wisconsin Badgers boxing team and was a national champion in 1939 and 1940. Swancutt married Kathleen Haza. They had three children and eventually divorced. As a civilian he served as vice president of Executive Jet Aviation. He died from heart failure on March 21, 1993, in San Antonio, Texas, and is buried at Arlington National Cemetery.

== Military career ==
Swancutt originally joined the United States Army Air Corps in 1940. He was listed a second lieutenant and then, in 1943, a captain assigned to Bolling Field, D.C. in 1942–1943. During World War II Swancutt was a Boeing B-29 Superfortress pilot in the 40th Bombardment Group, which was the first B-29 unit to fly in battle.

Following the war Swancutt was selected as a pilot on Dave's Dream to drop the nuclear weapon during Operation Crossroads.

Later Swancutt was assigned as a squadron commander of the 509th Bombardment Group. In 1949 Swancutt was assigned to serve as chief of the Operations Division and deputy director of Operations at the headquarters of the Eighth Air Force. From 1952 to 1954 Swancutt served as the Director of Operations of the 7th Air Division. Later he served as deputy wing commander and eventually, in 1956, wing commander of the 42nd Bombardment Group. In 1957 Swancutt was named commander of the 91st Strategic Reconnaissance Wing. The wing would eventually be converted to the 376th Bombardment Wing, where he served as a commander from December 1957 to April 1959. Swancutt served as Director of Safety at the Headquarters of Strategic Air Command from May 1959 to September 1960. From 1962 to 1965 Swancutt served as commander of the 822d Air Division. It was then that he would become deputy director of Operations for Strategic and Defense Forces at the Air Force Headquarters. The following year he would be named director. Swancutt was also the steering and coordinating member of the Permanent Joint Board on Defense. In 1967 he was named Vice Commander of the Second Air Force.

Swancutt's retirement was effective as of August 1, 1968.

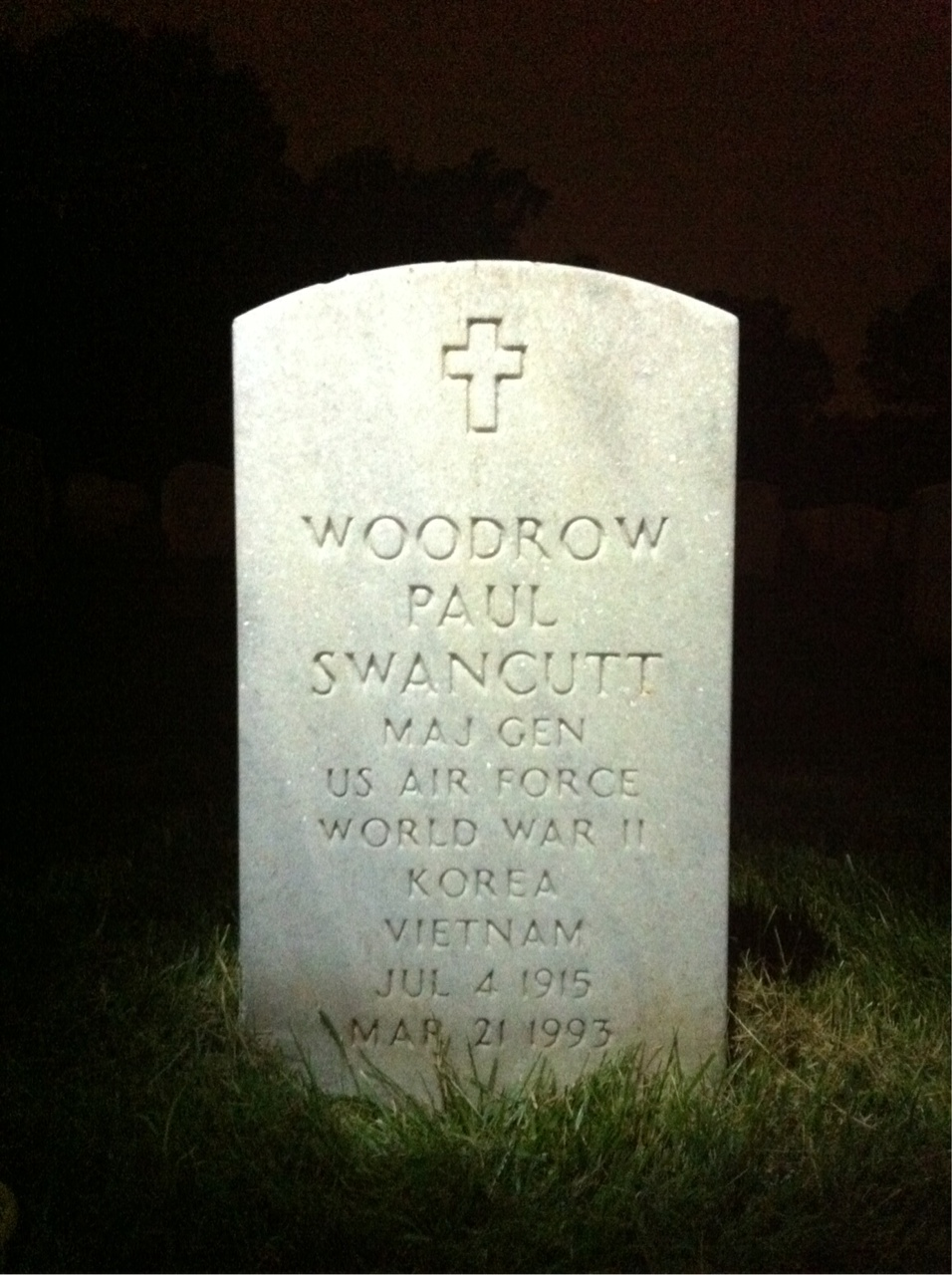
Grave at Arlington National Cemetery

== Awards ==
In 1968, Swancutt received the Billy Mitchell Memorial Award.

Awards Swancutt received include the Legion of Merit with two oak leaf clusters, the Distinguished Flying Cross with oak leaf cluster, the Air Medal with oak leaf cluster, the Air Force Commendation Medal, the Presidential Unit Citation, and the Outstanding Unit Award.
