= Manhattan Project (disambiguation) =

The Manhattan Project was the code name given to the American effort to develop the first nuclear weapons during World War II, with assistance from the United Kingdom and Canada.

Manhattan Project may also refer to:

== Film and television ==
- The Manhattan Project (film), a 1986 drama
- "The Manhattan Project" (Ugly Betty), an episode of Ugly Betty
- The Manhattan Project, a 2019 comedy film, released in 2022

== Music ==
- The Manhattan Project (album), a 1990 album by a short-lived jazz/fusion supergroup of the same name
- "Manhattan Project" (song), a 1985 song by Rush
- Manhattan Project (album), a 1978 album by Jamaican-born jazz trumpeter Dizzy Reece

== Theater ==
- The Manhattan Project, a theatrical company created in 1968 by André Gregory

== Video games ==
- Duke Nukem: Manhattan Project (2002), a video game
- Teenage Mutant Ninja Turtles III: The Manhattan Project (1991), a video game

== See also ==
- Manhattan (TV series), a 2014 WGN original series loosely based on the Manhattan Project
- The Manhattan Projects, a comic book series about an alternate reality Manhattan Project developing a wider range of science experiments
- Manhattan Project National Historical Park, a park commemorating the Manhattan Project located in Washington state, New Mexico and Tennessee
- Manhattan Bail Project, a pre-trial services program from the 1960s
- Mannahatta Project, ecological reconstruction of Manhattan as it appeared in 1609
