= Ebola (disambiguation) =

Ebola is the Ebola virus disease of humans and other primates caused by ebolaviruses.

Ebola may also refer to:

- Ebola virus (Zaire ebolavirus), a species within the genus Ebolavirus, the cause of the majority of human deaths from Ebola virus disease
- Ebola River, a river in the Democratic Republic of the Congo
- Ebola (band), a Thai rock band
- "Ebola (La La)" a 2014 song by Rucka Rucka Ali

== See also ==
- Eboladrome, a test track used by The Grand Tour television series
- Ebolavirus, a genus of viruses with six known species known as ebolaviruses
- Eboli, a town in Italy
- List of Ebola outbreaks
- Western African Ebola virus epidemic, a 2013–2016 outbreak
