= Boxcar (disambiguation) =

A boxcar is an enclosed railroad car for carrying general freight.

Boxcar(s) may also refer to:

== Music ==
- Boxcar (band), an Australian synth pop/techno band
- Box Car Racer, a former American punk band
- The Boxcars, an American Bluegrass band
- Boxcar, a 7" vinyl release by Plaid Retina
- "Boxcar", a song by Jawbreaker from 24 Hour Revenge Therapy
- "Boxcar", a song by Neil Young from Chrome Dreams II

== Other uses ==
- Boxcar (game), alternative name of the dice game Dice 10000
- Boxcars (slang), in dice games, a pair of sixes
- Boxcar averager, an electronic test device
- Boxcar Books, a bookstore in Bloomington, Indiana, U.S.
- Boxcar Comics, a webcomic collective
- The Boxcar Children, a series of children's books
- Boxcar function, a mathematical function
- Fairchild C-119 Flying Boxcar, a U.S. military transport aircraft

== See also ==
- Bockscar, an American aircraft that bombed Nagasaki in 1945
