= Big Stink (aircraft) =

B-29 bomber that observed the bombing of Nagasaki

Big Stink (1945–1946)
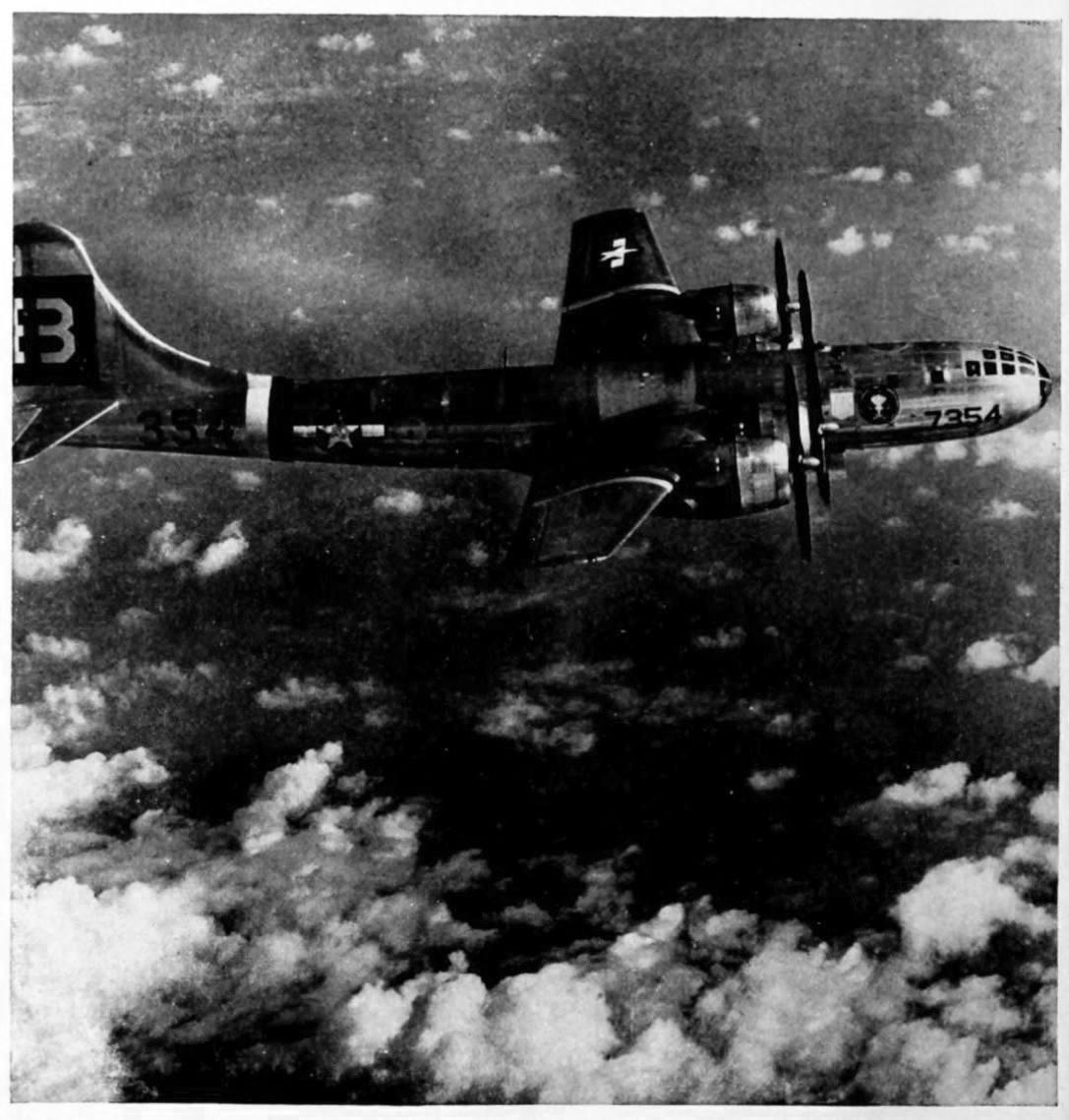
- Dave's Dream on the Bombing Run at Bikini Atoll, circa 1946

General information
- Other name: Dave's Dream (1946–1960)
- Type: Boeing B-29-40-MO Superfortress
- Manufacturer: Glenn L. Martin Company at Omaha, Nebraska
- Owners: United States Army Air Forces
- Serial: 44-27354

History
- In service: April 20, 1945
- Fate: Struck off charge and allocated for salvage from February 1960

Big Stink – later renamed Dave's Dream – was a United States Army Air Forces Boeing B-29-40-MO Superfortress bomber (Victor number 90) that participated in the atomic bomb attack on Nagasaki, Japan on August 9, 1945. Assigned to the 393d Bomb Squadron, 509th Composite Group, it was used as a camera plane in support of the bomb-carrying B-29 Bockscar to photograph the explosion and effects of the bomb, and also to carry scientific observers. The mission was flown by crew C-14 but with Group Operations Officer Major James I. Hopkins, Jr., as the aircraft commander.

Victor 90 left without one of the support members when Major Hopkins ordered Robert Serber of Project Alberta to leave the plane – reportedly after the B-29 had already taxied onto the runway – because the scientist had forgotten his parachute. Since Serber was the only crew member who knew how to operate the high-speed camera, Hopkins had to be instructed by radio from Tinian on its use.

The aircraft failed to make its rendezvous with the remainder of the strike flight, which completed the mission without it. It did however arrive at Nagasaki in time to photograph the effects of the blast – albeit at an altitude of 39,000 feet (12,000 meters) rather than the planned 30,000 feet (9,100 meters) – then recovered at Yontan Airfield, Okinawa, with both Bockscar and the B-29 The Great Artiste.

== History ==
B-29-40-MO 44-27354 was built at the Glenn L. Martin Aircraft Plant at Omaha, Nebraska, accepted by the U.S. Army Air Forces on 20 April 1945, and flown to Wendover Army Air Field, Utah, by its assigned crew A-5 (under Lieutenant Colonel Thomas J. Classen, aircraft commander and group deputy commander) in May 1945. It departed Wendover for North Field on Tinian on 24 June 1945 and arrived 29 June 1945.

The aircraft originally was assigned the Victor (unit-assigned identification) number 10 but on 1 August 1945 was given the circle R tail markings of the 6th Bombardment Group as a security measure and had its Victor changed to 90 to avoid misidentification with actual 6th Bombardment Group aircraft. On 23 July 1945, with Colonel Paul Tibbets at the controls, it dropped a dummy "Little Boy" atomic bomb assembly off Tinian to test its radar altimeter detonators.

On 6 August 1945, the aircraft was flown by crew B-8 (commanded by First Lieutenant Charles McKnight) as a back-up spare but landed on Iwo Jima when all other aircraft in the flight continued on. The airplane was reassigned to crew C-12 (under Captain Captain Herman S. Zahn) immediately following the Nagasaki mission, who named the airplane Big Stink and had nose art applied.

Big Stink also flew 12 training and practice missions, and two combat missions to drop pumpkin bombs on industrial targets at Nagaoka and Hitachi, Japan, both flown by Classen and crew A-5. Big Stink was flown by more crews (nine of the 15) on operational missions than any other 393d Bombardment Squadron B-29.

After World War II, Big Stink served with the 509th Composite Group at Roswell Army Air Field. In April 1946 it was assigned to Operation Crossroads, and renamed Dave's Dream by its crew in honor of Captain David Semple, a bombardier who had been killed in the crash of another B-29 on 7 March 1946, near Albuquerque, New Mexico. Semple had been a bombardier in many of the 155 test drops for the Manhattan Project. On 1 July 1946, Dave's Dream while under the command of Major Woodrow Swancutt (who would become a major general in the United States Air Force) dropped the "Fat Man"-type atomic bomb used in Test Able of Operation Crossroads at Bikini Atoll.

In June 1949 Dave's Dream, operating in the by-then-independent United States Air Force, was transferred to the 97th Bombardment Group at Biggs Air Force Base, Texas. It was converted to a TB-29 training aircraft in April 1950 by the Oklahoma City Materiel Area at Tinker Air Force Base.

It was subsequently assigned to:

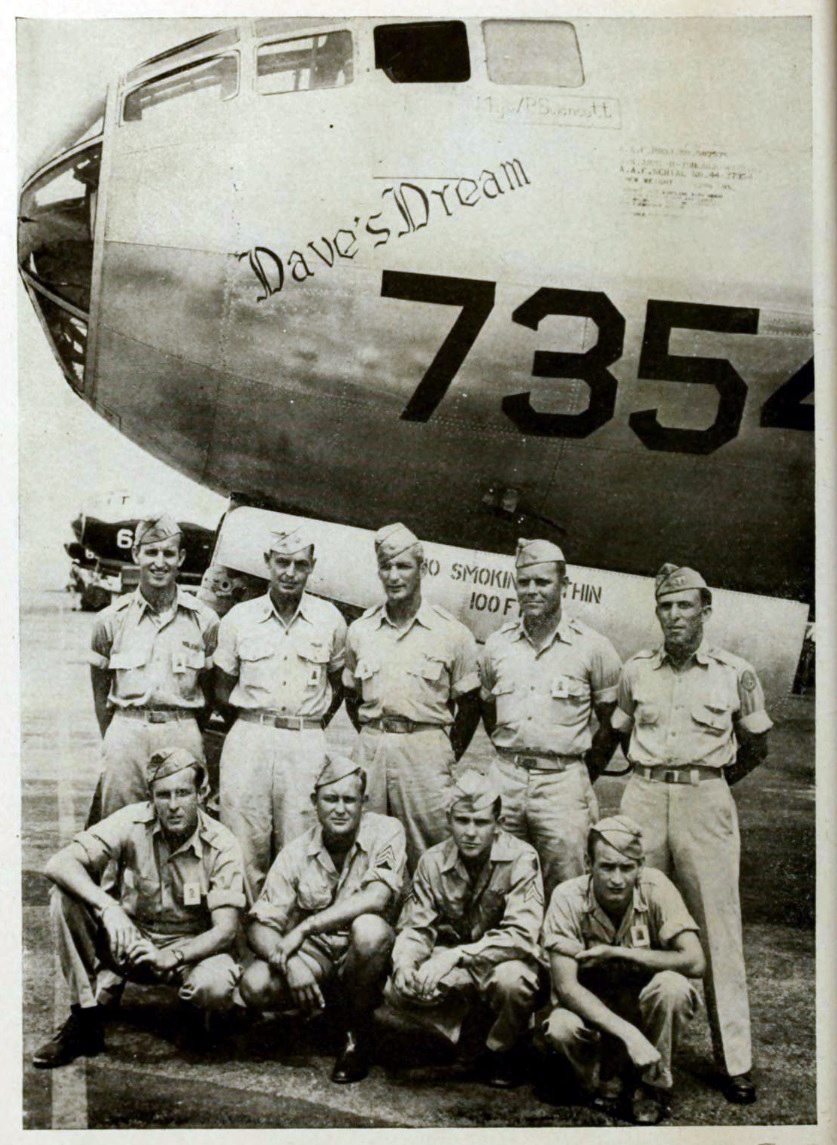
- The crew of "Dave's Dream" pose in front of their ship, c. 1946.
  106th Radar Calibration Squadron, Sioux City Air Force Base, Iowa (October 1952)
- 7th Radar Calibration Squadron, Sioux City Air Force Base (September 1953), and
- 4677th Radar Evaluation Flight, Hill Air Force Base, Utah (March 1954)

In June 1959 it was moved into storage at Davis-Monthan Air Force Base, Arizona, and was dropped from the U.S. Air Force inventory in February 1960 as salvage.

=== Hiroshima mission crew ===
Crew B-8 (regularly assigned to Top Secret):

- 1st Lt. Charles F. McKnight, airplane commander
- 2nd Lt. Jacob Y. Bontekoe, co-pilot
- 2nd Lt. Jack Widowsky, navigator
- 2nd Lt. Franklin H. MacGregor, bombardier
- 1st Lt. George H. Cohen, flight engineer
- Sgt. Lloyd J. Reeder, radio operator
- T/Sgt. William F. Orren, radar operator
- Sgt. Roderick E. Legg, tail gunner
- Cpl. Donald O. Cole, assistant engineer/scanner

=== Nagasaki mission crew ===
Crew C-14 (normally assigned to Necessary Evil; 1st Lt. Norman Ray):

- Major James I. Hopkins Jr., aircraft commander
- 2nd Lt. John E. Cantlon, co-pilot
- 2nd Lt. Stanley G. Steinke, navigator
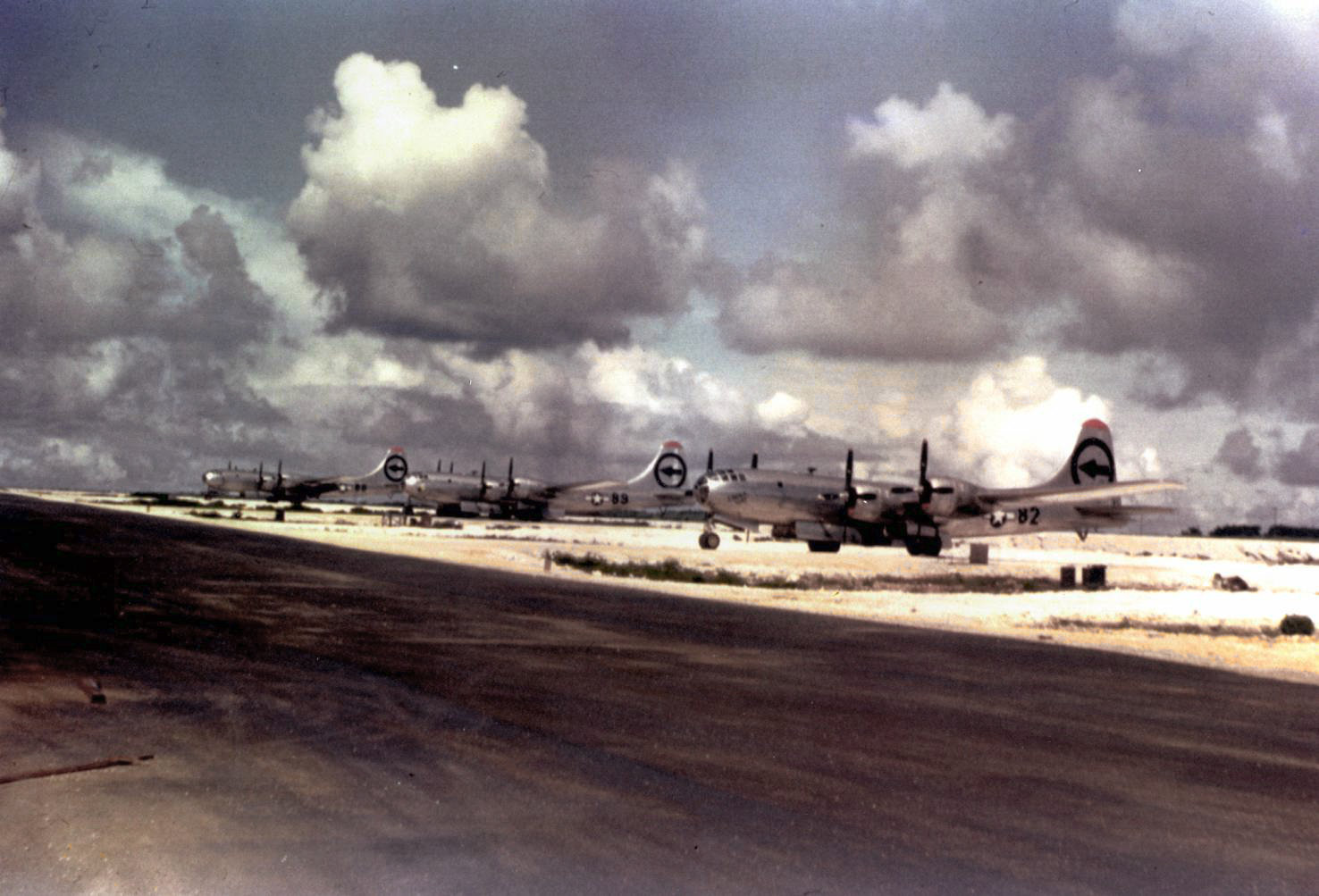
- 509th Composite Group aircraft immediately before their bombing mission of Hiroshima. Left to right: Big Stink, The Great Artiste, and Enola Gay. Photo by Harold Agnew 1945
  2nd Lt. Myron Faryna, bombardier
- M/Sgt. George L. Brabenec, flight engineer
- Sgt. Francis X. Dolan, radio operator
- Cpl. Richard F. Cannon, radar operator
- Sgt. Martin G. Murray, tail gunner
- Sgt. Thomas A. Bunting, assistant engineer/scanner
- Cpl. Sidney J. Bellamy, radar observer

The crew were joined by two British observers:

- Group Captain Leonard Cheshire VC, former commander of 617 "Dambusters" squadron, and official representative of the British Prime Minister
- Professor William Penney, a member of Project Alberta and the leading expert on the predicted effects of nuclear weapons.

== Other aircraft named Big Stink ==
A FB-111A strategic bomber of the USAF 509th Bomb Wing, serial 67–7195, carried both the name and original nose art of Big Stink and the name Dave's Dream on its nosewheel doors while based at Pease Air Force Base, New Hampshire, in the 1970s and 1980s.
