= Enola, Nebraska =

Unincorporated community in Nebraska, United States

- Unincorporated community
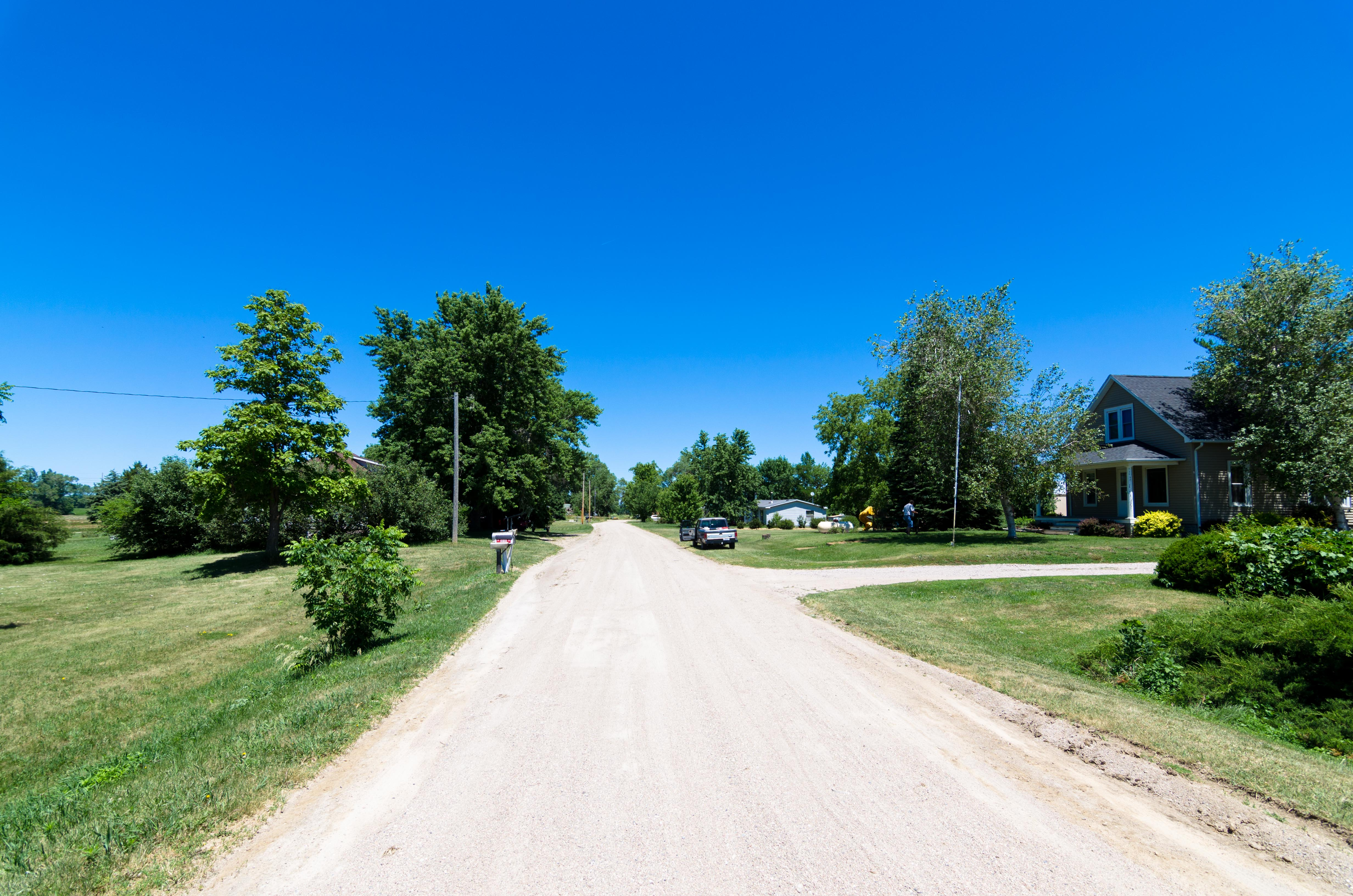

- Location within Nebraska
- Coordinates: 41°54′14″N 97°27′46″W
- Country: United States
- State: Nebraska
- County: Madison
- Elevation: 1,696 ft (517 m)
- Time zone: UTC-6 (Central (CST))
  - Summer (DST): UTC-5 (CDT)
- ZIP codes: 68701
- GNIS feature ID: 829138

Enola is an unincorporated community in Madison County, Nebraska, United States. It lies along local roads 8 miles (13 km) north of the city of Madison, the county seat of Madison County.

== History ==
A post office was established at Enola in 1906, and remained in operation until it was discontinued in 1959. T. J. Malone, Enola's founder, gave the community part of his name spelled backwards.

== See also ==
- List of geographic names derived from anagrams and ananyms
