= Paul Tibbets =

United States Air Force general (1915–2007)

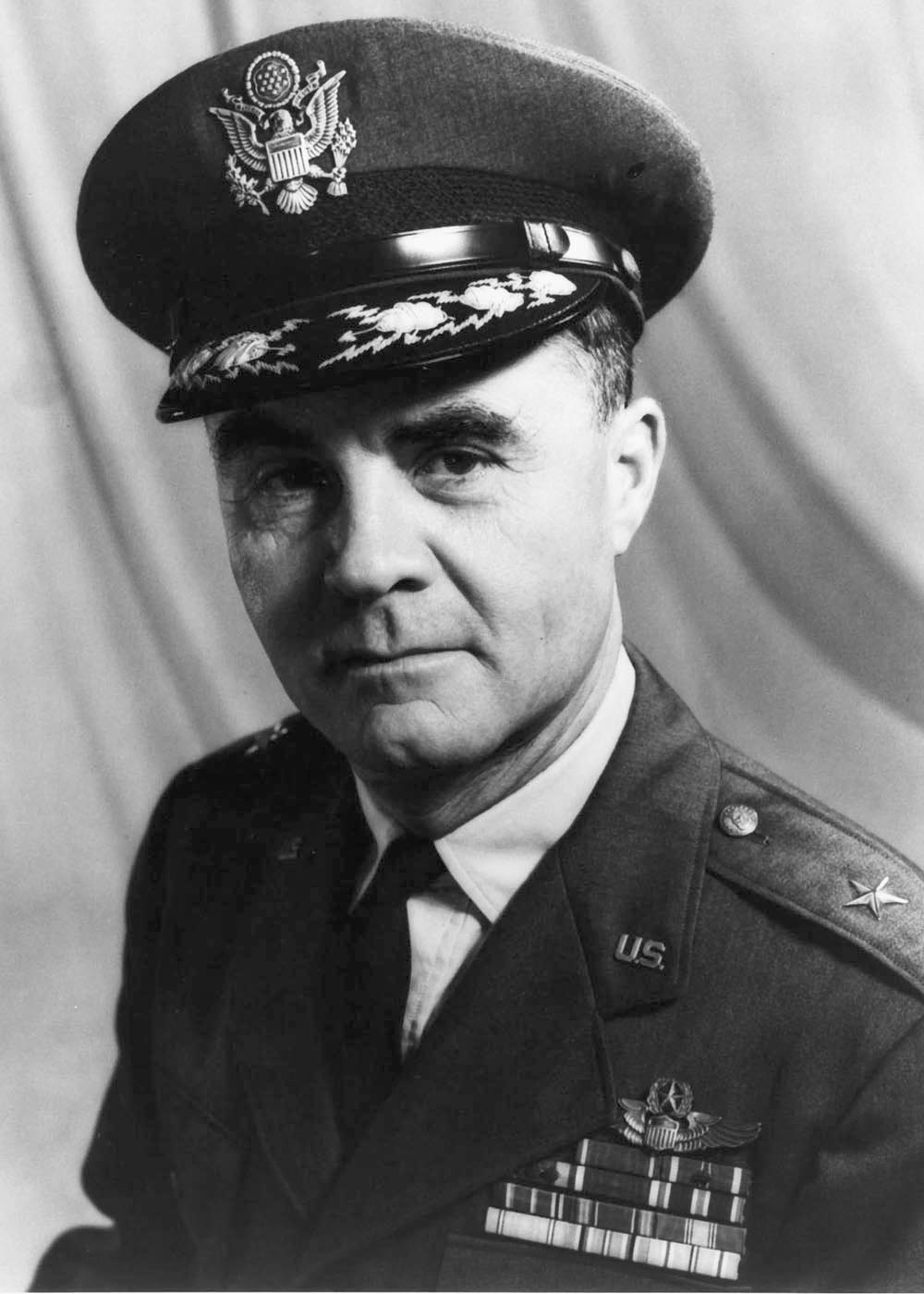
- Tibbets, c. 1960
- Born: Paul Warfield Tibbets Jr. 23 February 1915; Quincy, Illinois, U.S.
- Died: 1 November 2007 (aged 92); Columbus, Ohio, U.S.
- Alma mater: University of Florida (BA); University of Cincinnati
- Military career
- Allegiance: United States
- Branch: United States Army; Army Air Forces; United States Air Force
- Service years: 1937–1966
- Rank: Brigadier General
- Commands: 340th Bombardment Squadron; 509th Composite Group; 308th Bombardment Wing; 6th Air Division
- Conflicts: World War II; Operation Torch; Combined Bomber Offensive; Air raids on Japan; Atomic bombings of Hiroshima and Nagasaki
- Awards: Distinguished Service Cross; Legion of Merit; Distinguished Flying Cross (2); Purple Heart; Air Medal (4)
- Other work: Charter Pilot and President of Executive Jet Aviation

Signature
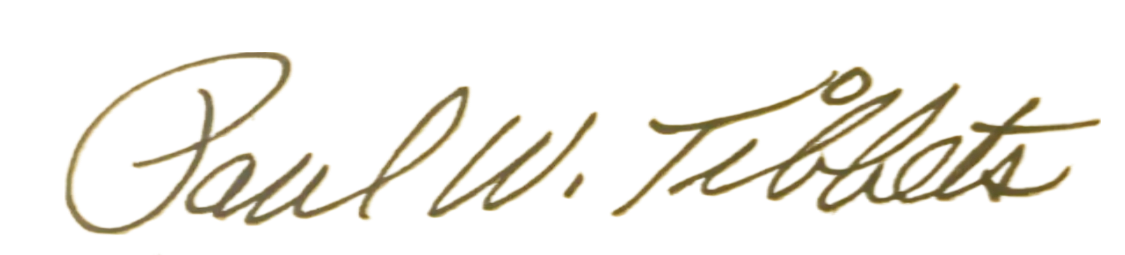

Paul Warfield Tibbets Jr. (23 February 1915 – 1 November 2007) was a brigadier general in the United States Air Force. He is best known as the aircraft captain who flew the B-29 Superfortress known as the Enola Gay (named after his mother) when it dropped a Little Boy, the first of two atomic bombs used in warfare, on the Japanese city of Hiroshima.

Tibbets enlisted in the United States Army in 1937 and qualified as a pilot in 1938. After the Japanese attack on Pearl Harbor, he flew anti-submarine patrols over the Atlantic. In February 1942, he became the commanding officer of the 340th Bombardment Squadron of the 97th Bombardment Group, which was equipped with the Boeing B-17. In July 1942, the 97th became the first heavy bombardment group to be deployed as part of the Eighth Air Force, and Tibbets became deputy group commander. He co-piloted the lead plane in the first American daylight heavy bomber mission against German-occupied Europe on 17 August 1942 that was piloted by Colonel Frank Alton Armstrong, Jr. (the 97th Bomb Group CO); and the first American raid of more than 100 bombers in Europe on 9 October 1942. Tibbets was chosen to fly Major General Mark W. Clark and Lieutenant General Dwight D. Eisenhower to Gibraltar. After flying 14 (possibly 25) combat missions, he became the assistant for bomber operations on the staff of the Twelfth Air Force.

Tibbets returned to the United States in February 1943 to help with the development of the Boeing B-29 Superfortress. In September 1944, he was appointed the commander of the 509th Composite Group, which would conduct the atomic bombings of Hiroshima and Nagasaki. After the war, he participated in the Operation Crossroads nuclear weapon tests at Bikini Atoll in mid-1946, and was involved in the development of the Boeing B-47 Stratojet in the early 1950s. He commanded the 308th Bombardment Wing and 6th Air Division in the late 1950s, and was military attaché in India from 1964 to 1966. After leaving the Air Force in 1966, he worked for Executive Jet Aviation, serving on the founding board and as its president from 1976 until his retirement in 1987.

After the war he received wide publicity, including motion picture portrayals, and became a symbolic figure in the debate over the Hiroshima and Nagasaki bombings.

== Early life ==
Paul Warfield Tibbets Jr. was born in Quincy, Illinois, on 23 February 1915, the son of Paul Warfield Tibbets Sr. and his wife, Enola Gay (Haggard) Tibbets. When he was five years old, the family moved to Davenport, Iowa, and then to Iowa's capital, Des Moines, where he was raised, and where his father became a confections wholesaler. When he was eight, his family moved to Hialeah, Florida, to escape from harsh midwestern winters. As a boy, he was very interested in flying. One day, his mother agreed to pay one dollar to get him into an airplane at the local carnival. In 1927, Tibbet's father hired a barnstormer, Doug Davis, to fly over Hialeah Park Race Track as a promotional stunt. Tibbets, who was 12 years old at the time, flew with Davis, dropping Baby Ruth candy bars with tiny parachutes to the crowd of people attending the races.

In the late 1920s, business issues forced Tibbets's family to return to Alton, Illinois, where he graduated from Western Military Academy in 1933. He then attended the University of Florida in Gainesville, and became an initiated member of the Epsilon Zeta chapter of Sigma Nu fraternity in 1934. During that time, Tibbets took private flying lessons at Miami's Opa-locka Airport with Rusty Heard, who later became a captain at Eastern Airlines. After his undergraduate work, Tibbets had planned on becoming an abdominal surgeon. He transferred to the University of Cincinnati after his second year to complete his pre-med studies there, because the University of Florida had no medical school at the time. However, he attended for only a year and a half as he changed his mind about wanting to become a doctor. Instead, he decided to enlist in the United States Army and become a pilot in the United States Army Air Corps.

== Early military career ==
Because he went to a military school, attended some college, and had some flight experience, Tibbets qualified for the Aviation Cadet Training Program. On 25 February 1937, he enlisted in the army at Fort Thomas, Kentucky, and was sent to Randolph Field in San Antonio, Texas, for primary and basic flight instruction. During his training, he showed himself to be an above-average pilot. He was commissioned as a second lieutenant and received his pilot rating in 1938 at Kelly Field in San Antonio.

After graduation, Tibbets was assigned to the 16th Observation Squadron, which was based at Lawson Field, Georgia, with a flight supporting the Infantry School at nearby Fort Benning. It was at Fort Benning that Tibbets met Lucy Frances Wingate, then a clerk at a department store in Columbus, Georgia. The two quietly married in a Roman Catholic seminary in Holy Trinity, Alabama, on 18 June 1938 even though Tibbets was a Protestant. Tibbets did not inform his family or his commanding officer, and the couple arranged for the notice to be kept out of the local newspaper. They had two sons. Paul III was born in 1940, in Columbus, Georgia, and graduated from Huntingdon College and Auburn University. He was a colonel in the United States Army Reserve and worked as a hospital pharmacist. He died in West Monroe, Louisiana, in 2016. The younger son, Gene Wingate Tibbets, was born in 1944, and was at the time of his death in 2012 residing in Georgiana in Butler County in southern Alabama.

While Tibbets was stationed at Fort Benning, he was promoted to first lieutenant and served as a personal pilot for Brigadier General George S. Patton, Jr., in 1940 and 1941. In June 1941, Tibbets transferred to the 9th Bombardment Squadron of the 3rd Bombardment Group at Hunter Field, Savannah, Georgia, as the engineering officer, and flew the A-20 Havoc. While there he was promoted to captain. In December 1941, he received orders to join the 29th Bombardment Group at MacDill Field, Florida, for training on the Boeing B-17 Flying Fortress. On 7 December 1941, Tibbets heard about the Japanese attack on Pearl Harbor while listening to the radio during a routine flight. Due to fears that German U-boats might enter Tampa Bay and bombard MacDill Field, the 29th Bombardment Group moved to Savannah. Tibbets remained on temporary duty with the 3rd Bombardment Group, forming an anti-submarine patrol at Pope Army Airfield, North Carolina, with 21 B-18 Bolo medium bombers. The B-18s were used as an intermediate trainer, which pilots flew after basic flight training in a Cessna UC-78 and before qualifying in the B-17.

== War against Germany ==
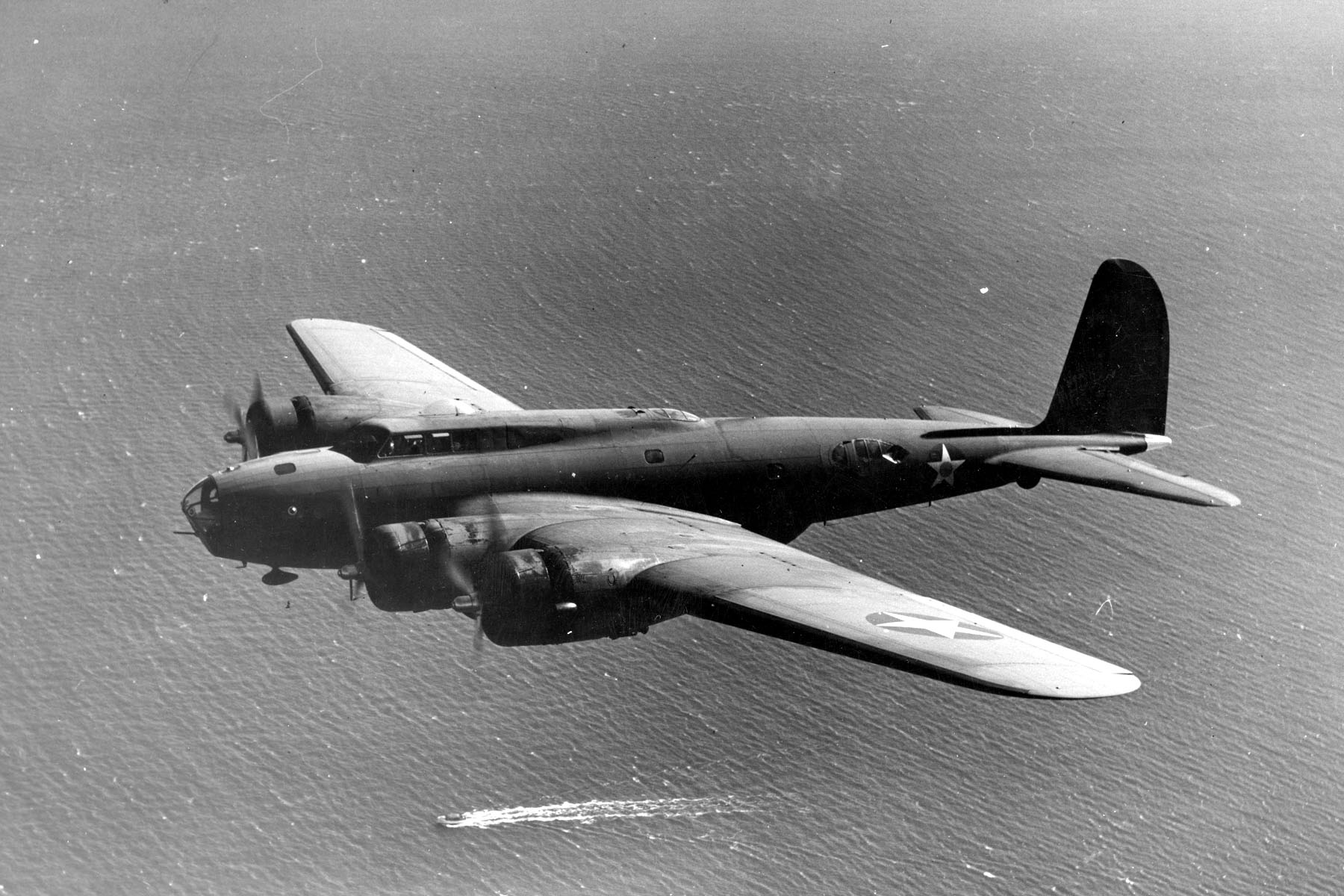
Boeing B-17D in flight

In February 1942, Tibbets reported for duty with the 29th Bombardment Group as its engineering officer. Three weeks later he was named the commanding officer of the 340th Bombardment Squadron of the 97th Bombardment Group, equipped with the B-17D. It was initially based at MacDill, and then Sarasota Army Airfield, Florida, before moving to Godfrey Army Airfield in Bangor, Maine.

In July 1942 the 97th became the first heavy bombardment group of the Eighth Air Force to be deployed to England, where it was based at RAF Polebrook. It had been hastily assembled to meet demands for an early deployment, and arrived without any training in the basics of high altitude daylight bombing. In the first weeks of August 1942, under the tutelage of Royal Air Force veterans, the group received intensive training for its first mission. The group commander, Lieutenant Colonel Cornelius W. Cousland, was replaced by Colonel Frank A. Armstrong Jr., who appointed Tibbets as his deputy.

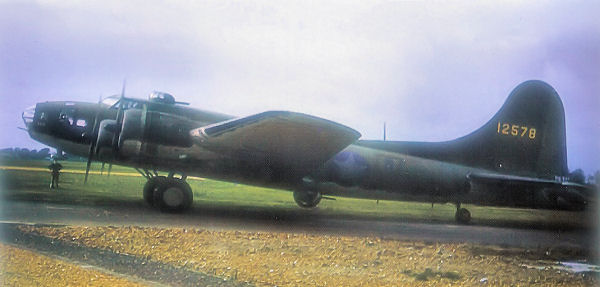
B-17E Butcher Shop, the aircraft Tibbets co-piloted for the Eighth Air Force's first daylight heavy bombing mission

Tibbets co-piloted the lead bomber Butcher Shop with Armstrong as the pilot for the first American daylight heavy bomber mission on 17 August 1942, a shallow-penetration raid against a marshalling yard in Rouen in Occupied France. This was not Tibbets's regular aircraft, Red Gremlin, nor his regular crew, which did not include bombardier Thomas Ferebee and navigator Theodore Van Kirk, who later flew with him in Enola Gay. On 9 October 1942, Tibbets led the first American raid of more than 100 bombers in Europe, attacking industrial targets in the French city of Lille. Poor bombing accuracy resulted in numerous civilian casualties and less damage to the rail installations than hoped, but the mission was hailed an overall success because it reached its target against heavy and constant fighter attack. Of the 108 aircraft in the raid, 33 were shot down or had to turn back due to mechanical problems.

On that first mission, Tibbets saw in real time that his bombs were falling on innocent civilians. At the time, he thought to himself, "People are getting killed down there that don't have any business getting killed. Those are not soldiers". But then he thought back to a lesson he had learned during his time at medical school from his roommate who was a doctor. This doctor explained to him about his former classmates who failed the program and ended up in drug sales. The reason why they had failed the program was because "they had too much sympathy for their patients", which "destroyed their ability to render the medical necessities". It dawned on Tibbets that:

I am just like that if I get to thinking about some innocent person getting hit on the ground. I am supposed to be a bomber pilot and destroy a target. I won't be worth anything if I do that ... I made up my mind then that the morality of dropping that bomb was not my business. I was instructed to perform a military mission to drop the bomb. That was the thing that I was going to do the best of my ability. Morality, there is no such thing in warfare. I don't care whether you are dropping atom bombs, or 100-pound bombs, or shooting a rifle. You have got to leave the moral issue out of it.

In the leadup to Operation Torch, the Allied invasion of North Africa, the commander of the Eighth Air Force, Major General Carl Spaatz was ordered to provide his best two pilots for a secret mission. He chose Tibbets and Major Wayne Connors. Tibbets flew Major General Mark W. Clark from Polebrook to Gibraltar while Connors flew Clark's chief of staff, Brigadier General Lyman Lemnitzer. A few weeks later Tibbets flew the Supreme Allied Commander, Lieutenant General Dwight D. Eisenhower, there. "By reputation", historian Stephen Ambrose wrote, Tibbets was "the best flier in the Army Air Force".

Tibbets had flown seven (7) combat missions against targets in France (six) and Holland (one) when the 97th Bomb Group was transferred to North Africa as part of Major General Jimmy Doolittle's Twelfth Air Force. For Tibbets, the war in North Africa introduced him to the realities of aerial warfare. He said that he saw the real effects of bombing civilians and the trauma of losing his brothers in arms. In January 1943, Tibbets, who had now flown 14 (possibly 25) combat missions, was assigned as the assistant for bomber operations to Colonel Lauris Norstad, Assistant Chief of Staff of Operations (A-3) of the Twelfth Air Force. Tibbets had recently been given a battlefield promotion to colonel, but did not receive it, as such promotions had to be confirmed by a panel of officers. He was told that Norstad had vetoed the promotion, saying "there's only going to be one colonel in operations".

Tibbets did not get along well with Norstad, or with Doolittle's chief of staff, Brigadier General Hoyt Vandenberg. In one planning meeting, Norstad wanted an all-out raid on Bizerte to be flown at 6,000 feet (1,800 m). Tibbets protested that flak would be most effective at that altitude. When challenged by Norstad, Tibbets said he would lead the mission himself at 6,000 feet if Norstad would fly as his co-pilot. Norstad backed down, and the mission was successfully flown at 20,000 feet (6,100 m).

== War against Japan ==
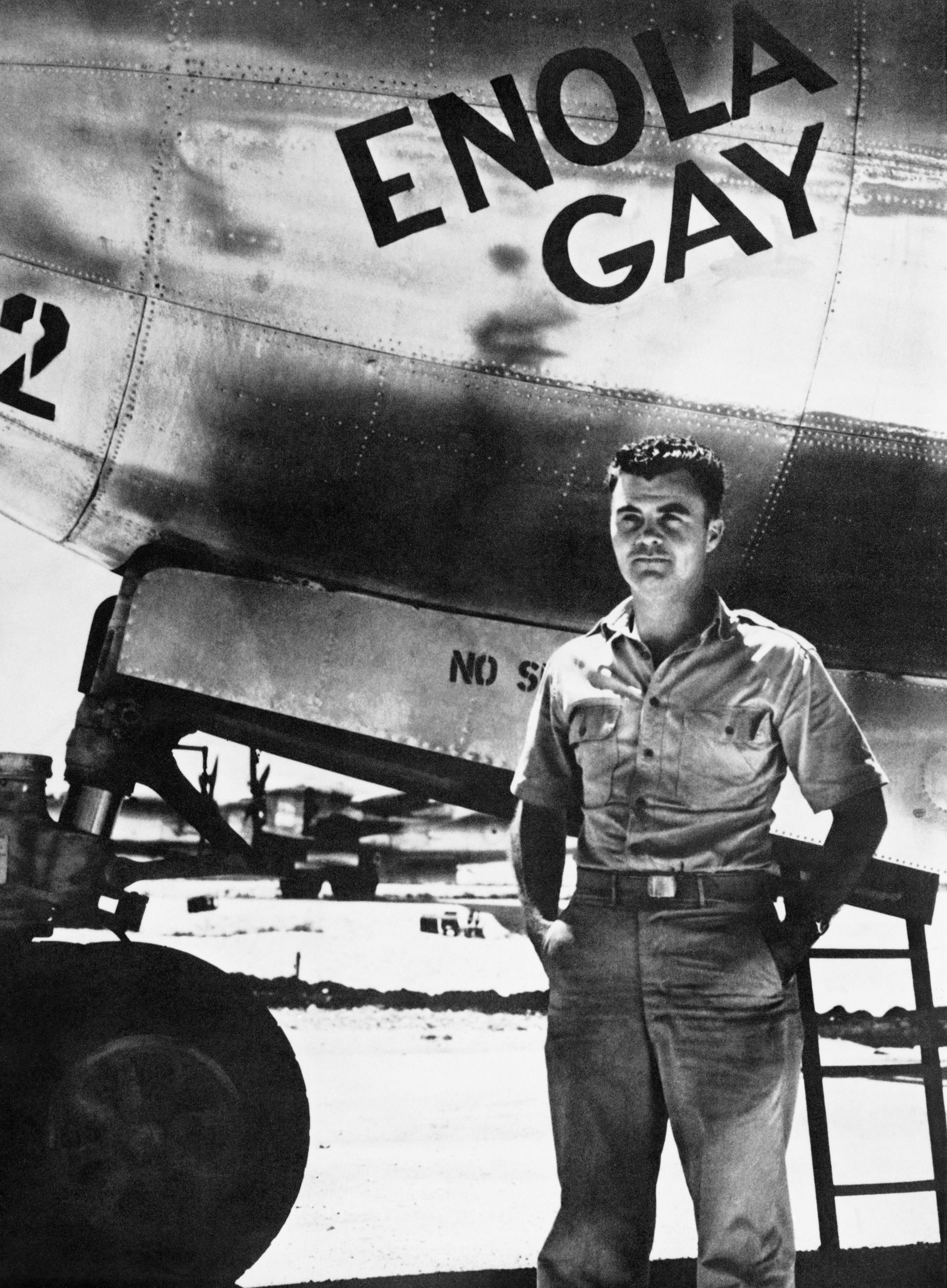
Tibbets with the Enola Gay

When General Henry H. "Hap" Arnold, the Chief of United States Army Air Forces, requested an experienced bombardment pilot to help with the development of the Boeing B-29 Superfortress bomber, Doolittle recommended Tibbets. Tibbets returned to the United States in February 1943. At the time, the B-29 program was beset by a host of technical problems, and the chief test pilot, Edmund T. Allen, had been killed in a crash of the prototype aircraft.

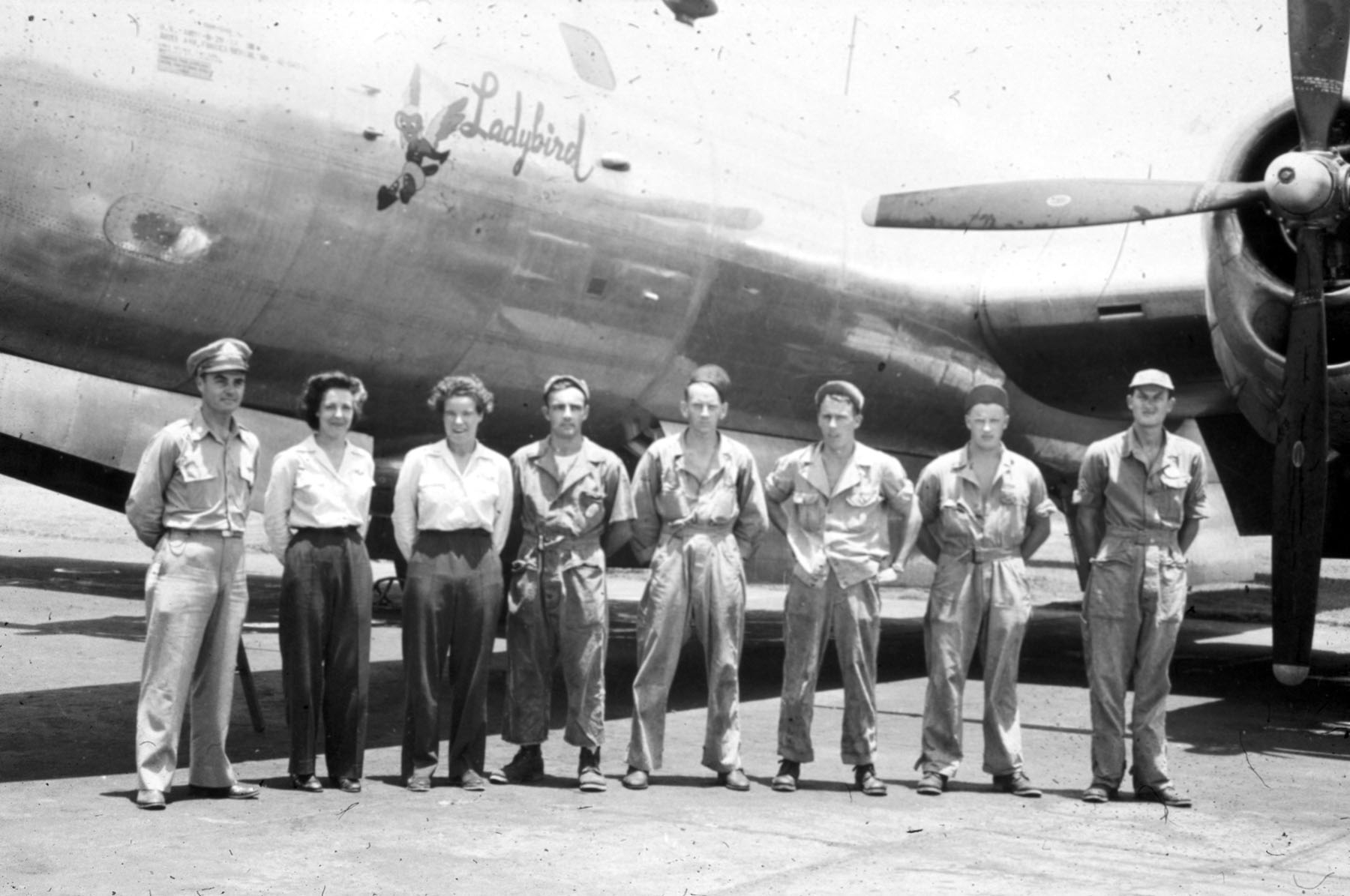
Tibbets with WASP pilots Dorothea Johnson Moorman and Dora Dougherty pose before their B-29 "Ladybird'

Working with the Boeing plant in Wichita, Kansas, Tibbets test-flew the B-29 and soon accumulated more flight time in it than any other pilot. He found that without defensive armament and armor plating, the aircraft was 7,000 pounds (3,200 kg) lighter, and its performance was much improved. In simulated combat engagements against a P-47 fighter at the B-29's cruising altitude of 30,000 feet (9,100 m), he discovered that the B-29 had a smaller turning radius than the P-47, and could avoid it by turning away.

After a year of developmental testing of the B-29, Tibbets was assigned in March 1944 as director of operations of the 17th Bombardment Operational Training Wing (Very Heavy), a B-29 training unit based at Grand Island Army Air Field, Nebraska, and commanded by Armstrong. Its role was to transition pilots to the B-29. Crews were reluctant to embrace the troublesome B-29, and to shame the male crews, Tibbets taught and certified two Women Airforce Service Pilots, Dora Dougherty and Dorothea (Didi) Johnson Moorman, to fly the B-29 as demonstration pilots, and the crews' attitude changed.

On 1 September 1944, Tibbets reported to Colorado Springs Army Airfield, the headquarters of the Second Air Force, where he met with its commander, Major General Uzal Ent, and three representatives of the Manhattan Project, Lieutenant Colonel John Lansdale Jr., Captain William S. Parsons, and Norman F. Ramsey Jr., who briefed him on the project. Tibbets was told that he would be in charge of the 509th Composite Group, a fully self-contained organization of about 1,800 men, which would have 15 B-29s and a high priority for all kinds of military stores. Ent gave Tibbets a choice of three possible bases: Great Bend Army Airfield, Kansas; Mountain Home Army Airfield, Idaho; or Wendover Army Air Field, Utah. Tibbets selected Wendover for its remoteness.

When the operation was still in its development stages, Armstrong and Colonel Roscoe C. Wilson were the leading candidates to command the group who was designated to drop the atomic bomb. Wilson was the Army Air Force project officer who provided liaison support to the Manhattan Project. Armstrong was an experienced combat veteran against German targets, but he was in his forties and had been severely injured in a fire in the summer of 1943. Wilson had no combat experience and was qualified primarily because of his engineering background and association with the project. Tibbets was considerably younger than both men and had experience in both staff and command duties in heavy bomber combat operations. He was already an experienced B-29 pilot, which made him an ideal candidate for the top-secret project. Tibbets indicated that the decision on what aircraft to use to deliver the bomb was left to him.

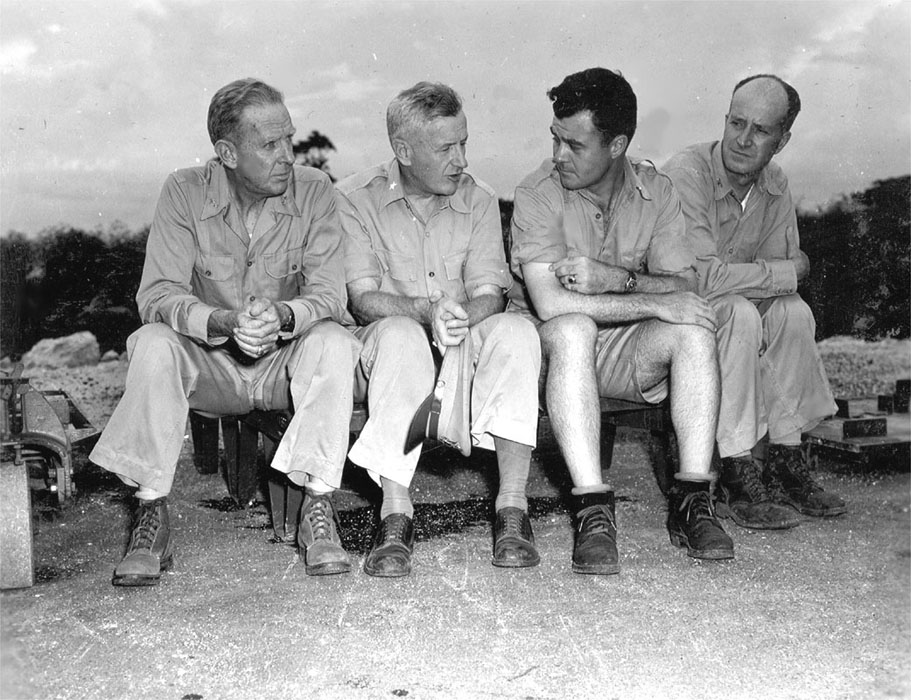
The "Tinian Joint Chiefs": Rear Admiral William R. Purnell, Brigadier General Thomas F. Farrell, Colonel Paul W. Tibbets, and Captain William S. Parsons

Tibbets was promoted to colonel in January 1945 and brought his wife and family along with him to Wendover. He felt that allowing married men in the group to bring their families would improve morale, although it put a strain on his own marriage. In order to disguise all the civilian engineers on base who were working on the Manhattan Project, Tibbets was forced to lie to his wife; he told her that the engineers were "sanitary workers". At one point, Tibbets found that Lucy had co-opted a scientist to unplug a drain. During a meeting with these "sanitary engineers", Tibbets was told by Robert Oppenheimer that his aircraft might not survive the shock waves from an atomic bomb explosion.

On 6 March 1945 (concurrent with the activation of Project Alberta), the 1st Ordnance Squadron, Special (Aviation) was activated at Wendover, again using Army Air Forces personnel on hand or already at Los Alamos. Its purpose was to provide "skilled machinists, welders and munitions workers" and special equipment to the group to enable it to assemble atomic weapons at its operating base, thereby allowing the weapons to be transported more safely in their component parts. A rigorous candidate selection process was used to recruit personnel, reportedly with an 80% rejection rate. The 509th Composite Group reached full strength in May 1945.

With the addition of the 1st Ordnance Squadron to its roster in March 1945, the 509th Composite Group had an authorized strength of 225 officers and 1,542 enlisted men, almost all of whom deployed to Tinian, an island in the northern Marianas within striking distance of Japan, in May and June 1945. The 320th Troop Carrier Squadron kept its base of operations at Wendover. In addition to its authorized strength, the 509th had attached to it on Tinian all 51 civilian and military personnel of Project Alberta. Furthermore, two representatives from Washington, D.C. were present on the island: the deputy director of the Manhattan Project, Brigadier General Thomas Farrell, and Rear Admiral William R. Purnell of the Military Policy Committee.

The ground support echelon of the 509th Composite Group received movement orders and moved by rail on 26 April 1945, to its port of embarkation at Seattle, Washington. On 6 May the support elements sailed on the SS Cape Victory for the Marianas, while the group's materiel was shipped on the SS Emile Berliner. An advance party of the air echelon flew by C-54 to North Field, Tinian, between 15 and 22 May, where it was joined by the ground echelon on 29 May 1945. Project Alberta's "Destination Team" also sent most of its members to Tinian to supervise the assembly, loading, and dropping of the bombs under the administrative title of 1st Technical Services Detachment, Miscellaneous War Department Group.

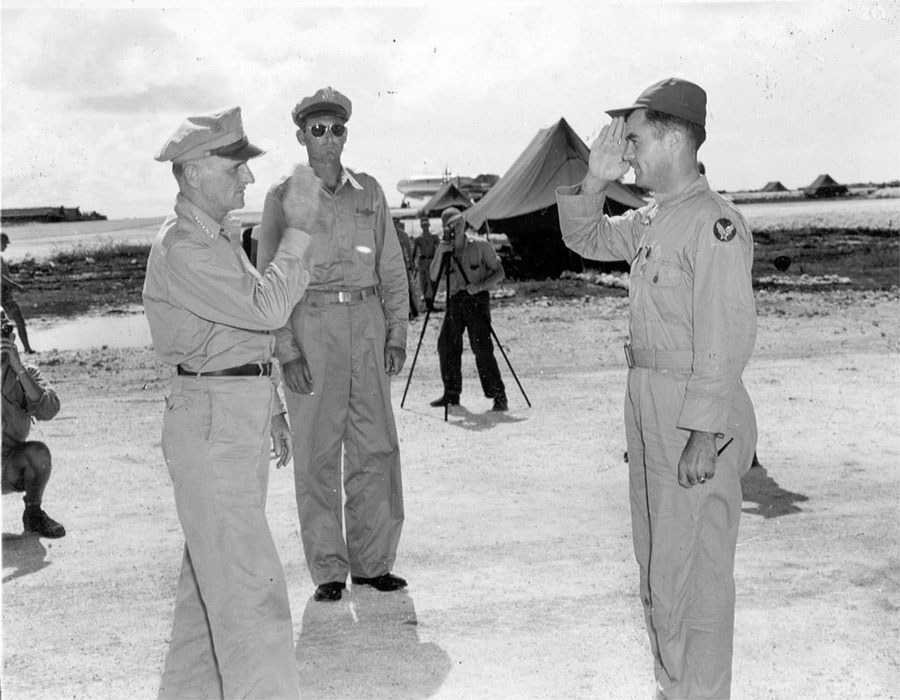
General Carl Spaatz decorates Tibbets with the Distinguished Service Cross after the Hiroshima mission

On 5 August 1945, Tibbets formally named his B-29 Enola Gay after his mother. Enola Gay, serial number 4486292, had been personally selected by him, on recommendation of a civilian production supervisor, while it was still on the assembly line at the Glenn L. Martin Company plant in Bellevue, Nebraska. The regularly assigned aircraft commander, Robert A. Lewis, was unhappy to be displaced by Tibbets for this important mission, and became furious when he arrived at the airfield on the morning of 6 August to see the aircraft he considered his painted with the now-famous nose art. Lewis would fly the mission as Tibbets's co-pilot.

At 02:45 the next day—in accordance with the terms of Operations Order No. 35—the Enola Gay departed North Field for Hiroshima, Japan, with Tibbets at the controls. Tinian was approximately 2,000 miles (3,200 km) away from Japan, so it took six hours to reach Hiroshima. The atomic bomb, code-named "Little Boy", was dropped over Hiroshima at 08:15 local time. Tibbets recalled that the city was covered with a tall mushroom cloud after the bomb was dropped.

Tibbets was awarded the Distinguished Service Cross by Spaatz immediately after landing on Tinian. He became a celebrity, with pictures and interviews of his wife and children in the major American newspapers. He was seen as a national hero who had ended the war with Japan. Tibbets later received an invitation from President Harry S. Truman to visit the White House. The 509th Composite Group was awarded an Air Force Outstanding Unit Award in 1999.

== Post-war military career ==
The 509th Composite Group returned to the United States on 6 November 1945, and was stationed at Roswell Army Airfield, New Mexico. Colonel William H. Blanchard replaced Tibbets as group commander on 22 January 1946, and also became the first commander of the 509th Bombardment Wing, the successor to the 509th Composite Group. Tibbets was a technical advisor to the 1946 Operation Crossroads nuclear tests at Bikini Atoll in the Pacific, but he and his Enola Gay crew were not chosen to drop another atomic bomb.

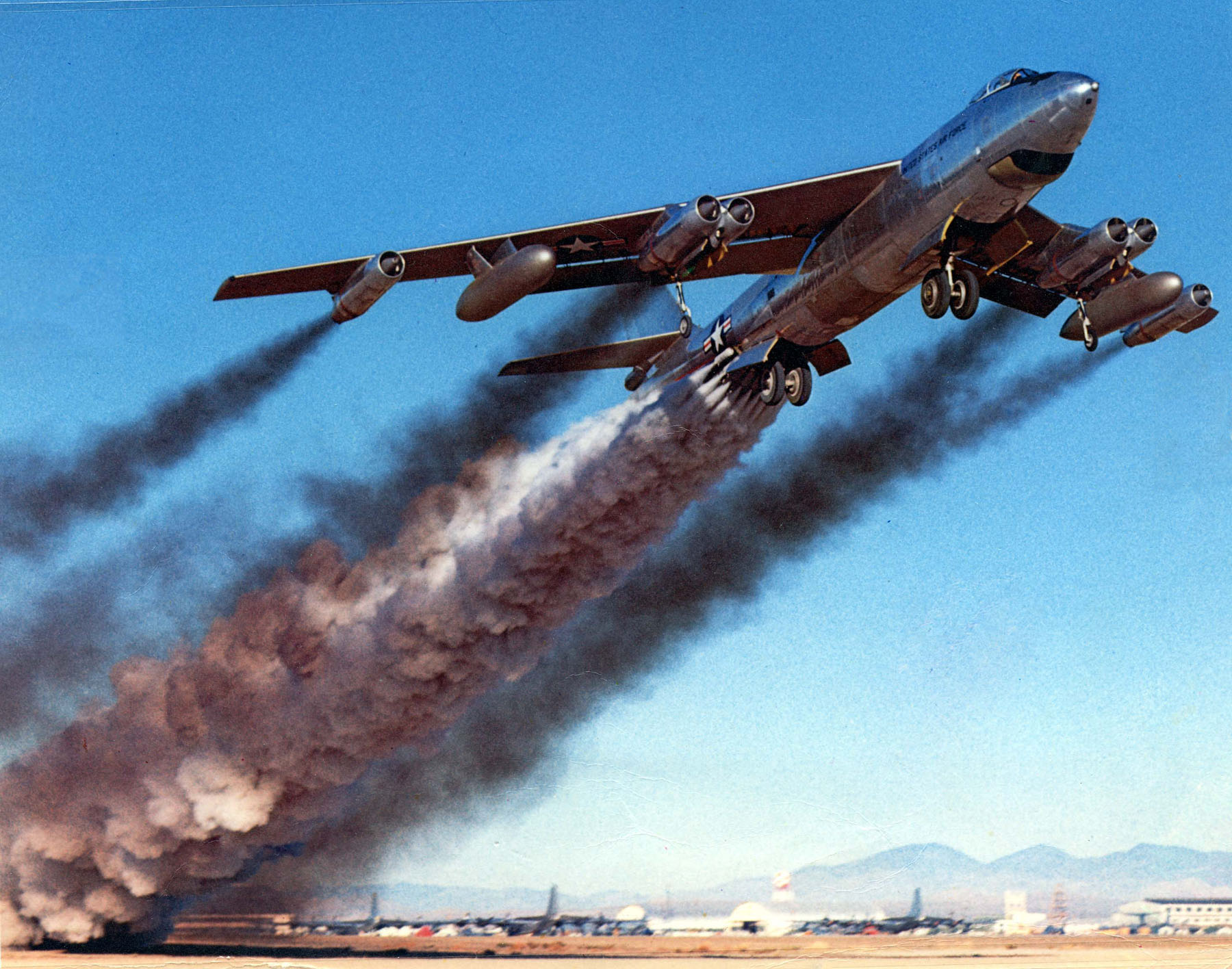
A B-47 takes off using rocket-assisted take off (RATO)

Tibbets then attended the Air Command and Staff School at Maxwell Air Force Base, Alabama. On graduating in 1947 he was posted to the Directorate of Requirements at Air Force Headquarters at the Pentagon. When the head of the directorate, Brigadier General Thomas S. Power, was posted to London as air attaché, he was replaced by Brigadier General Carl Brandt. Brandt appointed Tibbets as director of Directorate of Requirements's Strategic Air Division, which was responsible for drawing up requirements for future bombers. Tibbets was convinced that the bombers of the future would be jet aircraft and thus became involved in the Boeing B-47 Stratojet program. He subsequently served as B-47 project officer at Boeing in Wichita from July 1950 until February 1952. He then became commander of the Proof Test Division at Eglin Air Force Base in Valparaiso, Florida, where flight testing of the B-47 was conducted.

Tibbets returned to Maxwell Air Force Base, where he attended the Air War College. After he graduated in June 1955, he became Director of War Plans at the Allied Air Forces in Central Europe Headquarters at Fontainebleau, France. He left Lucy and his sons behind in Alabama, and he and Lucy divorced that year. During his posting to France, he met a French divorcee named Andrea Quattrehomme, who became his second wife. He returned to the United States in February 1956 to command the 308th Bombardment Wing at Hunter Air Force Base, Georgia, and married her in the base chapel on 4 May 1956. They had a son, James Tibbets.

In January 1958, Tibbets became commander of the 6th Air Division at MacDill Air Force Base, Florida. and was promoted to brigadier general in 1959. This was followed by another tour of duty at the Pentagon as director of Management Analysis. In July 1962, he was assigned to the Joint Chiefs of Staff as deputy director for operations, and then, in June 1963, as deputy director for the National Military Command System. In 1964, Tibbets was named military attaché in India. He spent 22 months there on this posting, which ended in June 1966. He retired from the United States Air Force (USAF) on 31 August 1966.

== Later life and death ==
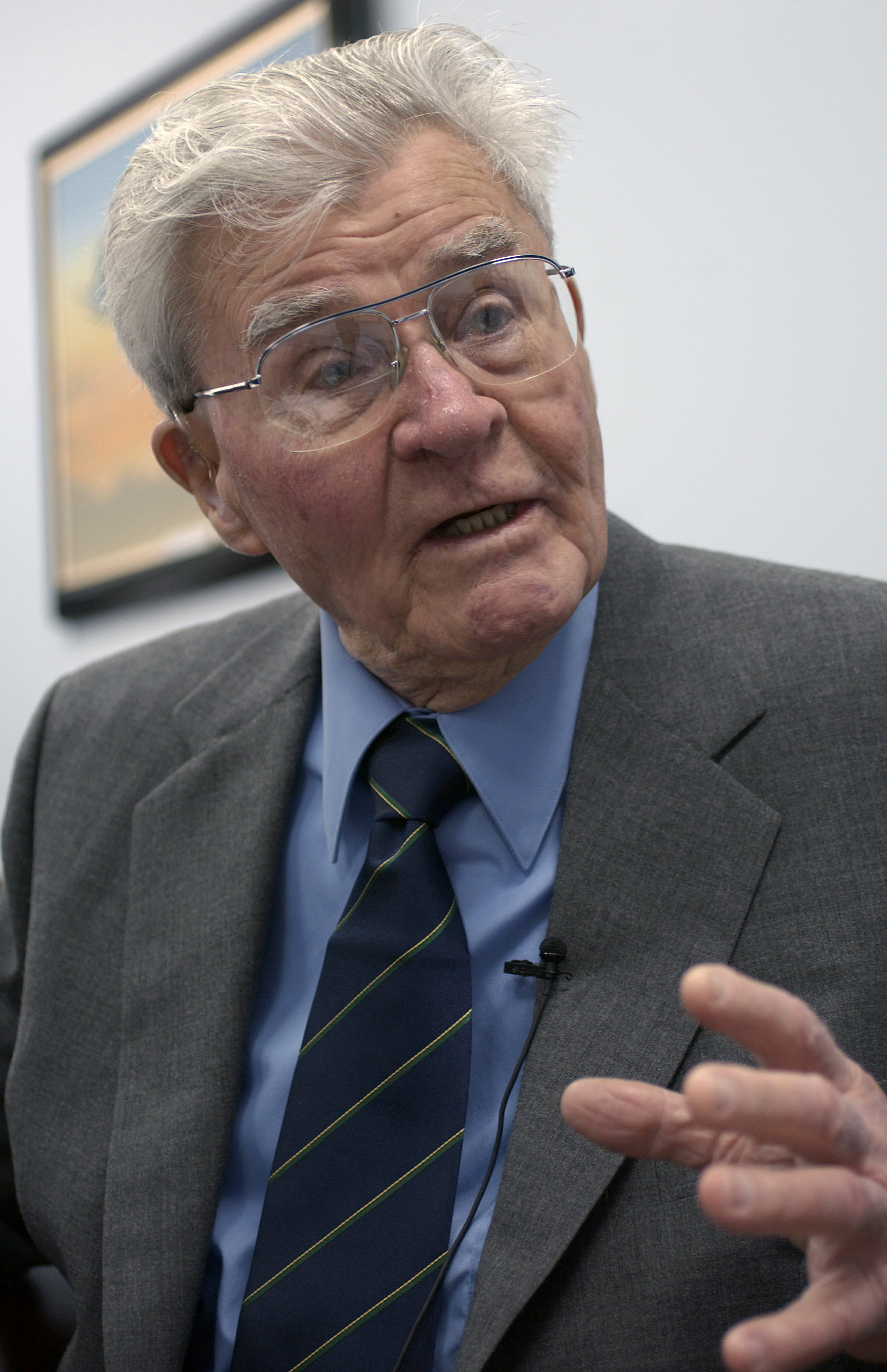
Tibbets in 2003

After his retirement from the Air Force, Tibbets worked for Executive Jet Aviation (EJA), an air taxi company based in Columbus, Ohio, and now called NetJets. He was one of the founding board members and attempted to extend the company's operations to Europe, but was unsuccessful. He retired from the company in 1968, and returned to Miami, Florida, where he had spent part of his childhood. The banks foreclosed on EJA in 1970, and Bruce Sundlun became president. Sundlun lured Tibbets back to EJA that year. Tibbets succeeded Sundlun as president on 21 April 1976, and remained in the role until 1986. He served for a year as a consultant before his second and final retirement from EJA in 1987.

Tibbets died in his Columbus, Ohio, home on 1 November 2007, at the age of 92. He had suffered small strokes and heart failure during his final years and had been in hospice care. He was survived by his French-born wife, Andrea, and two sons from his first marriage, Paul III and Gene as well as his son, James, from his second marriage. Tibbets had asked for no funeral or headstone, because he feared that opponents of the bombing might use it as a place of protest or destruction. In accordance with his wishes, his body was cremated, and his ashes were scattered over the English Channel; he had flown over the Channel many times during the war.

Tibbets' grandson Paul W. Tibbets IV graduated from the United States Air Force Academy in 1989, and in April 2006 became commander of the 393rd Bomb Squadron, flying the B-2 Spirit at Whiteman AFB, Missouri. The squadron was one of the two operational squadrons that had formed part of the 509th Composite Group when Tibbets commanded it. Paul Tibbets IV was promoted to brigadier general in 2014, and became Deputy Director for Nuclear Operations at the Global Operations Directorate of the United States Strategic Command at Offutt Air Force Base in Nebraska. As such, he was responsible for America's strategic nuclear forces. On 5 June 2015, he assumed command of the 509th Bomb Wing.

== Legacy ==
In later life, Tibbets strongly defended the decision to use the atomic bomb on Hiroshima and became a symbolic figure in the debate over their use. At the time of his posting to India, a newspaper denounced him as the "world's greatest killer". In a 1975 interview he said: "I'm proud that I was able to start with nothing, plan it and have it work as perfectly as it did ... I sleep clearly every night". "I knew when I got the assignment", he told a reporter in 2005, "it was going to be an emotional thing. We had feelings, but we had to put them in the background. We knew it was going to kill people right and left. But my one driving interest was to do the best job I could so that we could end the killing as quickly as possible".

In 1976, the United States government apologized to Japan after Tibbets re-enacted the bombing—complete with a mushroom cloud—in a restored B-29 at an air show in Texas. He said that he had not intended for the re-enactment to insult the Japanese people. In 1995, he denounced the 50th-anniversary exhibition of the Enola Gay at the Smithsonian Institution, which attempted to present the bombing in context with the destruction it caused, as a "damn big insult", due to its focus on the Japanese casualties rather than the brutality of the Japanese government. He was inducted into the National Aviation Hall of Fame in 1996.

== Awards and decorations ==

USAF Command pilot badge
Distinguished Service Cross
Legion of Merit	Distinguished Flying Cross with bronze oak leaf cluster	Purple Heart
Air Medal with three bronze oak leaf clusters	Joint Service Commendation Medal	Army Commendation Medal
Air Force Outstanding Unit Award with Valor device and bronze oak leaf cluster	American Defense Service Medal	American Campaign Medal
European-African-Middle Eastern Campaign Medal with three bronze campaign stars	Asiatic-Pacific Campaign Medal with two bronze campaign stars	World War II Victory Medal
National Defense Service Medal with bronze service star	Air Force Longevity Service Award with silver and bronze oak leaf clusters	Small Arms Expert Marksmanship Ribbon

Source: Ohio History Central.

=== Distinguished Service Cross citation ===

Tibbets, Paul W.
Colonel (Air Corps), U.S. Army Air Forces
393d Bombardment Squadron, 509th Composite Wing, Twentieth Air Force
Date of Action: 6 August 1945

Citation:

The President of the United States of America, authorized by Act of Congress 9 July 1918, takes pleasure in presenting the Distinguished Service Cross to Colonel (Air Corps) Paul Warfield Tibbets, Jr., United States Army Air Forces, for extraordinary heroism in connection with military operations against an armed enemy while serving as Pilot of a B-29 Very Heavy Bomber in the 393d Bombardment Squadron, 509th Composite Group (VH), Twentieth Air force, while participating in a bombing mission on 6 August 1945, over Japan. On this date Colonel Tibbets flew a B-29 type aircraft in a daring daylight strike against the city of Hiroshima on the main island of Honshu, Japan, from a base in the Marianas Islands carrying for the first time a type of bomb totally new to modern warfare. Flying the 1,500 miles of open water to the coast of Japan, he guided his plane over the island of Shikoku and the Inland Sea, threatened with the constant danger of anti-aircraft. He successfully dropped his bomb upon reaching the Target city, this single attack being the culmination of many months of tireless effort, training and organization unique in the Army Air Forces history, during which he constantly coped with new problems in precision bombing and engineering. The result of this attack was tremendous damage to the city of Hiroshima, contributing materially to the effectiveness of our strikes against the enemy. By extraordinary flying skill, gallant leadership, and successful performance of the flight despite considerable danger, Colonel Tibbets thereby rendered outstanding, distinguished and valorous service to our Nation.

== In popular culture ==
Barry Nelson played Tibbets in the film The Beginning or the End (1947). Above and Beyond (1952) depicted the World War II events that involved Tibbets; Robert Taylor starred as Tibbets and Eleanor Parker played the role of his first wife Lucy. Tibbets was also the model for screenwriter Sy Bartlett's fictional character "Major Joe Cobb" in the film Twelve O'Clock High (1949) who was portrayed by John Kellogg, and for a brief period in February 1949 was slated to be the film's technical advisor until his replacement at the last minute by Colonel John H. deRussy. Enola Gay: The Men, the Mission, the Atomic Bomb, a 1980 made-for-television movie, somewhat fictionalized, told the story of Tibbets crew. Patrick Duffy played Tibbets and Kim Darby played Lucy.

In other fictional portrayals, Nicholas Kilbertus was Tibbets in the film Day One (1989), David Gow played him in the TV movie Hiroshima (1995), and Ian Shaw played the part in the BBC's TV docudrama Hiroshima (2005), for which Tibbets was also interviewed on camera. An interview with Tibbets also appeared in the movie Atomic Cafe (1982), as well as was in the 1970s British documentary series The World at War, and the "Men Who Brought the Dawn" episode of the Smithsonian Networks' War Stories (1995). Tibbets figured largely in the 2000 book Duty: A Father, His Son and the Man Who Won the War by Bob Greene of the Chicago Tribune. In 1989, he published his memoir Flight of the Enola Gay which chronicles his life to that date.
