= Air Force Installation Contracting Center =

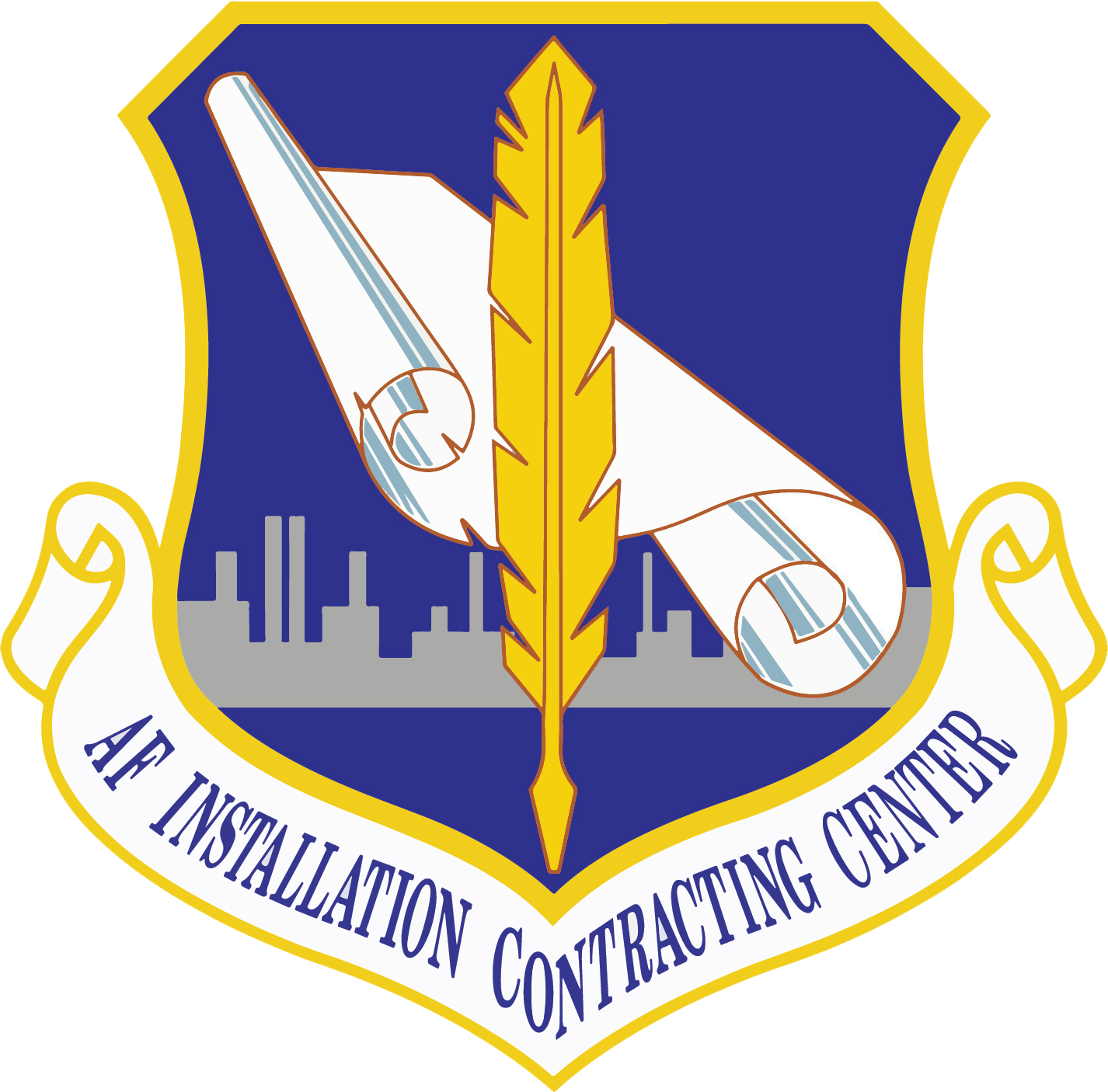
- Air Force Installation Contracting Center emblem
- Active: 28 Oct 2010–present
- Country: United States
- Branch: United States Air Force
- Part of: Air Force Installation and Mission Support Center
- Garrison/HQ: Wright-Patterson Air Force Base
- Decorations: ASOEA

Commanders
- Current commander: Brig Gen Constance H. Young

Insignia
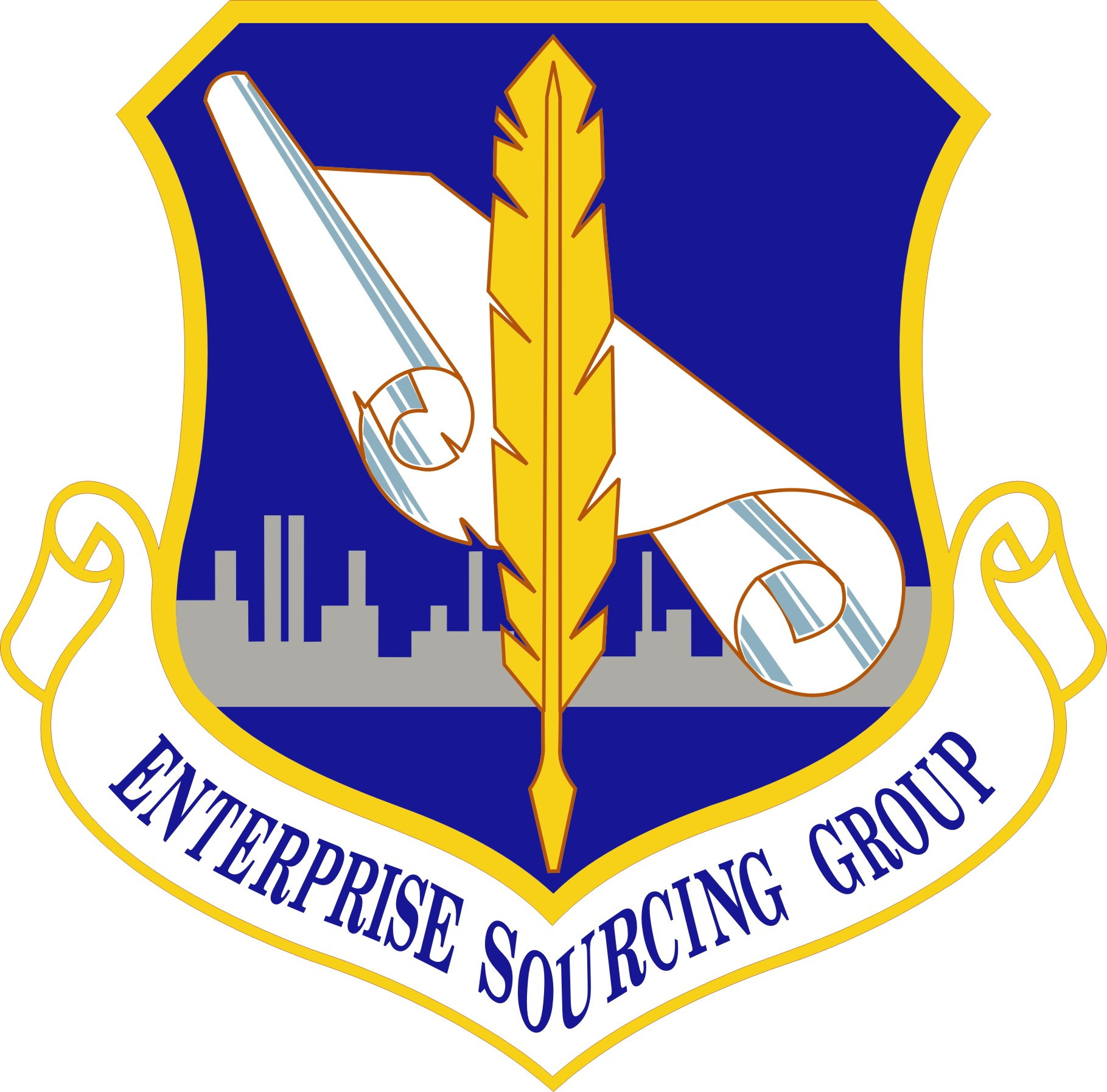
- Enterprise Sourcing Group 2010–2013

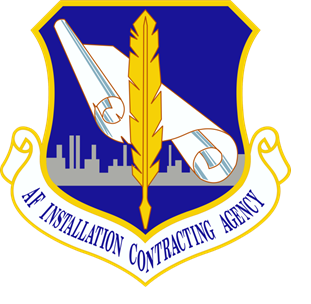
- Air Force Installation Contracting Agency 2013–2019

The Air Force Installation Contracting Center (AFICC), located at Wright-Patterson Air Force Base, Ohio, is a primary subordinate unit assigned to the Air Force Installation and Mission Support Center, which is one of six centers aligned under Air Force Materiel Command for the United States Air Force. The AFICC is responsible for managing and executing above-wing level operational acquisition across the Department of the Air Force enterprise. Their ten focus areas for enterprise contracting are: information technology, professional services, security & protection, facilities & construction, industrial products & services, office management, transportation & logistics services, travel & lodging, and medical.

== History ==
The Air Force Installation Contracting Center can trace its lineage to the Air Force Contract Management Division, which was activated on 18 Dec 1964 and became part of the Air Force Systems Command on 4 Jan 1965, being headquartered at Los Angeles Air Force Base, California. The unit was moved to Kirtland Air Force Base, New Mexico on 31 Oct 1972. On 15 Mar 1989 it was briefly redesignated to simply "Contract Management Division" before being inactivated on 30 Jun 1990. The unit was reactivated as the Enterprise Sourcing Group on 28 Oct 2010 at Wright-Patterson Air Force Base, Ohio as a direct reporting unit to Air Force Materiel Command. On 1 Oct 2013, the Enterprise Sourcing Group was redesignated to the Air Force Installation Contracting Agency and made a Field Operating Agency of the Air Force. The agency was converted from a field operating agency back to a subordinate unit of Air Force Material Command on 1 Oct 2014. The Air Force Installation and Mission Support Center was established on 6 April 2015, and the Air Force Installation Contracting Agency become one of its subordinates along with: the Air Force Civil Engineer Center, Air Force Security Forces Center, Air Force Services Activity, Air Force Financial Services Center, and the Air Force Financial Management Center of Expertise. On 1 Jun 2019, the Air Force Installation Contracting Agency was redesignated to the Air Force Installation Contracting Center.

== Organization ==
The Air Force Installation Contracting Center is led by a Brigadier General and is composed of six staff directorates, eight squadrons, two flights, and nine operating locations with some of these being geographically separate units.

Some of these subordinate units are specifically focused on providing enterprise contracting support to a designated major command and each of its subordinate contracting squadrons.

The center is currently estimated to have around 750 personnel.

- Air Force Installation Contracting Center (Wright-Patterson Air Force Base)
  - Acquisition Support Directorate (KP)
  - Contingency Contracting Directorate (KQ)
  - Enterprise Solutions Support Directorate (KA)
  - Personnel & Resources Directorate (KX)
  - Resource Management Directorate (RM)
  - Small Business Directorate (SB)
  - 771st Enterprise Sourcing Squadron
  - 772nd Enterprise Sourcing Squadron (JBSA-Lackland)
  - 773rd Enterprise Sourcing Squadron (JBSA-Lackland)
  - 774th Enterprise Sourcing Squadron (Offutt Air Force Base)
  - Operating Location ACC (KC) (Joint Base Langley–Eustis) – Air Combat Command Support
  - Operating Location USSF (KS) (Peterson Space Force Base) – United States Space Force Support
  - Operating Location AFGSC (KG) (Barksdale Air Force Base) – Air Force Global Strike Command Support
    - 767th Enterprise Sourcing Flight
  - Operating Location PACAF (KH) (Joint Base Pearl Harbor–Hickam) – Pacific Air Forces Support
    - 766th Enterprise Sourcing Squadron
  - Operating Location AMC (KM) (Scott Air Force Base) – Air Mobility Command Support
    - 763rd Enterprise Sourcing Squadron
  - Operating Location USAFE (KU) (Ramstein Air Base) – United States Air Forces in Europe – Air Forces Africa Support
    - 764th Enterprise Sourcing Squadron
  - Operating Location AETC (KT) (JBSA-Randolph) – Air Education and Training Command Support
    - 338th Enterprise Sourcing Squadron
  - Operating Location AFSOC (KO) (Hurlburt Field) – Air Force Special Operations Command Support
    - 765th Enterprise Sourcing Flight

== Stations ==
- Los Angeles Air Force Base, Los Angeles, California, 4 Jan 1965 – 31 Oct 1972
- Kirtland Air Force Base, Albuquerque, New Mexico, 31 Oct 1972 – 30 June 1990
- Wright-Patterson Air Force Base, Dayton, Ohio, 28 Oct 2010–present

== List of commanders ==
| No. | Commander | | Term | | |
| No. | Portrait | Name | Took office | Left office | Term length |
|---|---|---|---|---|---|
| 1 | Lance R. French | Brig Gen; Lance R. French | 1 August 2022 | Incumbent | 4 years, 102 days |

== Decorations ==
- Air and Space Organizational Excellence Award
  - 1 Jan 1985-31 Dec 1986 (As Air Force Contract Management Division)
  - 1 Jan 1988-31 Dec 1989 (As Contract Management Division)
  - 1 Jun 2011–31 Dec 2012 (As Enterprise Sourcing Group)
