= Air Force Financial Services Center =

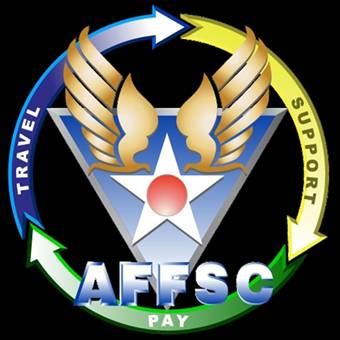
- Air Force Financial Services Center logo
- Active: 14 September 2007 - c. 2018
- Branch: United States Air Force
- Type: Field Operating Agency
- Role: Financial Management Operations
- Garrison/HQ: Ellsworth Air Force Base, South Dakota

The Air Force Financial Services Center (AFFSC) was a Field Operating Agency of the United States Air Force. The center was located at Ellsworth Air Force Base in Rapid City, South Dakota. Its mission was to centrally process all military pay and travel pay transactions for the Air Force, and to answer financial services questions from Air Force personnel 24 hours a day, 7 days a week. The commander of the Air Force Financial Services Center reported to the Deputy Assistant Secretary of the Air Force for Financial Operations in The Pentagon.

== History ==
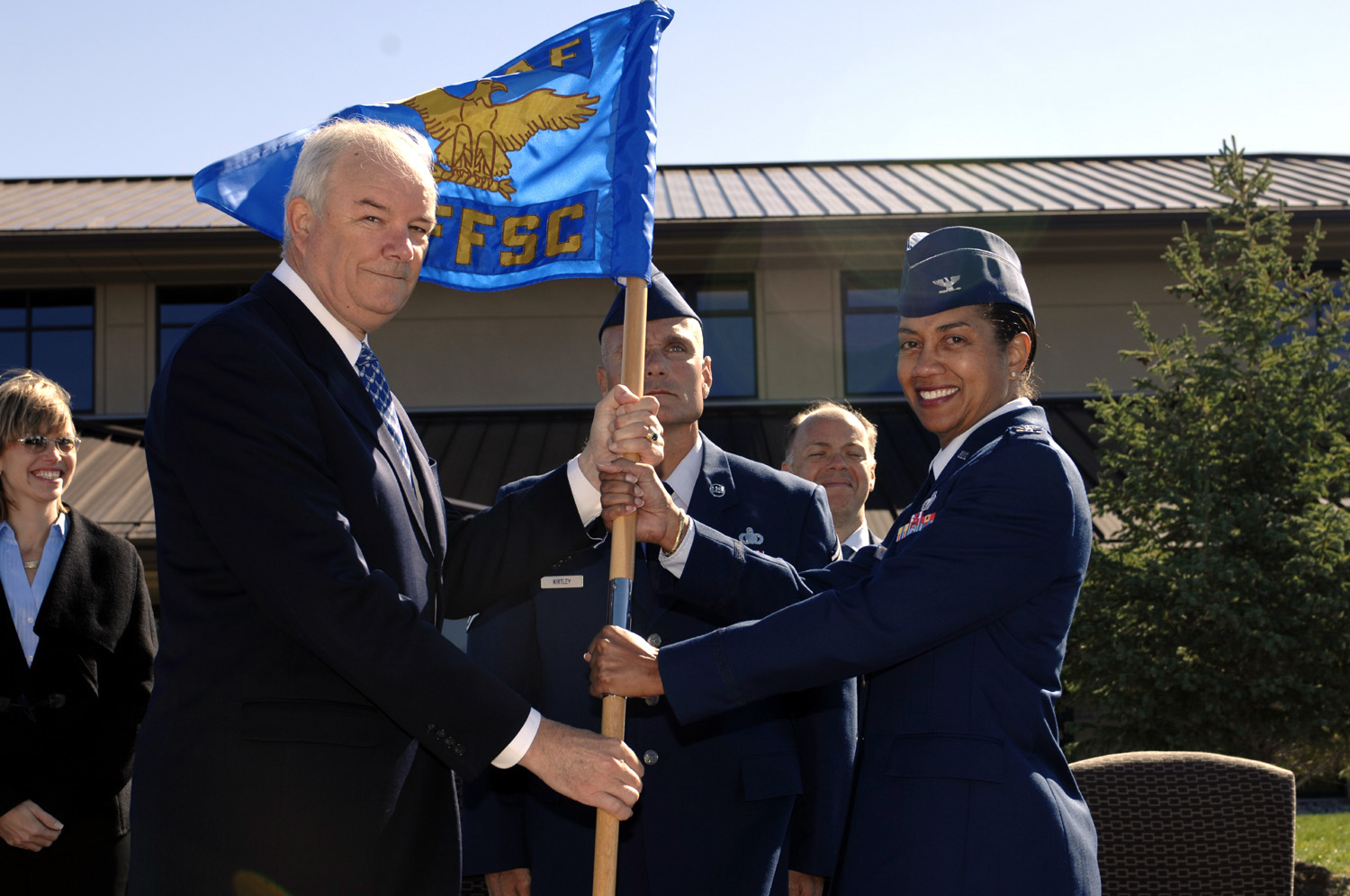
Colonel Judy Perry accepts Air Force Financial Services Center Guidon from Secretary of the Air Force Michael Wynne

The Financial Services Center was opened on 14 September 2007 by Secretary of the Air Force Michael Wynne. The ribbon-cutting ceremony was attended by United States Senator John Thune, Congresswoman Stephanie Herseth Sandlin, senior Air Force official, and Rapid City civic leaders. The center's first commander was Colonel Judy Perry.

The Air Force selected Ellsworth Air Force Base as the site for its finance center from more than 80 candidate locations. It was chosen because the base had existing facilities with 110,000 square feet (10,000 m^{2}) of available floor space as well as good force protection and communications infrastructure. In addition, the area's cost of living, low risk for natural disasters, and generally friendly atmosphere also were considered in the site selection decision.

In October 2014, the Air Force Financial Services Center was aligned with the Air Force Installation and Mission Support Center, becoming one of its primary subordinate units, along with the Air Force Civil Engineer Center, Air Force Services Center, Air Force Security Forces Center, Air Force Installation Contracting Center, and the Air Force Financial Management Center of Expertise. In 2018, the "AFIMSC 2.0" initiative incorporated the Air Force Financial Services Center and Air Force Financial Management Center of Expertise into AFIMSC's Resources Directorate, formally inactivating the units.

== Personnel ==
An initial cadre of approximately 50 non-commissioned officers, arrived in April 2007. When fully staffed, the center had 775 Airmen and civilian employees. The current personnel makeup is 80 percent military and 20 percent civilian. However, the Air Force plans to slowly shift the staffing mix to achieve a majority civilian work force by 2014. All military personnel assigned to the center are trained for contingency operations and support expeditionary Air Force deployments.

== Facilities ==
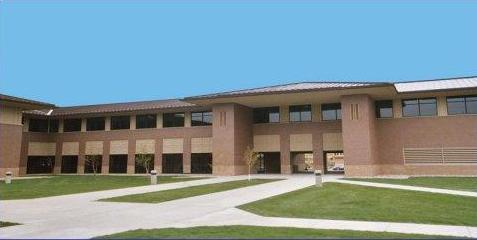
Air Force Financial Services Center's operations building

The center consisted of three buildings located on Ellsworth Air Force Base. The main building housed the financial transaction processing operations group and the customer service contact center. This building was originally the base military education and testing center. The finance center also included a separate state-of-the-art technology facility and a small military headquarters building adjacent to the main building. This building was the base community center prior to being gutted and remodeled.

== Financial Operations ==
Activation of the Financial Services Center was the second largest financial management transformation initiative in Air Force history (second only to the centralization of military pay processing to the Joint Uniform Military Pay System (JUMPS) by the Air Force in 1974). The Air Force consolidated financial services into a single center to increase efficiency and reduce operating costs needed to deliver the financial services to Airmen. The center's centralized transaction processing and customer service contact center reduced these tasks from 93 base finance offices located at Air Force installations around the world. This reduced the total number of Air Force personnel needed to process pay transactions and respond to customer inquires by 600.

The center was modeled on private sector customer service operations. Its streamlined transaction was predicted to save the Air Force $210 million in basic operating costs over a ten-year period.

Contact center personnel are trained to resolve a multitude of common finance issues. This allowed Air Force personnel to make inquiries and resolve pay issues at the customer's convenience. More complicated pay matters are routed to the appropriate department within the center so functional experts can research and resolve the problem. This approach ensured each problem is effectively addressed.
