= 1st Delta Operations Squadron =

U.S. Space Force unit

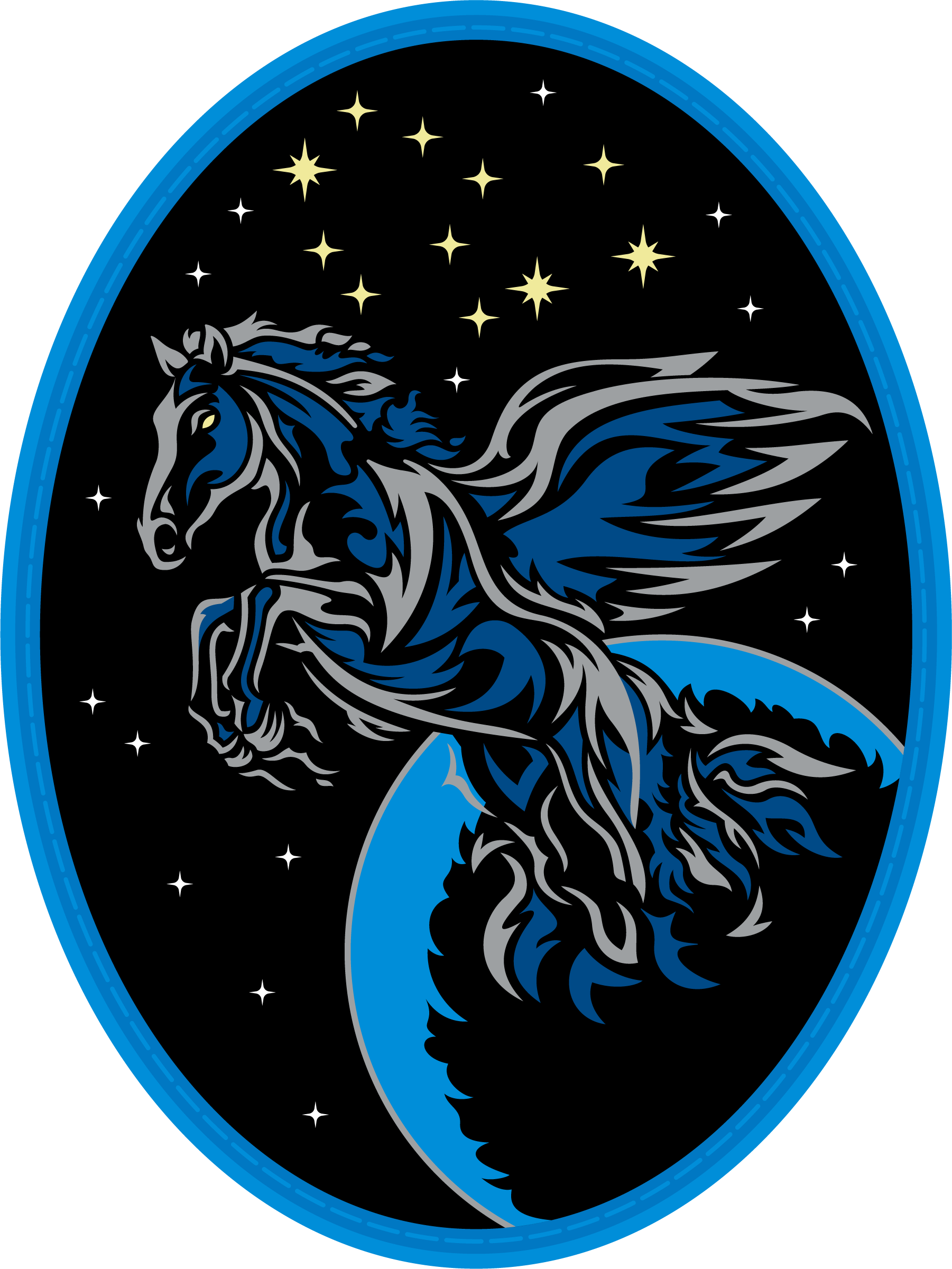
- 1 DOS emblem
- Active: 2 September 2021–11 April 2025
- Country: United States
- Branch: United States Space Force
- Type: Squadron
- Role: Operations support
- Part of: Space Delta 1
- Headquarters: Vandenberg Space Force Base, California, U.S.

Commanders
- Commander: Lt Col Stephanie N. Mitchell

The 1st Delta Operations Squadron (1 DOS) was a United States Space Force unit responsible for providing operations support to Space Delta 1 by serving as its headquarters staff. It also has a detachment that runs the service's basic military training. It was activated on 2 September 2021 and was located at Vandenberg Space Force Base, California. The squadron was inactivated on April 11, 2025.

== Structure ==
- Detachment 1, Joint Base San Antonio-Lackland, Texas

== List of commanders ==
- Lt Col Tara B. Brewer Shea, 2 September 2021 – 30 June 2023
- Lt Col Stephanie N. Mitchell, 30 June 2023 – 11 April 2025

== See also ==
- Space Delta 1
