= Air Force Installation and Mission Support Center =

AFIMSC
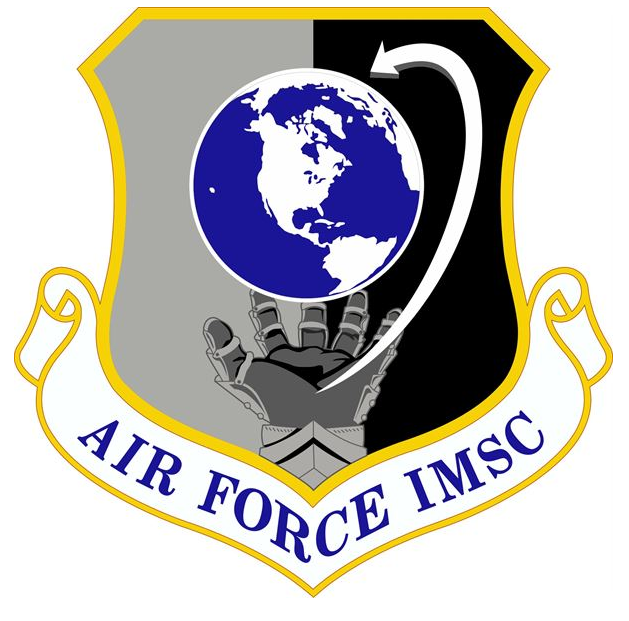
- Shield of AFIMSC
- Active: 6 April 2015 - present (11 years, 6 months)
- Country: United States of America
- Branch: United States Air Force
- Headquarters: JBSA-Lackland, Texas
- Website: https://www.afimsc.af.mil/

Commanders
- Commander: Maj Gen Thomas P. Sherman
- Deputy Commander: Col Steven N. Lamb
- Command Chief Master Sergeant: CCM Ronnie J. Woods

The Air Force Installation and Mission Support Center (AFIMSC), headquartered at Joint Base San Antonio-Lackland (JBSA-Lackland), Texas, is one of six centers aligned under Air Force Materiel Command for the United States Air Force. AFIMSC serves as the single intermediate-level headquarters responsible for providing installation and mission support to 77 Air Force installations, nine major commands and two direct reporting units with an annual budget of approximately $10 billion. The center comprises four directorates, 10 detachments, and four primary subordinate units, or PSUs. The AFIMSC cross-functional team provides globally integrated management, resourcing and combat support operations for Airmen and family services, base communications, chaplain, civil engineering, contracting, logistics readiness, public affairs, security forces and financial management programs.

== History ==
In 2013, United States Secretary of Defense Chuck Hagel directed service secretaries and chiefs to find inefficiencies across their headquarters organizations that will save 20 percent in total operating budgets. Then-Secretary of the Air Force Michael B. Donley and Chief of Staff of the Air Force Mark Welsh challenged their staffs to identify options to reduce overhead costs, increase efficiencies, eliminate redundant activities, and improve effectiveness and business processes to help meet the 20 percent reduction target.

The center was announced on 11 July 2014 as a result of Chuck Hagel's direction. Joint Base Andrews, Maryland served as the temporary headquarters during the base selection process. Joint Base San Antonio, Texas was selected to host AFIMSC Headquarters in January 2015, in large part due to 50 percent of AFIMSC's personnel resided at that base.

The center was activated on 6 April 2015 and reached initial operating capability on 1 Oct. 2015 and full operational capability in October 2016. The Air Force moved several field operating agencies under AFIMSC, including the Air Force Security Forces Center, Air Force Civil Engineer Center, Air Force Services Activity, Air Force Financial Management Center of Expertise, Air Force Financial Services Center, and Air Force Installation Contracting Agency.

Maj. Gen. Theresa Carter was announced as the center's provisional commander. General Carter previously served as the special assistant to the commander of AFMC, developing the strategy and implementation plan for the AFIMSC.

In September 2022, AFIMSC announced it would be transitioning to an A-Staff structure at its headquarters level. The A-Staff design reached initial operating capability by Fall of 2023, and assumed a full operational in 2024.

It was stated that "adopting an A-Staff at AFIMSC will help the center better integrate across the Department of the Air Force to support broader I&MS policy and strategy implementation, as well as rebalance internally to focus more on strategy and planning."

== Units ==
With headquarters at Joint Base San Antonio-Lackland, Texas, AFIMSC, by virtue of its global mission, has operating locations at more than 140 locations around the world. AFIMSC has four primary subordinate units: Air Force Civil Engineer Center, Air Force Installation Contracting Center, Air Force Security Forces Center, and Air Force Services Center.

The center also has 10 detachments that support Space Force headquarters, Air Force major commands and Air Force District of Washington.

== List of commanders ==
No.	Commander		Term			Ref.
No.	Portrait	Name	Took office	Left office	Term length	Ref.
1	Theresa C. Carter	Major General; Theresa C. Carter	8 August 2014	22 July 2016	1 year, 349 days	
2	Bradley D. Spacy	Major General; Bradley D. Spacy	22 July 2016	25 July 2019	3 years, 3 days	
3	John T. Wilcox	Major General; John T. Wilcox	25 July 2019	12 August 2022	3 years, 18 days	
4	John J. Allen	Major General; John J. Allen	12 August 2022	14 August 2025	4 years, 60 days	-
5	Thomas P. Sherman	Major General; Thomas P. Sherman	14 August 2025	Incumbent	1 year, 58 days	-
