= Michael Lutton =

U.S. Air Force general

Michael J. Lutton
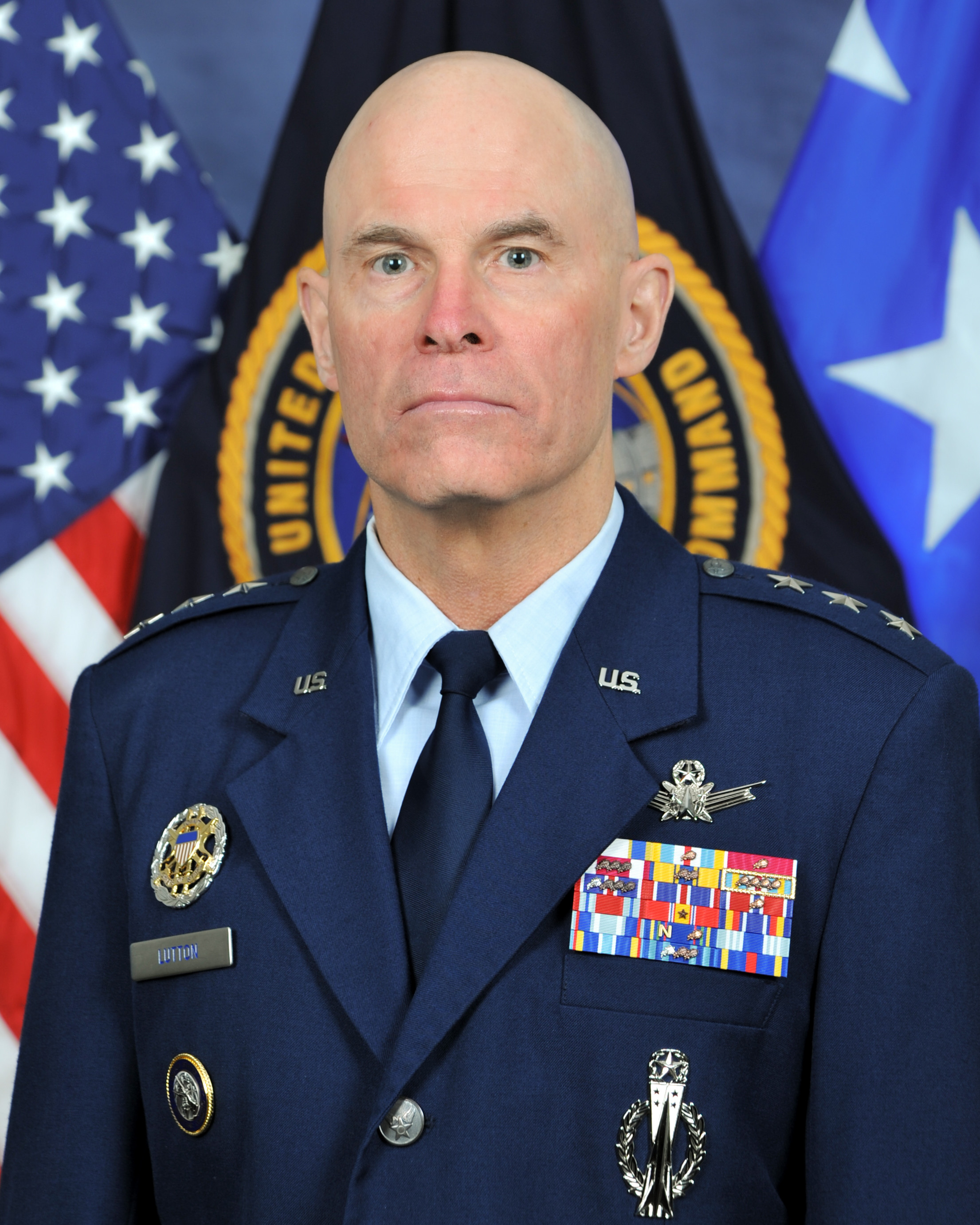
- Official portrait, 2025
- Military career
- Allegiance: United States
- Branch: United States Air Force
- Service years: 1990–present
- Rank: Lieutenant General
- Commands: Twentieth Air Force; 91st Missile Wing; 381st Training Group; 328th Weapons Squadron
- Awards: Defense Superior Service Medal; Legion of Merit (2)

Michael J. Lutton is a United States Air Force lieutenant general who has served as the deputy commander of the United States Strategic Command since 5 December 2025. He previously served as deputy commander of Air Force Global Strike Command.

In July 2023, Lutton was nominated for promotion to lieutenant general and assignment as deputy commander of Air Force Global Strike Command.

Military offices
Preceded by Robert Vercher	Commander of the 91st Missile Wing; 2014–2016	Succeeded by Collin J. Connor
Preceded by Stephen L. Davis	Principal Assistant Deputy Administrator for Military Applications of the National Nuclear Security Administration; 2016–2018	Succeeded by Ronald G. Allen
Preceded by James C. Dawkins	Deputy Director for Nuclear and Homeland Defense Operations of the Joint Staff; 2018–2020	Succeeded by Collin J. Connor
Preceded by Ferdinand Stoss	Commander of the Twentieth Air Force; 2020–2024	Succeeded by Stacy Jo Huser
Preceded by Mark E. Weatherington	Deputy Commander of Air Force Global Strike Command; 2024–2025	Succeeded by Jason Armagost
Preceded by Richard A. Correll	Deputy Commander of the United States Strategic Command; 2025–present	Incumbent
