= General Wilcox =

General Wilcox may refer to:

- Cadmus M. Wilcox (1824–1890), Confederate States Army major general
- John T. Wilcox (fl. 1990s–2020s), U.S. Air Force major general
