= Anthony Cotton =

Anthony Cotton may refer to:

- Antony Cotton (born 1975), English actor
- Anthony J. Cotton, United States Air Force general
