= Leadership of the United States Strategic Command =

U.S. Strategic Command leadership

Seal of the United States Strategic Command

This is a list of all commanders, deputy commanders, senior enlisted leaders, and chiefs of staff of the United States Strategic Command.

== Current combatant command staff ==
- Richard A. Correll, Commander
  - Michael J. Lutton, Deputy Commander
    - James D. Turinetti IV, Chief of Staff
      - Ryan E. Richardson, Director, Human Capital (J1)
      - Ralph R. Smith III, Director, Intelligence (J2)
      - Brandon D. Parker, Director, Global Operations (J3)
        - Glenn T. Harris, Deputy Director, Global Operations
      - John French, Director, Logistics (J4)
      - Thomas R. Buchanan, Director, Plans and Policy (J5)
        - John W. Weidner, Deputy Director, Plans
        - Mark D. Behning, Deputy Director, Strategic Targeting and Nuclear Mission Planning (J5N)
      - Elizabeth M. Durham-Ruiz, Director, Command, Control, Communications, and Computer (C4) Systems (J6)
      - Jeffery B. Miller, Director, Joint Exercises, Training, and Assessments (J7)
      - Robert J. Taylor, Director, Capability and Resource Integration (J8)

== List of leaders of the United States Strategic Command ==
=== Commanders ===
Commander of the United States Strategic Command
- Emblem of the United States Strategic Command

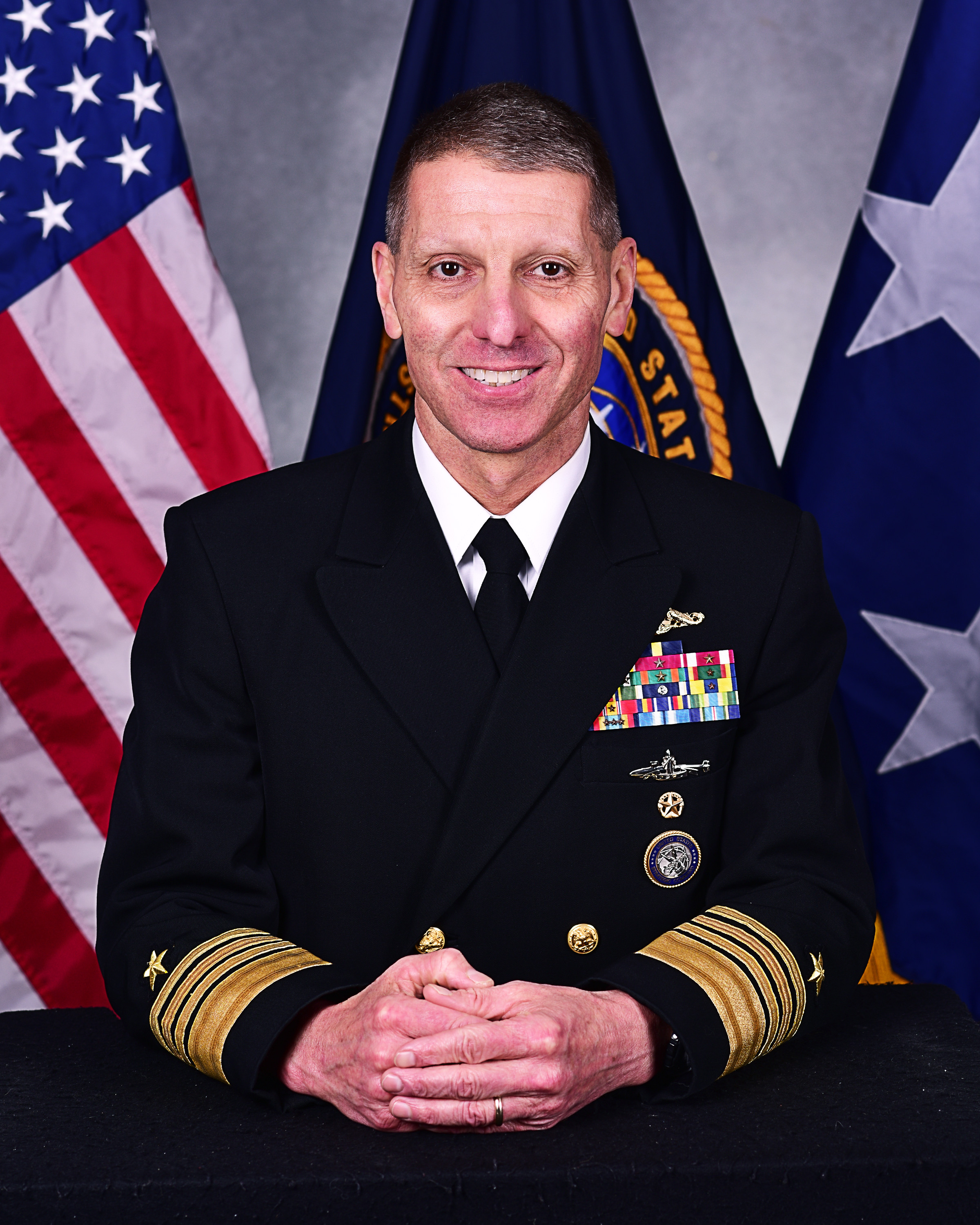
- Incumbent; Admiral Richard A. Correll, USN since 5 December 2025
- United States Department of Defense
- Type: Unified combatant commander
- Abbreviation: CDRUSSTRATCOM
- Reports to: President of the United States; Secretary of Defense
- Seat: Offutt Air Force Base, Nebraska, U.S.
- Nominator: Secretary of Defense
- Appointer: The president; with Senate advice and consent
- Term length: 2–3 years; (approx.)
- Constituting instrument: 10 U.S.C. § 164
- Formation: 1 June 1992
- First holder: George L. Butler
- Deputy: Deputy Commander, United States Strategic Command

No.	Commander		Term			Service branch
No.	Portrait	Name	Took office	Left office	Term length	Service branch
1	George L. Butler	General; George L. Butler (born 1939)	1 June 1992	14 February 1994	1 year, 258 days	U.S. Air Force
2	Henry G. Chiles Jr.	Admiral; Henry G. Chiles Jr. (born 1938)	14 February 1994	21 February 1996	2 years, 7 days	U.S. Navy
3	Eugene E. Habiger	General; Eugene E. Habiger (1939–2022)	21 February 1996	1 August 1998	2 years, 161 days	U.S. Air Force
4	Richard W. Mies	Admiral; Richard W. Mies (born 1944)	1 August 1998	30 November 2001	3 years, 121 days	U.S. Navy
5	James O. Ellis Jr.	Admiral; James O. Ellis Jr. (born 1947)	30 November 2001	9 July 2004	2 years, 222 days	U.S. Navy
-	James E. Cartwright	Lieutenant General; James E. Cartwright (born 1949); Acting	9 July 2004	1 September 2004	54 days	U.S. Marine Corps
6	James E. Cartwright	General; James E. Cartwright (born 1949)	1 September 2004	10 August 2007	2 years, 343 days	U.S. Marine Corps
-	C. Robert Kehler	Lieutenant General; C. Robert Kehler (born 1952); Acting	10 August 2007	3 October 2007	54 days	U.S. Air Force
7	Kevin P. Chilton	General; Kevin P. Chilton (born 1954)	3 October 2007	28 January 2011	3 years, 117 days	U.S. Air Force
8	C. Robert Kehler	General; C. Robert Kehler (born 1952)	28 January 2011	15 November 2013	2 years, 291 days	U.S. Air Force
9	Cecil D. Haney	Admiral; Cecil D. Haney (born 1955)	15 November 2013	3 November 2016	2 years, 354 days	U.S. Navy
10	John E. Hyten	General; John E. Hyten (born 1959)	3 November 2016	18 November 2019	3 years, 15 days	U.S. Air Force
11	Charles A. Richard	Admiral; Charles A. Richard (born 1959)	18 November 2019	9 December 2022	3 years, 21 days	U.S. Navy
12	Anthony J. Cotton	General; Anthony J. Cotton	9 December 2022	5 December 2025	2 years, 361 days	U.S. Air Force
13	Richard A. Correll	Admiral; Richard A. Correll	5 December 2025	Incumbent	322 days	U.S. Navy

=== Deputy commanders ===
No.	Deputy Commander		Term			Service branch
No.	Portrait	Name	Took office	Left office	Term length	Service branch
1	Michael Colley	Vice Admiral; Michael Colley (1938–2013)	1 June 1992	23 September 1993	1 year, 114 days	U.S. Navy
2	Henry G. Chiles Jr.	Vice Admiral; Henry G. Chiles Jr. (born 1938)	24 September 1993	~14 February 1994	~143 days	U.S. Navy
3	Arlen D. Jameson	Lieutenant General; Arlen D. Jameson	24 June 1994	29 February 1996	1 year, 250 days	U.S. Air Force
4	Dennis A. Jones	Vice Admiral; Dennis A. Jones	10 March 1996	13 August 1998	2 years, 156 days	U.S. Navy
5	Phillip J. Ford	Lieutenant General; Phillip J. Ford	17 August 1998	2 June 2000	1 year, 290 days	U.S. Air Force
6	Robert C. Hinson	Lieutenant General; Robert C. Hinson	11 June 2000	16 April 2002	1 year, 309 days	U.S. Air Force
7	Thomas B. Goslin Jr.	Lieutenant General; Thomas B. Goslin Jr.	17 April 2002	~May 2005	~3 years, 28 days	U.S. Air Force
8	C. Robert Kehler	Lieutenant General; C. Robert Kehler (born 1952)	May 2005	~12 October 2007	~2 years, 153 days	U.S. Air Force
9	Carl V. Mauney	Vice Admiral; Carl V. Mauney (born 1953)	15 October 2007	28 October 2010	3 years, 13 days	U.S. Navy
10	Cecil D. Haney	Vice Admiral; Cecil D. Haney (born 1955)	4 November 2010	~December 2011	~1 year, 41 days	U.S. Navy
11	Timothy Giardina	Vice Admiral; Timothy Giardina (born 1963)	December 2011	September 2013	~1 year, 274 days	U.S. Navy
12	James Kowalski	Lieutenant General; James Kowalski (born 1957)	~23 October 2013	~28 July 2015	~1 year, 278 days	U.S. Air Force
13	Stephen W. Wilson	Lieutenant General; Stephen W. Wilson (born 1959/1960)	~28 July 2015	~22 July 2016	~360 days	U.S. Air Force
–	Richard J. Evans III	Major General; Richard J. Evans III; Acting	~22 July 2016	September 2016	~55 days	U.S. Air Force
14	Charles A. Richard	Vice Admiral; Charles A. Richard (born 1959)	September 2016	~18 June 2018	~1 year, 276 days	U.S. Navy
15	David Kriete	Vice Admiral; David Kriete (born 1963)	~18 June 2018	~20 April 2020	~1 year, 307 days	U.S. Navy
16	Thomas A. Bussiere	Lieutenant General; Thomas A. Bussiere (born 1963)	~20 April 2020	1 December 2022	~2 years, 225 days	U.S. Air Force
17	Richard A. Correll	Vice Admiral; Richard A. Correll (born 1964)	1 December 2022	5 December 2025	3 years, 4 days	U.S. Navy
18	Michael J. Lutton	Lieutenant General; Michael J. Lutton (born c. 1968)	5 December 2025	Incumbent	322 days	U.S. Air Force

=== Senior enlisted leaders ===
No.	Senior enlisted leader		Term			Service branch
No.	Portrait	Name	Took office	Left office	Term length	Service branch
1	Richard S. Ford	Master Chief; Richard S. Ford	~November 2000	~August 2004	~3 years, 274 days	U.S. Navy
2	William N. Nissen	Fleet Master Chief; William N. Nissen	~August 2004	~June 2008	~3 years, 305 days	U.S. Navy
3	Thomas S. Narofsky	Chief Master Sergeant; Thomas S. Narofsky	June 2008	~22 August 2011	~3 years, 68 days	U.S. Air Force
4	Patrick Z. Alston	Command Sergeant Major; Patrick Z. Alston	~22 August 2011	May 2016	~4 years, 267 days	U.S. Army
5	Patrick F. McMahon	Chief Master Sergeant; Patrick F. McMahon	May 2016	~9 September 2020	~4 years, 117 days	U.S. Air Force
6	John J. Perryman	Fleet Master Chief; John J. Perryman	~9 September 2020	~1 October 2021	~1 year, 22 days	U.S. Navy
7	Howard L. Kreamer	Sergeant Major; Howard L. Kreamer	~1 October 2021	5 December 2025	~4 years, 65 days	U.S. Marine Corps
8	JoAnn Naumann	Command Sergeant Major; JoAnn Naumann	5 December 2025	Incumbent	322 days	U.S. Army

=== Chiefs of staff ===
No.	Chief of Staff		Term			Service branch
No.	Portrait	Name	Took office	Left office	Term length	Service branch
Held by the deputy commander-in-chief, June 1992 to July 1996
1	M. E. Callendar Jr.	Colonel; M. E. Callendar Jr.	July 1996	June 1998	~1 year, 335 days	U.S. Air Force
2	William M. Fraser III	Colonel; William M. Fraser III (born 1952)	June 1998	May 1999	~334 days	U.S. Air Force
3	David E. Clary	Colonel; David E. Clary	July 1999	April 2000	~275 days	U.S. Air Force
4	Jan D. Eakle	Colonel; Jan D. Eakle	April 2000	September 2000	~153 days	U.S. Air Force
5	Stephen D. Schmidt	Colonel; Stephen D. Schmidt	October 2000	July 2002	~−30 days	U.S. Air Force
6	Thomas K. Andersen	Colonel; Thomas K. Andersen	June 2002	June 2003	~1 year, 0 days	U.S. Air Force
7	Kevin T. Campbell	Major General; Kevin T. Campbell	~June 2003	~18 December 2006	~3 years, 186 days	U.S. Army
8	Howard B. Bromberg	Major General; Howard B. Bromberg	December 2006	January 2008	~1 year, 31 days	U.S. Army
9	Carroll F. Pollett	Major General; Carroll F. Pollett	~January 2008	~November 2008	~305 days	U.S. Army
10	Abraham J. Turner	Major General; Abraham J. Turner	~November 2008	May 2011	~2 years, 181 days	U.S. Army
11	William Grimsley	Major General; William Grimsley	May 2011	July 2013	~2 years, 61 days	U.S. Army
12	John Uberti	Major General; John Uberti	July 2013	July 2015	~2 years, 0 days	U.S. Army
13	Allen W. Batschelet	Major General; Allen W. Batschelet	June 2015	July 2016	~1 year, 30 days	U.S. Army
14	James H. Dickinson	Major General; James H. Dickinson (born 1962/1963)	July 2016	December 2016	~153 days	U.S. Army
15	Daniel L. Karbler	Major General; Daniel L. Karbler	December 2016	August 2019	~2 years, 243 days	U.S. Army
16	Randy S. Taylor	Major General; Randy S. Taylor	~August 2019	~31 July 2020	~351 days	U.S. Army
17	William W. Wheeler	Rear Admiral; William W. Wheeler (born 1966)	31 July 2020	~25 July 2022	~1 year, 359 days	U.S. Navy
18	Gregory J. Brady	Major General; Gregory J. Brady (born c. 1969)	~25 July 2022	September 2024	~2 years, 38 days	U.S. Army
19	Christopher L. Eubank	Major General; Christopher L. Eubank	September 2024	July 2025	~317 days	U.S. Army
20	John W. Weidner	Major General; John W. Weidner	July 2025	23 September 2026	~1 year, 70 days	U.S. Army
21	James D. Turinetti IV	Major General; James D. Turinetti IV	23 September 2026	Incumbent	30 days	U.S. Army

== See also ==
- United States Strategic Command
- Leadership of the United States Africa Command
- Leadership of the United States European Command
- Leadership of the United States Indo-Pacific Command
- Leadership of the United States Northern Command
- Leadership of the United States Space Command
- Leadership of the United States Cyber Command
- Leadership of the United States Transportation Command
