= Ferdinand Stoss =

U.S. Air Force general

Ferdinand B. Stoss III
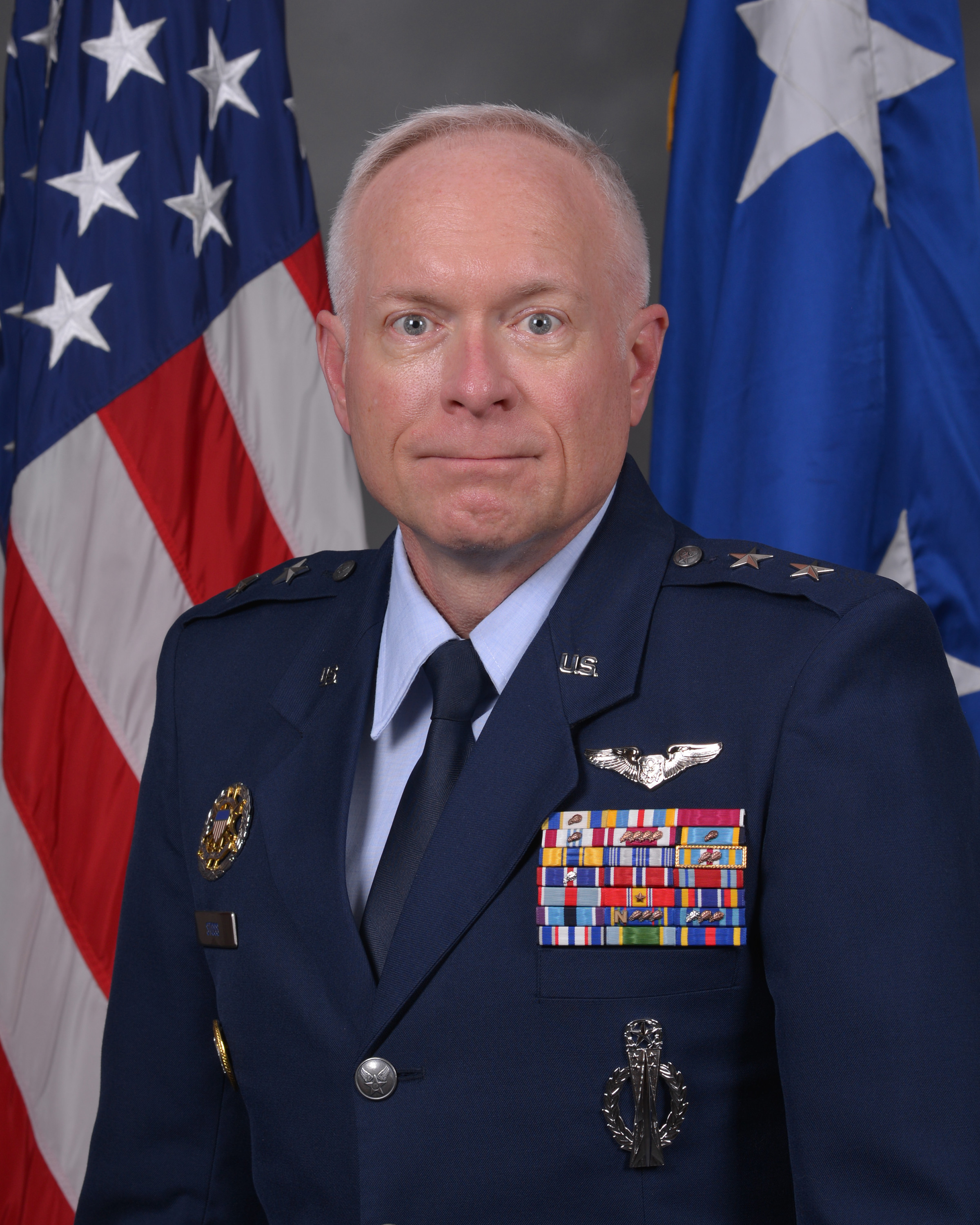
- Military career
- Allegiance: United States
- Branch: United States Air Force
- Service years: 1987–2022
- Rank: Major General
- Nickname: Fred
- Commands: Twentieth Air Force; 91st Missile Wing; 10th Missile Squadron
- Awards: Air Force Distinguished Service Medal (2); Defense Superior Service Medal; Legion of Merit

Ferdinand B. Stoss III is a United States Air Force major general who most recently served as the director of plans and policy of the United States Strategic Command. Previously, he was the Commander of the Twentieth Air Force.

Stoss retired from active duty in May 2022. He subsequently joined with the Johns Hopkins Applied Physics Laboratory, as a Senior Professional Staff Member.

== Career ==
Maj. Gen. Stoss entered active-duty service in 1988 after commissioning through the Air Force Reserve Officer Training Corps program at Kansas State University in 1987.

Maj. Gen. Stoss largely served in the nuclear enterprise. Positions held include Intercontinental Ballistic Missile Launch Officer, Command Operations Evaluator, U.S. Strategic Command War Planner, Squadron Commander, Deputy Group Commander, Vice Wing Commander, Wing Commander, Numbered Air Force Commander, and several nuclear-related staff positions. Other staff assignments include AFROTC instructor duty and Military Assistant to the U.S. Ambassador to the United Nations.

== Education ==
● 1987 Bachelor of Science, Political Science, Kansas State University, Manhattan

● 1993 Master of Science, Aerospace Operations, Embry-Riddle Aeronautical University, Ellsworth Air Force Base, S.D.

● 1993 Squadron Officer School, Maxwell AFB, Ala., by correspondence and in residence

● 2000 College of Naval Command and Staff, with highest distinction, Newport, R.I.

● 2000 Naval Operational Planner Course, Naval War College, Newport, R.I.

● 2003 Air War College, Maxwell AFB, Ala., by correspondence

● 2006 Master of Science, History, University of Nebraska at Omaha

● 2007 Senior Developmental Education Fellow, Oak Ridge National Laboratory, Oak Ridge, Tenn.

● 2009 Joint Forces Staff College, Norfolk, Va.

● 2010 Enterprise Leadership Course, Darden School of Business, University of Virginia, Charlottesville

● 2010 Senior Executives Program, John F. Kennedy School of Government, Harvard University, Cambridge, Mass.

● 2011 National Security Forum, The Maxwell School, Syracuse University, Syracuse, N.Y.

Military offices
Preceded by Christopher B. Ayres	Commander of the 91st Missile Wing; 2009–2011	Succeeded by Stephen L. Davis
Preceded by ???	Deputy Director for Nuclear Operations of the United States Strategic Command; 2012–2014	Succeeded by Paul W. Tibbets IV
Preceded by Clinton Crosier	Director of Strategic Plans, Programs, Requirements, and Assessments of the Air Force Global Strike Command; 2014–2016	Succeeded by John T. Wilcox
Preceded by Glen D. VanHerck	Director of Operations and Communications of the Air Force Global Strike Command; 2016–2018	Succeeded by Gentry W. Boswell
Preceded by Anthony J. Cotton	Commander of the Twentieth Air Force; 2018–2020	Succeeded by Michael Lutton
Preceded by Richard A. Correll	Director of Plans and Policy of the United States Strategic Command; 2020–2022	Succeeded by Anthony C. Carullo
