= John J. Allen (general) =

U.S. Air Force general

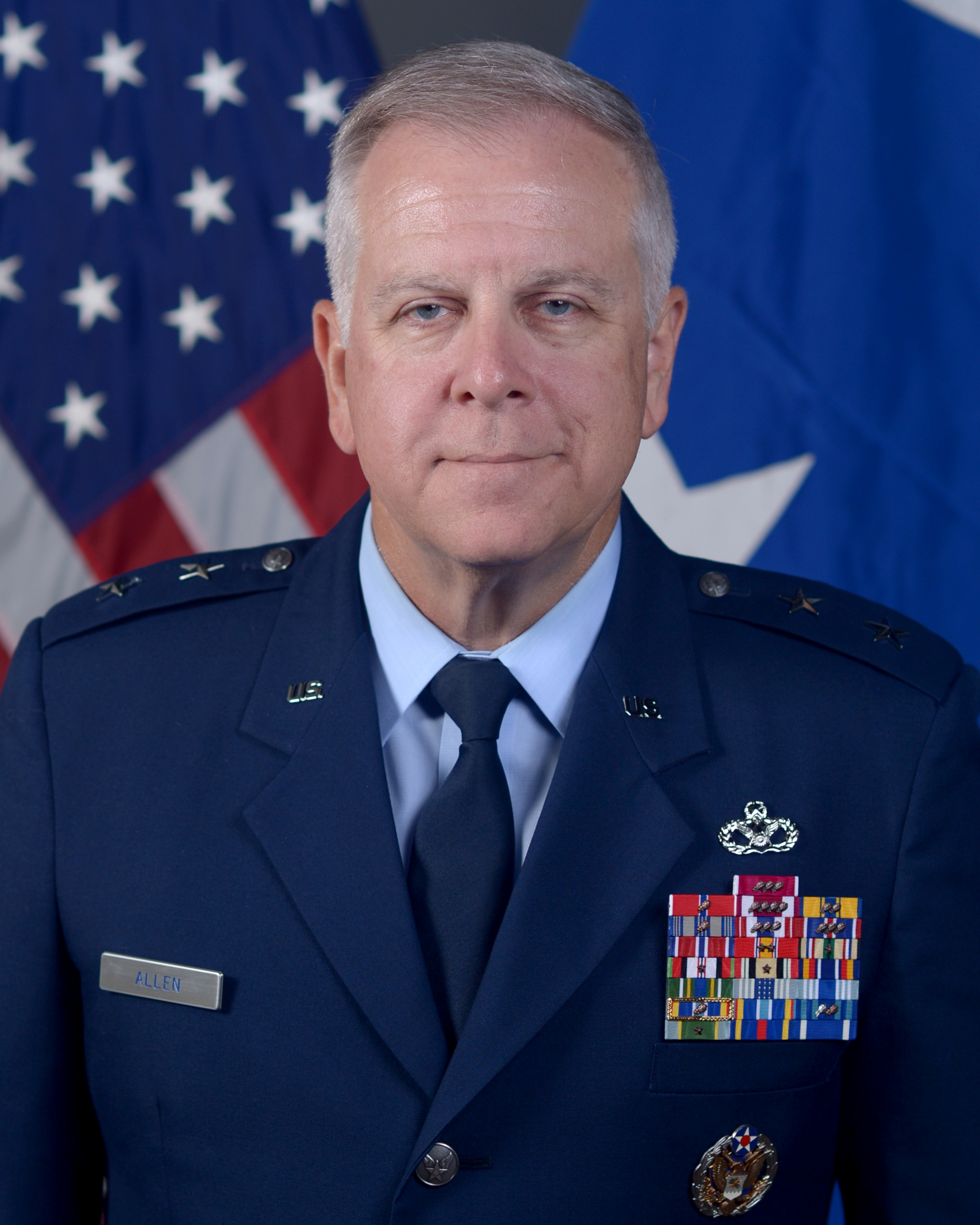
- Military career
- Allegiance: United States
- Branch: United States Air Force
- Service years: 1992–present
- Rank: Major general
- Commands: Air Force Installation and Mission Support Center; Air Force Civil Engineer Center; 633rd Air Base Wing; 1st Expeditionary Civil Engineer Group; 577th Expeditionary Prime BEEF Group; 28th Civil Engineer Squadron; 332nd Expeditionary Civil Engineer Squadron
- Awards: Legion of Merit (3)

John J. Allen Jr. is a United States Air Force major general who serves as the commander of the Air Force Installation and Mission Support Center. He previously commanded the Air Force Civil Engineer Center.

Military offices
Preceded by ???	Director of Civil Engineers of the United States Air Force; 2018–2020	Succeeded by William H. Kale
Preceded by Terry G. Edwards	Commander of the Air Force Civil Engineer Center; 2020–2022	Succeeded by William H. Kale
Preceded by John T. Wilcox	Commander of the Air Force Installation and Mission Support Center; 2022–present	Incumbent
