= Stephen L. Davis =

U.S. Air Force general

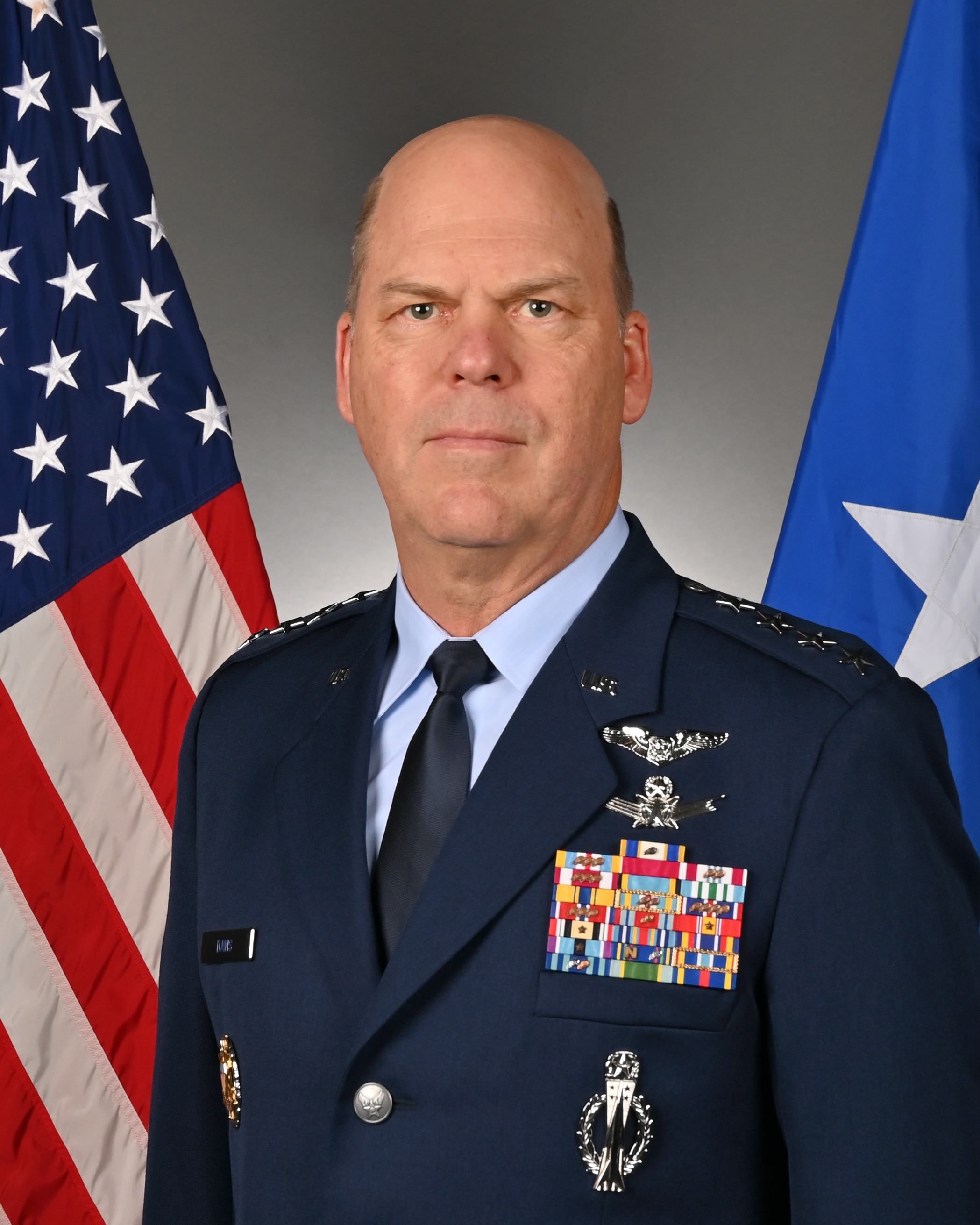
- Official portrait, 2025
- Born: Reno, Nevada, US
- Military career
- Allegiance: United States
- Branch: United States Air Force
- Service years: 1989–present
- Rank: General
- Commands: Air Force Global Strike Command; 91st Missile Wing; 576th Flight Test Squadron
- Conflicts: Iraq War
- Awards: Air Force Distinguished Service Medal; Defense Superior Service Medal (4); Legion of Merit

Stephen L. Davis is a United States Air Force general who serves as commander of the Air Force Global Strike Command since 4 November 2025. He previously served as the Inspector General of the Department of the Air Force from March 2022 to November 2025. He most recently served as the director of global power programs at the Office of the Assistant Secretary for Acquisition, Technology and Logistics. Previously, he was the director for global operations of the United States Strategic Command.

== Military career ==
Davis was born at Stead Air Force Base in Reno, Nevada, into a military family. He was commissioned an officer in the United States Air Force in 1989 after graduation from the Air Force Officer Training School. Afterwards, he underwent missile training at Vandenberg Air Force Base. Following time with the 321st Strategic Missile Wing at Grand Forks Air Force Base, Davis returned to Vandenberg in 1994, where he was assigned to 576th Flight Test Squadron.

In 1997, Davis was attached to Air Force Space Command. He would later become a flight commander of the 11th Space Warning Squadron. During the Iraq War, Davis was part of the Iraq Survey Group in 2004. Later, he served as commander of the 576th Flight Test Squadron at Vandenberg. After being assigned to United States Strategic Command from 2008 to 2010, he was named vice commander of the 341st Missile Wing at Malmstrom Air Force Base and commander of the 91st Missile Wing at Minot Air Force Base.

From 2012 to 2014, Davis was attached to the Joint Chiefs of Staff and from 2014 to 2016, the United States Department of Energy. In 2016 he was stationed at The Pentagon and served as a special assistant to the Chief of Staff of the United States Air Force for Squadron Revitalization from 2017 to 2018. He was stationed at Offutt Air Force Base, as the director of global operations, United States Strategic Command.

Awards Davis has received include the Defense Superior Service Medal with three oak leaf clusters, the Legion of Merit, the Defense Meritorious Service Medal with oak leaf cluster, the Meritorious Service Medal with three oak leaf clusters, the Joint Service Commendation Medal, the Air Force Commendation Medal, the Combat Readiness Medal with oak leaf cluster, the National Defense Service Medal with service star, the Iraq Campaign Medal with two campaign stars, the Global War on Terrorism Service Medal, the Humanitarian Service Medal with oak leaf cluster and the Nuclear Deterrence Operations Service Medal with 'N' device and three oak leaf clusters.

In July 2025, he was nominated for promotion to general.

== Education ==
- Wright State University
- Squadron Officer School
- Embry-Riddle Aeronautical University, Daytona Beach
- Marine Corps University
- Air University
- Fletcher School of Law and Diplomacy – Tufts University

== Awards and decorations ==

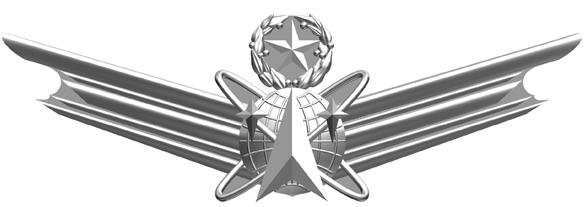

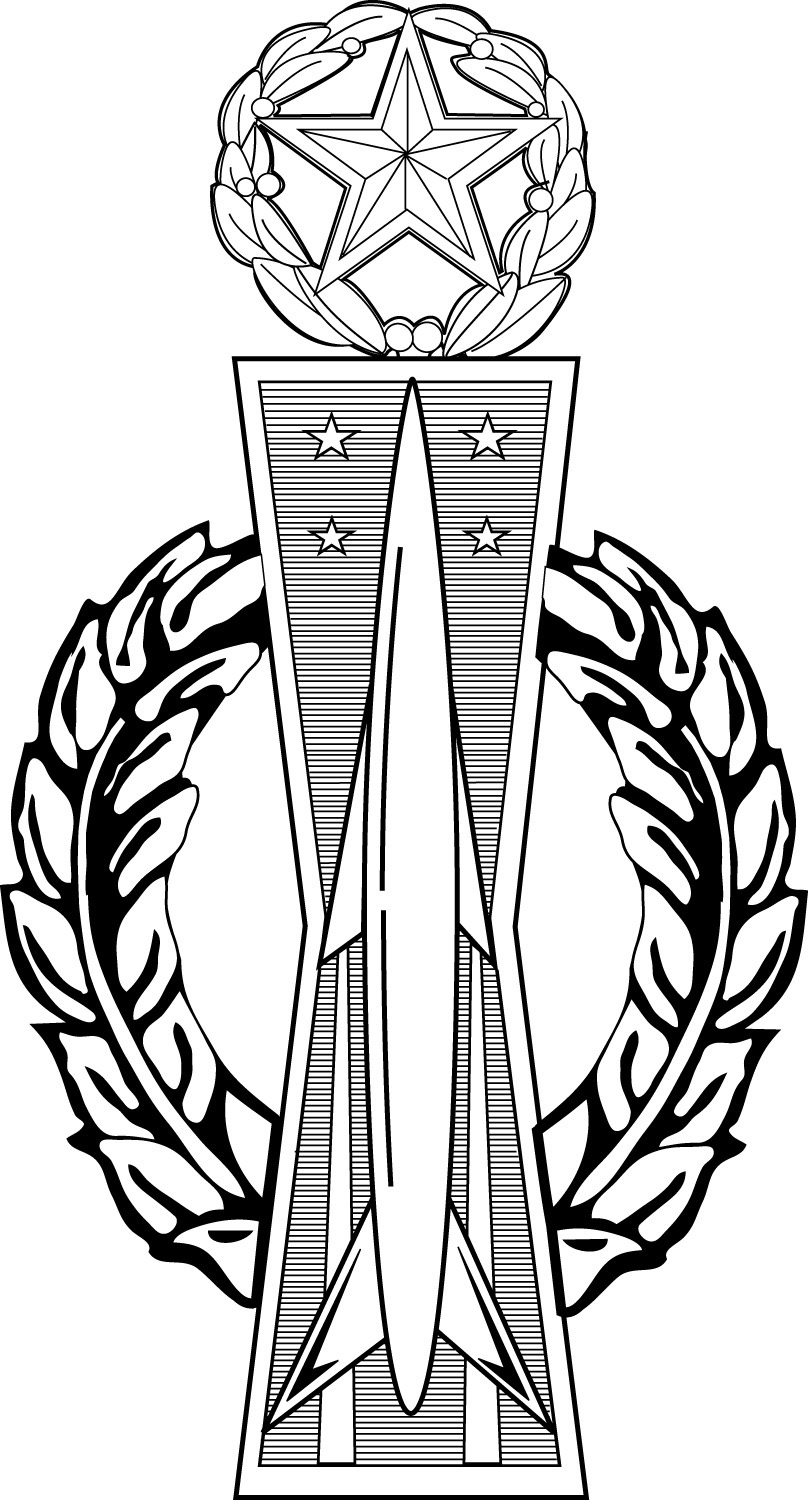

United States Air Force Officer Aircrew Badge
Master Space Operations Badge
U.S Air Force Distinguished Service Medal with bronze oak leaf cluster
Defense Superior Service Medal with two bronze oak leaf clusters	Legion of Merit	Defense Meritorious Service Medal with two bronze oak leaf clusters
Meritorious Service Medal with silver oak leaf cluster	Aerial Achievement Medal	Joint Service Commendation Medal
Air and Space Commendation Medal	Joint Meritorious Unit Award with two oak leaf clusters	Air Force Meritorious Unit with four oak leaf clusters
Air and Space Outstanding Unit Award with three oak leaf clusters	Combat Readiness Medal with bronze oak leaf cluster	National Defense Service Medal with bronze service star
Iraq Campaign Medal with bronze service star	Global War on Terrorism Expeditionary Medal	Global War on Terrorism Service Medal
Humanitarian Service Medal with bronze service star	Nuclear Deterrence Operations Service Medal with "N" device and bronze oak leaf cluster	Air Force Expeditionary Service Ribbon with oak leaf cluster and gold frame
Air and Space Longevity Service Award with silver oak leaf cluster and bronze oak leaf cluster	Small Arms Expert Marksmanship Ribbon	Air Force Training Ribbon
Command Missile Operations Badge
Office of the Secretary of Defense Identification Badge

Military offices
Preceded by Ferdinand Stoss	Commander of the 91st Missile Wing; 2011–2012	Succeeded by Robert Vercher
Preceded by James C. Dawkins	Principal Assistant Deputy Administrator for Military Applications of the National Nuclear Security Administration; 2014–2016	Succeeded by Michael Lutton
Preceded by Richard M. Murphy	Director of Manpower, Organization, and Resources of the United States Air Force; 2016–2017	Succeeded by Troy E. Dunn
Preceded by Daniel Fillion	Director of Global Operations of the United States Strategic Command; 2018–2020	Succeeded by Thomas Ishee
Preceded by James C. Dawkins	Director of Global Power Programs at the Office of the Assistant Secretary for Acquisition, Technology and Logistics; 2020–2021	Succeeded by John J. Nichols
Preceded by Sami D. Said	Inspector General of the Department of the Air Force; 2022–2025	Succeeded by David B. Lyons
Preceded by Thomas A. Bussiere	Commander of the Air Force Global Strike Command; 2025–present	Incumbent
