= Richard A. Correll =

U.S. Navy admiral

Richard Correll
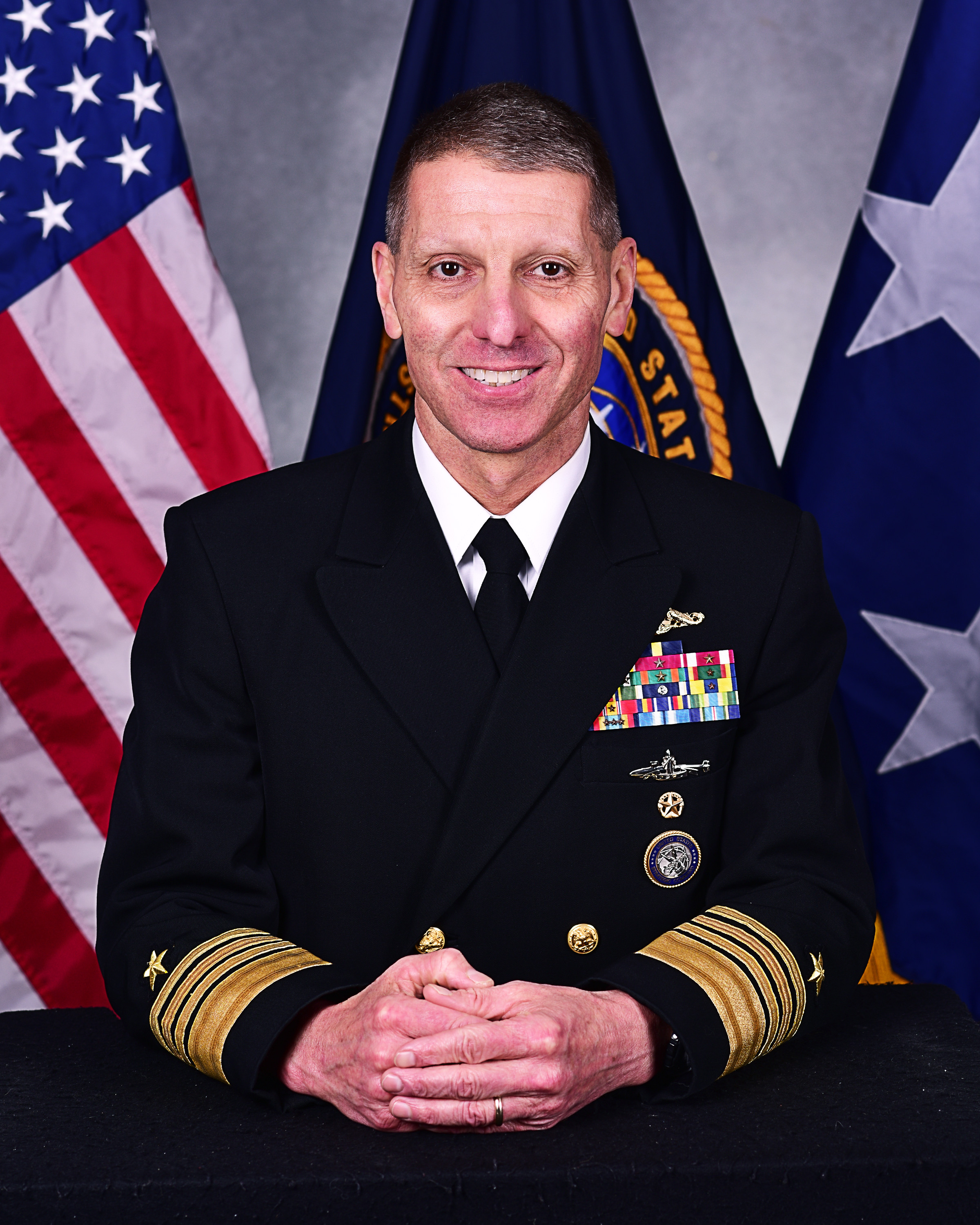
- Official portrait, 2025
- Born: Richard Allen Correll; 1964 (age 61–62)
- Allegiance: United States
- Branch: United States Navy
- Service years: 1986–present
- Rank: Admiral
- Commands: United States Strategic Command; Submarine Group 7; Submarine Squadron 11; USS Topeka (SSN 754)
- Awards: Navy Distinguished Service Medal; Defense Superior Service Medal; Legion of Merit (4); Meritorious Service Medal (2)
- Alma mater: Rose-Hulman Institute of Technology (BS); Tufts University (MA)

Richard Allen Correll (born 1964) is a United States Navy admiral who serves as the 13th commander of the United States Strategic Command since 5 December 2025. He previously served as the deputy commander of the United States Strategic Command from July 2025 to December 2025. Prior to that, he served as the director of strategic integration of the United States Navy from 17 July 2020 to 15 July 2022.

Correll graduated from the Rose–Hulman Institute of Technology in 1986 with a B.S. degree in chemical engineering and received his commission though the school's Naval Reserve Officers Training Corps program. He later earned a master's degree in international strategic studies from The Fletcher School of Law and Diplomacy at Tufts University.

In May 2022, Correll was nominated for promotion to vice admiral and assignment as the deputy commander of United States Strategic Command.

In September 2025, Correll was nominated for promotion to admiral and assignment as the commander of United States Strategic Command.

Correll married his wife, Samantha Ann Wheeler, on 19 July 1991 in Kitsap County, Washington.

== Awards and decorations ==

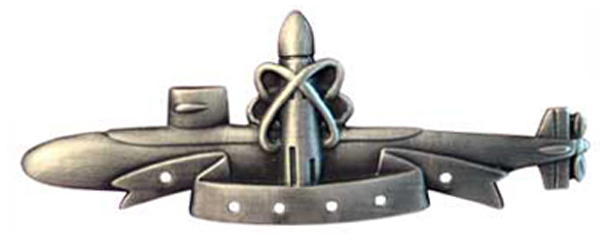

Officer Submarine Warfare insignia
Navy Distinguished Service Medal
Defense Superior Service Medal	Legion of Merit with 1 silver award star	Meritorious Service Medal with gold award star
Navy and Marine Corps Commendation Medal with 4 gold award stars	Navy and Marine Corps Achievement Medal with 1 gold award star	Navy Unit Commendation with 1 service star
Navy Meritorious Unit Commendation with 1 bronze service star	Navy "E" Ribbon with four Battle E awards	Navy Expeditionary Medal with 1 bronze service star
National Defense Service Medal with 1 bronze service star	Global War on Terrorism Service Medal	Armed Forces Service Medal
Navy and Marine Corps Sea Service Deployment Ribbon with 3 bronze service stars	Navy Arctic Service Ribbon	Coast Guard Special Operations Service Ribbon
Silver SSBN Deterrent Patrol insignia (5 awards)
Command at Sea insignia

Military offices
Preceded by ???	Commander of Submarine Squadron 11; 2010–2012	Succeeded by Thomas Ishee
Preceded by ???	Director of Joint Fleet Operations of the Fleet Forces Command; 2014–2016	Succeeded by Blake Converse
Preceded by William R. Merz	Commander of Submarine Group 7; 2016–2018	Succeeded by James E. Pitts
Preceded by Nina Armagno	Director of Plans and Policy of the United States Strategic Command; 2018–2020	Succeeded by Ferdinand Stoss
Preceded by ???	Director of Strategic Integration of the United States Navy; 2020–2022	Succeeded by Robert Gaucher
Preceded by Thomas A. Bussiere	Deputy Commander of the United States Strategic Command; 2022–2025	Succeeded by Michael Lutton
Preceded by Anthony J. Cotton	Commander of the United States Strategic Command; 2025–present	Incumbent
