= Jason Armagost =

U.S. Air Force general

Jason R. Armagost
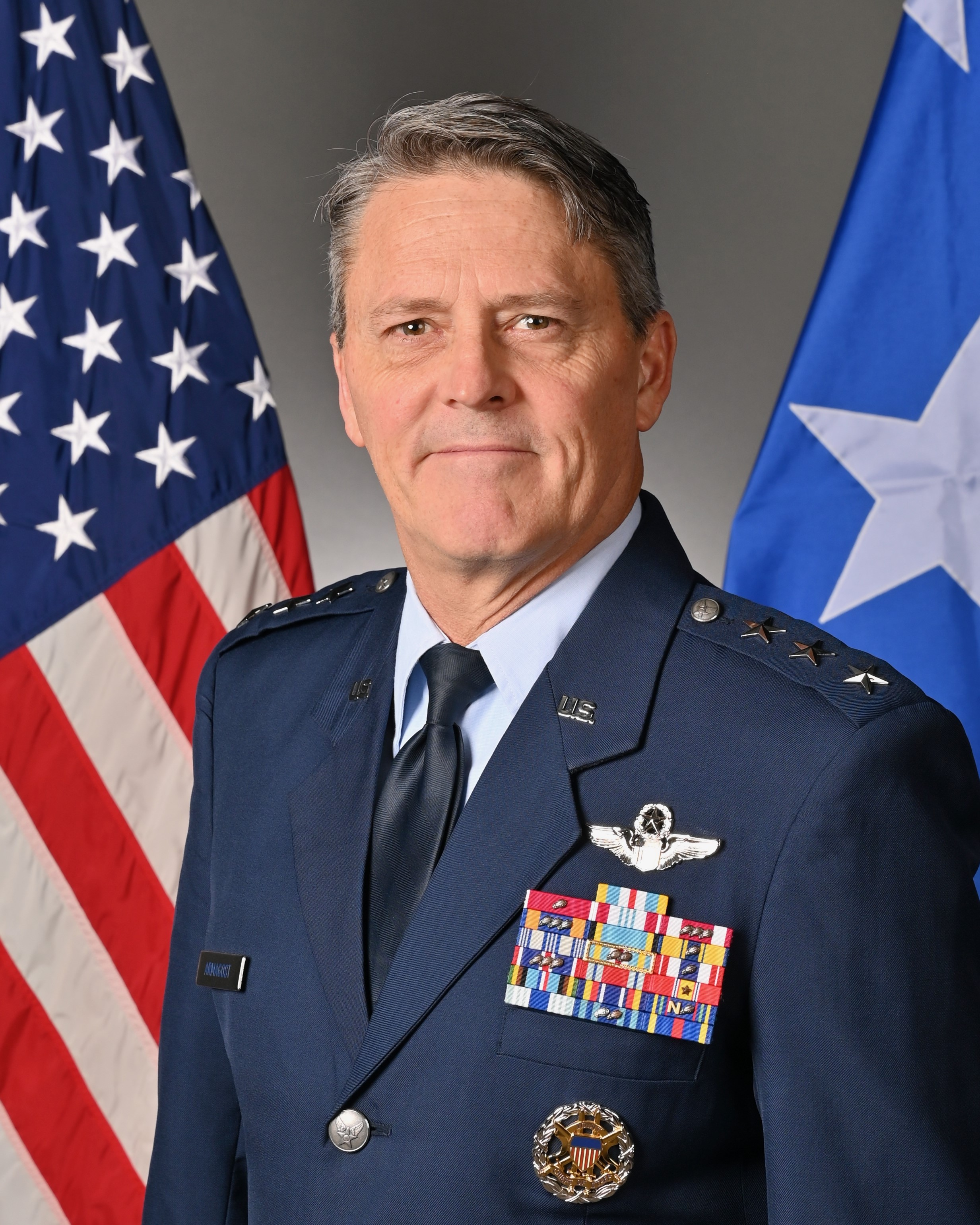
- Born: Alaska, U.S.
- Military career
- Allegiance: United States
- Branch: United States Air Force
- Service years: 1992-present
- Rank: Lieutenant general
- Commands: Eighth Air Force; 379th Air Expeditionary Wing; 5th Bomb Wing; 13th Bomb Squadron
- Awards: Defense Superior Service Medal; Legion of Merit (2)

Jason R. Armagost is a United States Air Force lieutenant general who serves as Deputy Commander of the Air Force Global Strike Command. He previously served as the commander of the Eighth Air Force, and as the director of strategic plans, programs and requirements of Air Force Global Strike Command from 2021 to 2023, during which he concurrently served as the deputy commander of Security Assistance Group - Ukraine from October 2022 to March 2023. He has also commanded the 379th Air Expeditionary Wing.

He is the Director of Strategic Plans, Programs, and Requirements at Barksdale Air Force Base in Louisiana. For the nation's Minuteman III intercontinental ballistic missile force, B-1, B-2, and B-52 bombers, MH-139 and UH-1N helicopters, the E-4B National Airborne Operations Center Aircraft, and Nuclear Command, Control, and Communications systems, he is responsible for strategic planning, establishing requirements, and programming advocacy. With a total budget of more than $13.5 billion, he is also in charge of funding and requirements for the modernization and recapitalization of strategic nuclear assets, including the Ground Based Strategic Deterrent and the B-21 Raider. AFGSC equips combatant commanders with combat-ready forces to undertake strategic nuclear and global strike operations, with about 33,700 personnel.

In 1992, He received his commission from the United States Air Force Academy. He has more than 2,900 hours in the B-2A, F-16CJ, F-16CG, B-1B, B-52H, and T-38A, and has served in several operational and training deployments. A fellowship at Stanford University's Center for International Security and Cooperation and duties as Chief of Nuclear Operations on the Joint Staff at the Pentagon are among his significant educational and staff assignments.

He was in charge of the 13th Bomb Squadron at Whiteman Air Force Base in Missouri, the 5th Bomb Wing at Minot Air Force Base in North Dakota, and the 379th Air Expeditionary Wing at Al Udeid Air Base in Qatar. During operations Desert Strike, Southern Watch, Iraqi Freedom, Enduring Freedom, Inherent Resolve, Freedom's Sentinel, and Deliberate Resolve, his operational duties supported contingency operations. He's also flown the F-16CJ, B-2A, B-1B, and B-52H on several combat missions.

Military offices
Preceded by Alex Mezynski	Commander of the 5th Bomb Wing; 2014–2016	Succeeded by Matthew Brooks
Preceded by Darren V. James	Commander of the 379th Air Expeditionary Wing; 2017–2019	Succeeded by Daniel Tulley
Preceded by John T. Wilcox	Director of Operations and Communications of the Air Force Global Strike Command; 2019–2021	Succeeded by Michael A. Miller
New command	Deputy Commander of Security Assistance Group–Ukraine; 2022–2023	Vacant
Preceded by Andrew Gebara	Director of Strategic Plans, Programs, and Requirements of the Air Force Global Strike Command; 2021–2023	Succeeded by Ty W. Neuman
Preceded by Andrew Gebara	Commander of the Eighth Air Force; 2023–2025	Succeeded by Ty W. Neuman
