= Anthony J. Cotton =

U.S. Air Force general

Anthony Cotton
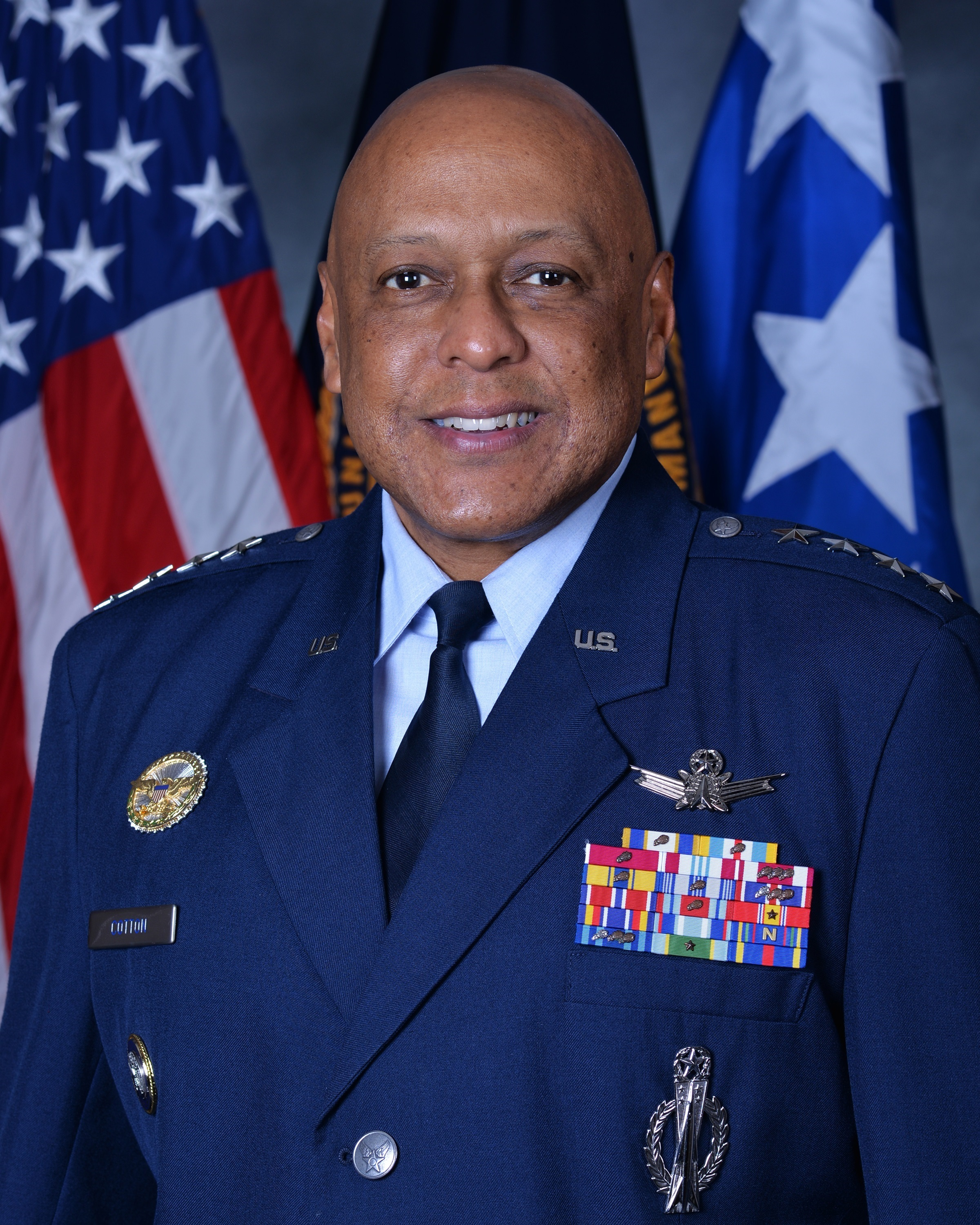
- Education: North Carolina State University (BA); Central Michigan University (MS)
- Military career
- Allegiance: United States
- Branch: United States Air Force
- Service years: 1986–2025
- Rank: General
- Commands: United States Strategic Command; Air Force Global Strike Command; Air Forces Strategic - Air, U.S. Strategic Command; Air University; Twentieth Air Force; 45th Space Wing; 341st Missile Wing; 45th Operations Group
- Conflicts: Twelve-Day War
- Awards: Air Force Distinguished Service Medal (2); Defense Superior Service Medal (2); Legion of Merit (2)
- Anthony J. Cotton's voice Cotton's opening statement at a Senate Armed Services Committee hearing on the Future Years Defense Program; Recorded 9 March 2023

Anthony James Cotton is a retired United States Air Force four-star general who last served as the 12th commander of the United States Strategic Command from 9 December 2022 to 5 December 2025. He previously served as the commander of the Air Force Global Strike Command from 27 August 2021 to 7 December 2022, having served as the deputy commander from 2019 to 2021. Prior to that, he was the president of the Air University.

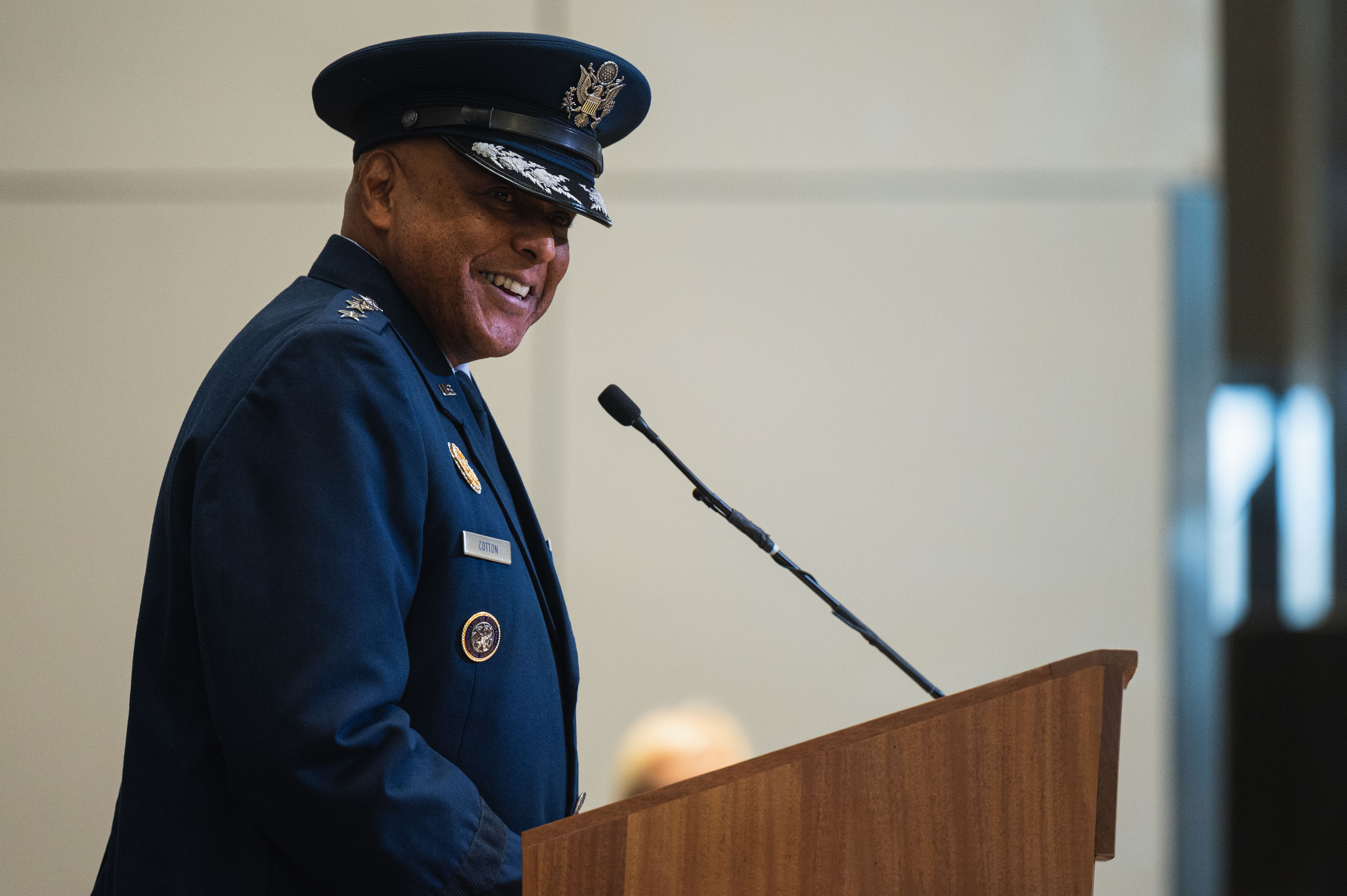
Cotton speaks during the USSTRATCOM change of command ceremony, Omaha, Neb., Dec. 9, 2022.

Cotton is from Dudley, North Carolina, where he graduated from Southern Wayne High School in 1981. He is the son of James H. and Amy K. Cotton; his father was a chief master sergeant in the Air Force. Anthony Cotton was commissioned through ROTC at North Carolina State University in 1986, where he also earned a bachelor's degree in political science. Prior to his AFGSC service, Cotton commanded the 20th Air Force, served as deputy director of the National Reconnaissance Office, and was senior military assistant to the under secretary of defense for intelligence.

In June 2022, Cotton was nominated for reappointment as general and assignment as commander of the United States Strategic Command. He appeared for a hearing before the Senate Committee on Armed Services on 15 September 2022 and was confirmed by voice vote of the full Senate on 29 September 2022. He assumed command on 9 December 2022.

== Awards and decorations ==
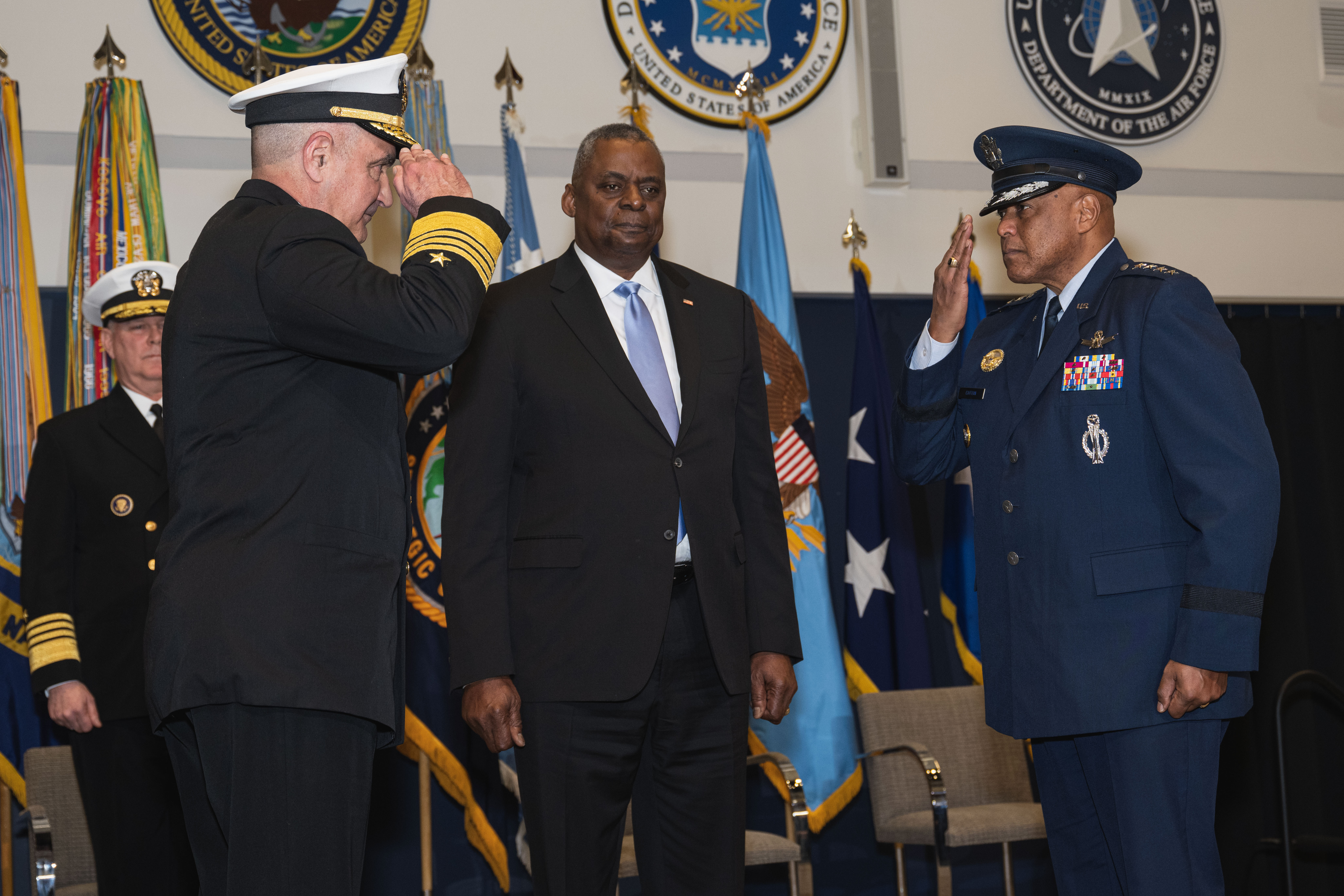
Gen Cotton (right) relieves ADM Charles A. Richard (second from left) as the commander of United States Strategic Command on 9 December 2022.

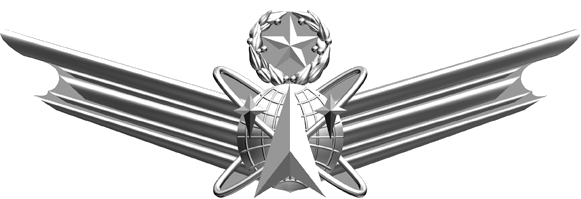
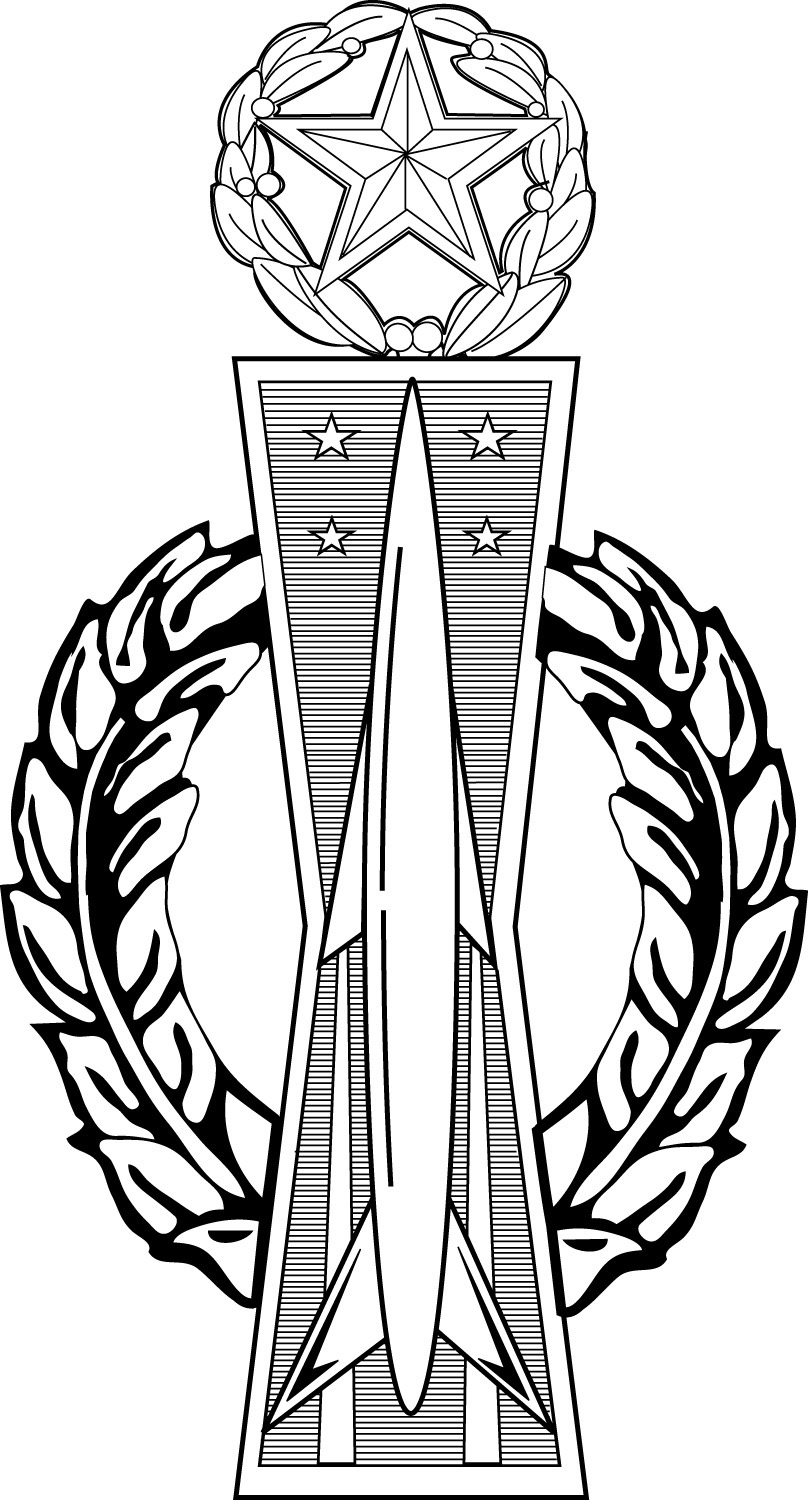
Command Space Operations Badge
Command Missile Operations Badge
Office of the Secretary of Defense Identification Badge
Headquarters Air Force Badge

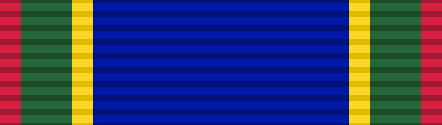
Air Force Distinguished Service Medal with one bronze oak leaf cluster
Defense Superior Service Medal with one bronze oak leaf cluster
Legion of Merit with oak leaf cluster
Defense Meritorious Service Medal
Meritorious Service Medal with three oak leaf clusters
Air Force Commendation Medal with oak leaf cluster
Air Force Achievement Medal with oak leaf cluster
Air Force Outstanding Unit Award with one silver and two bronze oak leaf clusters
Air Force Organizational Excellence Award
National Reconnaissance Office Distinguished Service Medal (gold medal)
Combat Readiness Medal with oak leaf cluster
National Defense Service Medal with one bronze service star
Global War on Terrorism Service Medal
Air and Space Campaign Medal
Nuclear Deterrence Operations Service Medal with "N" device
Air Force Longevity Service Award with one silver and three bronze oak leaf clusters
Small Arms Expert Marksmanship Ribbon with service star
Air Force Training Ribbon
Grand Cordon of the Order of the Rising Sun

== Effective dates of promotions ==
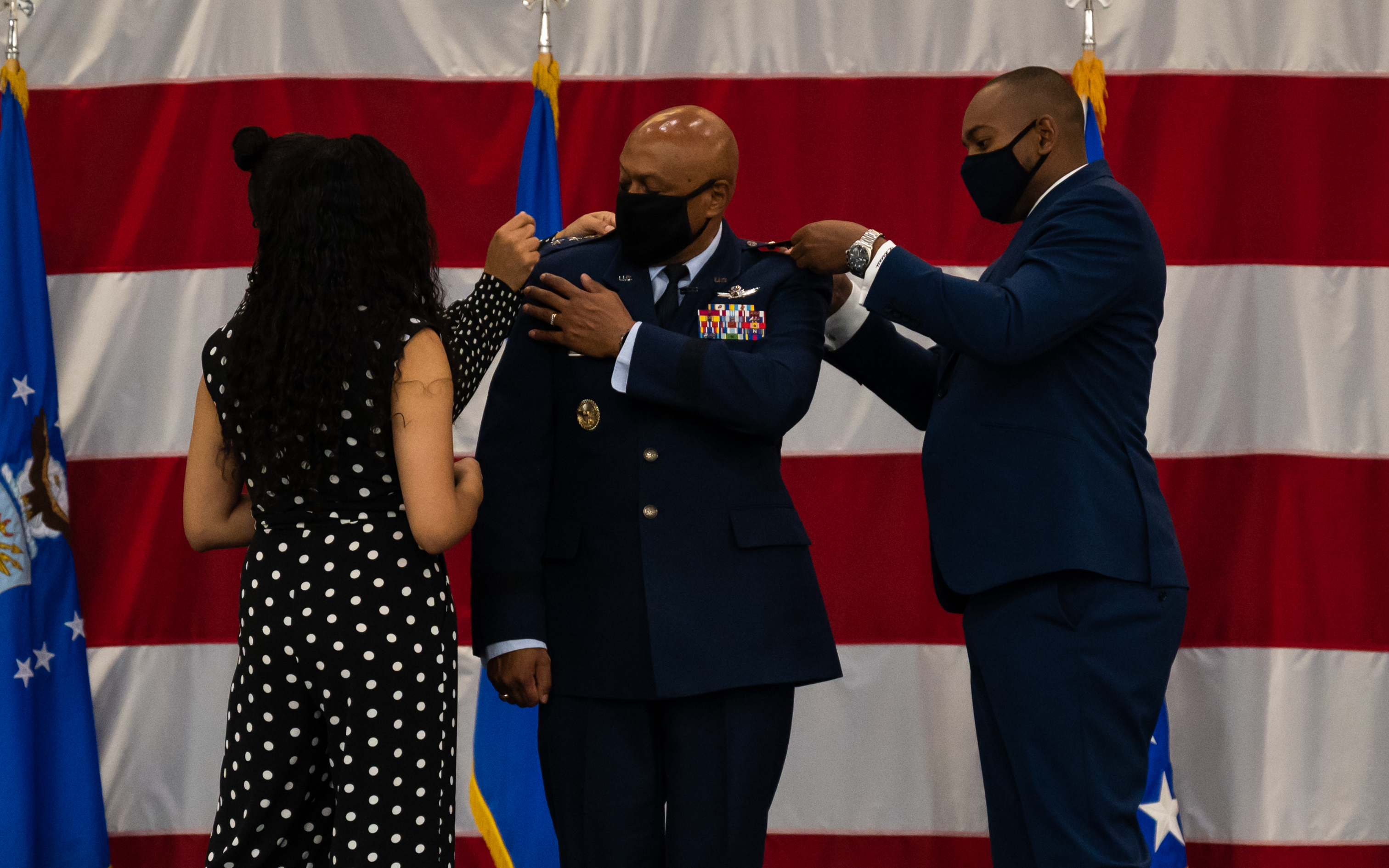
Cotton is pinned with his four-star rank insignia by his family at his promotion ceremony, August 27, 2021.

Rank	Date
Second lieutenant	7 June 1986
First lieutenant	7 June 1988
Captain	7 June 1990
Major	1 March 1998
Lieutenant colonel	1 March 2002
Colonel	1 December 2006
Brigadier general	10 November 2011
Major general	6 July 2015
Lieutenant general	15 February 2018
General	27 August 2021

Military offices
Preceded by Michael E. Fortney	Commander of the 341st Missile Wing; 2010–2011	Succeeded by Heraldo Brual
Preceded by B. Edwin Wilson	Commander of the 45th Space Wing; 2011–2013	Succeeded by Nina Armagno
Preceded by Jack Weinstein	Commander of the Twentieth Air Force; 2015–2018	Succeeded by Ferdinand Stoss
Preceded by Michael Rothstein; Acting	Commander and President of the Air University; 2018–2019	Succeeded by Brad M. Sullivan; Acting
Preceded by Timothy Ray	Commander of the Air Force Global Strike Command; 2021–2022	Succeeded by Thomas A. Bussiere
Preceded by Charles A. Richard	Commander of the United States Strategic Command; 2022–2025	Succeeded by Richard A. Correll
U.S. order of precedence (ceremonial)
Preceded by Bryan P. Fenton as Commander of U.S. Special Operations Command	Order of precedence of the United States as Commander of U.S. Strategic Command	Succeeded by Stephen N. Whiting as Commander of U.S. Space Command
