= Joint Base San Antonio =

US military joint service installation near San Antonio, Texas, United States

- San Antonio, Texas in the United States of America
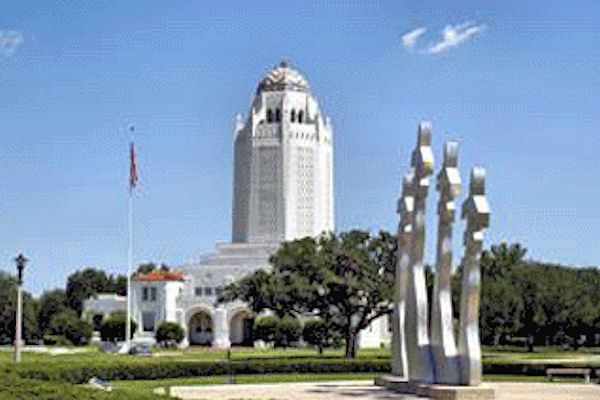
- The Administration Building at Joint Base San Antonio–Randolph, with the Missing Man Monument in the foreground.

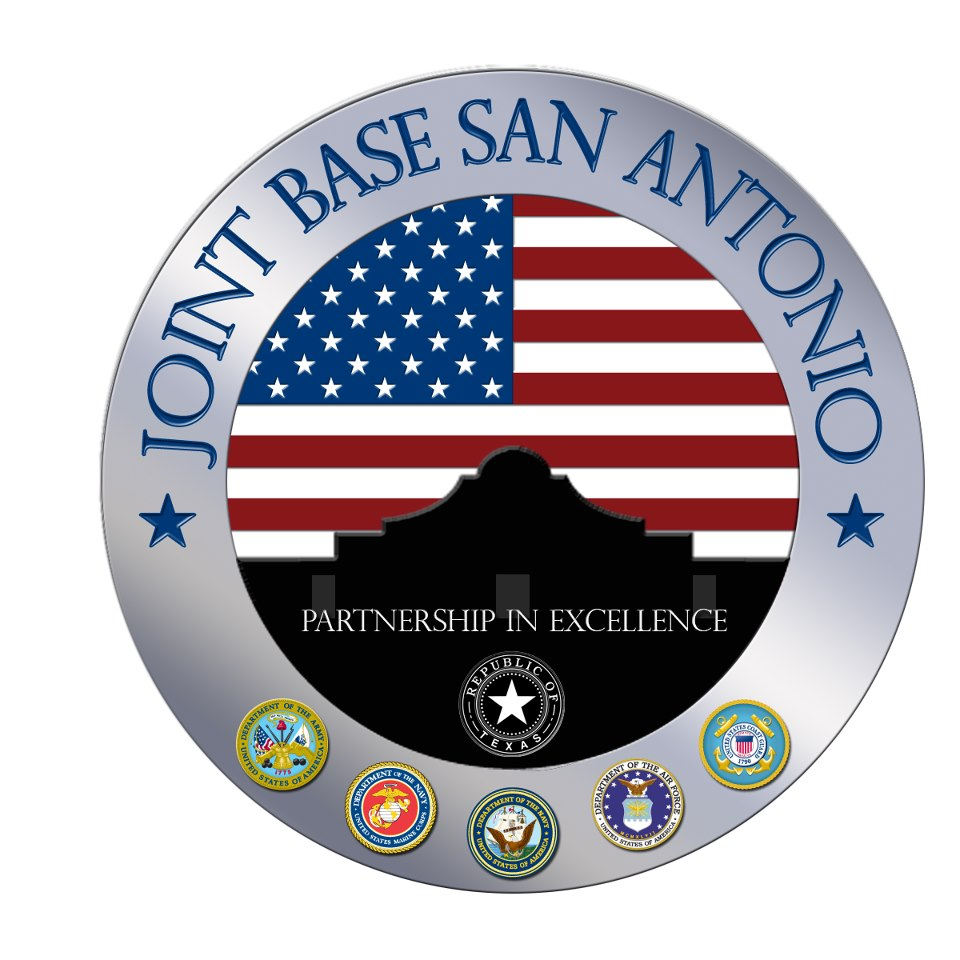

Site information
- Type: US military Joint Base
- Owner: Department of Defense
- Operator: United States Air Force
- Controlled by: Air Education and Training Command (AETC)
- Condition: Operational
- Website: www.jbsa.mil

Location
- Location in the United States
- Coordinates: 29°26′56″N 098°26′56″W

Site history
- Built: 1876 (Fort Sam Houston); 1917 (South San Antonio Aviation Camp); 1927 (Aviation Field, San Antonio); 1941 (San Antonio Aviation Cadet Center)
- In use: 2010 – present (as Joint Base)

Garrison information
- Current commander: Brigadier General Russel D. Driggers (USAF)
- Garrison: 502nd Air Base Wing (Host)

Airfield information
- JBSA Airfields: See each base's respective page for airfield data: JBSA-Lackland; JBSA-Randolph; Kelly Field Annex

Joint Base San Antonio (JBSA) is a United States military facility located in San Antonio, Texas, US. The facility is under the jurisdiction of the United States Air Force 502d Air Base Wing, Air Education and Training Command (AETC). The wing's three Mission Support Groups perform the installation support mission at the three bases that form JBSA.

The facility is a joint base of the United States Army Fort Sam Houston, the United States Air Force Randolph Air Force Base and Lackland Air Force Base, which were merged on 1 October 2010.

== Overview ==
JBSA was established in accordance with congressional legislation implementing the recommendations of the 2005 Base Realignment and Closure Commission. The legislation ordered the consolidation of the three facilities which were nearby, but separate military installations, into a single joint base, one of 12 formed in the United States as a result of the law.

Joint Base San Antonio supports a population of 80,000 and supports students at three installations annually of up to 138,000. Upon becoming the largest single DoD installation/enterprise, it has a total Plant Replacement Value of about $10.3 billion, lead a work force of over 8,000 personnel, manages an annual budget of $800 million, interface with 1,000 civic leaders of San Antonio, 20 smaller communities, four counties and four Congressional Districts, support more than 266 mission partners, supported and supporting units, and finally, support more than 250,000 other personnel including 425 retired general officers (2nd largest concentration in U.S.).

== Tenant Bases ==
- Fort Sam Houston (US Army)
- Randolph Air Force Base (US Air Force)
- Lackland Air Force Base (including Kelly Field and Chapman Training Annex) (US Air Force)
- Camp Bullis (US Army)
- Seguin Auxiliary Air Field (US Air Force)

Related Military Reservations

- Camp Stanley (US Army)

== Fort Sam Houston ==
The primary mission at Fort Sam Houston is as a medical training and support post. The post is the home of Army North, Army South, Army 5th Recruiting Brigade, Brooke Army Medical Center, the Institute of Surgical Research, US Army Medical Center of Excellence, the Army Medical Command and the 502d Air Base Wing.

Fort Sam Houston provides facilities to and support for the activities of garrison units and other tenant organizations. The post also supports the thousands of Army Reserve and National Guard soldiers who train there year-round. Soldiers from Fort Sam Houston have participated in every American War since 1845 and have deployed worldwide in support of post-Cold War contingency operations.

Together with Camp Stanley (Camp Stanley is not part of JBSA), Camp Bullis is part of the Leon Springs Military Reservation. Camp Bullis has provided firing ranges, training areas and logistics support to Fort Sam Houston and other active and reserve component units in South Texas for nearly 100 years. Its most frequent users are the Army Medical Center of Excellence, Defense Medical Readiness Training Institute, Air Force Ground Combat Skills School and Army units stationed at Fort Sam Houston. There are currently 130 military personnel stationed at Bullis.

== Lackland Air Force Base ==
Lackland Air Force Base is home to more than 120 Department of Defense and associate organizations, including the 37th Training Wing, the largest training wing in the U.S. Air Force. Lackland is the Air Force's only site for enlisted basic military training, and also offers professional and technical skills, and English language training for members of the U.S. Air Force, other military services, government agencies, and allies. Its four primary training functions graduate more than 86,000 students annually.

Other major tenants include Air Reserve Command's 433d Airlift Wing, the Texas Air National Guard 149th Fighter Wing, the 59th Medical Wing, the Sixteenth Air Force, and the 67th Cyberspace Wing.

== Randolph Air Force Base ==
Randolph is named after Captain William Millican Randolph, a native of Austin, who was on the base naming committee at the time of his death in a crash. It serves as headquarters of the Air Education and Training Command (AETC) as well as the Air Force Personnel Center (AFPC) and is known as "the Showplace of the Air Force" because of the Spanish Colonial Revival Style architecture in which all structures including hangars were constructed. The symbol of the base is a large water tower atop Building 100, housing the headquarters for Randolph's major flying unit, the 12th Flying Training Wing (12 FTW). With its distinctive architecture, the wing's headquarters has come to be known throughout the Air Force as "the Taj Mahal", or simply "The Taj".

Randolph Air Force Base is home to more than 30 Department of Defense units including Headquarters Air Education and Training Command, Air Force Personnel Center, Air Force Recruiting Service, and the 12th Flying Training Wing.

== Based units ==
Flying and notable non-flying units based at JBSA.

Units marked GSU are Geographically Separate Units, which although based at JBSA, are subordinate to a parent unit based at another location. Some units may be entirely garrisoned at JBSA, but be spread out across different sites.

=== United States Air Force ===
Air Education and Training Command (AETC)

- Headquarters Air Education and Training Command (JBSA-Randolph)
  - 502nd Air Base Wing (All Locations of JBSA)
    - Headquarters 502nd Air Base Wing
      - 502nd Contracting Squadron
      - 502nd Comptroller Squadron
      - US Air Force Band of the West
      - 502nd Force Support Group
        - 502nd Force Support Squadron
        - 802nd Force Support Squadron
      - 502nd Installation Support Group
        - 502nd Civil Engineer Squadron
        - 502nd Communications Squadron
        - 502nd Operations Support Squadron
      - 502nd Security Forces and Logistics Support Group
        - 502nd Security Forces Squadron
        - 802nd Security Forces Squadron
        - 902nd Security Forces Squadron
        - 502nd Logistics Readiness Squadron
        - 502nd Trainer Development Squadron
  - 59th Medical Wing
    - Headquarters 59th Medical Wing (JBSA-Lackland)
      - 59th Medical Operations Group (JBSA-Lackland)
        - 59th Medical Operations Squadron
        - 59th Surgical Operations Squadron
        - 59th Mental Health Squadron
        - 59th Radiology Squadron
        - 59th Surgical Specialty Squadron
        - 59th Diagnosis and Therapeutics Squadron
        - 59th Laboratory Squadron
        - 59th Pharmacy Squadron
      - 59th Medical Support Group (JBSA-Lackland)
        - 59th Medical Support Squadron
        - 59th Medical Logistics and Readiness Squadron
      - 59th Dental Group (JBSA-Lackland)
        - 59th Dental Squadron
        - 59th Dental Support Squadron
        - 59th Dental Training Squadron
      - 559th Medical Group (JBSA-Lackland)
        - 559th Aerospace Medicine Squadron
        - 559th Medical Operations Squadron
      - 359th Medical Group (JBSA-Randolph)
        - 359th Dental Squadron
        - 359th Medical Operations Squadron
        - 359th Aerospace Medicine Squadron
        - 359th Medical Operations Squadron
        - 359th Medical Support Squadron
      - 959th Medical Group (JBSA-Fort Sam Houston)
        - 959th Medical Operations Squadron
        - 959th Inpatient Operations Squadron
        - 959th Clinical Support Squadron
      - 59th Training Group (JBSA-Fort Sam Houston)
        - 381st Training Squadron
        - 382nd Training Squadron
        - 383rd Training Squadron
        - 59th Training Support Squadron
  - Second Air Force
    - 37th Training Wing (JBSA-Lackland)
      - 37th Training Wing Staff Agencies
      - 37th Training Group
        - 37th Training Support Squadron
        - 341st Training Squadron
        - 343d Training Squadron
        - 344th Training Squadron
        - 345th Training Squadron
      - 737th Training Group
        - 319th Training Squadron
        - 320th Training Squadron
        - 321st Training Squadron
        - 322d Training Squadron
        - 323d Training Squadron
        - 324th Training Squadron
        - 326th Training Squadron
        - 331st Training Squadron
        - 737th Training Support Squadron
      - Defense Language Institute English Language Center
        - 332d Training Squadron
        - 637th International Support Squadron
        - 637th Training Support Squadron
      - Inter-American Air Forces Academy
        - 318th Training Squadron
        - 837th Training Squadron
    - Special Warfare Training Wing (JBSA-Lackland)
  - Nineteenth Air Force
    - Headquarters Nineteenth Air Force (JBSA-Lackland)
    - 12th Flying Training Wing (JBSA-Randolph)
      - 12th Operations Group
        - 12th Operations Support Squadron
        - 12th Training Squadron
        - 99th Flying Training Squadron – Raytheon T-1A Jayhawk
        - 435th Fighter Training Squadron – Northrop T-38C Talon
        - 558th Flying Training Squadron – Remotely Piloted Aircraft Fundamentals
        - 559th Flying Training Squadron – Beechcraft T-6A Texan II
        - 560th Flying Training Squadron – Northrop T-38C Talon
      - 12th Maintenance Group
  - Air Force Recruiting Service
    - Headquarters Air Force Recruiting Service (JBSA-Randolph)
      - 369th Recruiting Group (JBSA-Lackland)

Air Combat Command (ACC)

- Sixteenth Air Force
  - Headquarters Sixteenth Air Force (JBSA-Lackland)
  - 616th Operations Center (JBSA-Lackland)
    - 616th Air Communications Squadron
  - 67th Cyberspace Wing (JBSA-Lackland)
    - Headquarters 67th Cyberspace Wing
    - 67th Operations Support Squadron
    - 67th Cyberspace Operations Group
      - 91st Cyberspace Operations Squadron
      - 375th Cyberspace Operations Squadron
      - 390th Cyberspace Operations Squadron
    - 318th Cyberspace Operations Group
      - 318th Range Squadron
      - 346th Test Squadron
    - 567th Cyberspace Operations Group
      - 92nd Cyberspace Operations Squadron
      - 834th Cyberspace Operations Squadron
    - 867th Cyberspace Operations Group
      - 833rd Cyberspace Operations Squadron
      - 836th Cyberspace Operations Squadron
  - 688th Cyberspace Wing
    - Headquarters 688th Cyberspace Wing (JBSA-Lackland)
    - 688th Operations Support Squadron
    - 26th Cyberspace Operations Group
      - 33rd Network Warfare Squadron
      - 68th Network Warfare Squadron
    - 690th Cyberspace Operations Group
      - 690th Intelligence Support Squadron
      - 690th Network Support Squadron
- United States Air Force Warfare Center
  - 350th Spectrum Warfare Wing
    - 850th Spectrum Warfare Group
      - 563d Electronic Warfare Squadron (GSU) (JBSA-Lackland)
      - 453rd Electronic Warfare Squadron (GSU) (JBSA-Lackland)

Air Force Materiel Command (AFMC)

- Air Force Installation and Mission Support Center (JBSA-Lackland)
  - Expeditionary Support and Innovation Directorate
    - Strategy and Innovation Division
    - Expeditionary Support Division
  - Installation Support Directorate
    - Installation Engineering Division
    - Protection Services Division
    - Cyber Support Division
    - Chaplain Corps Division
    - Installation Deployment Division
    - Airman & Family Services Division
    - Mission Activity Integration Division
  - Resources Directorate
    - Resource Management Analysis Division
    - Cost & Comparative Analysis Division
    - Financial Operations Division
    - Integration Division
    - Planning and Programming Division
  - Air Force Civil Engineer Center
  - Air Force Security Forces Center
  - Air Force Services Center
  - AFIMSC Detachment 7 (JBSA-Randolph)
- Air Force Life Cycle Management Center
  - Command, Control Communications, Intelligence & Networks Directorate
    - Cryptologic and Cyber Systems Division (GSU) (JBSA-Lackland)

Air Force Office of Special Investigations (AFOSI)

- Headquarters Air Force Office of Special Investigations
  - Operating Location Whiskey (JBSA-Lackland)
  - 4th Field Investigation Region
    - 4th Field Investigation Region Headquarters (JBSA-Randolph)
    - 11th Field Investigation Squadron (All JBSA Locations)

Air Force Field Operating Agencies

- Air Force Personnel Center (JBSA-Randolph)
- Air Force Manpower Analysis Agency (JBSA-Randolph)
- Air Force Public Affairs Agency (JBSA-Randolph)

Air Force Reserve Command (AFRC)

- Twenty-Second Air Force
  - 413th Flight Test Group
    - 415th Flight Test Flight (GSU) (JBSA-Randolph)
  - 340th Flying Training Group (JBSA-Randolph)
    - 39th Flying Training Squadron – Northrop T-38C Talon, Raytheon T-1A Jayhawk, & Beechcraft T-6A Texan II
    - 433rd Training Squadron (JBSA-Lackland)
- Tenth Air Force
  - 960th Cyberspace Wing (JBSA-Lackland)
    - Headquarters 960th Cyberspace Wing
    - 960th Cyberspace Operations Group
      - 426th Network Warfare Squadron
      - 50th Network Warfare Squadron
      - 854th Combat Operations Squadron
      - 960th Operations Support Flight
  - 655th Intelligence, Surveillance and Reconnaissance Wing
    - 655th Intelligence, Surveillance and Reconnaissance Group
      - 23d Intelligence Squadron (GSU) (JBSA-Lackland)
- Fourth Air Force
  - 433d Airlift Wing (JBSA-Lackland)
    - Headquarters 433d Airlift Wing
    - 433d Operations Group
      - 68th Airlift Squadron – Lockheed C-5M Galaxy
      - 356th Airlift Squadron – Lockheed C-5M Galaxy
      - 433d Aeromedical Evacuation Squadron
      - 733d Training Squadron
      - 433d Contingency Response Flight
      - 433d Operations Support Squadron
    - 433d Maintenance Group
      - 433d Maintenance Squadron
      - 433d Aircraft Maintenance Squadron
    - 433d Mission Support Group
      - 26th Aerial Port Squadron
      - 74th Aerial Port Squadron
      - 433rd Force Support Squadron
      - 433rd Civil Engineer Squadron
      - 433rd Security Forces Squadron
      - 433rd Logistics Readiness Squadron
    - 433rd Medical Group
      - 433rd Aeromedical Staging Squadron
      - 433rd Aerospace Medicine Squadron
      - 433rd Medical Squadron

Air National Guard (ANG)

- Texas Air National Guard
  - 149th Fighter Wing (JBSA-Lackland)
    - Headquarters 149th Fighter Wing
    - 149th Medical Group
    - 149th Operations Group
      - 182nd Fighter Squadron – General Dynamics F-16C Fighting Falcon
    - 149th Maintenance Group
      - 149th Aircraft Maintenance Squadron
      - 149th Maintenance Squadron
    - 149th Mission Support Group
      - 149th Civil Engineer Squadron
      - 149th Communications Flight
      - 149th Mission Support Flight
      - 149th Security Forces Squadron
      - 149th Logistics Readiness Squadron

=== United States Army ===
United States Army Medical Command (MEDCOM)

- Headquarters US Army Medical Command (JBSA-Fort Sam Houston)
- Brooke Army Medical Center (JBSA-Fort Sam Houston)
- Regional Health Command – Central (JBSA-Fort Sam Houston)
- Medical Research and Material Command
  - US Army Institute of Surgical Research (GSU) (JBSA-Fort Sam Houston)

United States Army Medical Department (AMEDD)

- US Army Medical Center of Excellence (MEDCoE)
  - 32nd Medical Brigade (JBSA-Fort Sam Houston)
    - Headquarters 32nd Medical Brigade
    - 187th Medical Battalion
    - 188th Medical Battalion
    - 232nd Medical Battalion
    - 264th Medical Battalion
  - United States Army Veterinary Corps (JBSA-Fort Sam Houston)
    - Headquarters US Army Veterinary Corps
  - United States Army Medical Test and Evaluation Activity (USAMTEAC) (JBSA-Fort Sam Houston)
    - Headquarters US Army Medical Test and Evaluation Activity
    - Information Management/Information Technology Test and Evaluation Branch

United States Army Materiel Command (AMC)

- United States Army Installation Management Command (IMCOM)
  - Headquarters US Army Installation Management Command (JBSA-Fort Sam Houston)
  - Army Support Activity – JBSA
  - Fort Sam Houston Mission Training Complex (JBSA-Camp Bullis)
- United States Army Contracting Command (ACC)
  - Mission and Installation Contracting Command (MICC) (JBSA-Fort Sam Houston)
    - Field Directorate Office – Fort Sam Houston

United States Army South (USARSO)

- Headquarters US Army South (JBSA-Fort Sam Houston)
  - 512th Engineer Detachment

United States Army North (ARNORTH)

- Headquarters US Army North (JBSA-Fort Sam Houston)
  - 323rd US Army Band

United States Army Recruiting Command (USAREC)

- 5th Recruiting Brigade
- Headquarters 5th Recruiting Brigade (JBSA-Fort Sam Houston)
    - San Antonio Recruiting Battalion

United States Army Cyber Command (ARCYBER)

- United States Army Network Enterprise Technology Command (NETCOM)
  - 7th Signal Command
    - Regional Network Enterprise Center – Southwest (JBSA-Fort Sam Houston)
    - 106th Signal Brigade (GSU) (JBSA-Fort Sam Houston)
    - 56th Signal Battalion

United States Army Intelligence and Security Command (INSCOM)

- 470th Military Intelligence Brigade
  - Headquarters 470th Military Intelligence Brigade (JBSA-Fort Sam Houston)
    - 470th Headquarters Company
    - 312th Military Intelligence Battalion
    - 717th Military Intelligence Battalion (JBSA-Lackland)

United States Army Civilian Human Resources Agency

- Fort Sam Houston Civilian Personnel Advisory Center (CPAC) (JBSA-Fort Sam Houston)

United States Army Reserve (USAR)

- Medical Readiness and Training Command
  - Headquarters Medical Readiness and Training Command
  - 2nd Medical Training Brigade
    - 7304th Medical Training Support Battalion (GSU) (JBSA-Fort Sam Houston)
  - 3rd Medical Training Brigade
    - 7307th MES Battalion
- 377th Theater Sustainment Command
  - 4th Expeditionary Sustainment Command (GSU) (JBSA-Fort Sam Houston)
    - Headquarters 4th Expeditionary Sustainment Command
- 1st Battalion
  - 355th Regiment Detachment 1 (JBSA-Camp Bullis)
- US Army Reserve Careers Group
  - 12th Battalion (JBSA-Camp Bullis) (GSU)
- 6th Battalion
  - 95th Regiment (JBSA-Camp Bullis)
- 699th Construction Management Team (JBSA-Camp Bullis)
- 917th Engineer Facility Detachment (JBSA-Camp Bullis)
- US Army Reserve Operational Group
- Military Intelligence Readiness Command (MIRC)
  - 505th Military Intelligence Brigade (GSU) (JBSA-Camp-Bullis)
    - 505th Headquarters Company
    - 549th Military Intelligence Brigade
      - Alpha Company
      - Bravo Company

United States Army National Guard (ARNG)

- Texas Army National Guard
  - 236th Military Police Company (JBSA-Fort Sam Houston)
  - 71st Expeditionary Military Intelligence Brigade (JBSA-Fort Sam Houston)
  - 636th Military Intelligence Battalion (JBSA-Fort Sam Houston)
    - Headquarters Company
    - Bravo Company
  - 640th Military Intelligence Platoon
    - Detachment 1 (GSU) (JBSA-Fort Sam Houston)
- Foreign Military Sales – Fort Sam Houston (JBSA-Fort Sam Houston)
- 102nd General Support Battalion (JBSA-Fort Sam Houston)
  - Headquarters Company
  - Operations Support Company
- 1st Battalion
  - 141st Infantry Regiment
  - Delta Company (JBSA-Camp Bullis)
- 536th Brigade Support Battalion
  - Golf Company (GSU) (JBSA-Camp Bullis)
- 162nd Area Support Medical Company (JBSA-Camp Bullis)
- 111th Multi-functional Medical Battalion (JBSA-Camp Bullis)
- Texas Army National Guard Medical Detachment
  - Detachment 3 (JBSA-Camp Bullis)
- Region 3 Recruiting and Retention Battalion
  - Charlie Company (JBSA-Camp Bullis)
- 197th Support Company (JBSA-Camp Bullis)
- 5th Battalion, 19th Special Forces Group (GSU)
  - A Company (JBSA-Camp Bullis)
  - C Company (JBSA-Camp Bullis)

=== United States Navy ===
Bureau of Medicine and Surgery (BUMED)

- Naval Medical Research Center
  - Naval Medical Research Unit – San Antonio (GSU) (JBSA-Fort Sam Houston)

Naval Education and Training Command (NETC)

- Center for Security Forces (CENTSECFOR)
  - Naval Technical Training Center Lackland (GSU) (JBSA-Lackland)

United States Navy Recruiting Command (NRC)

- Region West
  - Navy Talent Acquisition Group San Antonio (GSU) (JBSA-Fort Sam Houston)

United States Navy Reserve (USNR)

- Navy Operations Support Center – San Antonio (JBSA-Fort Sam Houston)

=== United States Marine Corps ===
United States Marine Corps Intelligence

- Marine Cryptologic Support Battalion (MCSB)
  - Hotel Company (JBSA-Fort Sam Houston)

Marine Corps Reserves

- 4th Marine Division
  - 4th Reconnaissance Battalion (GSU) (JBSA-Fort Sam Houston)
    - H&S Company
    - Charlie Company

=== US Department of Defense ===
Defense Health Agency (DHA)

- Medical Education and Training Campus (METC) (JBSA-Fort Sam Houston)

National Security Agency (NSA)

- Texas Cryptologic Center (JBSA-Lackland)

=== US Department of Homeland Security ===
Transportation Security Administration (TSA)

- TSA Canine Training Center

== Former Bases ==
- Brooks Air Force Base
- Kelly Air Force Base
