= John T. Wilcox =

U.S. Air Force general

John T. Wilcox II
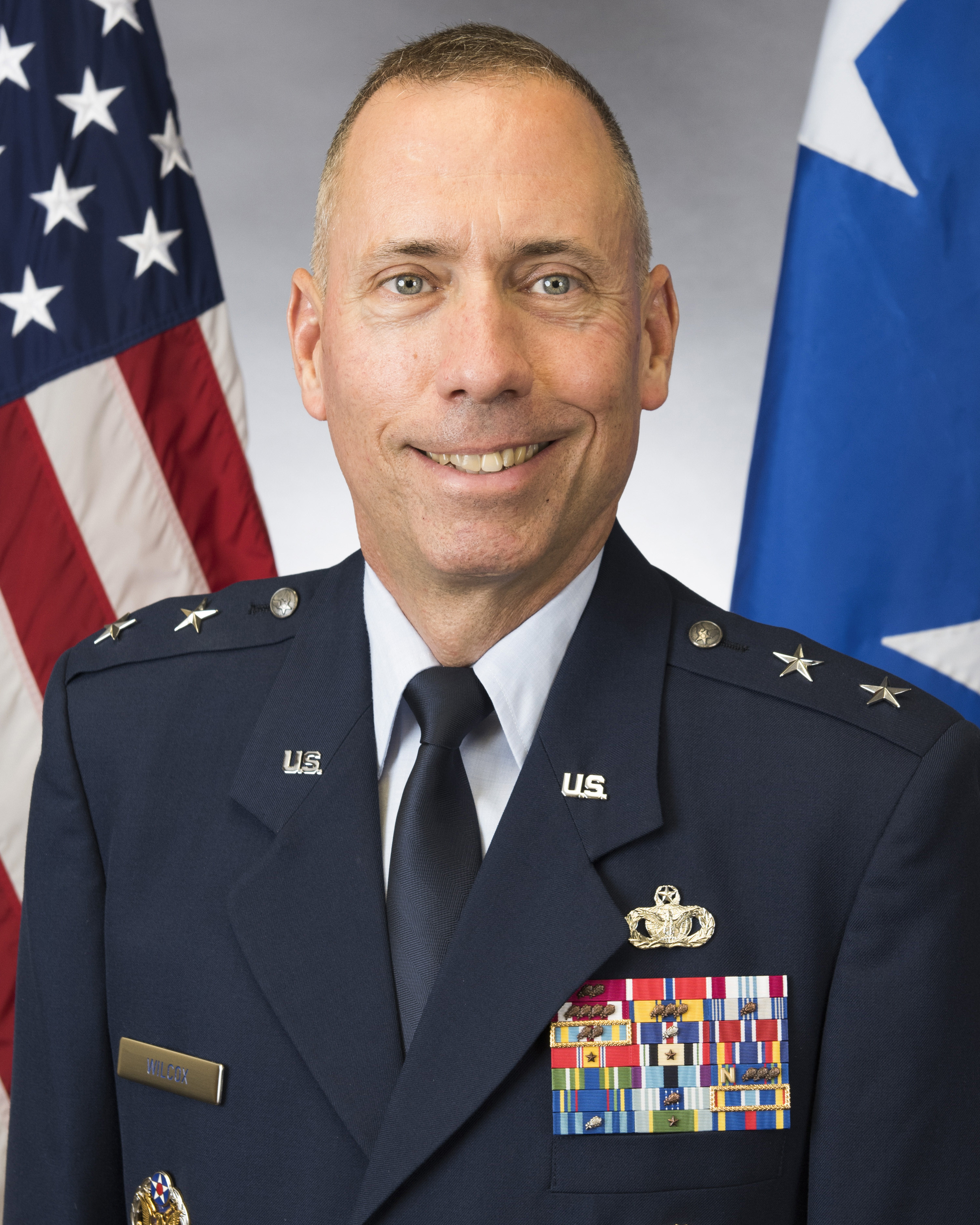
- Military career
- Allegiance: United States
- Branch: United States Air Force
- Service years: 1992–2022
- Rank: Major General
- Commands: Air Force Installation and Mission Support Center; 341st Missile Wing; 90th Security Forces Group; 2nd Security Forces Squadron
- Awards: Legion of Merit (3)

John T. Wilcox II is a retired United States Air Force major general who served as the Commander of the Air Force Installation and Mission Support Center. Previously, he was the Director of Operations and Communications of the Air Force Global Strike Command.

Military offices
Preceded by Robert W. Stanley II	Commander of the 341st Missile Wing; 2014–2016	Succeeded by Ronald G. Allen Jr.
Preceded by Ferdinand Stoss	Director of Strategic Plans, Programs, and Requirements of the Air Force Global Strike Command; 2016–2018	Succeeded by Gerald Goodfellow
Preceded by Gentry W. Boswell	Director of Operations and Communications of the Air Force Global Strike Command; 2018–2019	Succeeded by Jason Armagost
Preceded by Bradley D. Spacy	Commander of the Air Force Installation and Mission Support Center; 2019–2022	Succeeded by John J. Allen
