= Air Force Services Center =

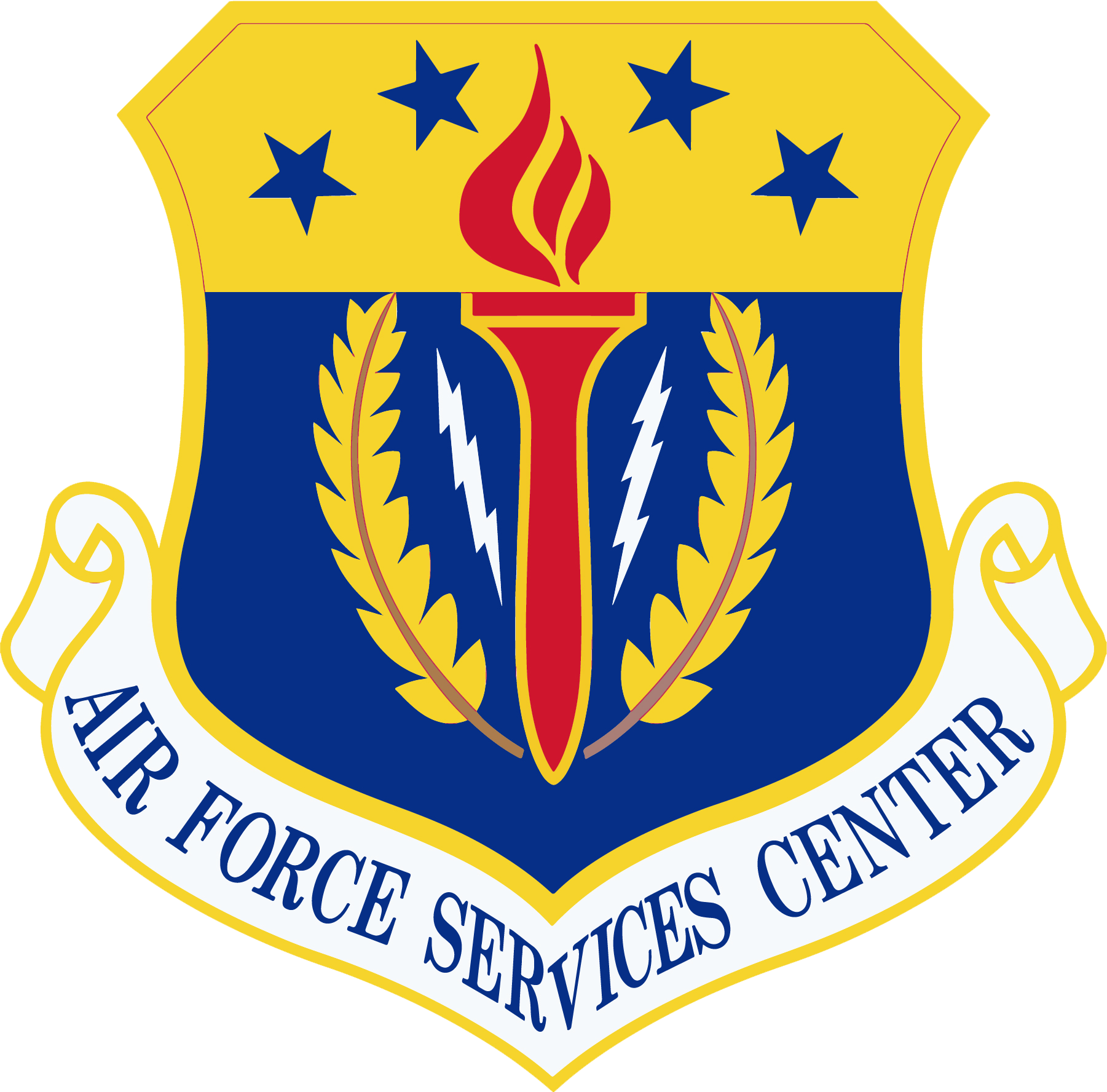
- Air Force Services Center Shield
- Active: 5 February 1991 - 1 June 2012; 15 Dec 2014 - present
- Country: United States of America
- Branch: United States Air Force
- Role: Support
- Part of: Air Force Installation and Mission Support Center
- Garrison/HQ: JBSA-Lackland, Texas
- Nickname(s): AFSVC
- Decorations: Air Force Outstanding Unit Award; Air Force Organizational Excellence Award

The Air Force Services Center (AFSVC) is a subordinate unit to the Air Force Installation and Mission Support Center (AFIMSC) and is headquartered at JBSA-Lackland, Texas. Its mission is to deliver services programs and activities to build and sustain ready and resilient Airmen and families. AFSVC supports the bases, MAJCOMs and Air Staff by providing technical assistance, new initiatives, developing programs and procedures and managing central support functions. AFSVC ensures successful operation of essential food, fitness, child care, lodging and recreation opportunities for military members and their families. The center's responsibilities include preparing responses to high-level inquiries, providing technical assistance to the field and developing new programs that support major command and installation activities.

== History ==
The first iteration of the AFSVC was established as the Air Force Moral, Welfare and Recreation Center on 5 February 1991 as a Field Operating Agency under Headquarters, U.S. Air Force Services. It held this name briefly until it was re-designated as the Moral, Welfare and Recreation Agency on 1 August 1991. The Agency was re-designated again as the Moral, Welfare and Recreation Services Agency on 2 Oct 1992. The Agency was once again re-designated, now as the Air Force Services Agency (AFSVA) on 1 Jan 1994. It held this designation until the Agency was inactivated on 1 June 2012. A few years later, the organization was reactivated as the Air Force Services Activity on 15 Dec 2014 under the Air Force Materiel Command. The Activity then became a subordinate unit to the Air Force Installation and Mission Support Center (AFIMSC) on 6 April 2015. AFIMSC then re-designated the AFSVA as the Air Force Services Center on 1 June 2019.
