= Air Force Security Forces Center =

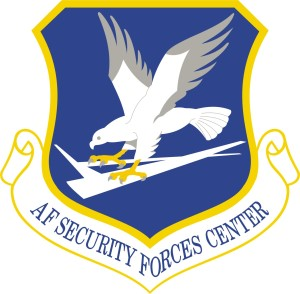
- Air Force Security Forces Center Shield
- Active: 1 September 1979 – present
- Country: United States
- Branch: United States Air Force
- Garrison/HQ: Lackland Air Force Base

Commanders
- Current commander: Colonel Gregory R. Bodenstein

The Air Force Security Forces Center (AFSFC) organizes, trains, and equips Air Force security forces worldwide. It develops force protection doctrine, programs, and policies by planning and programming resources to execute the missions of nuclear and non-nuclear weapon system security, physical security, integrated defense, combat arms, law enforcement, anti-terrorism, resource protection, and corrections. It identifies and delivers emergent and future force protection and force application solutions through modeling and simulation. It acts as the executive agency for the Department of Defense military working dog program.

== See also ==
- United States Air Force Security Forces
- Air Force Security Forces Center Web Page
