= Andrew Gebara =

U.S. Air Force general officer

Andrew J. Gebara
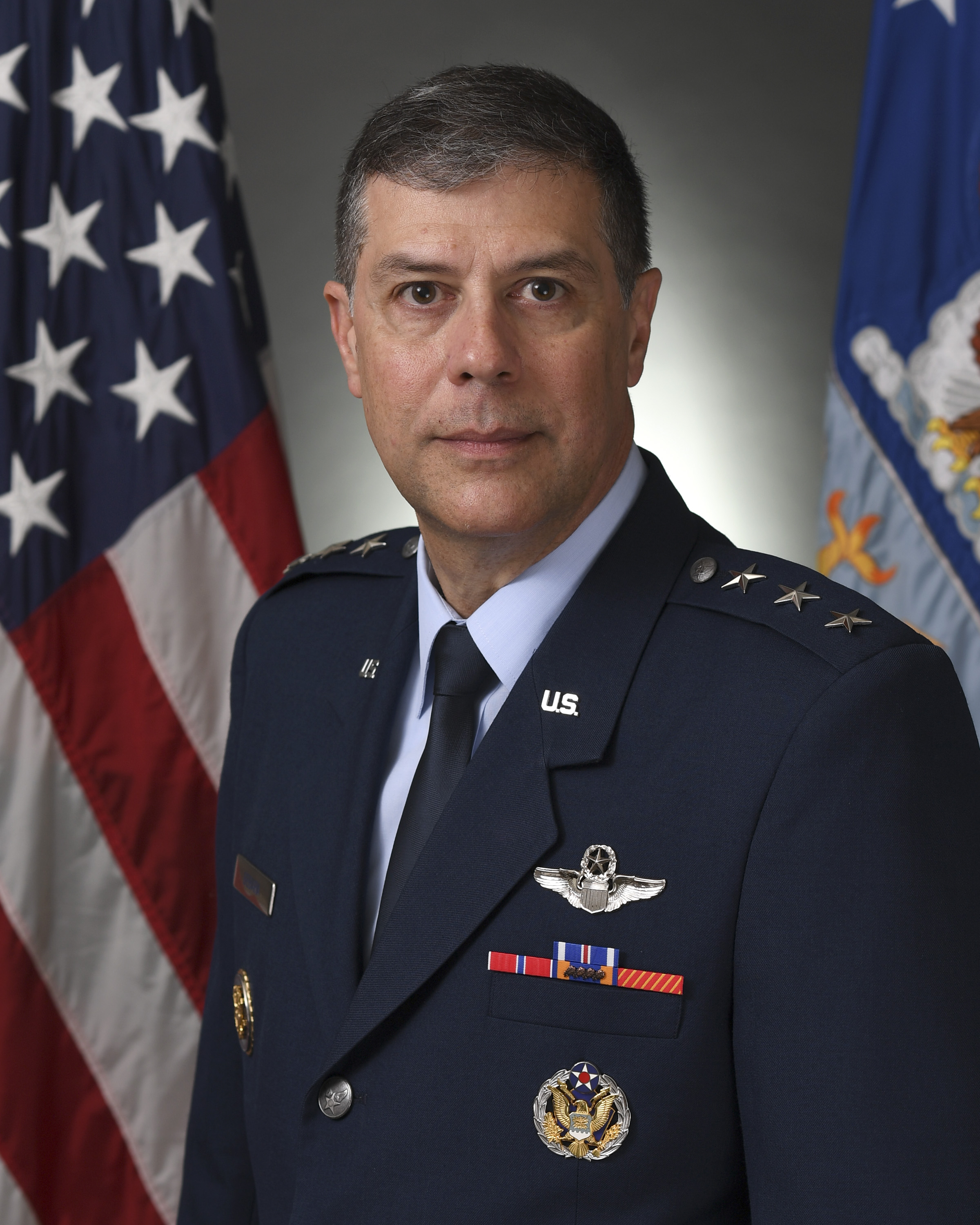
- Born: c. 1969 (age 56–57)
- Military career
- Allegiance: United States
- Branch: United States Air Force
- Service years: 1991–present
- Rank: Lieutenant General
- Commands: Eighth Air Force; 2nd Bomb Wing; 325th Weapons Squadron
- Conflicts: Operation Allied Force; War in Afghanistan
- Awards: Air Force Distinguished Service Medal; Defense Superior Service Medal (3); Legion of Merit (2); Distinguished Flying Cross; Bronze Star Medal

Andrew J. Gebara (born c. 1969) is a United States Air Force lieutenant general who served as the deputy chief of staff for strategic deterrence and nuclear integration of the United States Air Force. He served as commander of the Eighth Air Force from 2021 to 2023.

In January 2023, Gebara was nominated for promotion to lieutenant general and assignment as deputy chief of staff for strategic deterrence and nuclear integration of the United States Air Force. In July 2025, he was nominated for reappointment as a lieutenant general and assignment as the director of staff of the United States Air Force.

Military offices
Preceded by Timothy G. Fay	Commander to the 2nd Bomb Wing; 2012–2014	Succeeded by Kristin Goodwin
Preceded by Mark E. Weatherington	Commander of the Eighth Air Force; 2021–2023	Succeeded by Jason R. Armagost
Preceded by James C. Dawkins	Deputy Chief of Staff for Strategic Deterrence and Nuclear Integration of the United States Air Force; 2023–2026	Succeeded by Brandon D. Parker
Preceded by Scott L. Pleus	Director of Staff of the United States Air Force; 2026–present	Incumbent
