= Eighth Air Force Scouting Forces =

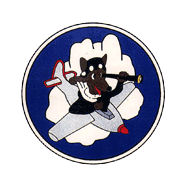
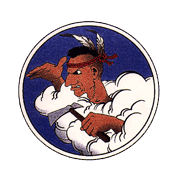
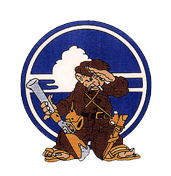
- 1st Scouting Force 2d Scouting Force 3d Scouting Force
- Active: September 1944-April 1945
- Country: United States
- Branch: United States Army Air Forces
- Type: Reconnaissance, Intelligence
- Part of: Eighth Air Force

The Scouting Forces were several fighter flights formed by Eighth Air Force during World War II with a mission to check for Anti-Aircraft (flak) sites; weather conditions, and for Luftwaffe interceptor airfields and units in advance of heavy bomber missions over Occupied Europe and Nazi Germany.

These flights were created by Colonel Bud J. Peaslee, commander of the 384th Bombardment Group. Colonel Peaslee suggested this to General James Doolittle in 1944 as a way to gather real-time intelligence prior to bombing missions by Eighth Air Force.

During their 6 months of existence, the Eighth Air Force Scouting Forces lost 24 pilots: 9 in training and 15 in combat.

== 1st Scouting Force ==
The 1st Scouting Force (experimental) (P-38 Lightning; P-51 Mustang) was organized at RAF Honington, and activated on 19 September 1944. It was assigned as a flight, attached to the 67th Fighter Wing, 364th Fighter Group. The group maintained its logistics, and detached pilots on a 15-day rotational basis. The unit flew 107 missions before being attached to the 857th Bombardment Squadron at RAF Bassingbourn, and logged another 24 missions.

== 2d Scouting Force ==
The 2nd Scouting Force (P-47 Thunderbolt; P-51 Mustang) was formed at RAF Steeple Morden, and activated on 26 September 1944. It was assigned as a flight, attached to the 65th Fighter Wing, 355th Fighter Group. The unit's pilots were assigned from several different fighter units, and successfully finished 136 missions, with the last mission being flown on 21 April 1945.

== 3d Scouting Force ==
The 3d Scouting Force (P-47 Thunderbolt; P-51 Mustang; B-17 Flying Fortress) was formed at RAF Wormingford, with the support of the 55th Fighter Group. Although originated as a flight of the 55th FG, the 3rd Scouting Force established itself as an independent entity. At the beginning, the pilots of the 55th FG were detached to fly the P-51D's as scouts, but quickly they were replaced by assigned personnel.

The 3rd Scouting Force conducted the first of its 140 missions on 15 October 1944, and the last mission on 21 April 1945. The 3rd SF had the uniqueness of having some older B-17F's assigned for doing weather reconnaissance.

Although the 3rd Scouting Force was not meant for combat, the unit downed 22 German fighters while defending bombers.
