= James C. Dawkins =

U.S. Air Force Lieutenant general

James C. Dawkins Jr.
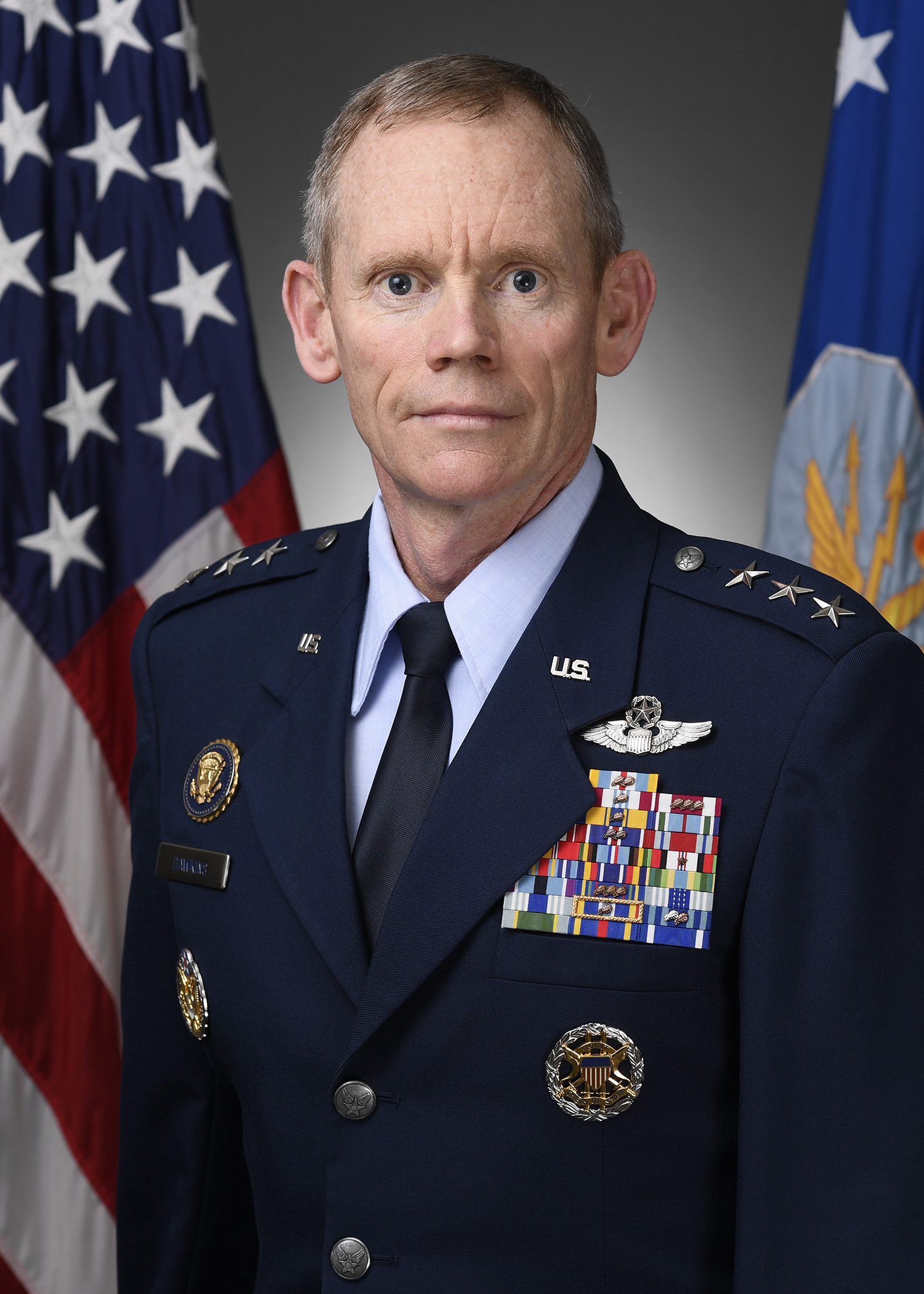
- Military career
- Allegiance: United States
- Branch: United States Air Force
- Service years: 1989–2023
- Rank: Lieutenant general
- Commands: Eighth Air Force; 5th Bomb Wing; 509th Operations Group; 338th Combat Training Squadron
- Conflicts: War in Afghanistan
- Awards: Air Force Distinguished Service Medal; Defense Superior Service Medal (3); Legion of Merit (2)

James C. "Jim" Dawkins Jr. is a retired United States Air Force lieutenant general who served as Deputy Chief of Staff for Strategic Deterrence and Nuclear Integration of the United States Air Force from 2020 to 2023. He previously served as the director of global power programs of the Office of the Assistant Secretary of the Air Force for Acquisition, Technology and Logistics.

== Effective dates of promotions ==
Rank	Date
Second lieutenant	March 17, 1989
First lieutenant	March 17, 1991
Captain	March 17, 1993
Major	July 1, 2000
Lieutenant colonel	April 1, 2005
Colonel	October 1, 2008
Brigadier general	February 7, 2014
Major general	August 2, 2017
Lieutenant general	October 1, 2020

Military offices
Preceded by Douglas A. Cox	Commander of the 5th Bomb Wing; 2011–2013	Succeeded by Alex Mezynski
Preceded by Sandra Finan	Principal Assistant Deputy Administrator for Military Applications of the National Nuclear Security Administration; 2013–2014	Succeeded by Stephen L. Davis
Preceded by ???	Director of Strategic Capabilities Policy of the United States National Security Council; 2014–2016	Succeeded by David Kriete
Preceded by Thomas A. Bussiere	Deputy Director for Nuclear, Homeland Defense, and Current Operations of the Joint Staff; 2016–2018	Succeeded by Michael Lutton
Preceded by Thomas A. Bussiere	Commander of the Eighth Air Force; 2018–2020	Succeeded by Mark E. Weatherington
Preceded by David A. Krumm	Director for Global Power Programs in the Office of the Assistant Secretary Acquisition, Technology & Logistics; 2020	Succeeded by Stephen L. Davis
Preceded by Richard M. Clark	Deputy Chief of Staff for Strategic Deterrence and Nuclear Integration of the United States Air Force; 2020–2023	Succeeded by Andrew J. Gebara
