= Eighth Air Force =

Numbered air force of the United States Air Force

Eighth Air Force (Air Forces Strategic)
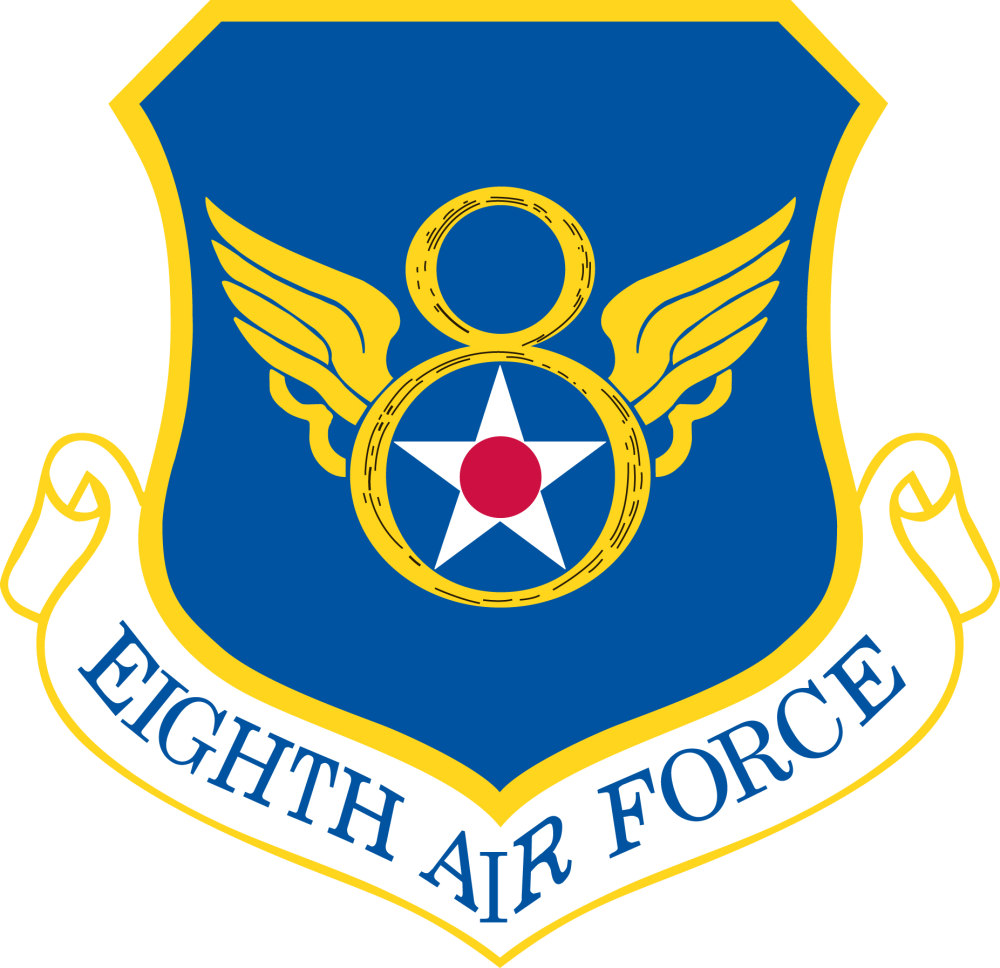
- The Shield of the Eighth Air Force
- Active: 3 June 2008 – present (as Eighth Air Force (Air Forces Strategic)); 22 February 1944 – 3 June 2008 (as Eighth Air Force); 19 January 1942 – 22 February 1944 (as VIII Bomber Command) (84 years, 7 months)
- Country: United States
- Branch: United States Air Force (18 September 1947 – present); United States Army ( Army Air Forces, 19 January 1942 – 18 September 1947)
- Type: Numbered Air Force
- Role: Provides conventional and nuclear bomber forces to U.S. Strategic Command and serves as the air component for global strike for U.S. Strategic Command
- Part of: Air Force Global Strike Command; U.S. Strategic Command
- Headquarters: Barksdale Air Force Base, Bossier Parish, Louisiana, U.S.
- Nickname: "The Mighty Eighth" (Note: The Eighth Air Force's now commonly-accepted nickname, "The Mighty Eighth", derives from the title of British farmer and life-long Eighth Air Force historian Roger A. Freeman's seminal History of the U.S. 8th Army Air Force (Doubleday and Company, 1970).)
- Motto: "Peace Through Strength"
- Engagements: World War II – European-African-Middle Eastern Theater World War II – Asiatic-Pacific Theater

- Decorations: Air Force Outstanding Unit Award with Combat "V" Device Air Force Outstanding Unit Award Republic of Vietnam Gallantry Cross with Palm

Commanders
- Current commander: Maj Gen Ty W. Neuman
- Mobilization Assistant to the Commander: Brig Gen Scheid P. Hodges
- Command Chief: CCM Brandon M. Wolfgang
- Notable commanders: James Doolittle; Ira C. Eaker; Carl "Tooey" Spaatz; Samuel E. Anderson

The Eighth Air Force (Air Forces Strategic) is a numbered air force (NAF) of the United States Air Force's Air Force Global Strike Command (AFGSC). It is headquartered at Barksdale Air Force Base, Louisiana. The command serves as Air Forces Strategic – Global Strike, one of the air components of United States Strategic Command (USSTRATCOM). The Eighth Air Force includes the heart of America's heavy bomber force: the Northrop Grumman B-2 Spirit stealth bomber, the Rockwell B-1 Lancer supersonic bomber, and the Boeing B-52 Stratofortress heavy bomber aircraft.

VIII Bomber Command of the United States Army Air Forces was established early in 1942. The first combat units arrived in the United Kingdom in June and combat operations began in July with first heavy bomber operations in August. Its bomber units were deployed in the UK, chiefly around East Anglia. From June 1943 it was the daylight bombing part of the Combined Bomber Offensive against Germany.

VIII Bomber Command was redesignated as Eighth Air Force on 22 February 1944. The Eighth Army Air Force (8 AAF) was a United States Army Air Forces combat air force in the European theater of World War II (1939/41–1945), engaging in operations primarily in the Northern Europe area of responsibility; carrying out strategic bombing of enemy targets in France, the Low Countries, and Germany; and engaging in air-to-air fighter combat against enemy aircraft until the German capitulation in May 1945. It was the largest of the deployed combat Army Air Forces in numbers of personnel, aircraft, and equipment.

During the Cold War (1945–1991), 8 AF was one of three Numbered Air Forces of the United States Air Force's Strategic Air Command (SAC), with a three-star general headquartered at Westover Air Force Base, Massachusetts commanding USAF strategic bombers and missiles on a global scale. Elements of 8 AF engaged in combat operations during the Korean War (1950–1953); Vietnam War (1961–1975), as well as the Gulf War (Operation Desert Storm), (1990–1991) over Iraq and occupied Kuwait in the First Persian Gulf War.

== Overview ==
Eighth Air Force is one of two active duty numbered air forces in the Air Force Global Strike Command. Eighth Air Force, with headquarters at Barksdale Air Force Base in Bossier Parish, Louisiana, supports U.S. Strategic Command, and is designated as U.S. Strategic Command's Task Force 204, providing on-alert, combat-ready forces to the president. The mission of "The Mighty Eighth" is to safeguard America's interests through strategic deterrence and global combat power. Eighth Air Force controls long-range nuclear-capable bomber assets throughout the United States and overseas locations. Its flexible, conventional and nuclear deterrence mission provides the capability to deploy forces and engage enemy threats from home station or forward positioned, anywhere, any time. The 8th Air Force motto is "Peace Through Strength."

The Eighth Air Force team consists of more than 16,000 Regular Air Force (e.g., active duty), Air National Guard and Air Force Reserve professionals operating and maintaining a variety of aircraft capable of deploying air power to any area of the world. This air power includes the heart of America's heavy bomber force, deploying the Rockwell B-1 Lancer, Northrop Grumman B-2 Spirit and the Boeing B-52 Stratofortress. The Mighty Eighth's B-52 force consists of 76 bombers assigned to two active duty wings, the 2d Bomb Wing at Barksdale Air Force Base, Louisiana and the 5th Bomb Wing at Minot Air Force Base, North Dakota, and one reserve wing, the 307th Bomb Wing at Barksdale Air Force Base, Louisiana. The B-2 force consists of 20 bombers assigned to the active duty 509th Bomb Wing along with the Missouri Air National Guard's associate 131st Bomb Wing at Whiteman AFB, Missouri. The B-1 force consists of 62 bombers assigned to the active duty 7th Bomb Wing at Dyess AFB, Texas and the 28th Bomb Wing at Ellsworth AFB, South Dakota. The 131st Bomb Wing is operationally gained by AFGSC and 8 AF from the Air National Guard, while the 307th Bomb Wing is operationally gained from Air Force Reserve Command and 10th Air Force.

Major General Mark E. Weatherington assumed command of 8th Air Force on 12 June 2020.

== History: World War II to today ==
Eighth Air Force was established as VIII Bomber Command on 19 January 1942 and activated at Langley Field, Virginia on 1 February. It was reassigned to Savannah Army Air Base, Georgia on 10 February 1942. An advanced detachment of VIII Bomber Command was established at RAF Daws Hill, near RAF Bomber Command Headquarters at RAF High Wycombe, on 23 February in preparation for its units to arrive in the United Kingdom from the United States. The first combat group of VIII Bomber Command to arrive in the United Kingdom was the ground echelon of the 97th Bombardment Group, which arrived at RAF Polebrook and RAF Grafton Underwood on 9 June 1942.

=== Start of offensive operations against German-occupied territory ===
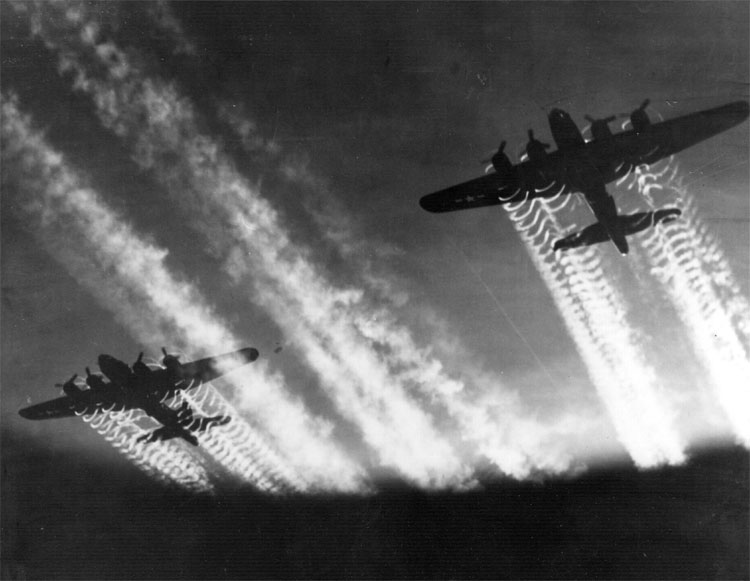
B-17 Flying Fortresses over Eastern Europe during World War II

VIII Bomber Command launched its first raid in North-western Europe on 4 July 1942, when six RAF Douglas Boston (A-20 Havoc) bombers flown by crews of the 15th Bombardment Squadron (Light), accompanied by another six Bostons from the more experienced No. 226 Squadron RAF, commanded by Captain Charles C. Kegelman attacked four airfields (Note: two American-crewed and one RAF-crewed Bostons against each target) in the Netherlands. Alerted to the attack, the airfield defences were prepared for the raid when it arrived. The right propeller of Kegelman's Boston was shot away by flak while over the target at De Kooy Airfield Further ground fire caused damage to his right wing, and the engine caught fire. Kegelman's aircraft lost altitude and even bounced off the ground, but he was able to bring the damaged bomber home and received the Distinguished Service Cross (DSC) from General Carl Spaatz on 11 July. This was the first DSC earned by a member of the Eighth Air Force in World War II. The other American-flown Boston had been shot down over De Kooy.

Regular combat operations by the VIII Bomber Command began on 17 August 1942, when the 97th Bombardment Group flew twelve Boeing B-17E Flying Fortresses on the first VIII Bomber Command heavy bomber mission of the war from RAF Grafton Underwood, attacking the Rouen-Sotteville marshalling yards in France. Colonel Frank A. Armstrong may have been the commander of the 97th, but at the time of the raid, not yet left seat qualified. On this mission, he sat in the co-pilot's seat of the lead B-17, Butcher Shop The pilot in command and leader of this historic mission was Paul Tibbets, who on 6 August 1945, dropped the first Atomic Bomb, Little Boy, on Hiroshima from the Boeing B-29 Superfortress, Enola Gay.

During World War II, the offensive air forces of the United States Army Air Forces (USAAF) came to be classified as strategic or tactical. A strategic air force was that with a mission to attack an enemy's war effort beyond his front-line forces, predominantly production and supply facilities, whereas a tactical air force supported ground campaigns, usually with objectives selected through co-operation with the armies.

In Europe, Eighth Air Force was the first USAAF strategic air force, with a mission to support an invasion of continental Europe from the British Isles. Eighth Air Force carried out strategic daytime bombing operations in Western Europe from airfields in eastern England as part of the Combined Bomber Offensive.

The Pointblank directive of June 1943 redirected the Allied strategic bombing effort against the German air force in order to reduce it to the point where it could not oppose the planned invasion of France in mid-1944. Also in June 1943, two groups of the Eight Air Force from England began training for the upcoming Operation Tidal Wave, a low-level raid on the Ploiești refineries in Romania. A third group, the 389th, which was originally scheduled to deploy to England, was also assigned to the mission. The groups were transferred to Libya in July, where together with the Ninth Air Force attacked targets in support of the Allied invasion of Sicily. A few weeks after Tidal Wave, the Eighth Air Force groups returned to England.

=== Reorganization ===

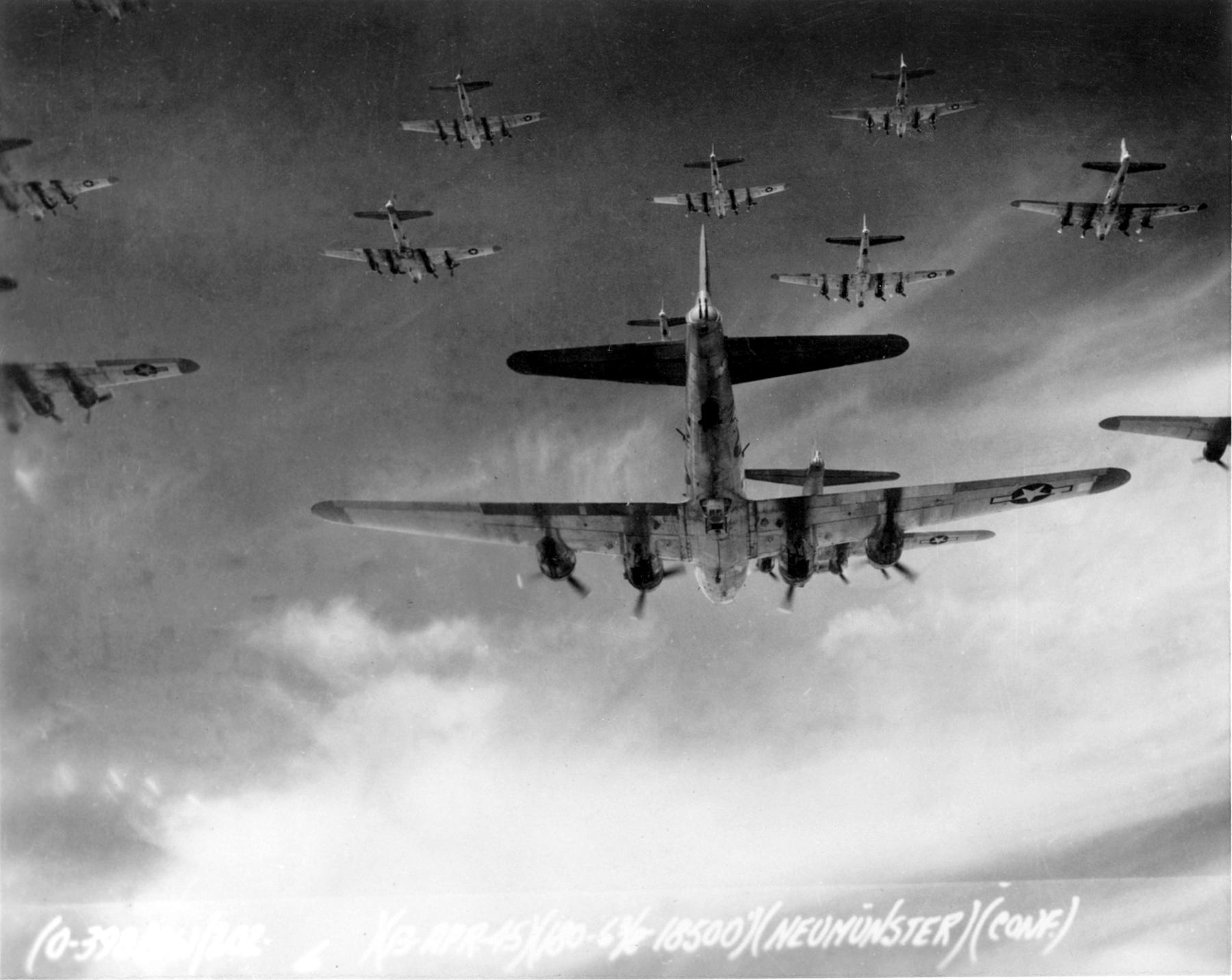
B-17 Flying Fortresses from the 398th Air Expeditionary Group fly a bombing run to Neumünster, Germany, on 13 April 1945; three weeks later, on 8 May, Nazi Germany surrendered, and Victory in Europe Day was declared.

External videos
- Target For Today – 1943 VIII Bomber Command film on YouTube

On 4 January 1944, the Consolidated B-24 Liberators and B-17s based in England flew their last mission as a subordinate part of VIII Bomber Command. On 22 February 1944, a massive reorganization of American airpower took place in Europe. The original Eighth Air Force was redesignated as the United States Strategic Air Forces (USSTAF). VIII Bomber Command, re-designated as Eighth Air Force, and Ninth Air Force were assigned to (USSTAF).

VIII Bomber Command, after redesignation as Eighth Air Force, was assigned VIII Fighter and VIII Air Support Commands under its command. This is from where the present-day Eighth Air Force's history, lineage and honors derive.

General Carl Spaatz returned to England to command the USSTAF. Major General Jimmy Doolittle relinquished command of the Fifteenth Air Force to Major General Nathan F. Twining and on January 6, 1944, took over command of the Eighth Air Force from Lieutenant General Ira C. Eaker at RAF Daws Hill. Doolittle was well known to American airmen as the famous "Tokyo Raider" and former air racer. His directive was simple: "Win the air war and isolate the battlefield."

Spaatz and Doolittle's plan was to use the US Strategic Air Forces in a series of co-ordinated raids, code-named Operation 'Argument' (popularly known as 'Big Week' ) and supported by RAF night bombing, on the German aircraft industry at the earliest possible date.

=== Big Week ===
Cold and clear weather was predicted for the last week of February 1944. On the night of 19–20 February, the RAF bombed Leipzig with 823 aircraft. The Eighth Air Force's effort was over 1,000 B-17s and B-24s and over 800 fighters. The RAF provided sixteen squadrons of North American P-51 Mustangs and Supermarine Spitfires. In all, twelve aircraft factories were attacked, with the B-17s heading to Leipzig – Junkers Ju 88 production and – Messerschmitt Bf 109 fighters), Bernburg-Strenzfeld (Junkers Ju 88 plant) and Oschersleben (AGO plant making Focke Wulf Fw 190A fighters).

The B-24s hit the Gothaer Waggonfabrik (production of Messerschmitt Bf 110 heavy fighters), the Fw 190 Arado Flugzeugwerke plant at Tutow and Heinkel's "Heinkel-Nord" headquarters at Rostock, which produced He 111 bombers. The Luftwaffe, conversely, was undertaking the sixth major raid of the "Baby Blitz" the following night (20/21 February), with only some 165 German aircraft sortieing against British targets.

The raids on the German aircraft industry comprising much of "Big Week" caused so much damage that the Germans were forced to disperse aircraft manufacturing eastward, to safer parts of the Reich.

The next day, over 900 bombers and 700 fighters of Eighth Air Force hit more aircraft factories in the Braunschweig area. Over 60 Luftwaffe fighters were shot down, with a loss of 19 US bombers and 5 US fighters. On 24 February, with the weather clearing over central Germany, the Eighth Air Force sent over 800 bombers, hitting Schweinfurt and attacks on the Baltic coast, with a total of 11 B-17s being lost. Some 230 B-24s hit the Messerschmitt Bf 110 assembly plant at Gotha with a loss of 24 aircraft.

On 22 February 1944, due to many mistakes, Nijmegen was bombed by twelve aircraft of the 446th Bombardment Group and two aircraft of the 453rd. They did not realize that they were over Dutch territory. 850 civilians, including children on their way to school, were among the casualties.

On 25 February, both the Eighth and Fifteenth Air Forces hit numerous targets at Fürth airfield, Augsburg and Regensburg, attacking Messerschmitt Bf 110 and Bf 109 plants. The 8th lost 31 bombers, the 15th lost 33.

=== Berlin ===
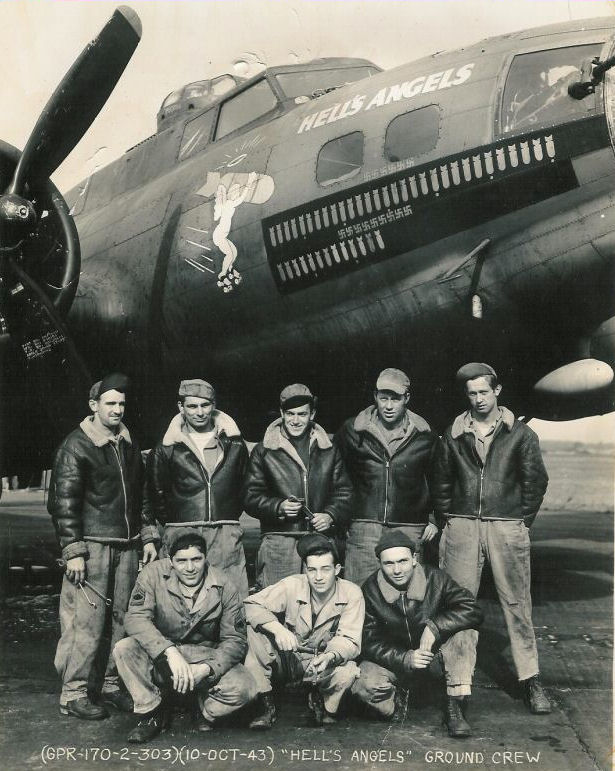
Aircraft and ground crew of the B-17 Flying Fortress of the 358th Bombardment Squadron and 303rd Bombardment Group, RAF Molesworth, known as the "Hell's Angels". This was the first B-17 to complete 25 combat missions in the Eighth Air Force, on 13 May 1943; after completing 48 missions, the aircraft returned to the United States on 20 January 1944, for a publicity tour.

Less than a week after "Big Week", Eighth Air Force made its first attack on the Reich's capital, Berlin. The RAF had been making night raids on Berlin since 1940 with heavy raids in 1943 and nuisance de Havilland Mosquito raids in daylight, but this was the first major daylight bombing raid on the German capital. On 6 March 1944, over 700 heavy bombers along with 800 escort fighters of the Eighth Air Force hit numerous targets within Berlin, dropping the first American bombs on the capital of the Third Reich. On 8 March, another raid of 600 bombers and 200 fighters hit the Berlin area again, destroying the VKF ball-bearing plant at Erkner. The following day, on 9 March, H2X radar-equipped B-17s mounted a third attack on the Reich capital through clouds. Altogether, the Eighth Air Force dropped over 4,800 tons of high explosive on Berlin during the first week of March. The photograph shows housing destroyed by the RAF during night raids.

On 22 March, over 800 bombers, led by H2X radar equipped bombers hit Berlin yet again, bombing targets through a thick rainy overcast causing more destruction to various industries. Because of the thick clouds and rain over the area the Luftwaffe did not attack the American bomber fleet, as the Germans believed that because of the weather the American bombers would be incapable of attacking their targets. Even so, the "pathfinder" bombers of the RAF Alconbury-based 482d Bomb Group proved very capable of finding the targets and guiding the bombers to them.

=== Prelude to Operation Overlord ===
In a prelude to the invasion of France, Allied strategic bomber forces were switched from industry to the transport network to isolate Normandy from enemy reinforcement routes. Air attacks by American forces against railroad junctions, airfields, ports and bridges in northern France and along the English Channel coastline began in February 1944. Fighters from both Eighth and Ninth Air Forces made wide sweeps over the area, mounting strafing missions at airfields and rail networks. By 6 June, Allied fighter pilots had succeeded in damaging or destroying hundreds of locomotives, thousands of motorized vehicles, and many bridges. In addition, German airfields in France and Belgium were attacked.

On 1 May, over 1,300 Eighth Air Force heavy bombers made an all-out attack on the enemy's rail network, striking at targets in France and Belgium. On 7 May, another 1,000 bombers hit additional targets along the English Channel coast, hitting fortifications, bridges and marshaling areas.

On D-Day, over 2,300 sorties were flown by Eighth Air Force heavy bombers in the Normandy and Cherbourg invasion areas, all aimed at neutralizing enemy coastal defenses and front-line troops.

=== Defeat of the Luftwaffe ===
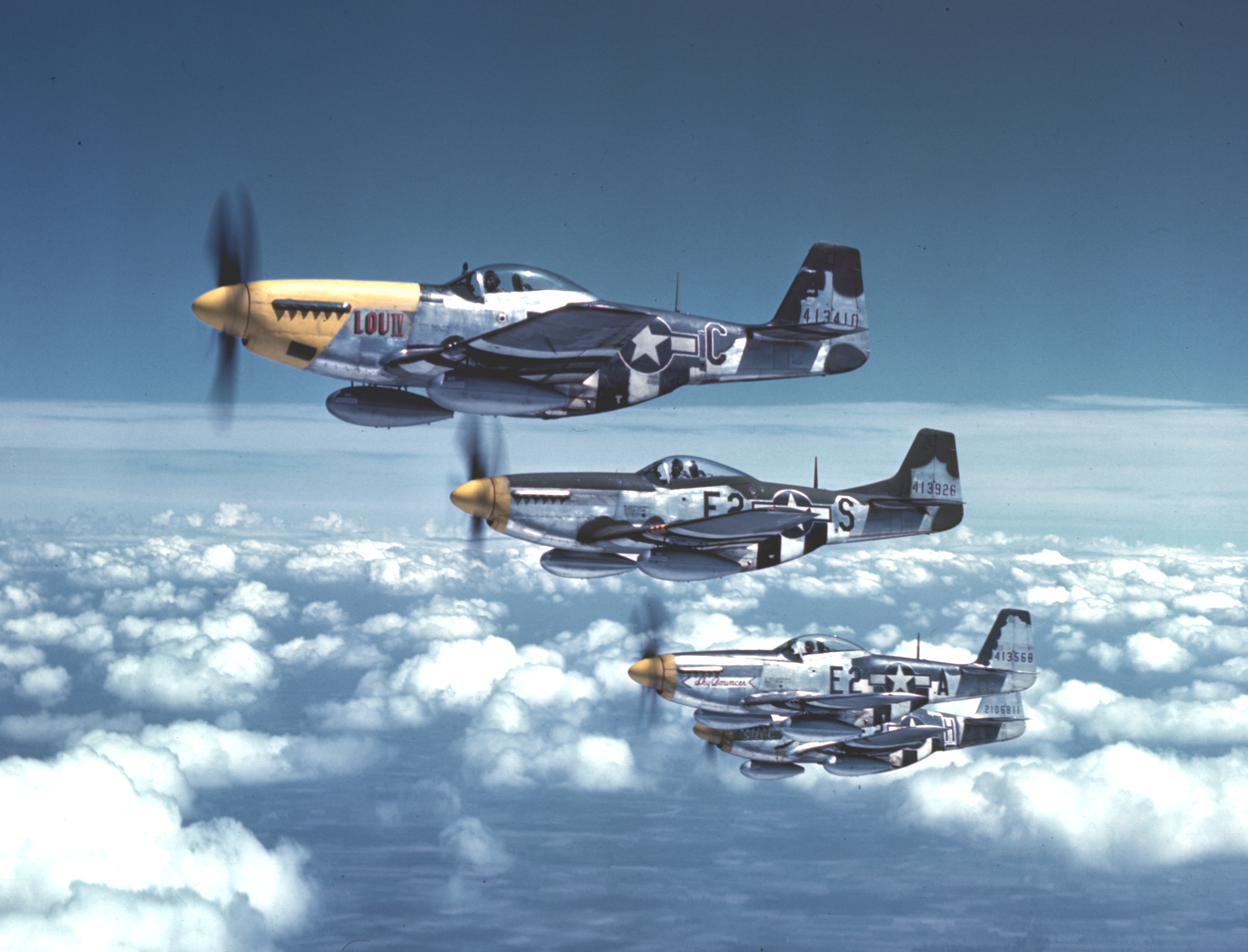
North American P-51 Mustangs from the 375th Fighter Squadron and 361st Fighter Squadron during World War II in July 1944

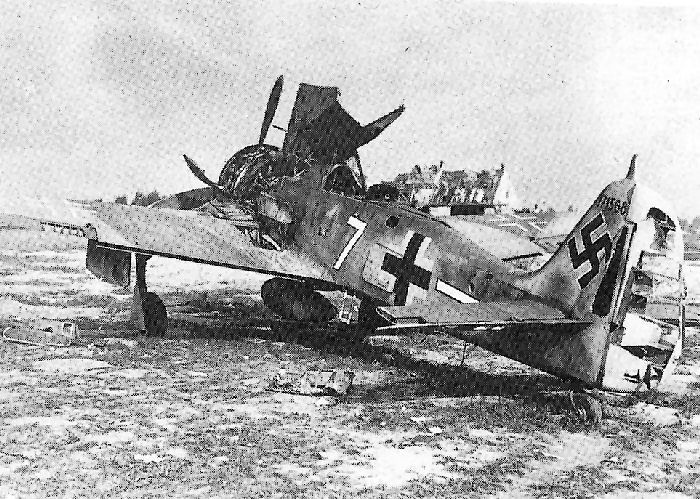
A destroyed Focke-Wulf Fw 190 in the Luftwaffe in 1945

The North American P-51 Mustang (Note: The P-51A variant known in RAF service as Mustang I (Mustang Mark I)) first entered squadron service in Europe with the British in early 1942; having much success with the RAF, although it found the Allison V-1710-engined aircraft's performance inadequate at higher altitudes. In mid-42 Rolls-Royce engineers rapidly realized that equipping the Mustang with a Rolls-Royce Merlin engine with its two speed, two stage supercharger would substantially improve performance. Also, by using a four-bladed propeller, rather than the three-bladed one used on the P-51A, the performance was greatly improved (Note: the XP-51B achieved a level speed of 441 mph at 29,800 ft (9,100 m), over 100 mph (160 km/h) faster than the Allison-engined P-51A at that altitude. At all heights, the rate of climb was approximately doubled.).

The USAAF now finally had an aircraft that could compete on equal terms with the Focke-Wulf Fw 190 and the later models of the Messerschmitt Bf 109. The USAAF was finally fully sold on the Mustang, and a letter contract for 2,200 P-51Bs was issued. The engine was to be the Packard V-1650-3, based on the Rolls-Royce Merlin Mk68.

In late 1943, the P-51B Mustang was introduced to the European Theater by the USAAF. It could fly as far on its internal fuel tanks as the P-47 could with drop tanks. However, the P-51B was introduced as a tactical fighter, so the first deliveries of the P-51B in November 1943 were assigned to three groups in the tactical Ninth Air Force at the expense of VIII Bomber Command, whose need for a long range escort fighter was critical. The first escort mission for the bombers was not flown until 5 December.

As the new commander of the Eighth Air Force since January 1944, Major General Jimmy Doolittle's major influence on the European air war occurred early that year when he made a critical change to the policy requiring escorting fighters to remain with the bombers at all times. With Doolittle's permission, American fighter pilots on bomber defense missions would primarily be flying far ahead of the bombers' combat box formations in air supremacy mode, literally "clearing the skies" of any Luftwaffe fighter opposition heading towards the target. This strategy fatally disabled the twin-engined Zerstörergeschwader heavy fighter wings and their replacement, single-engined Sturmgruppen of heavily armed Fw 190As, clearing each force of bomber destroyers in their turn from Germany's skies throughout most of 1944. As part of this game-changing strategy, especially after the bombers had hit their targets, the USAAF's fighters were then free to strafe German airfields and transport while returning to base, contributing significantly to the achievement of air superiority by Allied air forces over Europe.

The effect of the Mustangs, fully operating as an air supremacy fighter force, on the Luftwaffe defenders was arguably swift and decisive. The result was that the Luftwaffe was notable by its absence over the skies of Europe after D-Day and the Allies were starting to achieve air superiority over the continent. Although the Luftwaffe could, and did, mount effective attacks on the ever-larger formations of Allied heavy bombers, the sheer numbers of B-17s and B-24s attacking enemy targets was overwhelming the German fighter force, which simply could not sustain the losses the Eighth Air Force bombers and fighters were inflicting on it. In order to quickly assemble these formations, specially outfitted assembly ships were created from older bombers.

By mid-1944, Eighth Air Force had reached a total strength of more than 200,000 people (it is estimated that more than 350,000 Americans served in Eighth Air Force during the war in Europe). At peak strength, Eighth Air Force had forty heavy bomber groups, fifteen fighter groups, and four specialized support groups. It could, and often did, dispatch more than 2,000 four-engine bombers and more than 1,000 fighters on a single mission to multiple targets.

By 1945, all but one of the Eighth Air Force fighter groups were equipped with the P-51D.

=== Destroying the German oil industry ===
Eighth Air Force did not strike at oil industry targets until 13 May 1944 when 749 bombers, escorted by almost 740 fighters, pounded oil targets in the Leipzig area and at Brüx in Czechoslovakia. At the same time, a smaller force hit an Fw 190 repair depot at Zwickau. Over 300 German fighters attacked the bomber forces, losing almost half its aircraft, with claims of upwards of 47 Luftwaffe fighters by American fighter pilots. However, the Luftwaffe was successful in shooting down 46 bombers in a very unequal fight.

After D-Day, attacks on the German oil industry assumed top priority which was widely dispersed around the Reich. Vast fleets of B-24s and B-17s escorted by P-51Ds and long-range P-38Ls hit refineries in Germany and Czechoslovakia in late 1944 and early 1945. Having almost total air superiority throughout the collapsing German Reich, Eighth Air Force hit targets as far east as Hungary, while Fifteenth Air Force hit oil industry facilities in Yugoslavia, Romania, and northeastern Italy. On at least eighteen occasions, the Merseburg refineries in Leuna, where the majority of Germany's synthetic fuel for jet aircraft was refined, was hit. By the end of 1944, only three out of ninety-one refineries in the Reich were still working normally, twenty-nine were partially functional, and the remainder were completely destroyed.

=== Casualties and awards ===
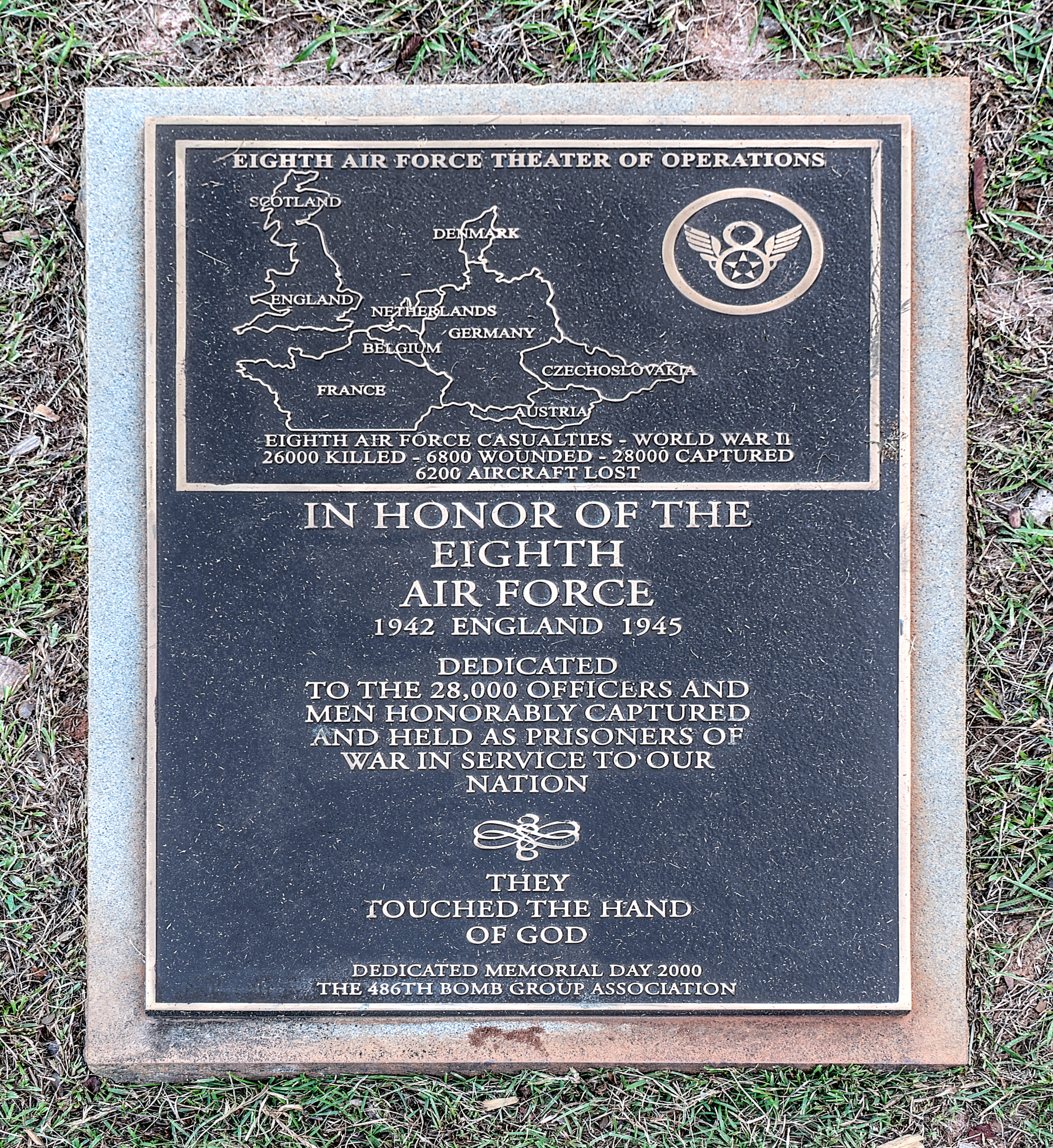
Memorial at Andersonville NHS

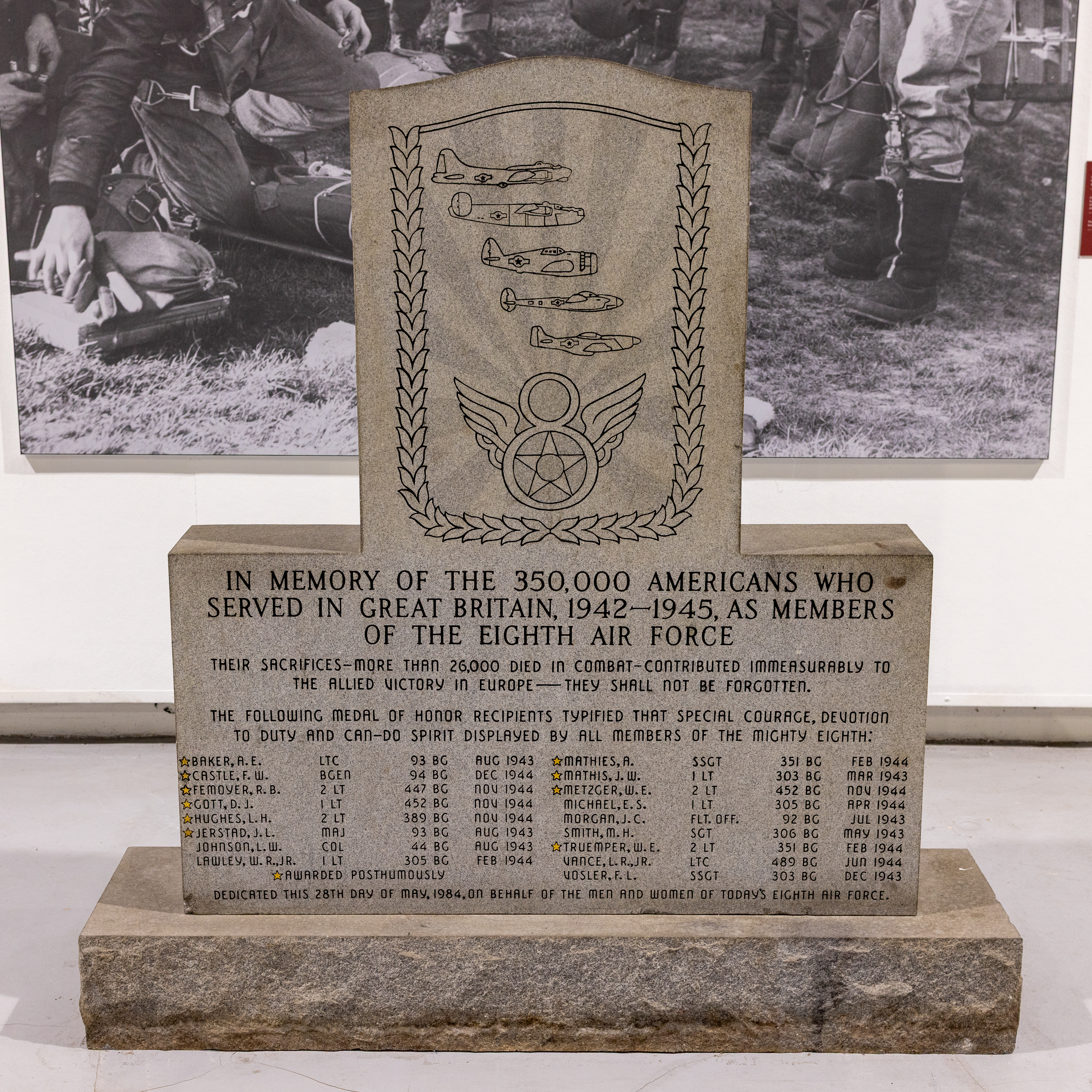
Memorial to Eighth Air Force's service in Britain during World War II, now at the Royal Air Force Museum London

These missions, however, carried a high price. Half of the U.S. Army Air Forces' casualties in World War II were suffered by Eighth Air Force (more than 47,000 casualties, with more than 26,000 dead). Seventeen Medals of Honor went to Eighth Air Force personnel during the war. By war's end, they had been awarded a number of other medals to include 220 Distinguished Service Crosses, and 442,000 Air Medals. Many more awards were made to Eighth Air Force veterans after the war that remain uncounted. There were 261 fighter aces in the Eighth Air Force during World War II. Thirty-one of these aces had 15 or more aircraft kills apiece. Another 305 enlisted gunners were also recognized as aces.

One notable Eighth Air Force casualty was Brigadier General Arthur W. Vanaman, Chief of Intelligence, who was captured by the Germans in northern France on 27 June 1944, becoming the highest-ranked American POW captured in Europe during the war.

=== Victory in Europe ===
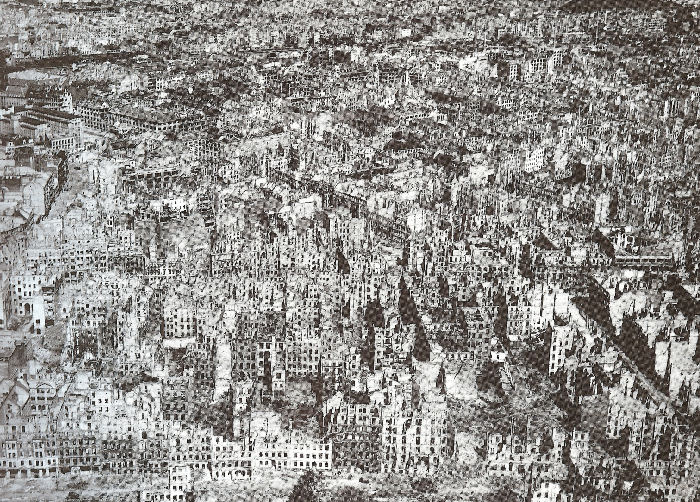
A destroyed Berlin following Royal Air Force bombing of it near the end of World War II in May 1945

In January 1945, the Luftwaffe attempted one last major air offensive against the Allied Air Forces. Over 950 fighters had been sent west from the Eastern Front for "Operation Bodenplatte". On 1 January, the entire German fighter force in the West, comprising combat aircraft from some eleven Jagdgeschwader day fighter wings, took off and attacked 27 Allied airfields in northern France, Belgium and the southern part of the Netherlands in an attempt by the Luftwaffe to cripple Allied air forces in the Low Countries of Europe. It was a last-ditch effort to keep up the momentum of the German forces during the stagnant stage of the Battle of the Bulge (Unternehmen Wacht am Rhein). The operation was a failure for the Luftwaffe as the losses suffered by the German air arm were irreplaceable and over 300 Luftwaffe aircraft were shot down, mostly by Allied anti-aircraft guns. The losses of the Allied Air Forces were replaced within weeks. The operation failed to achieve air superiority, even temporarily, and the German Army continued to be exposed to air attack.

First seen by Allied airmen during the late summer of 1944, it wasn't until March 1945 that German jet aircraft started to attack Allied bomber formations in earnest. On 2 March, when Eighth Air Force bombers were dispatched to attack the synthetic oil refineries at Leipzig, Messerschmitt Me 262As attacked the formation near Dresden. The next day, the largest formation of German jets ever seen, most likely from the Luftwaffe's specialist 7th Fighter Wing, Jagdgeschwader 7 Nowotny, made attacks on Eighth Air Force bomber formations over Dresden and the oil targets at Essen, shooting down a total of three bombers.

However, the Luftwaffe jets were simply too few and too late to have any serious effect on the Allied air armadas now sweeping over the Reich with near-impunity. A lack of fuel and available pilots for the new jets greatly reduced their effectiveness. The Me 262A was a difficult foe for the P-47s and P-51s, possessing a distinct speed advantage. Allied bomber escort fighters would fly high above the bombers – diving from this height gave them extra speed, thus reducing the speed difference. The Me 262 was also less maneuverable than the P-51 and so trained Allied pilots could turn tighter than an Me 262A. However, the only reliable way of dealing with the jets, as with the even faster Me 163B Komet rocket fighters, was to attack them on the ground and during takeoff and landing. Luftwaffe airfields that were identified as jet and rocket bases, such as Parchim and Bad Zwischenahn, were frequently bombed, and Allied fighters patrolled over the fields to attack jets trying to land. The Luftwaffe countered by installing flak alleys along the approach lines in order to protect the Me 262s from the ground and providing top cover with conventional fighters during takeoff and landing. Nevertheless, in March and April 1945, Allied fighter patrol patterns over Me 262 airfields resulted in numerous losses of jets and serious attrition of the force.

On 7 April 1945, the Luftwaffe flew its most desperate and deadliest mission, with the dedicated aerial ramming unit Sonderkommando Elbe. This operation involved German pilots of the unit ramming their worn-out Bf 109Gs, each barely armed with only one MG 131 machine gun and 50 rounds of ammunition, into American bombers in order to get the Allies to suspend bombing raids long enough for the Germans to make a significant amount of Me 262A jet fighters. The 8th Air Force was targeted in this operation. Fifteen Allied bombers were attacked, eight were successfully destroyed.

On 7 April, Eighth Air Force dispatched thirty-two B-17 and B-24 groups and fourteen Mustang groups (the sheer numbers of attacking Allied aircraft were so large in 1945 that they were now counted by the group) to targets in the small area of Germany still controlled by the Nazis, hitting the remaining airfields where the Luftwaffe jets were stationed. In addition, almost 300 German aircraft of all types were destroyed in strafing attacks. On 16 April, this record was broken when over 700 German aircraft were destroyed on the ground.

Eighth Air Force flew its last full-scale mission of the European War on 25 April 1945 when its B-17s hit the Skoda armaments factory at Plzeň in Czechoslovakia, and B-24s bombed rail complexes in Bad Reichenhall and Freilassing, surrounding Hitler's mountain retreat at Berchtesgaden.

=== Redeployment to Pacific Theater ===
Following the end of the war in Europe in May 1945 plans were made to transfer some of the B-17/B-24 heavy bomber groups of Eighth Air Force to the Pacific Theater of Operations and upgrade them to Boeing B-29 Superfortress Very Heavy (VH) bomb groups. As part of this plan, Eighth Air Force headquarters was reassigned to Sakugawa (Kadena Airfield), Okinawa, on 16 July 1945, being assigned to the United States Strategic Air Forces in the Pacific without personnel or equipment.

On Okinawa, Eighth Air Force derived its headquarters personnel from the inactivated XX Bomber Command, and Lieutenant General James H. Doolittle assumed command, being reassigned from England on 19 July. The command controlled three airfields on Okinawa, Bolo, Futema, and Kadena Airfield. The Eighth received its first B-29 Superfortress on 8 August 1945.

Eighth Air Force's mission in the Pacific was initially to organize and train new bomber groups for combat against Japan. In the planned invasion of Japan, the mission of Eighth Air Force would be to conduct B-29 Superfortress raids from Okinawa in coordination with Twentieth Air Force operating from airfields in the Mariana Islands.

Units assigned to Eighth Air Force in the Pacific were:

- Headquarters, 301st Fighter Wing

Ie Shima Airfield, Okinawa, 31 July – 29 November 1945
318th Fighter Group (P-47N Thunderbolt)

Ie Shima Airfield, Okinawa, 31 July – 29 November 1945

413th Fighter Group (P-47N Thunderbolt)

Ie Shima Airfield, Okinawa, 31 July – 29 November 1945

507th Fighter Group (P-47N Thunderbolt)

Ie Shima Airfield, Okinawa, 31 July – 29 January 1946

- Headquarters, 316th Bombardment Wing

Kadena Airfield Okinawa, 5 September 1945 – 7 June 1946
22d Bombardment Group, (B-29 Superfortress)

Kadena Airfield Okinawa, 15 August – 23 November 1945

333d Bombardment Group, (B-29 Superfortress)

Kadena Airfield, Okinawa, 5 August 1945 – 28 May 1946

346th Bombardment Group, (B-29 Superfortress)

Kadena Airfield, Okinawa, 7 August 1945 – 30 June 1946

382d Bombardment Group, (B-29 Superfortress

Northwest Field, Guam, 8 September – 16 December 1945
Note: Only 420th Bombardment Squadron of group arrived with B-29 Aircraft, 464th and 872d Bomb Squadrons only ground echelons arrived. Air Echelon of squadrons with assigned aircraft remained in United States until inactivation.

383d Bombardment Group, (B-29 Superfortress)

West Field, Tinian, 12 September – 19 December 1945

The atomic bombings of Japan led to the Japanese surrender before Eighth Air Force saw action in the Pacific theater. Eighth Air Force remained in Okinawa until 7 June 1946.

=== Strategic Air Command ===
The shield of the Strategic Air Command

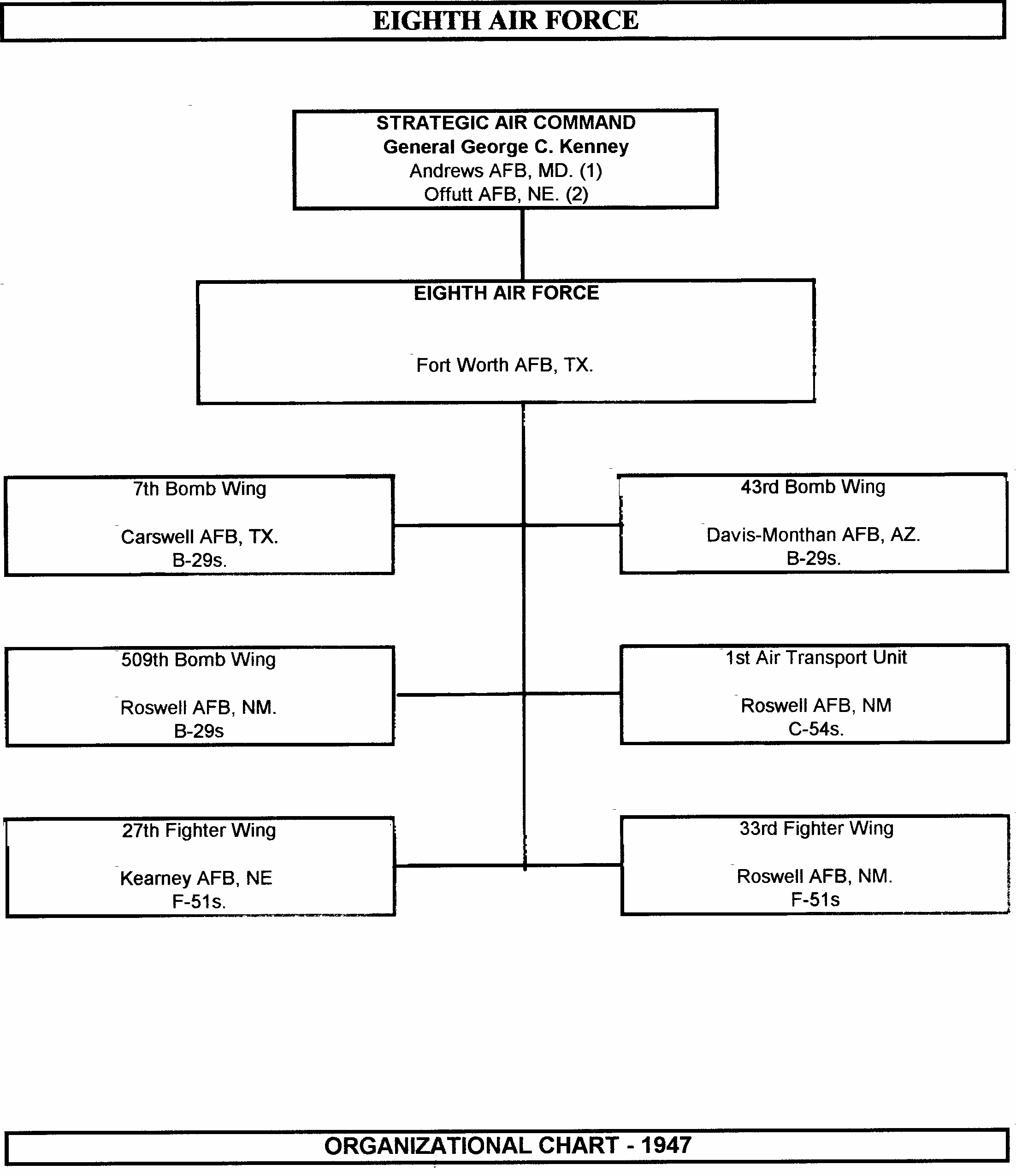
A 1947 organizational chart of the Eighth Air Force

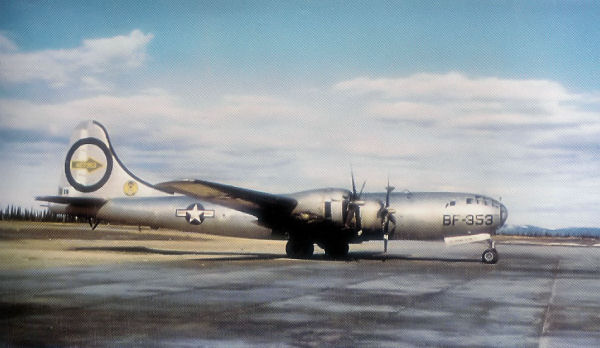
A B-29 Superfortress, The Great Artiste of the 509th Bomb Wing at Walker Air Force Base in Roswell, New Mexico

World War II proved what the proponents of air power had been championing for the previous two decades – the great value of strategic forces in bombing an enemy's industrial complex and of tactical forces in controlling the skies above a battlefield. As a result, Eighth Air Force was incorporated into the new SAC.

On 7 June 1946, Headquarters Eighth Air Force was reassigned without personnel or equipment from Okinawa to MacDill Field in Florida, becoming SAC's second numbered air force. At MacDill, Eighth Air Force headquarters were manned chiefly by personnel from the 58th Bombardment Wing, Very Heavy, stationed at Fort Worth Army Air Field in Fort Worth, Texas. The organization reported administratively to the Fifteenth Air Force in Colorado Springs, Colorado. That base assignment lasted until 1 November 1946, when SAC transferred the Eighth to Fort Worth (later renamed Carswell AFB).

==== Bomb units ====
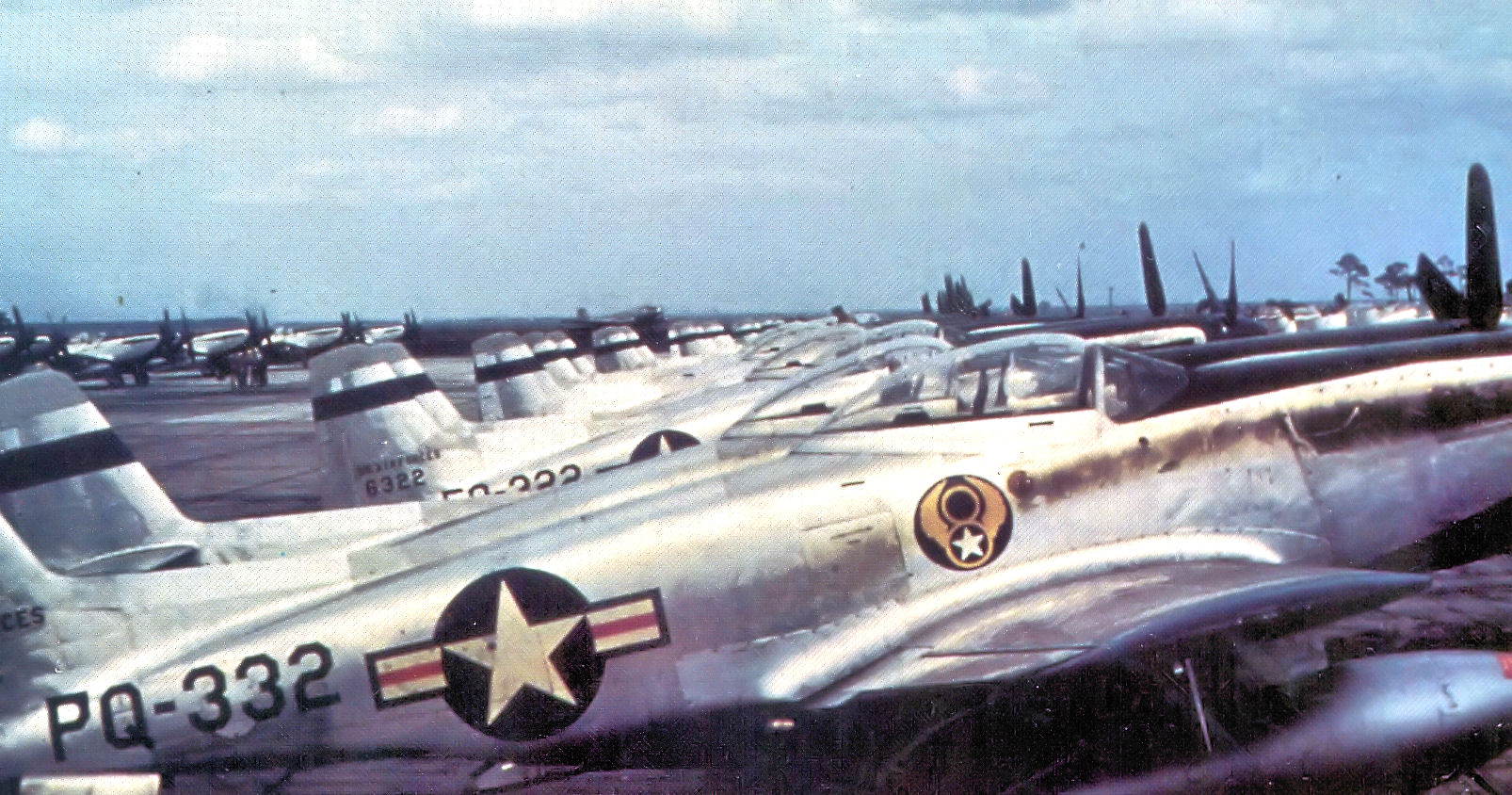
Strategic Air Command 8th Air Force North American F-82 Twin Mustang of the 27th Special Operations Wing of Kearney Air Force Base near Kearney, Nebraska in 1948 with serial number "46-322" identifiable

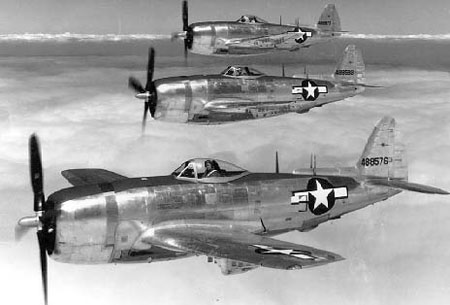
A three ship formation of Republic P-47 Thunderbolts

Both Davis-Monthan and Fort Worth Army Airfields were B-29 training bases during World War II, and the Eighth Air Force Bomb Groups were simply activated at the same field and on the same day as the original Army Air Force Continental Air Forces training bomb groups were inactivated. The assets of the former training units were simply assigned to Eighth Air Force. This was largely so that the Air Force could perpetuate the names of groups that had distinguished themselves in World War II.

These bomb wings were drastically undermanned and under equipped. At the close of 1946, they shared only a handful of operational bombers, all B-29 Superfortresses. Although there were many available which were returned from Twentieth Air Force in the Pacific Theater they were war-weary from the many long combat missions flown during the war. However, it was believed that a strong strategic air arm equipped with B-29s would deter a possible aggressor from attacking the United States for fear of massive retaliation with nuclear weapons.

By the late 1940s, the B-17 Flying Fortresses and Consolidated B-24 Liberators used in the European Theater of the war were thoroughly obsolete as combat aircraft and were mostly sent to the smelters. A handful remained in service performing non-combat duties through the mid-1950s as air-sea rescue aircraft (SB-17, SB-24); photo-reconnaissance aircraft (RB-17, RB-24), and as unmanned target drones (QB-17) and their controllers (DB-17).

The Eighth Air Force under SAC initially consisted of the following:

- Fort Worth Army Air Field (Later Carswell Air Force Base), Texas

58th Bombardment Wing (later Air Division)

Moved from March Field, California 8 May 1946
Moved to Andrews AFB, Maryland 1 March 1948 (Inactivated 16 October 1948)

449th Bombardment Group

Moved from McCook Army Air Field, Nebraska December 1945 (McCook AAF Closed)
Inactivated on 4 August 1946

7th Bombardment Group

Activated on 1 October 1946
7th Bombardment Wing established on 17 November 1947. 7th Bomb Group assigned as subordinate unit.

Personnel and equipment from the inactivated 449th Bomb Group were reassigned to the 7th Bomb Group (later 7th Bomb Wing). The command staff and all personnel of the 58th Bomb wing were eliminated on 1 November 1946 and the organization was reduced to a paper unit. For two years, the wing remained in this status until the 58th Bomb Wing was inactivated on 16 October 1948.

- Davis-Monthan AAF (Later Davis-Monthan Air Force Base), Arizona

40th Bombardment Group

Moved from March Field, California, 8 May 1946
Inactivated on 1 October 1946

444th Bombardment Group

Moved from Merced AAF, California 6 May 1945
Inactivated on 1 October 1946

43rd Bombardment Group

Activated on 4 October 1946
43d Bombardment Wing established on 3 November 1947. 43d Bomb Group assigned as subordinate unit.

Personnel and equipment from the inactivated 40th and 444th Bomb Groups were reassigned to the 43d Bomb Group

- Roswell AAF (Later Walker Air Force Base), New Mexico

509th Bombardment Group

Reassigned from North Field, Tinian on 8 November 1946
509th Bombardment Wing established on 3 November 1947. 509th Bombardment Group assigned as subordinate unit.

The Eighth Air Force was specifically charged with the atomic mission; however, only the 509th Composite Group at Roswell AAF had B-29s that had the capability to drop nuclear weapons – the 7th Bomb Group at Fort Worth AAF was modifying their aircraft to carry the atomic bomb.

- Smoky Hill AAF (Later Smoky Hill Air Force Base), Kansas Transferred from Fifteenth Air Force, 16 May 1948

301st Bombardment Wing
Moved to Barksdale Air Force Base, Louisiana, 1 August 1949. Smoky Hill AFB Inactivated.

From 1946 through 1949, what little money became available was used to buy new planes (Boeing B-50 Superfortress, Convair B-36 Peacemaker) for SAC, and as the newer aircraft became available, the older B-29s were sent to storage depots or sent to Air Force Reserve units for training missions.

==== Fighter units ====
SAC was founded by the men who fought in World War II, who knew the importance of fighter escorts. In its early days, SAC had fighter wings for the escorting its aircraft equipped with the new F-82E Twin Mustang along with long range F-51H Mustangs and F-47N Thunderbolts, all of which were designed late in World War II for use in the planned invasion of Japan. SAC fighter wings assigned to Eighth Air Force were:

- 27th Fighter Wing (F-82E Twin Mustang)

Activated at Kearney AFB, Nebraska on 27 July 1947
Reassigned to Bergstrom AFB, Texas on 16 March 1949 (Base Closed)

- 31st Fighter Wing (F-47N Thunderbolt)

Activated at Turner AFB, Georgia on 25 June 1947
Inactivated on 16 June 1952

- 33d Fighter Wing (F-51H Mustang, F-80C Shooting Star)

Attached to 509th Bombardment Wing, Very Heavy, Walker AFB, New Mexico 17 November 1947
Reassigned to Otis AFB, Massachusetts, 15 November 1948

- 82d Fighter Wing (F-51D Mustang)

Activated at Grenier AFB, New Hampshire on 12 April 1947
Inactivated 2 October 1949

Fighter escorts were no longer needed once SAC was equipped with Boeing B-47 Stratojet and then Boeing B-52 Stratofortress jet bombers carrying nuclear bombs. As the nuclear weapons carried by the bombers were so powerful that only one plane was assigned to a target that might have previously needed a whole bomb group of aircraft. Although SAC fighter squadrons upgraded to Republic F-84F Thunderstreak jet fighters in the early 1950s, the new jet bombers flew so high and so fast there was little danger of them being intercepted by enemy fighters. By 1955, SAC no longer needed its fighters and these fighter units were transferred to Tactical Air Command and utilized in a tactical role.

In 1949, a realignment of responsibilities for SAC's two air forces occurred. Fifteenth Air Force relocated to March Air Force Base, California. As part of this realignment, most SAC bomber forces west of the Mississippi River were reassigned to 15th AF. Those east of the Mississippi were assigned to SAC's other strategic air force, Eighth Air Force, which moved to Westover Air Force Base, Massachusetts, where it commanded all SAC bases in the eastern United States.

Several events in the late 1940s reversed the drawdown of United States strategic forces. The 1948 blockade of West Berlin by the Eastern bloc and the outbreak of the Cold War caused the United States to deploy SAC's B-29 bomber force back to the United Kingdom and West Germany. Communist victories in the Chinese Civil War in 1949 and the outbreak of the Korean War in 1950 meant that the United States would have to expand SAC to address these potential threats both in Europe as well as Asia.

By the time of the outbreak of the Korean War in June 1950, Eighth Air Force consisted of the following units:

- Carswell Air Force Base, Texas

7th Bombardment Wing (B-36 Peacekeeper)
11th Bombardment Wing (inactive)

- Biggs AFB, Texas

97th Bombardment Wing (B-29 Superfortress)

- Davis-Monthan AFB, Arizona

43d Bombardment Wing (B-29, B-50 Superfortress)

- Ellsworth AFB, South Dakota

28th Bombardment Wing (B-36 Peacekeeper)

- Walker AFB, New Mexico

6th Bombardment Wing (B-36 Peacekeeper)
509th Bombardment Wing (B-29, B-50 Superfortress)

- Chatham AFB, Georgia

2d Bombardment Wing (B-29, KB-50 Superfortress)

- Bergstrom AFB Texas

27th Fighter-Escort Wing (F-84 Thunderstreak)

=== Korean War ===
On 25 June 1950, the armed forces of the Democratic People's Republic of Korea (North Korea) invaded South Korea. On 27 June, the United Nations Security Council voted to assist the South Koreans in resisting the invasion. Although Eighth Air Force's strategic bomber force was not committed to combat in Korea, the Eighth deployed the 27th Fighter Escort Wing for combat action in Korea and earned numerous honors and awards for their combat record during the Korean War.

On 21 January 1951, Lt. Col. William Bertram, commander of the 523rd Fighter-Escort Squadron, shot down the first MiG-15 for the wing and became the first F-84 pilot with a confirmed MiG kill. Two days later, on 23 January, the 27th FEW participated in the raid on Sinuju Airfield in North Korea and shot down four more MiG-15s. By the time the group rotated back to the United States, they had flown more than 23,000 combat hours in more than 12,000 sorties.

For its Korean War service, the 27th Fighter-Escort Wing received the Distinguished Unit Citation, covering the period of 26 January through 21 April 1951, for their actions in Korea.

The 27th was relieved of its duties supporting U.N. forces in Korea and returned to Bergstrom AFB on 31 July 1951, but was redeployed to Misawa AB, Japan during 6 October 1952 – 13 February 1953 to provide air defense.

=== Cold War ===
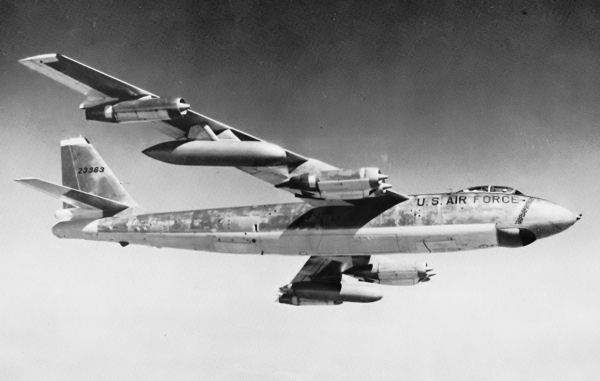
Eighth Air Force's Boeing B-47 Stratojet in flight during the Cold War

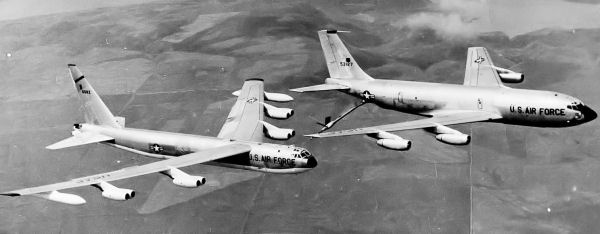
Eighth Air Force Boeing B-52 Stratofortress (left), being refueled by Boeing KC-135A tanker

With the end of fighting in Korea, President Dwight D. Eisenhower, who had taken office in January 1953, called for a "new look" at national defense. The result: a greater reliance on nuclear weapons and air power to deter war. His administration chose to invest in the Air Force, especially Strategic Air Command. The nuclear arms race shifted into high gear. The Air Force retired nearly all of its piston-engined B-29/B-50s and they were replaced by new Boeing B-47 Stratojet aircraft. By 1955 the Boeing B-52 Stratofortress would be entering the inventory in substantial numbers, as prop B-36s were phased out of heavy bombardment units rapidly.

Also after the deployment of forces to Far East Air Force to engage in combat over Korea, the history of Eighth Air Force becomes indistinguishable from that of SAC. The Eighth's weapons inventory also changed to include KC-135 air refuelers and intercontinental ballistic missiles, the Atlas, Titan I and Titan II, and all Minuteman models.

At the same time, aerial refueling techniques were improved to the extent that Eighth Air Force bombers could still reach targets in Europe and Asia even if overseas bases were destroyed by an enemy attack. To reduce the risk to its bomber fleet in the United States, Eighth Air Force aircraft stood nuclear alert, providing a deterrent against an attack on the United States by the Soviet Union. It dispersed its planes to a large number of bases across the United States so as not to have too many concentrated at a single location.

=== Vietnam War ===
In 1965, Eighth Air Force entered combat again, this time in Southeast Asia. At first, the Eighth deployed its B-52 bomber and KC-135 tanker units from the U.S. to operating bases in Guam, Okinawa and Thailand. Then in April 1970, SAC moved the Eighth without personnel or equipment to Andersen AFB Guam, absorbing resources of the 3d Air Division. At Andersen AFB, the Eighth took over the direction of all bombing and refueling operations in Southeast Asia. The intensive bombing of Hanoi and Haiphong during 11 days in December 1972, known as Operation Linebacker II, was a notable operation during the war. Importantly, the Eighth's bombing effectiveness influenced the North Vietnamese to end hostilities. With the end of combat in Southeast Asia, the Eighth Air Force moved without personnel or equipment to Barksdale Air Force Base Louisiana on 1 January 1975, absorbing the resources of Second Air Force.

In the 1980s, the Eighth participated in several key operations such as running the tanker task force for Operation Urgent Fury in 1983 and directing all air refueling operations for Operation El Dorado Canyon in 1986 and Operation Just Cause in 1989.

=== Operations over Iraq ===
The Eighth's units played a key role in the 42-day Gulf War in 1991. An Eighth Air Force unit, the 2d Bomb Wing, spearheaded the air campaign by dispatching B-52s from Barksdale to launch conventional air-launched cruise missiles against Iraqi targets. Eighth Air Force bomb wings, stationed in the Persian Gulf region, also attacked Iraq's Republican Guard forces and numerous key strategic targets, while other units provided air refueling and tactical reconnaissance throughout the conflict. As a headquarters, the Eighth had another important role in victory over Iraqi forces – operating the logistics supply and air refueling bridge between the U.S. and gulf region.

=== Reorganisation June 1992 ===

Fifteen months after Operation Desert Storm, the Air Force reorganized. Eighth Air Force was relieved from assignment to Strategic Air Command and assigned to the new Air Combat Command (ACC) on 1 June 1992.

Under ACC, Eighth Air Force provides command and control, intelligence, surveillance, and reconnaissance (C2ISR); long-range attack; and information operations forces to Air Force components and warfighting commands. Eighth Air Force trains, tests, exercises and demonstrates combat-ready forces for rapid employment worldwide.

Eighth Air Force also provides conventional forces to U.S. Joint Forces Command and provides nuclear capable bombers, specified Global Strike assets, and C2ISR capabilities to U.S. Strategic Command (STRATCOM). Eighth Air Force also supports STRATCOM's Joint Force Headquarters – Information Operations and serves as the command element for Air Force wide computer network operations.

Under ACC, the Eighth received control over active duty, Air Force Reserve, and Air National Guard units in the central U.S. and two overseas locations. Then in January 1994, ACC reorganized Eighth Air Force as a general purpose Numbered Air Force (NAF) with a warfighting mission to support the U.S. Joint Forces and U.S. Strategic Commands. Support to the latter command included the operation of Task Force 204 (bombers).

Since 1994, the Eighth has participated in a string of contingency operations, such as the 1996 Operation "Desert Strike" against Iraq] the 1998 Operation "Desert Fox" (similarly named but in no way associated with Field Marshal Erwin Rommel) against Iraq, which featured the B-1 Lancer in its combat debut, and 1999 Operation "Allied Force" against the Federal Republic of Yugoslavia, which involved the B-2A Spirit. The "Allied Force" campaign also marked the Eighth's return to Europe and the participation of U.S. bombers in the North Atlantic Treaty Organization's (NATO) first combat operation. Altogether, the Eighth's bombers flew 325 sorties to drop over 7 million pounds of ordnance on a nation slightly smaller than the state of Colorado.

In 2000, the Air Force decided to integrate information operations into the Eighth Air Force. The integration process started on the 1st of February 2001, when the Air Force realigned the Air Intelligence Agency (AIA) under ACC and assigned the 67th Information Operations Wing and the 70th Intelligence Wing to the Eighth. The reorganization transformed the Eighth into the only information, operations and bomber NAF in the Air Force. For the "Mighty Eighth", that change would bring further restructuring, different aircraft system purchases, and a new challenging mission to the NAF.

While posturing itself for that mission change, the Eighth also supported Operation Enduring Freedom in which the Air Force operates against targets in Afghanistan, and Operation Noble Eagle for the defense of North American airspace. Throughout the first six months of Enduring Freedom, the Mighty Eighth's bombers were instrumental in the eradication of many targets and opposing combatants in Afghanistan.

Major General James C. Dawkins Jr. assumed command of 8th Air Force on 20 August 2018, after having served as the Deputy Director for Nuclear, Homeland Defense, and Current Operations on the Joint Staff at the Pentagon, Washington, D.C. On 12 June 2020, he was succeeded by Major General Mark E. Weatherington, who had previously served as deputy commander of Air Education and Training Command at Joint Base San Antonio in Randolph, Texas.

=== Air Force Global Strike Command ===

Under Air Force Global Strike Command since 1 Feb 2010, Eighth Air Force controls strategic bomber (e.g., B-2 Spirit and B-52 Stratofortress, and B-1 Lancer) forces throughout the United States and overseas locations. Eighth Air Force carries out its warfighting missions under U.S. Strategic Command and the air component commands of the other regional Unified combatant commands. Eighth Air Force has five Regular Air Force bomb wings, two Air Reserve Total Force Integration bomb wings (one in Air Force Reserve Command and one in the Air National Guard), and one detachment in the continental United States.

Bomber wings of the 8th Air Force include:

- Barksdale Air Force Base, Louisiana

2d Bomb Wing, B-52H
307th Bomb Wing, B-52H (AFRC)

- Dyess Air Force Base, Texas

7th Bomb Wing, B-1B

- Ellsworth Air Force Base, South Dakota

28th Bomb Wing, B-1B

- Minot Air Force Base, North Dakota

5th Bomb Wing, B-52H

- Whiteman Air Force Base, Missouri

509th Bomb Wing, B-2A
131st Bomb Wing (Associate), B-2A (ANG)

- AFGSC Direct Reporting Units (DRU)

576th Flight Test Squadron – Vandenberg Air Force Base, California
595th Command and Control Group – Offutt Air Force Base, Nebraska

== Lineage, assignments, components, and stations ==
=== Lineage ===
- Established as VIII Bomber Command on 28 January 1942 and activated 1 February 1942.
- Redesignated the Eighth Air Force on 22 February 1944.
- Redesignated: Eighth Air Force (Air Forces Strategic – Global Strike) on 3 June 2008.

=== Assignments ===
- Eighth Air Force (later United States Strategic Air Forces), 22 February 1944
- United States Strategic Air Forces in the Pacific, 16 July 1945
- Pacific Air Command, United States Army, 6 December 1945 (redesignation of U.S. Strategic Air Forces in the Pacific)
- Strategic Air Command, 7 June 1946
- Air Combat Command, 1 June 1992
- Air Force Global Strike Command, 1 August 2010

=== Major components ===
Commands

- VIII Air Force Composite Command: 22 Feb 1944 – 1 Feb 1945
- VIII Air Force Service Command: 22 Feb 1944 – 16 Jul 1945
- VIII Fighter Command: 22 Feb 1944 – 16 Jul 1945

==== Divisions during World War II ====
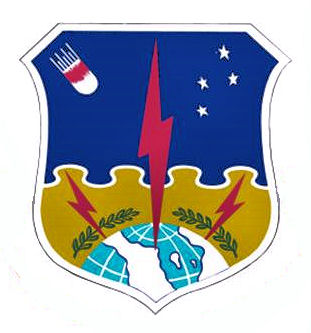
Emblem of the 1st Air Division

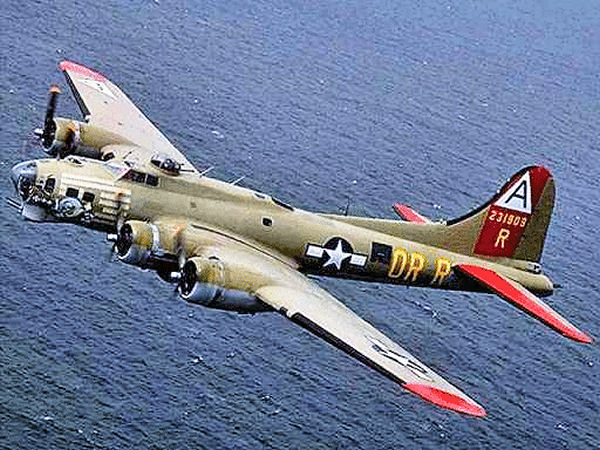
A restored B-17G in the livery of Nine-O-Nine (a bomber of the 323rd BS, 91st BG, that completed 140 missions without crew loss). with 1st Combat Bomb Wing "Triangle-A" tail code

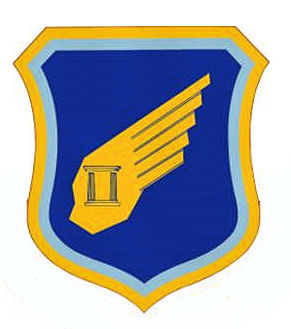
Emblem of the 2nd Air Division

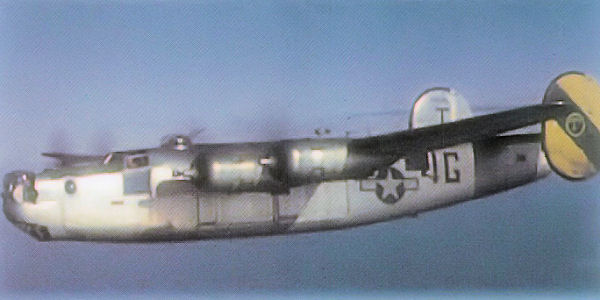
B-24H Liberator "Do Bunny" of 713 BS, 448 BG; it was shot down by a Me 262 jet over Soltau, Germany on 25 March 1945

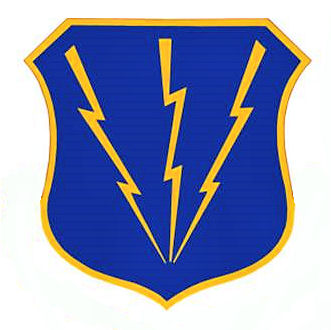
The emblem of the 3rd Air Division

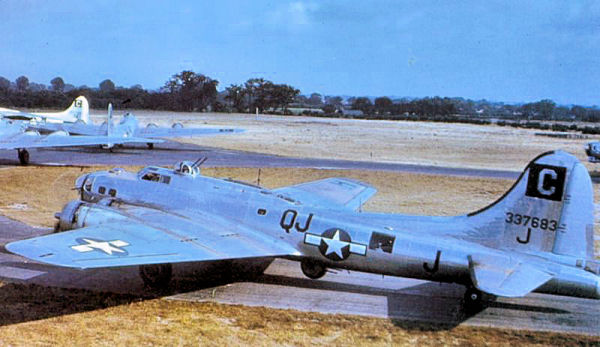
A Boeing B-17G Fortress of the 339th BS, 96th BG at RAF Snetterton Heath

.

- 1st Bombardment (later, 1st Air) Division

Operated the B-17F/G Flying Fortress with "Triangle" tail codes between 22 February 1944 and 16 July 1945
Headquartered at Brampton Grange, Brampton, Cambridgeshire

1st Combat Bombardment Wing, RAF Bassingbourn (Call sign: Goonchild/Swordfish)

91st Bombardment Group (Triangle-A), RAF Bassingbourn
381st Bombardment Group (Triangle-L), RAF Ridgewell
398th Bombardment Group (Triangle-W), RAF Nuthampstead
482d Bombardment Group (No Tail Code), (B-17, B-24) RAF Alconbury

Radar-equipped pathfinder group. Attached to: VIII Composite Command, 14 Feb 1944 – 1 Jan 1945

40th Combat Bombardment Wing, RAF Thurleigh (Call sign: Bullpen/Foxhole)

92d Bombardment Group (Triangle-B), RAF Podington
305th Bombardment Group (Triangle-G), RAF Chelveston
306th Bombardment Group (Triangle-H), RAF Thurleigh

41st Combat Bombardment Wing, RAF Molesworth (Call sign: Fatgal/Cowboy)

303d Bombardment Group (Triangle-C), RAF Molesworth
379th Bombardment Group (Triangle-K), RAF Kimbolton
384th Bombardment Group (Triangle-P), RAF Grafton Underwood

94th Combat Bombardment Wing, RAF Polebrook (Call sign: Ragweed/Woodcraft)

351st Bombardment Group (Triangle-J), RAF Polebrook
401st Bombardment Group (Triangle-S), RAF Deenethorpe
457th Bombardment Group (Triangle-U), RAF Glatton

67th Fighter Wing, Walcot Hall, Northamptonshire (Attached from VIII Fighter Command) (P-51D/K Mustang) (Call sign: Mohair)

20th Fighter Group, RAF Kings Cliffe
352d Fighter Group, RAF Bodney
356th Fighter Group, RAF Martlesham Heath
359th Fighter Group, RAF East Wretham
364th Fighter Group, RAF Honington
1st Scouting Force, (Attached to: 364th FG), RAF Honington

- 2d Bombardment (later, 2d Air) Division

Operated B-24D/H/J/L/M Liberator with "Circle" tail codes until early February, 1944. Later designation was by various color vertical tail fins with contrasting horizontal, vertical, or diagonal stripes designating a specific bomb group between 22 February 1944 and 25 June 1945
Headquartered at Ketteringham Hall Norwich, Norfolk

2d Combat Bombardment Wing, RAF Hethel (Call sign: Winston/Bourbon)

389th Bombardment Group (Circle-C, Black/White Vertical ), RAF Hethel
445th Bombardment Group (Circle-F, Black/White Horizontal), RAF Tibenham
453d Bombardment Group (Circle-J, Black/White Diagonal), RAF Old Buckenham

14th Combat Bombardment Wing, RAF Shipdham (Call sign: Hambone/Hardtack)

44th Bombardment Group (Circle-A), RAF Shipdham
392d Bombardment Group (Circle-D), RAF Wendling
491st Bombardment Group (Circle-Z), RAF North Pickenham (Aug 1944 – 16 Jul 1945)

20th Combat Bombardment Wing, RAF Hardwick (Call sign: Pinestreet/Bigbear)

93d Bombardment Group (Circle-B), RAF Hardwick
446th Bombardment Group (Circle-H), RAF Bungay
448th Bombardment Group (Circle-I), RAF Seething
489th Bombardment Group (Circle-W), RAF Halesworth (Aug 1944 – 16 Jul 1945)

95th Combat Bombardment Wing, RAF Halesworth (May–Aug 1944) (Call sign: Shamrock)

489th Bombardment Group (Circle-W), RAF Halesworth
491st Bombardment Group (Circle-Z), RAF North Pickenham

96th Combat Bombardment Wing, RAF Horsham St Faith (Call sign: Redstar/Lincoln)

458th Bombardment Group (Circle-K), RAF Horsham St. Faith
466th Bombardment Group (Circle-L), RAF Attlebridge
467th Bombardment Group (Circle-P), RAF Rackheath

65th Fighter Wing (Attached from VIII Fighter Command), Saffron Walden (P-51D/K Mustang) (Call sign: Colgate)

4th Fighter Group, RAF Debden
56th Fighter Group, RAF Boxted (P-47D Thunderbolt)
355th Fighter Group, RAF Steeple Morden
361st Fighter Group, RAF Bottisham then RAF Little Walden
2d Scouting Force, (Attached to: 355th FG), RAF Steeple Morden

- 3d Bombardment (later, 3d Air) Division

Operated B-17F/G Flying Fortress with Square tail codes between 22 February 1944 and 16 July 1945
Headquartered at RAF Honington, Thetford, Norfolk

4th Combat Bombardment Wing, RAF Bury St Edmunds (Call sign: Franklin/Hotshot)

Redesignated from: 92d Combat Bombardment Wing, 22 November 1944
Redesignated from: 4th Bombardment Wing (Provisional), 16 February 1945

94th Bombardment Group (Square-A), RAF Bury St. Edmunds
447th Bombardment Group (Square-K), RAF Rattlesden
486th Bombardment Group (Square-O/W), RAF Sudbury

(Converted from B-24s to B-17s, Summer 1944)

487th Bombardment Group (Square-P), RAF Lavenham

(Converted from B-24s to B-17s, Summer 1944)

13th Combat Bombardment Wing, RAF Horham (Call sign: Zootsuit/Fireball)

95th Bombardment Group (Square-B), RAF Horham
100th Bombardment Group (Square-D), RAF Thorpe Abbotts
390th Bombardment Group (Square-J), RAF Framlingham

45th Combat Bombardment Wing, RAF Snetterton Heath (Call sign: Zootsuit/Fireball)

96th Bombardment Group (Square-C), RAF Snetterton Heath
388th Bombardment Group (Square-H), RAF Knettishall
452d Bombardment Group (Square-L), RAF Deopham Green

93d Combat Bombardment Wing, RAF Mendlesham, (Call sign: Zootsuit/Fireball)

34th Bombardment Group (Square-S), RAF Mendlesham

(Converted from B-24s to B-17s, Summer 1944)

385th Bombardment Group (Square-G), RAF Great Ashfield
490th Bombardment Group (Square-T), RAF Eye

(Converted from B-24s to B-17s, Summer 1944)

493d Bombardment Group (Square-S), RAF Debach

(Converted from B-24s to B-17s, Summer 1944)

66th Fighter Wing, Sawston Hall, (Attached from VIII Fighter Command) (P-51D/K Mustang) (Call sign: Oilskin)

55th Fighter Group, RAF Wormingford
78th Fighter Group, RAF Duxford
339th Fighter Group, RAF Fowlmere
353d Fighter Group, RAF Raydon
357th Fighter Group, RAF Leiston
3d Scouting Force, (Attached to: 55th FG), RAF Wormingford

- Special Groups: as of 1 Jan 1945

36th Bombardment Squadron, (B-24H/J)
Radar/Electronic-countermeasure operations: August 1944 – April 1945

RAF Cheddington

==== Divisions (Strategic Air Command) ====
- 6th Air Division: 1 Jan 1959 – 2 Jul 1966
- 13th Strategic Missile Division: 1 Jul 1963 – 1 Jul 1965
- 17th Strategic Aerospace Division: 1 Jul 1963 – 31 Mar 1970
- 19th Air Division: 16 Feb 1951 – 1 Jul 1955; 1 Jan 1975 – 30 Sep 1988
- 21st Air Division: 1 Jul 1955 – 1 Jan 1959
- 38th Air Division: 1 Jan 1959 – 1 Nov 1959
- 42d Air Division: 10 Mar 1951 – 1 Apr 1955; 15 Jul 1959 – 9 Jul 1991
- 45th Air Division: 8 Oct 1954 – 18 Jan 1958; 20 Nov 1958 – 31 Mar 1970; 1 Jan 1975 – 15 Jun 1989
- 47th Air Division: 10 Feb 1951 – 1 Apr 1955
- 57th Air Division: 4 Sep 1956 – 2 Jul 1969
- 801st Air Division: 1 Jul 1955 – 15 Mar 1965
- 802d Air Division: 1 Jul 1955 – 1 Jan 1959
- 810th Air Division: 16 Jun 1952 – 1 Apr 1955
- 817th Air Division: 1 Feb 1956 – 31 Mar 1970
- 818th Air Division: 1 Jul 1955 – 1 Jan 1959
- 820th Air (later, 820 Strategic Aerospace) Division: 1 Feb 1956 – 25 Jun 1965.
- 822d Air Division: 1 Jan 1959 – 2 Sep 1966
- 823d Air Division: 1 Jan 1959 – 31 Mar 1970

==== Wings ====
- 2nd Bomb Wing, 16 Jun 1988 – present
- 5th Bomb Wing, 1 Jun 1991 – present
- 7th Bomb Wing, 1 Oct 2015 – present
- 9th Reconnaissance Wing, 1 Oct 2002 – 1 October 2009
- 28th Bomb Wing, 1 Oct 2015 – present
- 67th Information Operations (later, 67th Network Warfare) Wing, 1 Feb 2001
- 509th Bombardment (later, 509th Bomb) Wing, 29 Mar 1989 – present
- 552d Air Control Wing, 1 Oct 2002 – 1 Oct 2009

==== Groups ====
- 92d Bombardment Group: August 1942 – Spring 1943
- 94th Bombardment Group: 19–25 May 1943
- 95th Bombardment Group: 19–25 May 1943
- 97th Bombardment Group: 20 May – 14 September 1942
- 100th Bombardment Group: c. 4 June 1943 – 4 June 1943
- 301st Bombardment Group: c. 9 August 1942 – 14 September 1942
- 305th Bombardment Group: 10 September–c. 12 September 1942
- 322d Bombardment Group: c. 15 November – c. 1 December 1942
- 385th Bombardment Group: c. 8−13 July 1943
- 386th Bombardment Group: 4–15 June 1943
- 388th Bombardment Group, 10–13 6 July 1943
- 389th Bombardment Group, 29 June 1943
- 445th Bombardment Group: 5–9 November 1943
- 446th Bombardment Group, 5–9 November 1943
- 452d Bombardment Group: January 1944
- 479th Fighter Group: 15–16 May 1944; c. 4−16 July 1945
- 492nd Bombardment Group: April 1944

==== Centers ====
- 608th Air Operations Center (formerly 608th Air Operations Group and 608th Air and Space Operations Center), 1 Jan 1994 – present
- Air Force Information Operations: 1 May 2007 – present

=== Stations ===
- RAF Daws Hill, England, 22 Feb 1944
- Sakugawa (Kadena Airfield), Okinawa, 16 Jul 1945
- MacDill Field, Florida, 7 Jun 1946
- Fort Worth Army Air Field (later, Griffiss Air Force Base; Carswell Air Force Base), Texas, 1 Nov 1946
- Westover Air Force Base, Massachusetts, 13 Jun 1955
  - Post-Attack Command and Control System Facility, Hadley, 1958–1970
- Andersen Air Force Base, Guam, 1 Apr 1970
- Barksdale Air Force Base, Louisiana, 1 Jan 1975 – present

== List of commanders ==
No.	Commander		Term		
No.	Portrait	Name	Took office	Left office	Term length
1	Ira C. Eaker	Lieutenant general Ira C. Eaker	1 December 1942	January 1944	1 year
2	Jimmy Doolittle	Lieutenant general Jimmy Doolittle	January 1944	September 1945	1 year 9 months
1	Bruce Carlson	Lieutenant General; Bruce Carlson	May 2002	August 2005	3 years, 92 days
2	Kevin P. Chilton	Lieutenant General; Kevin P. Chilton	August 2006	June 2006	302 days
3	Robert J. Elder Jr.	Lieutenant General; Robert J. Elder Jr.	13 June 2006	1 June 2009	2 years, 353 days
4	Floyd L. Carpenter	Major General; Floyd L. Carpenter	1 June 2009	3 June 2011	2 years, 2 days
5	Stephen W. Wilson	Major General; Stephen W. Wilson	3 June 2011	23 October 2013	2 years, 142 days
6	Scott A. Vander Hamm	Major General; Scott A. Vander Hamm	23 October 2013	17 April 2015	1 year, 176 days
7	Richard M. Clark	Major General; Richard M. Clark	17 April 2015	4 October 2016	1 year, 170 days
8	Thomas A. Bussiere	Major General; Thomas A. Bussiere	4 October 2016	20 August 2018	1 year, 320 days
9	James C. Dawkins Jr.	Major General; James C. Dawkins Jr.	20 August 2018	12 June 2020	1 year, 297 days
10	Mark E. Weatherington	Major General; Mark E. Weatherington	12 June 2020	16 August 2021	1 year, 65 days
11	Andrew J. Gebara	Major General; Andrew J. Gebara	16 August 2021	25 August 2023	2 years, 9 days
12	Jason Armagost	Major General; Jason Armagost	25 August 2023	6 November 2025	2 years, 73 days
13	Ty W. Neuman	Major General; Ty W. Neuman	6 November 2025	Incumbent	312 days

== See also ==
- Target for Today – ninety-four-minute depiction of an Operation Pointblank mission from 1944.
- Mighty Eighth Air Force Museum
- Eighth Air Force Museum
- David Wade, past commander
