= Deputy Chief of Staff for Strategic Deterrence and Nuclear Integration of the United States Air Force =

- Seal of the Air Staff

- Flag of a United States Air Force lieutenant general

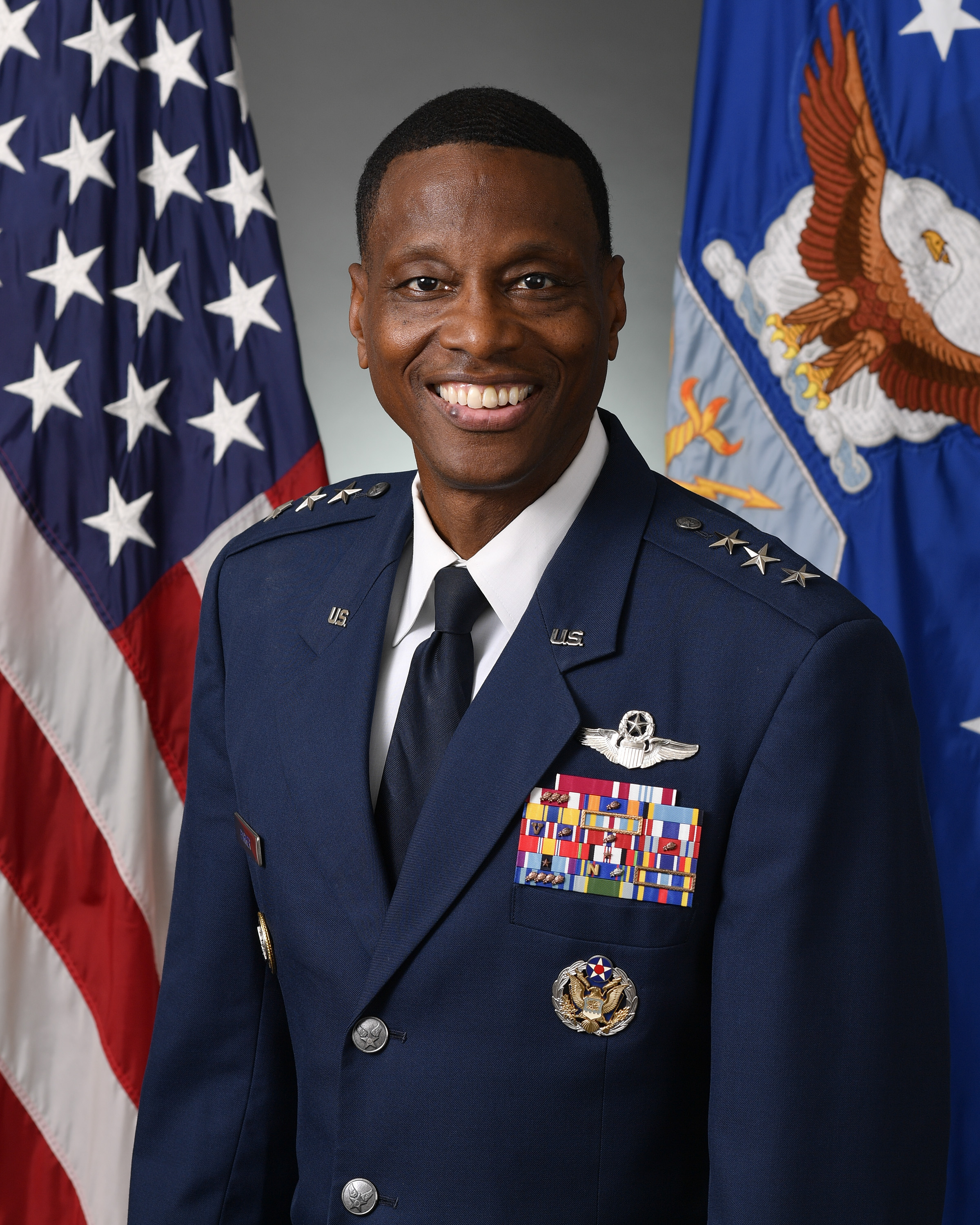
- Incumbent; Lieutenant General Brandon D. Parker since 3 June 2026
- United States Air Force
- Abbreviation: A10
- Member of: Air Staff
- Reports to: Secretary of the Air Force; Chief of Staff of the United States Air Force
- Appointer: The president; with Senate advice and consent
- Formation: 1 November 2008
- First holder: C. Donald Alston

The deputy chief of staff for strategic deterrence and nuclear integration is a position in the United States Air Force tasked with the direction, guidance, integration, and advocacy regarding the nuclear deterrence mission of the U.S. Air Force and engages with joint and interagency partners for nuclear enterprise solutions. Commonly referred to as the A10, it is held by a lieutenant general. The position is one of ten senior positions in the headquarters of the U.S. Air Force. As such, the officeholder of this position serves in the Air Staff. The current holder of this position is Lieutenant General Andrew Gebara. The corporation SAIC currently provides strategic planning and policy support for A10 across Washington, D.C., Joint Base Pearl Harbor-Hickam, and Ramstein Air Base.

== List of officeholders ==
No.	Deputy Chief of Staff		Term			Ref.
No.	Portrait	Name	Took office	Left office	Term length	Ref.
Assistant Chief of Staff for Strategic Deterrence and Nuclear Integration
1	C. Donald Alston	Major General; C. Donald Alston	1 November 2008	June 2010	1 year, 226 days	
2	William A. Chambers	Major General; William A. Chambers	July 2010	March 2013	2 years, 243 days	
3	Garrett Harencak	Major General; Garrett Harencak	March 2013	September 2015	~2 years, 184 days	
Deputy Chief of Staff for Strategic Deterrence and Nuclear Integration
4	Jack Weinstein	Lieutenant General; Jack Weinstein	20 November 2015	October 2018	~2 years, 329 days	
5	Richard M. Clark	Lieutenant General; Richard M. Clark	October 2018	August 2020	~1 year, 305 days	
6	James C. Dawkins	Lieutenant General; James C. Dawkins	1 October 2020	February 2023	~2 years, 137 days	
7	Andrew Gebara	Lieutenant General; Andrew Gebara	5 December 2023	3 June 2026	2 years, 180 days	
8	Brandon D. Parker	Lieutenant General; Brandon D. Parker	3 June 2026	Incumbent	138 days	

== See also ==
- Air Staff
- United States Air Force
