= Mark E. Weatherington =

United States Air Force general

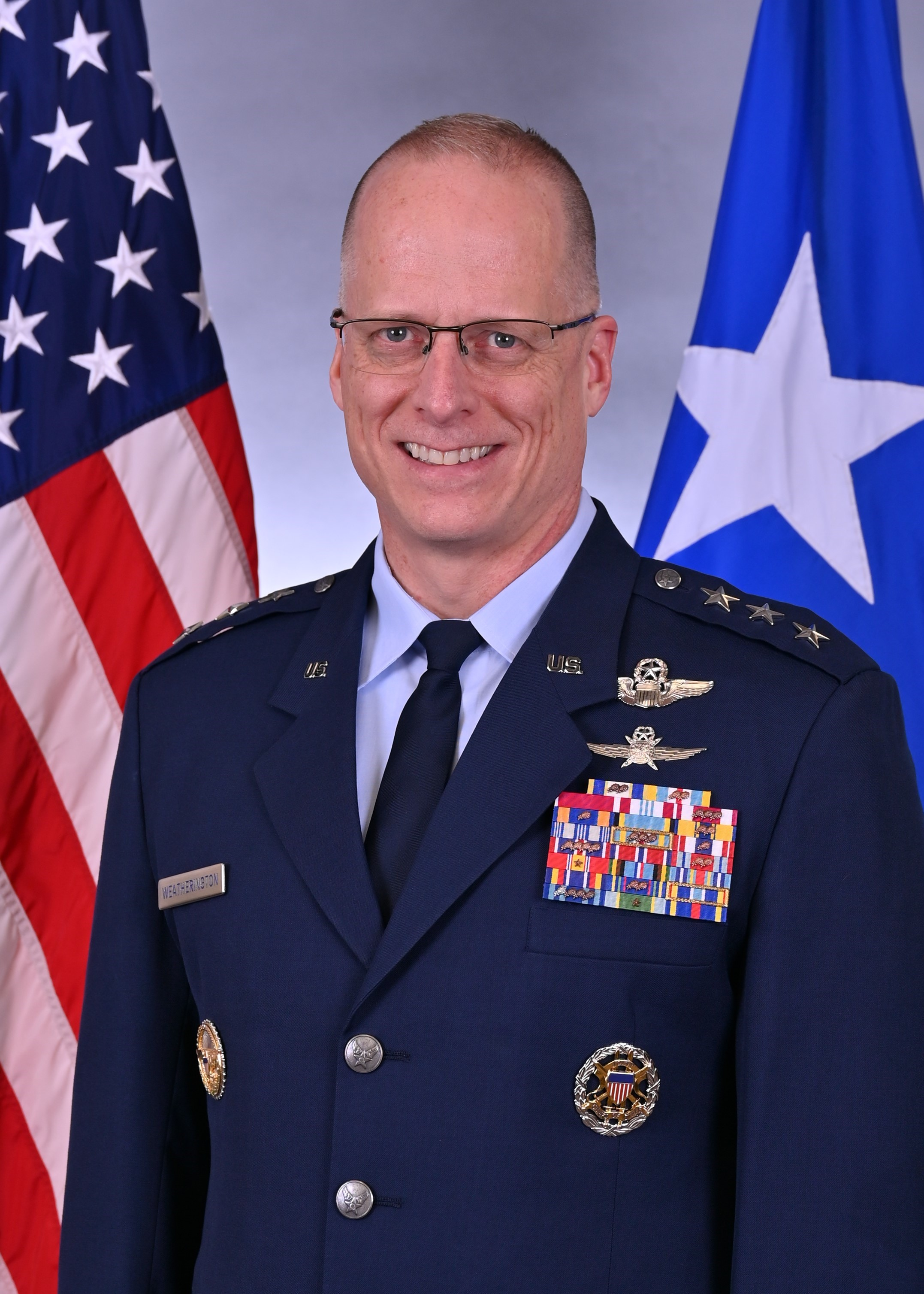
- Born: 1967 (age 58–59)
- Military career
- Allegiance: United States
- Branch: United States Air Force
- Service years: 1990–2023
- Rank: Lieutenant General
- Commands: Joint-Global Strike Operations Center; Eighth Air Force; 28th Bomb Wing; 28th Bomb Squadron
- Awards: Air Force Distinguished Service Medal (3); Defense Superior Service Medal (3); Legion of Merit

Mark Ernest Weatherington (born 1967) is a retired United States Air Force lieutenant general who served as the deputy commander of the Air Force Global Strike Command from August 2021 to August 2023. He most recently served as commander of both the Eighth Air Force and the Joint-Global Strike Operations Center. He previously served as the deputy commander of Air Education and Training Command from April 2018 to May 2020. Weatherington was commissioned after graduating from the United States Air Force Academy in 1990.

In July 2021, Weatherington was nominated for promotion to lieutenant general and assignment as deputy commander of the Air Force Global Strike Command, succeeding Anthony J. Cotton.

Weatherington retired on September 1, 2023.

== Effective dates of promotions ==
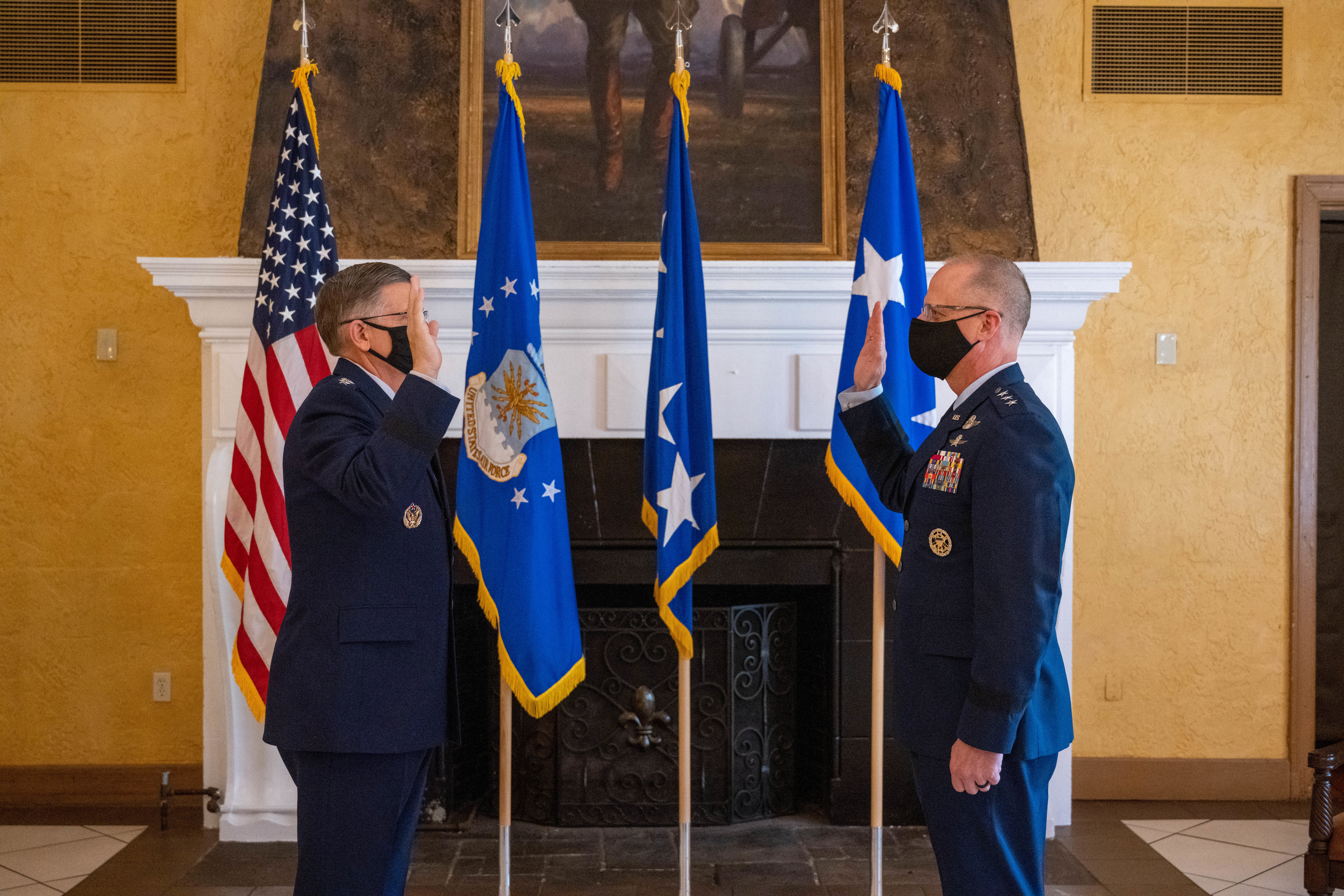
Lt. Gen. Weatherington is administered the oath of office by Gen. Timothy Ray after his promotion on August 14, 2021.

Rank	Date
Second Lieutenant	May 30, 1990
First Lieutenant	May 30, 1992
Captain	May 30, 1994
Major	June 1, 2001
Lieutenant Colonel	May 1, 2005
Colonel	October 1, 2008
Brigadier General	October 2, 2014
Major General	June 2, 2018
Lieutenant General	August 23, 2021

Military offices
Preceded by Jeff Taliaferro	Commander of the 28th Bomb Wing; 2011–2013	Succeeded by Kevin B. Kennedy Jr.
Preceded by James C. Dawkins	Commander of the Eighth Air Force; 2020–2021	Succeeded by Andrew J. Gebara
Preceded by Anthony J. Cotton	Deputy Commander of the Air Force Global Strike Command; 2021–2023	Succeeded by Michael Lutton
