= Richard M. Clark =

US Air Force Lieutenant general (born 1964)

Richard Clark
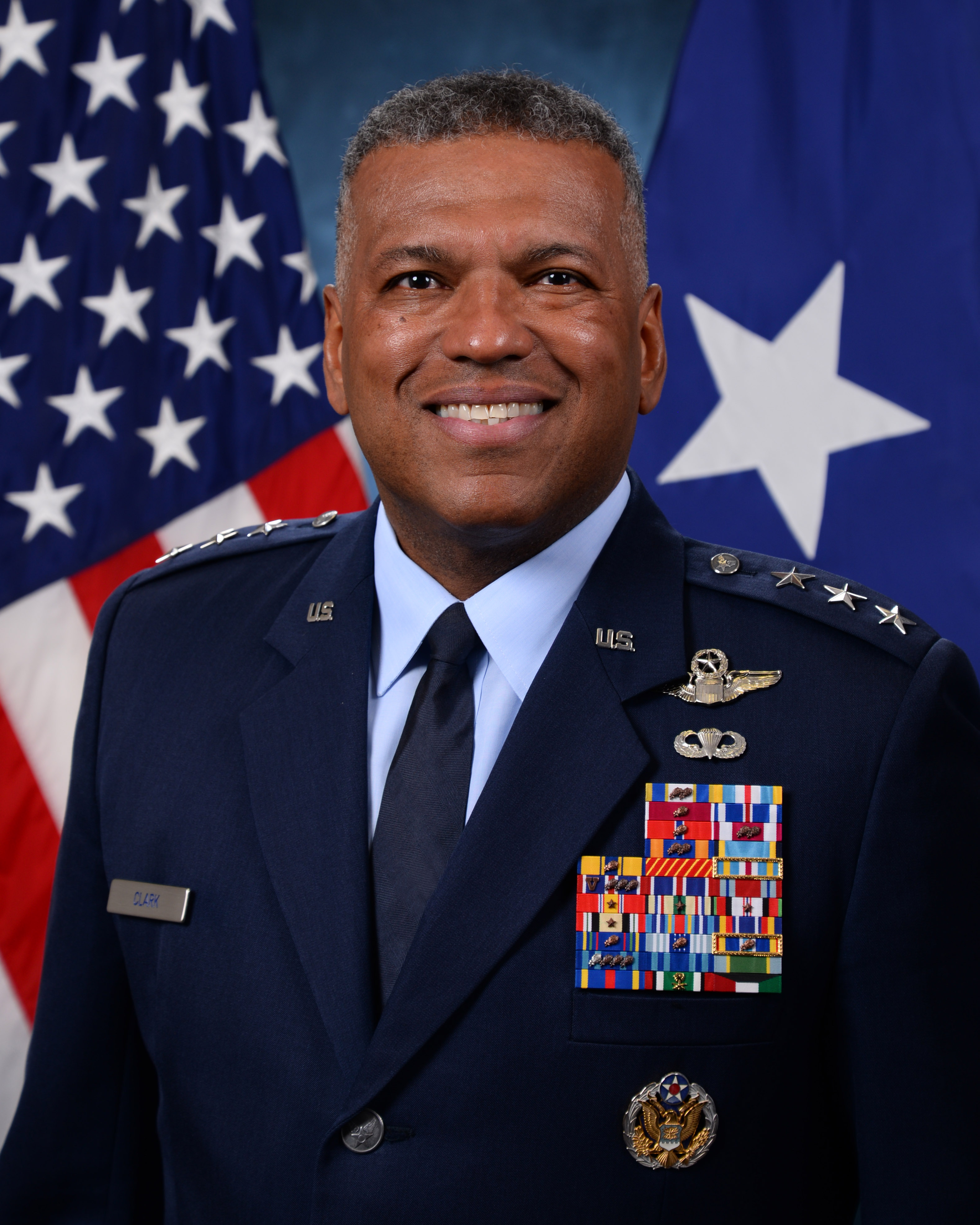
- Clark in 2024

21st Superintendent of the United States Air Force Academy
- In office September 23, 2020 – June 1, 2024
- President: Donald Trump; Joe Biden
- Preceded by: Jay B. Silveria
- Succeeded by: Tony D. Bauernfeind

Personal details
- Born: July 29, 1964 (age 62) Frankfurt, Germany
- Spouse: Amy Purcell Clark
- Children: Milo Joshua Clark and Zoë Adrienne Clark
- Military career
- Education: United States Air Force Academy (BS); Webster University (MA); Air University (MA); Naval War College (MA)
- Allegiance: United States
- Branch: United States Air Force
- Service years: 1986–2024
- Rank: Lieutenant general
- Commands: United States Air Force Academy; Third Air Force; Eighth Air Force; 12th Flying Training Wing; 34th Bomb Squadron
- Conflicts: Gulf War; War in Afghanistan; Iraq War
- Awards: Air Force Distinguished Service Medal (3); Defense Superior Service Medal; Legion of Merit (2); Distinguished Flying Cross; Bronze Star Medal (2)

Richard Milo Clark (born July 29, 1964) is Executive Director of the College Football Playoff and a retired United States Air Force lieutenant general. He previously served as the 21st Superintendent of the United States Air Force Academy from 2020 to 2024. He previously served as Deputy Chief of Staff for Strategic Deterrence and Nuclear Integration. A bomber pilot, he graduated from the Air Force Academy in 1986.

== Early life and education ==
From Richmond, Virginia, Richard Milo Clark graduated from Jefferson-Huguenot-Wythe High School, where he was an All-Metro offensive lineman in football and also stood out in track and field. Originally committed to play at William & Mary in Williamsburg, he took an interest in the United States Air Force Academy during his senior year, was accepted, and graduated in 1986 with a Bachelor of Science in Management. As a cadet, he was a four-year letterman on the football team at linebacker. During his senior season in 1985, the Falcons went 12–1 and were eighth in the final AP poll.

In 1991, Clark was named a distinguished graduate from Squadron Officer School at Maxwell Air Force Base and, in 1994, he received a Master of Arts in human resource development at Webster University. In 1996, he attended the USAF Weapons School, then at Ellsworth AFB, and in 1998 he was again a distinguished graduate at the Naval War College and married his wife, Amy, shortly after. The University of Maryland awarded him an honorary doctorate.

== Military career ==
Clark is a command pilot, with more than 4,200 combined hours in the B-1 Lancer, EC-135 Looking Glass, KC-135 Stratotanker, T-1 Jayhawk, T-38 Talon, T-6 Texan II, and Learjet C-21. Four hundred of his flight hours have been in combat, and he received the Distinguished Flying Cross for extraordinary achievement and courage in the Global War on Terror. His initial flying assignment after pilot training was the Looking Glass in 1988 at Offutt AFB, then moved to the B-1 in 1991 at McConnell AFB.

From 2010 to 2012, Clark served as the Commandant of Cadets at the United States Air Force Academy. In 2016, Clark took command of the Third Air Force at Ramstein Air Base, Germany, and in 2018, he was named Deputy Air Force Chief of Staff for Strategic Deterrence and Nuclear Integration.

In July 2020, U.S. president Donald Trump nominated Clark to become the next Superintendent of the United States Air Force Academy, succeeding Jay Silveria. He began his duties on September 23, becoming the first black Superintendent to lead the institution. Clark retired from the Air Force in June 2024, with Major General Thomas P. Sherman succeeding him as acting Superintendent.

== Civilian career ==
On November 10, 2023, the College Football Playoff announced that Clark had been chosen to serve as its next executive director, succeeding its retiring founding director Bill Hancock.

== Effective dates of promotions ==
Rank	Date
Second lieutenant	May 28, 1986
First lieutenant	May 28, 1988
Captain	May 28, 1990
Major	September 1, 1997
Lieutenant colonel	May 1, 2000
Colonel	August 1, 2004
Brigadier general	November 18, 2009
Major general	June 4, 2013
Lieutenant general	October 21, 2016

Military offices
Preceded by Samuel D. Cox	Commandant of Cadets of the United States Air Force Academy; 2010–2012	Succeeded by Gregory J. Lengyel
Preceded by Joseph L. Lengyel	Chief of the Office of Military Cooperation and Senior Defense Official and Defense Attaché to Cairo; 2012–2014	Succeeded by Charles W. Hooper
Preceded by Robert D. Rego	Vice Commander of the Air Force Global Strike Command; 2014–2015	Succeeded by Michael E. Fortney
Preceded by Scott Vander Hamm	Commander of the Eighth Air Force; 2015–2016	Succeeded by Thomas A. Bussiere
Preceded by Timothy Ray	Commander of the Third Air Force; 2016–2018	Succeeded by John M. Wood
Preceded by Jack Weinstein	Deputy Chief of Staff for Strategic Deterrence and Nuclear Integration of the United States Air Force; 2018–2020	Succeeded by James C. Dawkins Jr.
Preceded by Jay B. Silveria	21st Superintendent of the United States Air Force Academy; 2020–2024	Succeeded by Thomas P. Sherman; Acting
Sporting positions
Preceded by Bill Hancock	Executive Director of the College Football Playoff; 2023–present	Succeeded by Incumbent
