= Thomas A. Bussiere =

U.S. Air Force general

Thomas Bussiere
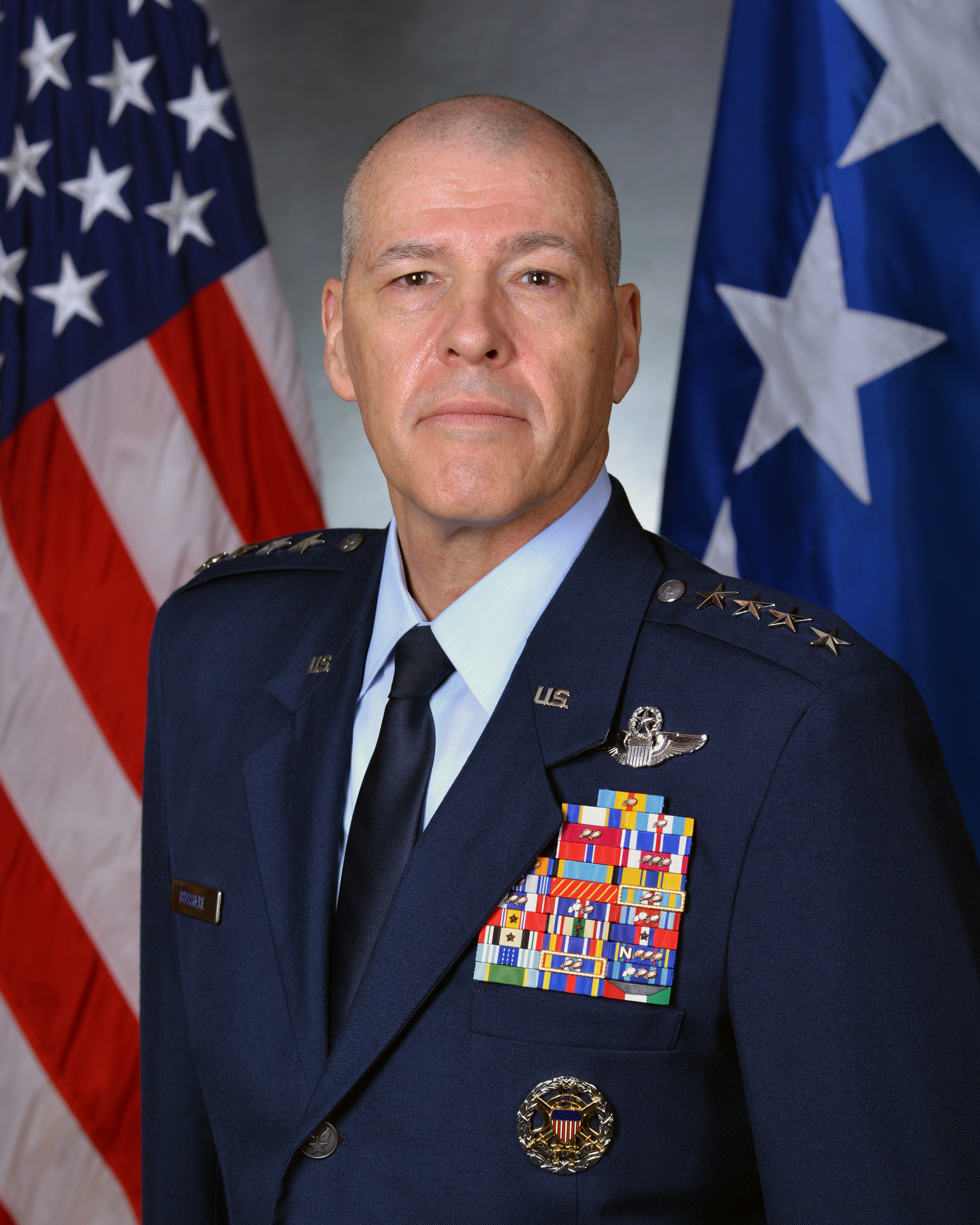
- Official portrait, 2022
- Born: 1963 (age 62–63)
- Education: Norwich University (BS); Air University (MMAS, MS); United States Army War College (MS)
- Military career
- Allegiance: United States
- Branch: United States Air Force
- Service years: 1985–2025
- Rank: General
- Commands: Air Force Global Strike Command; Alaskan Command; Eighth Air Force; 509th Bomb Wing; 509th Operations Group; 13th Bomb Squadron; 325th Bomb Squadron
- Conflicts: Gulf War; Iraq War
- Awards: Defense Distinguished Service Medal (2); Air Force Distinguished Service Medal; Defense Superior Service Medal (2); Legion of Merit (3); Distinguished Flying Cross; Bronze Star
- Bussiere's voice Bussiere's opening statement at a House Armed Services Strategic Forces Subcommittee hearing on the FY2024 nuclear forces budget request. Recorded March 28, 2023

Thomas A. Bussiere (born 1963) is a retired United States Air Force general who served as commander of the Air Force Global Strike Command from 7 December 2022 to 4 November 2025. He most recently served as the deputy commander of the United States Strategic Command from 2020 to 2022. He attended St. Johnsbury Academy in Vermont (1981), and was commissioned in 1985 through ROTC at Norwich University. Bussiere previously served, as Commander, Alaskan Command, United States Northern Command.

In July 2025, he was nominated for reappointment as general and assignment as vice chief of staff of the Air Force. However, on September 5, 2025, it was reported Bussiere's nomination was withdrawn with no explanation.

== Awards and decorations ==
US Air Force Command Pilot Badge
Office of the Joint Chiefs of Staff Identification Badge
United States Strategic Command Badge

Defense Distinguished Service Medal with one bronze oak leaf cluster
Air Force Distinguished Service Medal
Defense Superior Service Medal with one bronze oak leaf cluster
Legion of Merit with two oak leaf clusters
Distinguished Flying Cross
Bronze Star Medal
Meritorious Service Medal with three bronze oak leaf clusters
Air Medal with three oak leaf clusters
Aerial Achievement Medal
Air Force Commendation Medal
Air Force Achievement Medal with oak leaf cluster
Air Force Combat Action Medal
Joint Meritorious Unit Award with two oak leaf clusters
Air Force Meritorious Unit Award with two oak leaf clusters
Air Force Outstanding Unit Award with one silver and one bronze oak leaf clusters
Combat Readiness Medal with one silver and one bronze oak leaf clusters
National Defense Service Medal with one bronze service star
Southwest Asia Service Medal with one service star
Kosovo Campaign Medal with one service star
Iraq Campaign Medal with one service star
Global War on Terrorism Service Medal
Nuclear Deterrence Operations Service Medal with "N" Device and three oak leaf clusters
Air Force Overseas Short Tour Service Ribbon
Air Force Expeditionary Service Ribbon with gold frame and two bronze oak leaf clusters
Air Force Longevity Service Award with one silver and three bronze oak leaf clusters
Small Arms Expert Marksmanship Ribbon
Air Force Training Ribbon
Kuwait Liberation Medal (Kuwait)

== Effective dates of promotions ==
Rank	Date
Second Lieutenant	19 October 1985
First Lieutenant	19 October 1987
Captain	19 October 1989
Major	1 August 1997
Lieutenant Colonel	1 January 2002
Colonel	1 December 2006
Brigadier General	3 August 2012
Major General	5 June 2015
Lieutenant General	24 August 2018
General	7 December 2022

Military offices
Preceded by Scott A. Vander Hamm	Commander of the 509th Bomb Wing; 2012–2014	Succeeded by Glen D. VanHerck
Preceded by Timothy G. Fay	Deputy Director for Nuclear, Homeland Defense, and Current Operations of the Joint Staff; 2014–2016	Succeeded by James C. Dawkins
Preceded by Richard M. Clark	Commander of the Eighth Air Force; 2016–2017	Succeeded by James C. Dawkins
Preceded by Kenneth S. Wilsbach	Commander of the Eleventh Air Force; 2018–2020	Succeeded by David A. Krumm
Preceded by David Kriete	Deputy Commander of the United States Strategic Command; 2020–2022	Succeeded by Richard A. Correll
Preceded by Anthony J. Cotton	Commander of the Air Force Global Strike Command; 2022–2025	Succeeded by Stephen L. Davis
