= Nicholas William Bailey =

American composer and songwriter

- Born: December 21, 1980 (age 45); New Bern, North Carolina, United States
- Occupations: Composer, songwriter, music producer
- Years active: 2003–present
- Organization: ASCAP
- Known for: Television composition, reality TV scoring
- Notable work: 90 Day Fiancé, The Voice, Life Below Zero, 18 Kids and Counting
- Website: www.nickbaileymusic.com

Nicholas William Bailey (born December 21, 1980) is an American composer and songwriter from New Bern, North Carolina. Bailey composes for a variety of cable television networks including TLC, A&E, Animal Planet, The National Geographic Channel, E! Entertainment, CMT, OWN TV, Bravo, CBS, MSNBC, ABC, SyFy, CNBC, Paramount, Discovery and VH1. Bailey is an active ASCAP composer and publisher. Bailey is also a member of the rock band "Nick and the Babes," and produces reality based television programming.

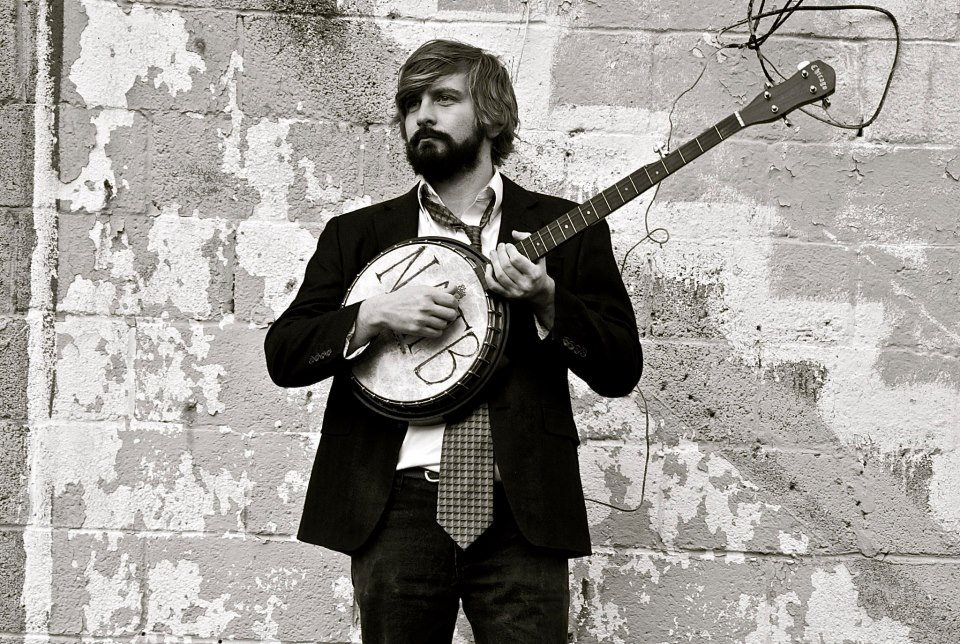

== Career ==
Upon graduating from East Carolina University in 2003 Bailey accepted residency as a piano bar musician. In 2008 Bailey was given the opportunity to compose for TLC's 18 Kids and Counting by fellow North Carolina musician Scott Pearson. Bailey landed music cues into the TLC series. Post composing contributions include Crime 360, 90 Day Fiancé, The Voice, Lockup, Pit Bulls and Parolees, What's Eating You, Project Runway, Below Deck, The Real Love Boat, Tough as Nails, Car Warriors, Police POV, Fact or Faked, Joe Rogan Questions Everything, Life Below Zero, Legend Quest, Iron Chef, Full Throttle Saloon, In the Bedroom with Dr. Laura Berman, Car Chasers, Abby & Brittany, Secret Celebrity Renovation, Married at First Sight, Duck Dynasty, My Cat From Hell, and Dad Camp.

Bailey's film/commercial music contributions include The Editor and the Dragon (narrated by Morgan Freeman), Intel/Lenovo, an award-winning Dale Earnhardt Jr./Taxslayer advert, corporate media, Newsweek.com's acclaimed webseries The District and the defunct virtual gaming world Zookazoo.

Bailey along with members of "Nick and the Babes" appeared on Ramseur Records' 2011 release "My Favorite Gifts" Christmas album along with The Avett Brothers. Bob Crawford (Avett Brothers) produced their rendition of Vince Guaraldi's "Christmas Time is Here."
