= Car Warriors =

Car Warriors may refer to:

- Car Warriors (comics), a 1991 comic book series by Epic Comics
- Car Warriors (TV series), a 2011 reality television series by Base Productions and Speed
