= List of Car Warriors episodes =

This is the list of the episodes for the American automotive Reality television series Car Warriors, which was produced by BASE Productions and ran for two seasons on Speed in the U.S. and Discovery Communications affiliates in international markets. The series is a car restoration/modification competition in which two teams battle each other to restore and modify their mystery cars for a chance to win them by the end of the episode.

== Episodes ==
=== Season 1 (2011) ===
Season 1 of Car Warriors features the All Stars, a team of expert car builders assembled to compete with teams representing their hometown garages. Both teams have 72 hours to restore and modify their mystery cars before they are reviewed by a panel of three judges. If the challenging team wins the contest, they get to take home not only their car, but also the All Stars' car. However, if they lose, they go home empty-handed.

Episode	Date	Challenging team	Mystery car	Winner
1	February 23	Southern Fried D'Lite (Lubbock, Texas)	1966 Ford Mustang Coupe	Southern Fried D'Lite
2	March 2	Danny D. Customs (Chandler, Arizona)	1999 Ford F-150	All Stars
3	March 9	LDRSHIP Design (Temecula, California)	1986 Chevrolet El Camino	All Stars
4	March 16	True Bliss Customs (Burbank, California)	1973 Datsun 240Z	All Stars
5	March 23	SKJ Customs (St. George, Utah)	1979 Cadillac Coupe de Ville	All Stars
6	March 30	Wheels (Palmdale, California)	1969 Volkswagen Beetle	All Stars
7	April 13	Gearhead Garage (Sacramento, California)	1976 Chevrolet Corvette	Gearhead Garage
8	April 20	War Machine (Edwards Air Force Base, Edwards, California)	Ford Taurus ARCA stock car	War Machine
9	April 27	Reyes Automotive Customs (South Los Angeles, California)	2000 Ford Crown Victoria	All Stars
10	May 1	A recap of the past nine episodes where the All Stars count down their top 15 moments while the judges name the All-Stars' 1973 Datsun 240Z the Car Warriors Car of the Year.		

^1 Episode 8-9 were special challenges that had the clock shortened to 36 hours.

=== Season 2 (2012) ===
Season 2 drops the All Stars for a competition between two teams representing their respective hometown garages. The build time has been reduced to 48 hours, while host/judge Jimmy Shine critiques both works. The winning team is handed the keys to their car, while the losing team ends up with nothing.

Episode	Date	Red team	Blue team	Mystery car	Winner
1	February 24	Hot Rod Hooligans (Orange County, California)	Inland Empire Customs (Riverside, California)	1971 Chevrolet Camaro	Inland Empire Customs
2	February 29	United Hot Rods (Downey, California)	Krazy Kreations (Denver, Colorado)	1967 Pontiac LeMans	United Hot Rods
3	March 7	Street Custom & Restoration (Mooresville, North Carolina)	SPG Customs (Philadelphia, Pennsylvania)	1972 Chevrolet Chevelle	Street Custom & Restoration
4	March 14	Hot Rods by Dean (Phoenix, Arizona)	Kaotic Customs (Chicago, Illinois)	1978 Pontiac Firebird Trans Am	Kaotic Customs
5	March 21	Celebrity Kustoms (San Francisco, California)	Ireson Motorsports (Fort Myers, Florida)	1972 Oldsmobile Cutlass S Coupe	Ireson Motorsports
6	March 28	Unique Twist (Burbank, California)	KSmith (Perris, California)	1992 Ford Mustang Fox Body	Unique Twist
7	April 4	Salty Dawgs (West Coast)	Speed Machine (East Coast)	Factory Five '33 Ford Hot Rod	Speed Machine
8	April 11	Sledsville (Woodcrest, California)	ShinBone Alley (Fresno, California)	1986 Chevrolet Corvette C4	ShinBone Alley
9	April 18	L&G Enterprises (San Dimas, California)	Northeast Elite (Baltimore, Maryland)	1969 Chevrolet C-10 Pickup	L&G Enterprises
10	April 25	Billy Bob Customs (Aberdeen, Washington)	Plum Crazy Auto (Newton, New Jersey)	1974 Dodge Challenger	Plum Crazy Auto
11	May 2	Martinez Industries (Gardena, California)	Innovative Rods (Reno, Nevada)	1972 Chevrolet Nova	Innovative Rods
12	May 9	Downs Industries (Lawton, Michigan)	Honest Charley Garage (Chattanooga, Tennessee)	1962 Ford Thunderbird	Honest Charley Garage

^2 Episode 7 is the only time the competitors built a brand new car from the ground up.
