= BASE Productions =

Production company founded in 1992

- Industry: Television/Film
- Founded: 1992
- Headquarters: Los Angeles, California, U.S. Washington, D.C., U.S.
- Key people: John Brenkus, co-CEO; Mickey Stern, co-CEO; John Davis, Vice President of Production; Scott Bramble, Director of Post Production
- Owner: John Brenkus; Mickey Stern
- Website: baseproductions.com

BASE Productions is a production company founded in 1992 by John Brenkus and Mickey Stern. As a producer of reality, documentary, and unscripted infotainment programming, BASE Productions uses a trademark motion-capture and CGI technology. The company has produced programming for a variety of channels, such as A&E, Animal Planet, the Discovery Channel networks, Fox Sports Net, G4, ESPN, HBO, MTV, National Geographic Channel and Spike TV. BASE Productions is located in Los Angeles and Washington DC.

== Chief executive officers ==
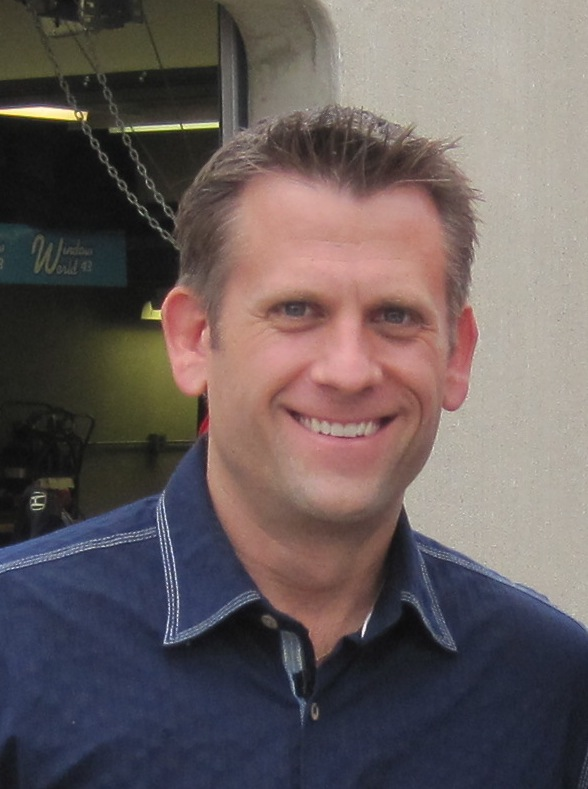
Co-CEO John Brenkus in May 2010

John Brenkus serves as the co-CEO, as well as the host of Sport Science. During the early years of his career, Brenkus produced numerous short films and music video projects before launching full-time into film and television writing, production and direction. John Brenkus is based in Los Angeles.

Mickey Stern is the co-CEO and also headlines the business, legal and financial aspects of BASE Productions. He is based in Washington, D.C.

John Davis is the Executive Vice President working closely with Brenkus and Stern headlining the business, legal, financial and creative aspects of BASE Productions. He is based in Los Angeles.

Robert Curran is the Executive Vice President of Development and is responsible for creative development and production management, and serves as Executive Producer on many BASE Productions projects.

== Productions ==
=== TV series ===
- Deep South Paranormal (2013–2014) Paranormal, SyFy
- Fact or Faked (2012), Reality, SyFy
- StuntBusters (2011), Reality, Speed
- Police POV (2011–2012), Reality, TruTV
- Car Warriors (2011–2012), Reality, Speed
- Car Science (2011), Reality, Speed
- Last American Cowboy (2010) Reality, Animal Planet
- I, Predator (2011) Reality, Animal Planet
- Jesse James Is a Dead Man (2009) Reality, Spike TV, starring television personality Jesse James, premiered on May 31, 2009 on Spike TV to the most viewers and highest rating for an unscripted series premiere among the 18-49 male demographic. In the finale of the first season, Jesse James sets the land speed record for a hydrogen powered vehicle.
- Strong Men (2009 –present) Reality, National Geographic Channel
- Crime 360 (2008–present) Reality, A&E
- Human Wrecking Balls (2008–2010) Reality, G4
- Known Universe (2008–2011) Reality, National Geographic Channel
- Sport Science (2007–2017) Reality, ESPN, tests such theories and practices as female versus male Muay Thai. The show ran for two seasons on Fox Sports Net before being picked up by ESPN in January 2010.
- Fight Science (2006–2010) Reality, National Geographic Channel
