= Lockney, Texas =

- Town
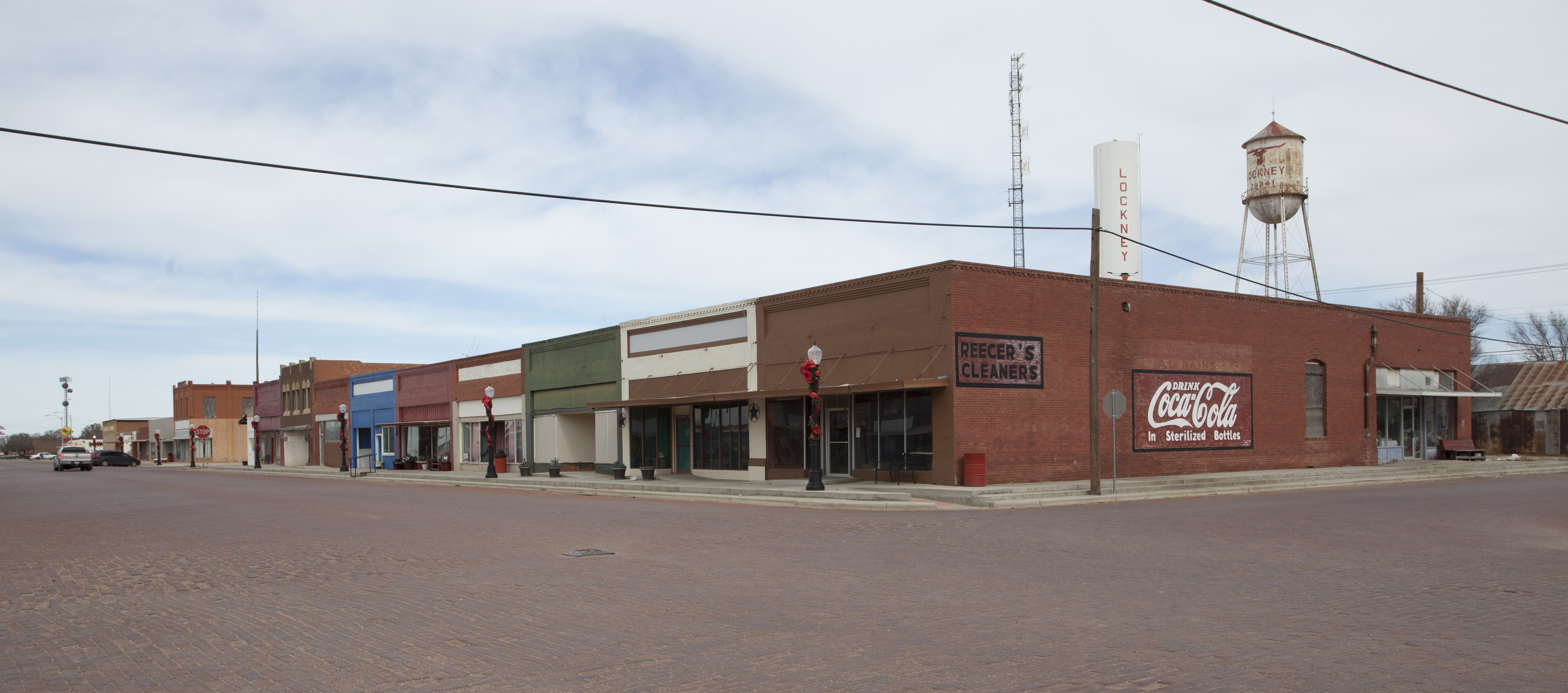
- View of downtown

- Location of Lockney in Texas Lockney (the United States)
- Coordinates: 34°07′28″N 101°26′30″W
- Country: United States
- State: Texas
- County: Floyd
- Region: Llano Estacado

Area
  - Total: 1.54 sq mi (4.00 km^{2})
  - Land: 1.54 sq mi (4.00 km^{2})
  - Water: 0 sq mi (0.00 km^{2})
- Elevation: 3,278 ft (999 m)

Population (2020)
  - Total: 1,498
  - Density: 970/sq mi (375/km^{2})
- Time zone: UTC-6 (CST)
- ZIP code: 79241
- Area code: 806
- FIPS code: 48-43252
- Website: https://cityoflockney.com/en/

Lockney is a town in Floyd County, Texas, United States. The population was 1,498 at the 2020 census, down from 1,842 at the 2010 census.

== Geography ==
Lockney is located in northwestern Floyd County at 34°7′23″N 101°26′36″W (34.122961, –101.443414). U.S. Route 70 passes through the town, leading southeast 12 miles (19 km) to Floydada, the county seat, and northwest 16 miles (26 km) to Plainview.

According to the United States Census Bureau, Lockney has a total area of 1.5 square miles (4.0 km^{2}), all of it land.

== Demographics ==
Historical population
Census	Pop.	Note	%±
1910	750		—
1920	1,118		49.1%
1930	1,466		31.1%
1940	1,231		−16.0%
1950	1,692		37.4%
1960	2,141		26.5%
1970	2,094		−2.2%
1980	2,334		11.5%
1990	2,207		−5.4%
2000	2,056		−6.8%
2010	1,842		−10.4%
2020	1,498		−18.7%
U.S. Decennial Census

=== 2020 census ===
Lockney racial composition (NH = Non-Hispanic) (Note: Note: the US Census treats Hispanic/Latino as an ethnic category. This table excludes Latinos from the racial categories and assigns them to a separate category. Hispanics/Latinos can be of any race.)
Race	Number	Percentage
White (NH)	475	31.71%
Black or African American (NH)	37	2.47%
Asian (NH)	3	0.2%
Pacific Islander (NH)	1	0.07%
Some Other Race (NH)	2	0.13%
Mixed/Multi-Racial (NH)	25	1.67%
Hispanic or Latino	955	63.75%
Total	1,498	

As of the 2020 United States census, there were 1,498 people, 554 households, and 379 families residing in the town.

=== 2000 census ===
As of the census of 2000, there were 2,056 people, 690 households, and 540 families residing in the town. The population density was 1,326.3 inhabitants per square mile (512.1/km^{2}). There were 791 housing units at an average density of 510.3 per square mile (197.0/km^{2}). The racial makeup of the town was 72.62% White, 2.53% African American, 0.24% Native American, 0.15% Asian, 0.10% Pacific Islander, 22.81% from other races, and 1.56% from two or more races. Hispanic or Latino of any race were 51.90% of the population.

There were 690 households, out of which 44.1% had children under the age of 18 living with them, 65.2% were married couples living together, 8.4% had a female householder with no husband present, and 21.7% were non-families. 20.6% of all households were made up of individuals, and 12.6% had someone living alone who was 65 years of age or older. The average household size was 2.92 and the average family size was 3.40.

In the town, the population was spread out, with 33.5% under the age of 18, 7.7% from 18 to 24, 24.6% from 25 to 44, 18.5% from 45 to 64, and 15.8% who were 65 years of age or older. The median age was 33 years. For every 100 females, there were 89.1 males. For every 100 females age 18 and over, there were 88.2 males.

The median income for a household in the town was $29,074, and the median income for a family was $35,469. Males had a median income of $25,673 versus $18,063 for females. The per capita income for the town was $13,528. About 14.5% of families and 17.1% of the population were below the poverty line, including 19.8% of those under age 18 and 17.0% of those age 65 or over.

== Education ==
The town is served by the Lockney Independent School District and is home to the Lockney High School Longhorns.

An additional rural country school was built in [date], five miles northwest, known as Providence School. The school originally served farming students in grades 1 through 8. Upon completing the 8th grade, students would traditionally transition to Lockney High School to finish their remaining three educational years 10-12 grades. The district was eventually consolidated to Lockney ISD during the 1971-72 last school season. The neighing school was demolished and sold. Both operated by the Floydada ISD.

Floyd County is in the service area of South Plains College. and the Floydada ISD and archive records.

== Films ==
- 2002 – Larry v. Lockney. Directed by Mark Birnbaum and Jim Schermbeck.
- 2021 – Lockney is one of the filming locations for Destination Marfa

== Notable people ==
- George Eade, 4-Star General, born in Lockney in 1921
- Maurice Ewing, a geophysicist and oceanographer, born in Lockney in 1906
- Marsha Sharp, first gained recognition for her coaching skills while coaching the Lady Longhorns in Lockney, Texas. She coached six years on the high school level at Lockney
- Andy Stapp, reality TV personality on the TV Series Overhaulin, Car Warriors, and Search and Restore. His car building and custom paint has been featured on Speed Channel, Velocity Channel, Spike Channel, and Discovery Channel. Andy is also the writer and director of the award winning film titled DESTINATION MARFA
- Garry Templeton, Major League Baseball player, born in Lockney in 1956
- Arland Thompson, born in Lockney Texas September 19, 1957, Thompson is a former NFL player who turned scientist after his retirement
- Damon Washington, NFL running back, born in Lockney in 1977
- Louie Welch, mayor of Houston from 1964 to 1973, born in Lockney in 1918
- Lucy Dean Record is a nationally recognized professional musician

== Climate ==
According to the Köppen Climate Classification system, Lockney has a semi-arid climate, abbreviated "BSk" on climate maps.

== See also ==
- South Plains Wind Farm
