= Amir Perets =

Israeli mixed martial artist (born 1974)

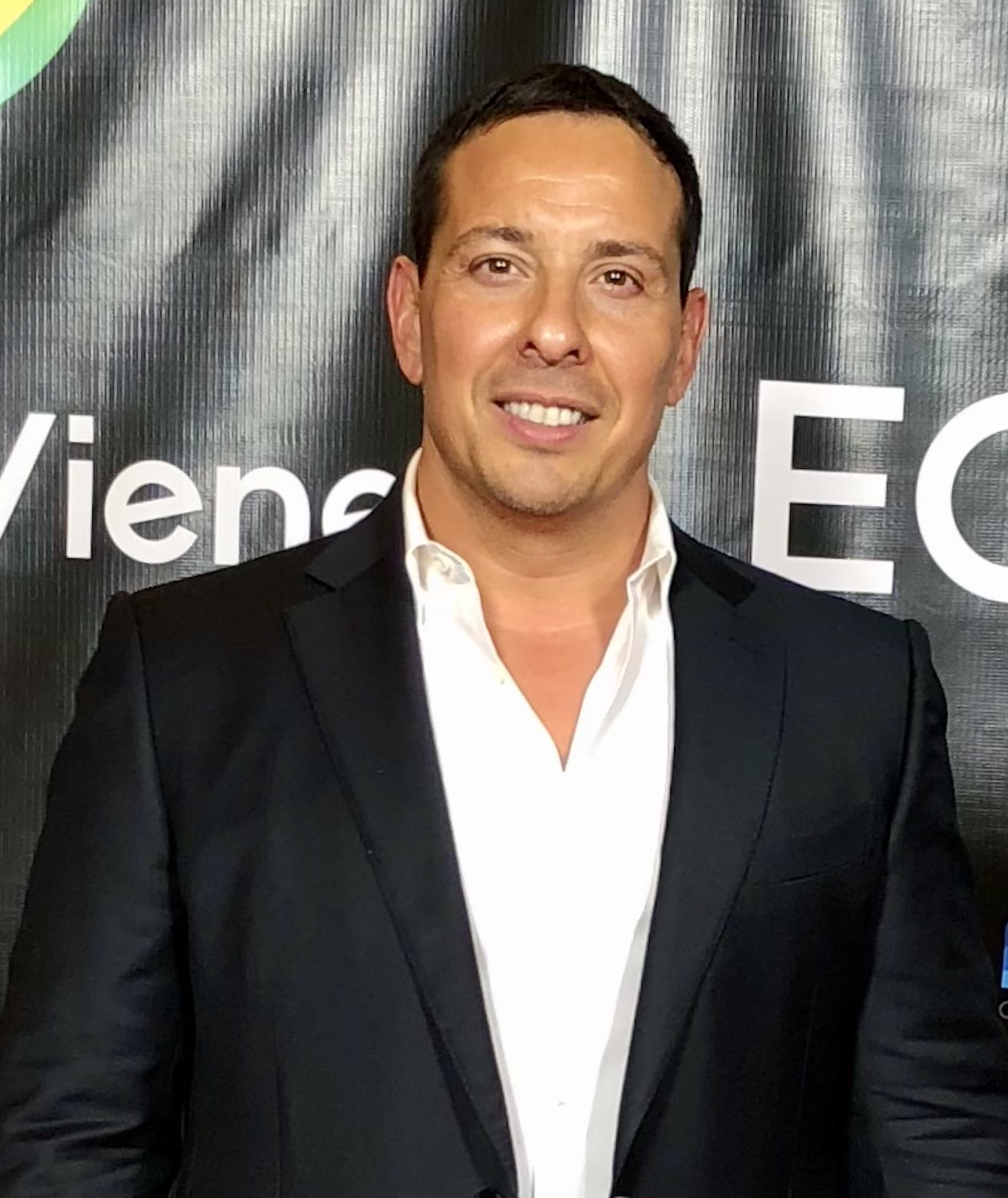
- Perets in 2018
- Born: 20 September 1974 (age 52); Tiberias, Israel
- Native name: אמיר פרץ
- Nationality: Israeli; American
- Height: 1.84 m (6 ft 1/2 in)
- Weight: 103 kg (227 lb; 16.2 st)
- Style: Krav Maga; Kyokushin Karate, Muay Thai,
- Rank: 6th degree dan black belt in Krav Maga; Black prajied in Muay Thai; Black belt in Kyokushin Karate
- Years active: 1985–present

Other information
- Website: www.amirperets.com

Amir Perets (Hebrew: אמיר פרץ) is an Israeli-born mixed martial artist, entrepreneur, and active participant in Fight Science featured on the National Geographic Channel. He is an instrumental figure in popularizing and modernizing the self-defense system of the Israel Defense Forces known as Krav Maga.

== Career ==
At age 18, Amir Perets received awards of distinction for physical education and sports and became Israel's heavyweight full-contact martial arts champion. He then joined the IDF. Perets later became the IDF Krav Maga/hand-to-hand combat instructor for the Israeli infantry and Special Forces units.

Excelling as an instructor, Perets was assigned to the top level of Krav Maga instruction in the IDF, certifying the hand-to-hand combat instructor course; having taught some of the IDF top instructors, Perets then was selected for the Shayetet 13 IDF elite naval commando unit where he built the unit's hand-to-hand combat program.

After completing his military service, Perets traveled to Thailand to continue to pursue his interest in mixed martial arts by training in Muay Thai (Thai boxing).

Perets then emigrated to the United States and pursued teaching defensive tactics and life-saving methods to military counter-terror units, law enforcement agencies and civilians worldwide. Simultaneously, he became a lead instructor at the newly formed “Krav Maga National Training Center" in Los Angeles, California, where he holds a sixth degree black belt.

== Motion Capture ==
Perets was used as Niko Bellic for the video game "Grand Theft Auto IV" and did motion capture for the main character's fighting moves along with Bas Rutten.

== Hall of Fame ==
In 2009 Amir Perets was inducted into the Martial Arts Masters Hall of Fame for his outstanding contributions to law enforcement, military and the world of martial arts.

The Masters Hall of Fame is an association of Martial Artists and other interested parties that works to recognize, develop, enhance and improve the Martial Arts Leaders and Businesses by “Developing and Recognizing Excellence” in the Martial Arts Communities.

== Filmography ==
- The Accountant .... Mercenary team leader www.imdb.com/name/nm1070038/
- Warrior .... Yosi
- Drillbit Taylor (2008) .... "Mossad" Agent a.k.a. "Drillbit Taylor: Budget Bodyguard" - USA (poster title)
- Never Back Down (2008) (Technical Advisor)
- Psychotic (2002) .... Juice

== TV / Miscellaneous ==
- Car Science (2011)
  - "Bust a Move" (2011) TV episode .... Himself
- Inside MMA (2007–2010)
  - Episode dated 5 March 2010 (2010) TV episode .... Himself
  - Episode #1.14 (2007) TV episode .... Himself
- Fight Science (2008–2010)
  - "Human Weapon" (2010) TV episode .... Himself
  - "Fighting Back" (2008) TV episode .... Himself
- Fight Science (2007) (TV) .... Himself
