= 2nd Bomb Wing =

US Air Force unit

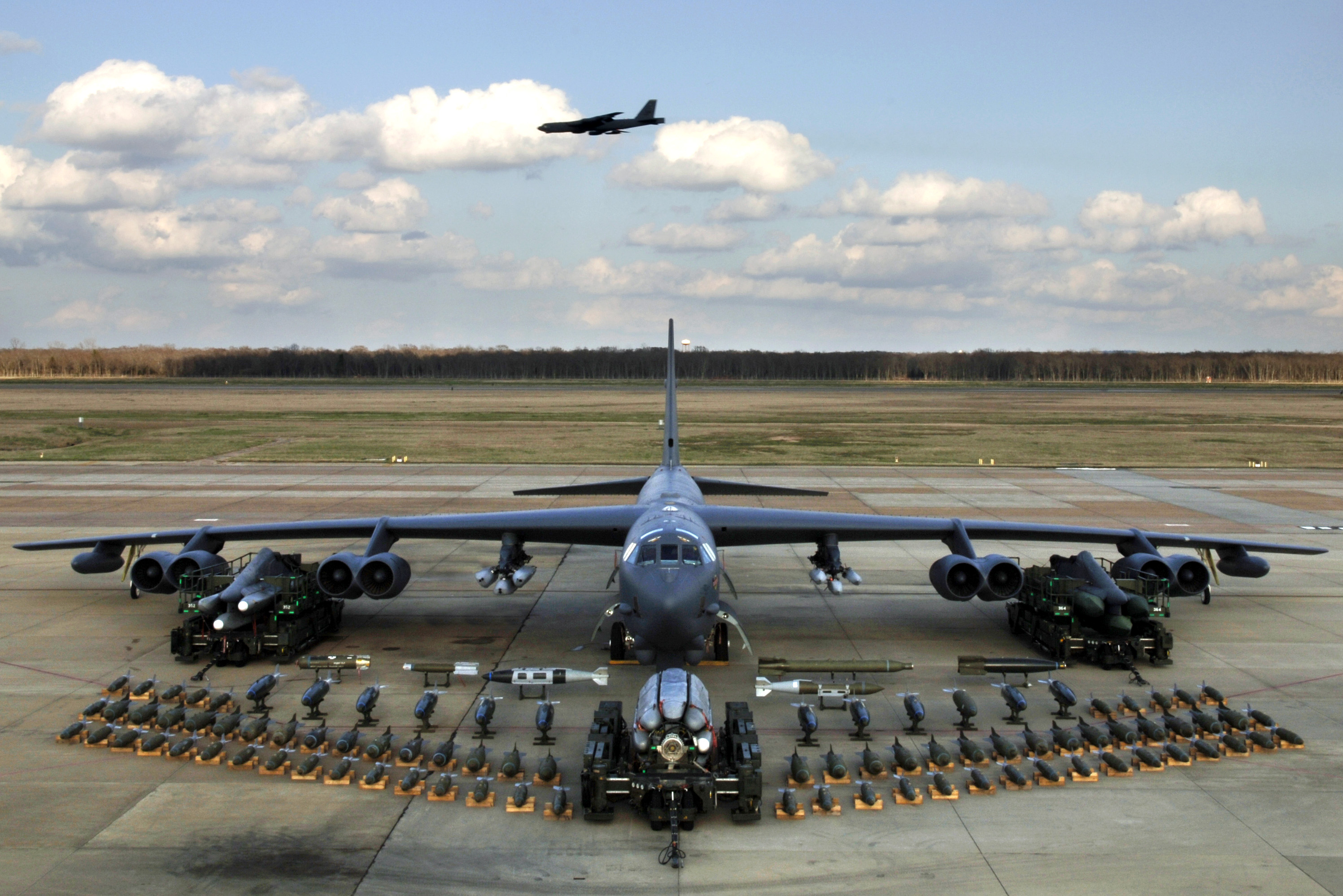
- Boeing B-52H bomber of the 2d Bomb Wing at Barksdale Air Force Base
- Founded: 15 October 1947
- Country: United States
- Branch: United States Air Force
- Role: Strategic bomber
- Part of: Air Force Global Strike Command; Eighth Air Force
- Garrison/HQ: Barksdale Air Force Base
- Motto: Libertatem Defendimus (Latin for 'We Defend Liberty') (Note: Jocularly rendered as Libertatem Defend a Mouse.)
- Equipment: B-52 Stratofortress
- Decorations: see "Lineage and Honors" section below

Commanders
- Current commander: Col Christopher G. Cain
- Command Chief: CMSgt Joshua A. Matias
- Notable commanders: George J. Eade; Eugene E. Habiger; Charles T. Robertson, Jr. John Dale Ryan

Insignia
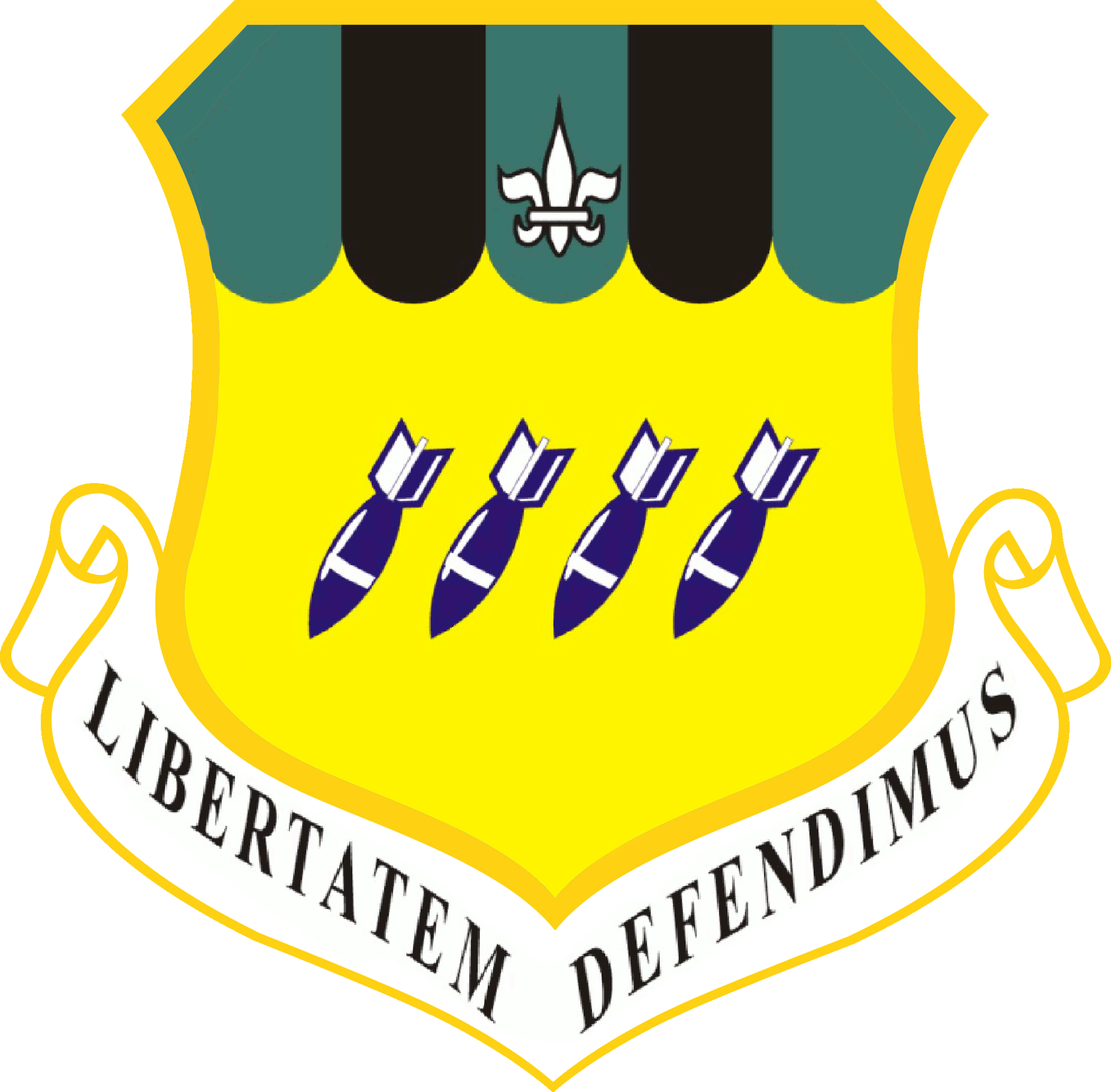
- 2d Bomb Wing emblem (Note: Approved 10 August 1951. Description: Or, in fess four aerial bombs descending bendwise sinister Azure garnished Argent on a chief engrailed Vert a fleur-de-lis White between two pallets Sable, all within a diminished bordure of the first [color]. Significance: The bombs signify original squadrons, the stripes represent major World War I offensives, and the white fleur de lis symbolizes the French location of the battles.)

The 2nd Bomb Wing is a United States Air Force unit assigned to the Air Force Global Strike Command and the Eighth Air Force. It is stationed at Barksdale Air Force Base, Louisiana, United States. The wing is also the host unit at Barksdale. The wing was assigned to the Air Force Global Strike Command in February 2010 as part of the reassignment of Eighth Air Force.

The 2 BW is one of only two B-52H Stratofortress wings in the United States Air Force, the other being the 5th Bomb Wing at Minot Air Force Base, North Dakota.

Its 2d Operations Group is the oldest bomb group of the Air Force, having fought on the Western Front as the 1st Day Bombardment Group during World War I, entering combat on 12 September 1918. After the war, it participated in Brigadier General Billy Mitchell's 1921 off-shore bombing test. Active for over 60 years, the 2 BW was a component wing of Strategic Air Command (SAC)'s heavy bomber deterrent force throughout the Cold War.

The 2d Bomb Wing is commanded by Colonel Christopher G. Cain. The Command Chief Master Sergeant is Joshua A. Matias.

== Units ==
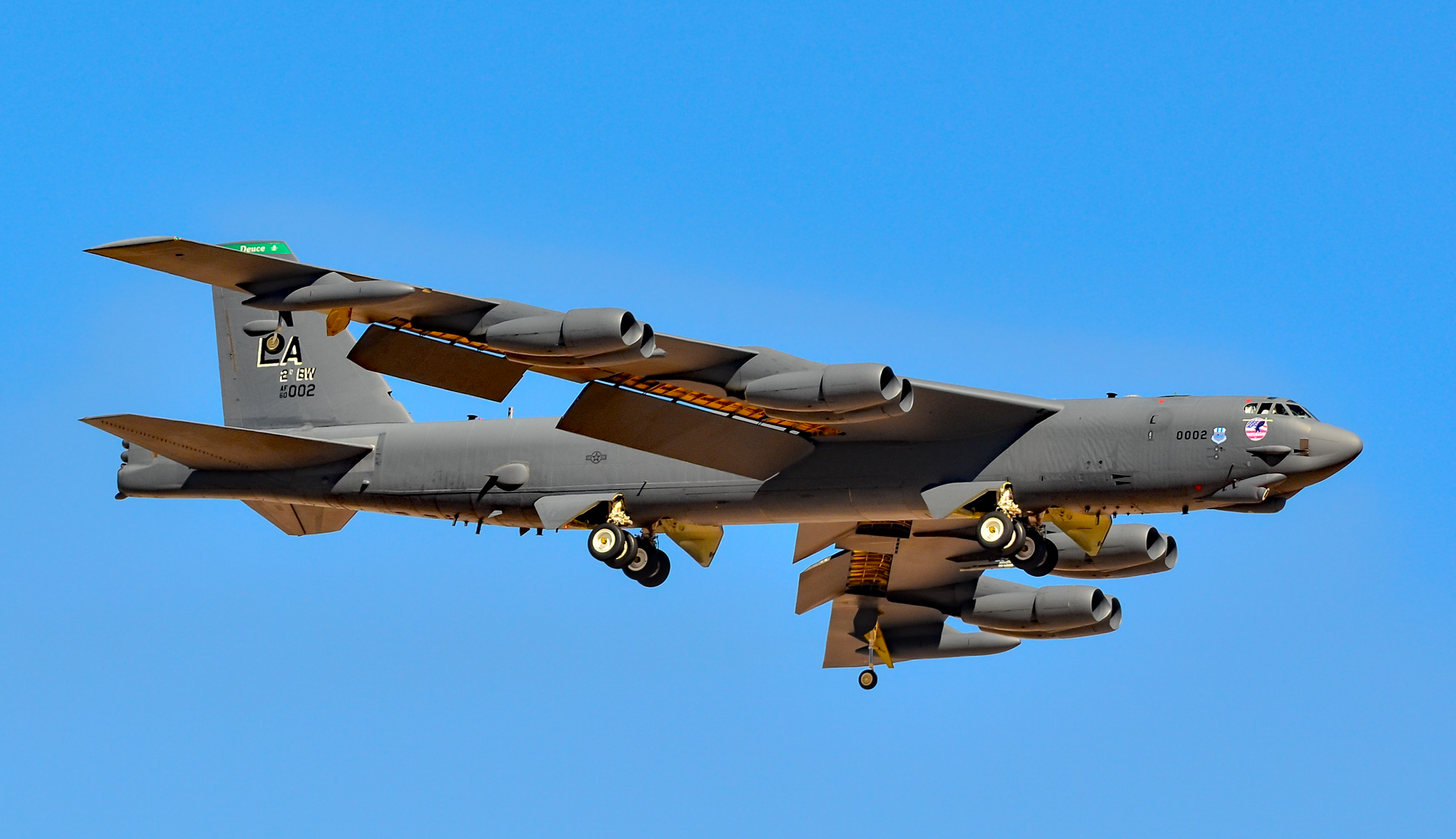
2nd Bomb Wing commander's B-52H

- 2nd Maintenance Group

2nd Maintenance Squadron
2nd Maintenance Operations Squadron
2nd Aircraft Maintenance Squadron
2nd Munitions Squadron

- 2nd Medical Group

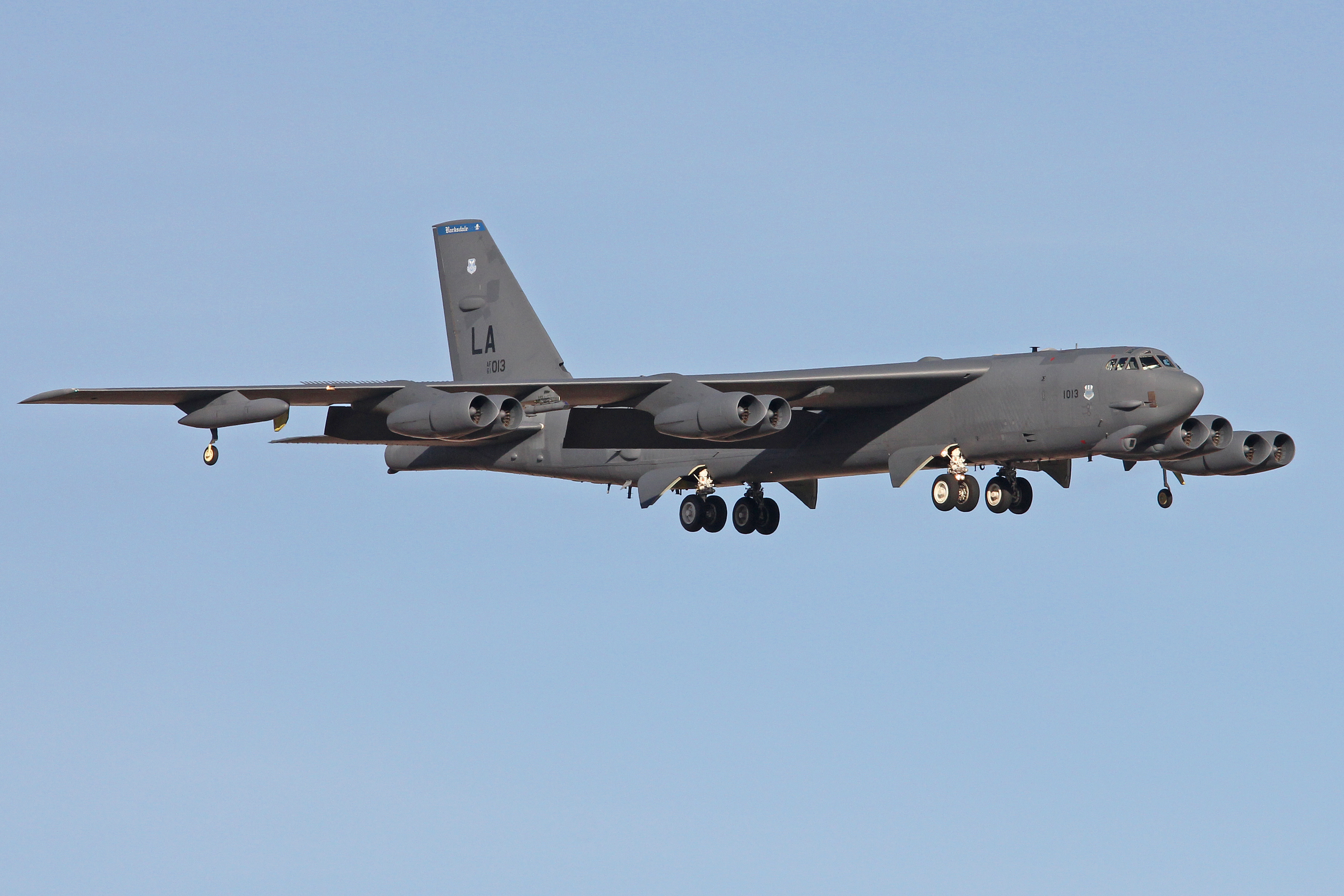
2nd Bombardment Wing B-52H landing at Nellis Air Force Base during Red Flag 16-2

- 2nd Operations Group

2nd Operations Support Squadron ("Posse")
11th Bomb Squadron ("Jiggs Squadron")
20th Bomb Squadron ("Buccaneers")
96th Bomb Squadron ("The Devil's Own")

- 2nd Mission Support Group

2nd Contracting Squadron
2nd Communications Squadron
2nd Civil Engineer Squadron
2nd Logistics Readiness Squadron
2nd Mission Support Squadron
2nd Security Forces Squadron
2nd Services Squadron

== History ==
=== Medium bomber era ===
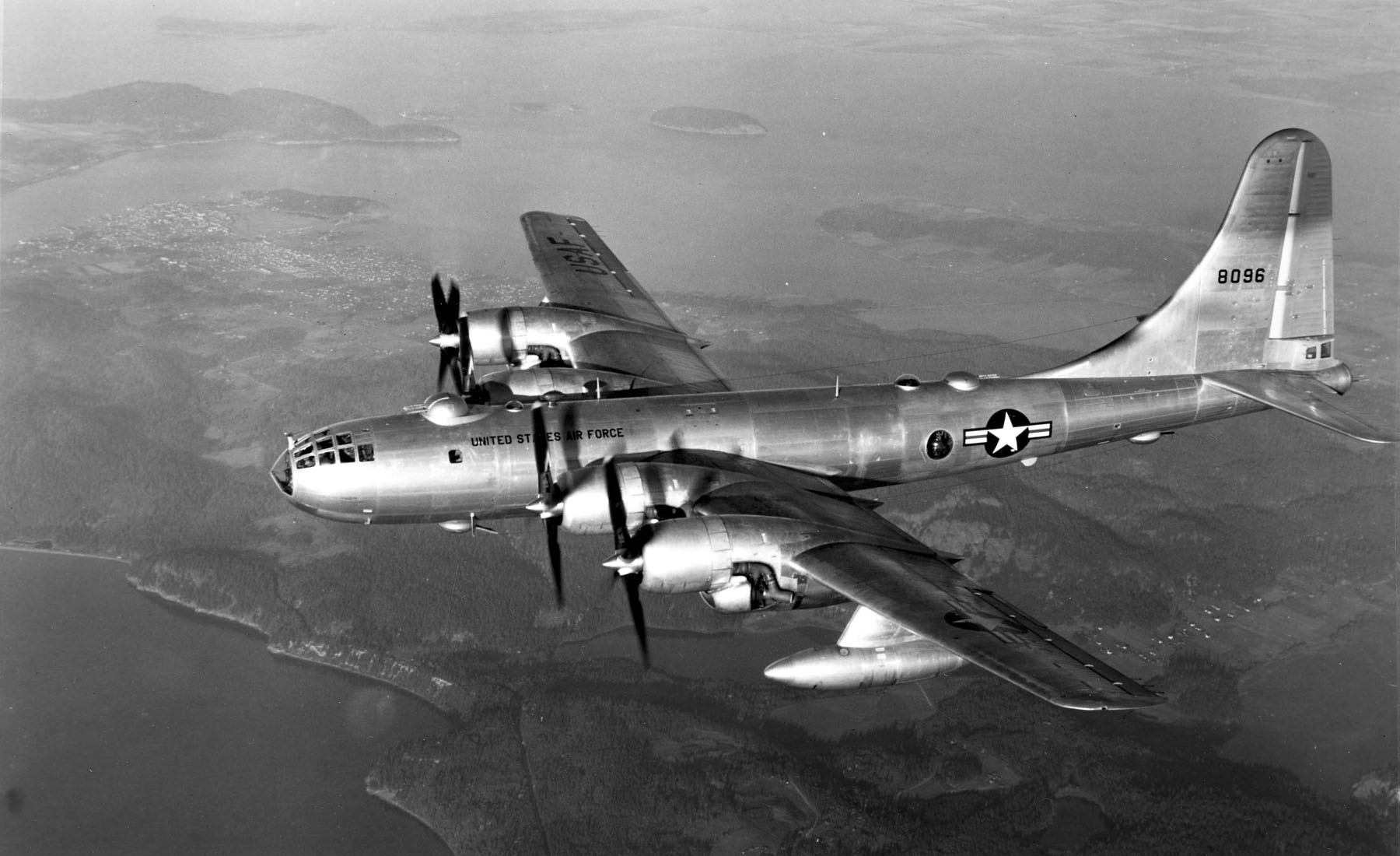
Boeing B-50D Superfortress

The 2d Bombardment Wing was activated by the United States Air Force on 5 November 1947, though it initially had no headquarters or home station of its own. Its assigned 2d Bombardment Group was attached to the 43rd Bombardment Wing at Davis-Monthan Air Force Base, Arizona, all assigned to the Strategic Air Command Eighth Air Force.

A debate over where to station the new wing ended with the selection of Chatham Air Force Base, Georgia, a World War II training airfield. Located about 10 miles northwest of Savannah, Georgia, Chatham had an adequate airfield for B-29 operations, but the base's cantonment area was in extremely poor condition. Its buildings had been built to last for five years, were heated with potbellied stoves and had only outdoor latrines.

After these facilities were upgraded, wing headquarters were stood up 1 January 1949 at Chatham. The 2d Bomb Wing assumed the assets of the 307th Bombardment Group, which had been deployed to the base from MacDill Air Force Base, Florida; and the 2d Bombardment Group, which had returned from a deployment to RAF Lakenheath, England. Equipped with B-29 Superfortresses, the wing's primary mission was training for strategic bombardment operations. In early 1949, the B-29s began to be replaced by the B-50 Superfortress, a B-29 derivative designed for atomic warfare with more powerful engines, a higher top speed, and a higher ceiling.

Air Force leaders remained dissatisfied with Chatham's facilities, and made plans to move the wing to better ones. The city of Savannah, however, offered the USAF the former Hunter Army Airfield, which was closer to the city (5 miles NW), along with 3,500 acres (14 km^{2}) of adjacent land for base expansions. Hunter Field was built in 1929 as Savannah Municipal Airport and in 1940 the Air Corps received approval to build a permanent base at the site. During World War II it was used both as a training base as well as an antisubmarine airfield during the war. In June 1946, the airfield was returned to the City of Savannah. In addition, Headquarters, Eighth Air Force was established in Savannah in January 1942, and there was a strong desire to have an Eighth Air Force wing be stationed in the area. On 29 September 1950, the 2d Bomb Wing moved to the reopened Hunter Air Force Base and Chatham was turned over to the City of Savannah, where it was redeveloped into a regional airport.

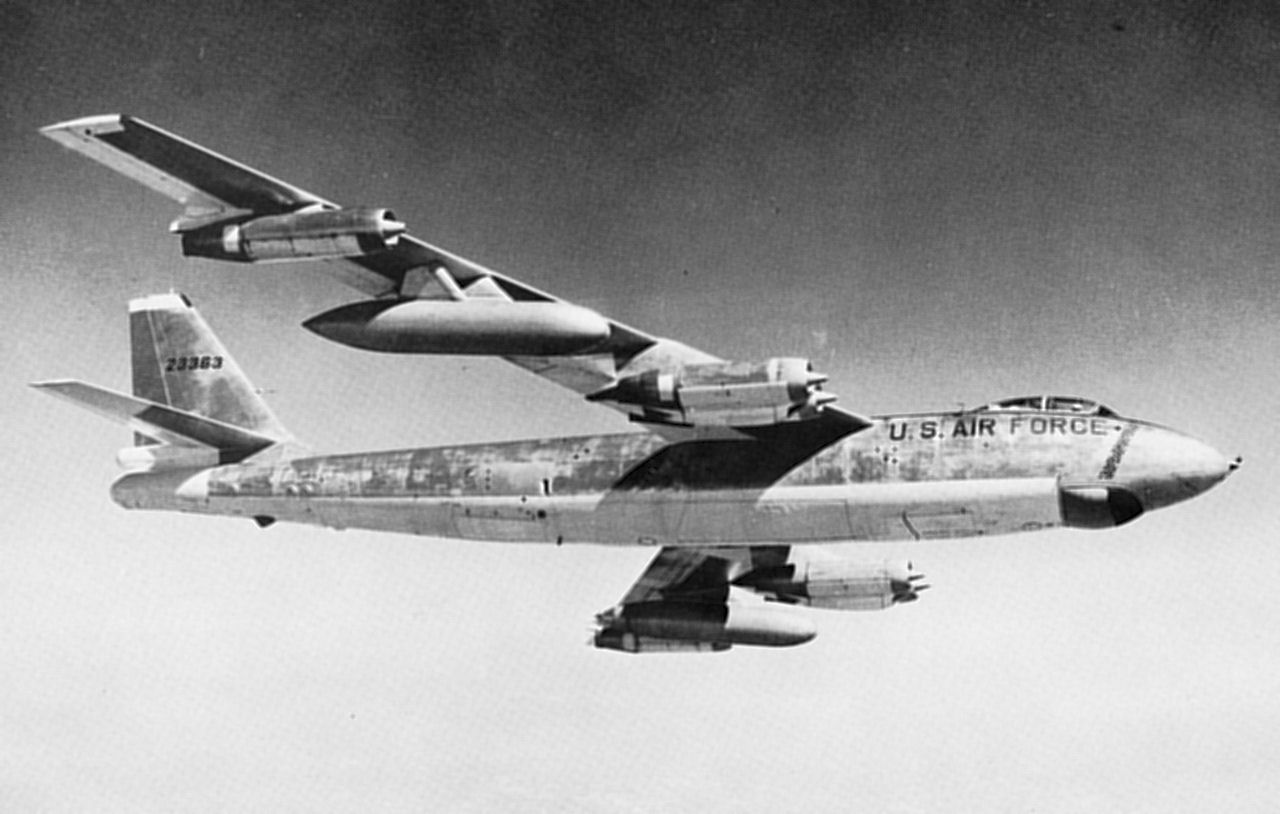
2d Bombardment Wing Boeing B-47E Stratojet 52-3363

B-50 Superfortress operations continued until November 1953, when the 2 BW began receiving jet-powered B-47E Stratojet medium bombers. The B-47 was a fast bomber that relied on speed to penetrate the air defenses of the Soviet Union. Produced in large numbers, it became the SAC's main medium bomber throughout the 1950s. The wing participated in SAC Operation Reflex deployments to North Africa and England. Beginning in 1958, the B-47 was becoming obsolete, as the air defenses of the Soviet Union improved. The Stratojet was phased out of SAC beginning in 1960.

Plans were made to upgrade the wing to the Boeing B-52 Stratofortress. However, although adequate for B-47 operations, the runway at Hunter was inadequate for B-52 operations when tested in the early 1960s. In addition, during the 1950s the urban area of the City of Savannah was expanding and encroaching on the airfield, making Hunter unsuitable for heavy nuclear-equipped bomber operations over the urbanized area. A 1958 Tybee Island B-47 crash in which a Mark 15 hydrogen bomb was lost in the Atlantic Ocean just off the coast of Savannah was another reason in the decision by SAC to move the Wing to a non-urban area.

In early 1963 the wing began to send its B-47s to storage at Davis-Monthan Air Force Base, Arizona. The 2d Bombardment Wing would be moved, and Hunter AFB was reassigned to Military Air Transport Service (MATS). MATS closed its facilities at Donaldson Air Force Base, South Carolina and reassigned the 63rd Troop Carrier Wing to Hunter, using the base for Douglas C-124 Globemaster II intercontinental cargo aircraft operations to points around the world.

=== B-52 Stratofortress ===
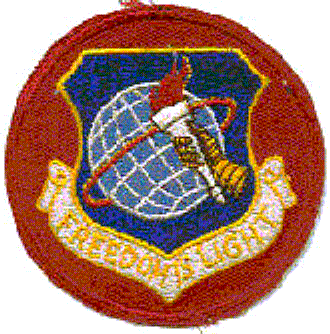
Patch with 4238th Strategic Wing emblem

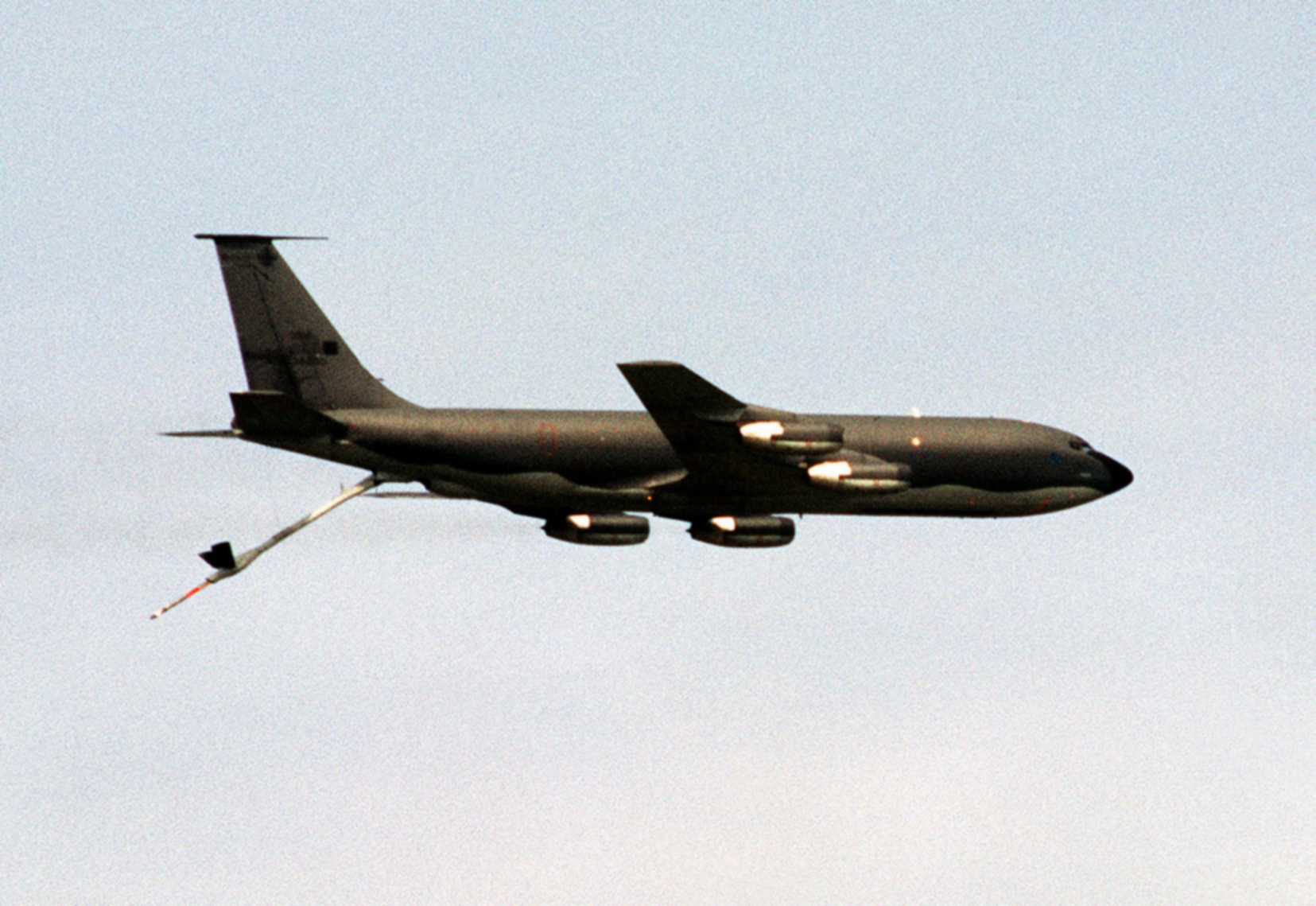
KC-135A of the 2nd Bomb Wing in 1992

The 2d Bombardment Wing moved to Barksdale AFB, Louisiana on 1 April 1963 where it assumed the existing B-52F Stratofortress heavy bombers and personnel of 4238th Strategic Wing (SW). The wing has been stationed at Barksdale continuously for over 50 years.

4238th Strategic Wing

B-52 operations at Barksdale can be traced to 1 March 1958 when SAC established the 4238th SW. and assigned it to the 4th Air Division as part of SAC's plan to disperse its Boeing B-52 Stratofortress heavy bombers over a larger number of bases, thus making it more difficult for the Soviet Union to knock out the entire fleet with a surprise first strike. The 4238th was initially assigned only three maintenance squadrons, but on 15 April, the 4238th Air Base Group was activated under the wing as the host organization for Barksdale when the 805th Air Base Group and the 301st Bombardment Wing were inactivated. The 301st and 376th Air Refueling Squadrons, flying Boeing KC-97 Stratofreighters were transferred to the wing from the 301st while the 20th Aviation Depot Squadron was transferred from the 805th to oversee the wing's special weapons. In June, the 913th Air Refueling Squadron, flying Boeing KC-135 Stratotankers was activated in anticipation of the arrival of the Boeing B-52 Stratofortress. The two KC-97 units were inactivated or transferred from Barksdale by 1962.

The wing gained its fourth operational squadron on 1 August when the 436th Bombardment Squadron (BS), consisting of 15 Boeing B-52 Stratofortresses moved to Barksdale from Carswell Air Force Base, Texas where it had been one of the three squadrons of the 7th Bombardment Wing. Starting in 1960, one third of the squadron's aircraft were maintained on fifteen-minute alert, fully fueled and ready for combat to reduce vulnerability to a Soviet missile strike. This was increased to half the squadron's aircraft in 1962. The 4238th (and later the 2d) continued to maintain an alert commitment until the end of the Cold War. In 1962, the wing's bombers began to be equipped with the GAM-77 Hound Dog and the GAM-72 Quail air-launched cruise missiles, The 4134th Airborne Missile Maintenance Squadron was activated in November to maintain these missiles.

2d Bombardment Wing, Heavy

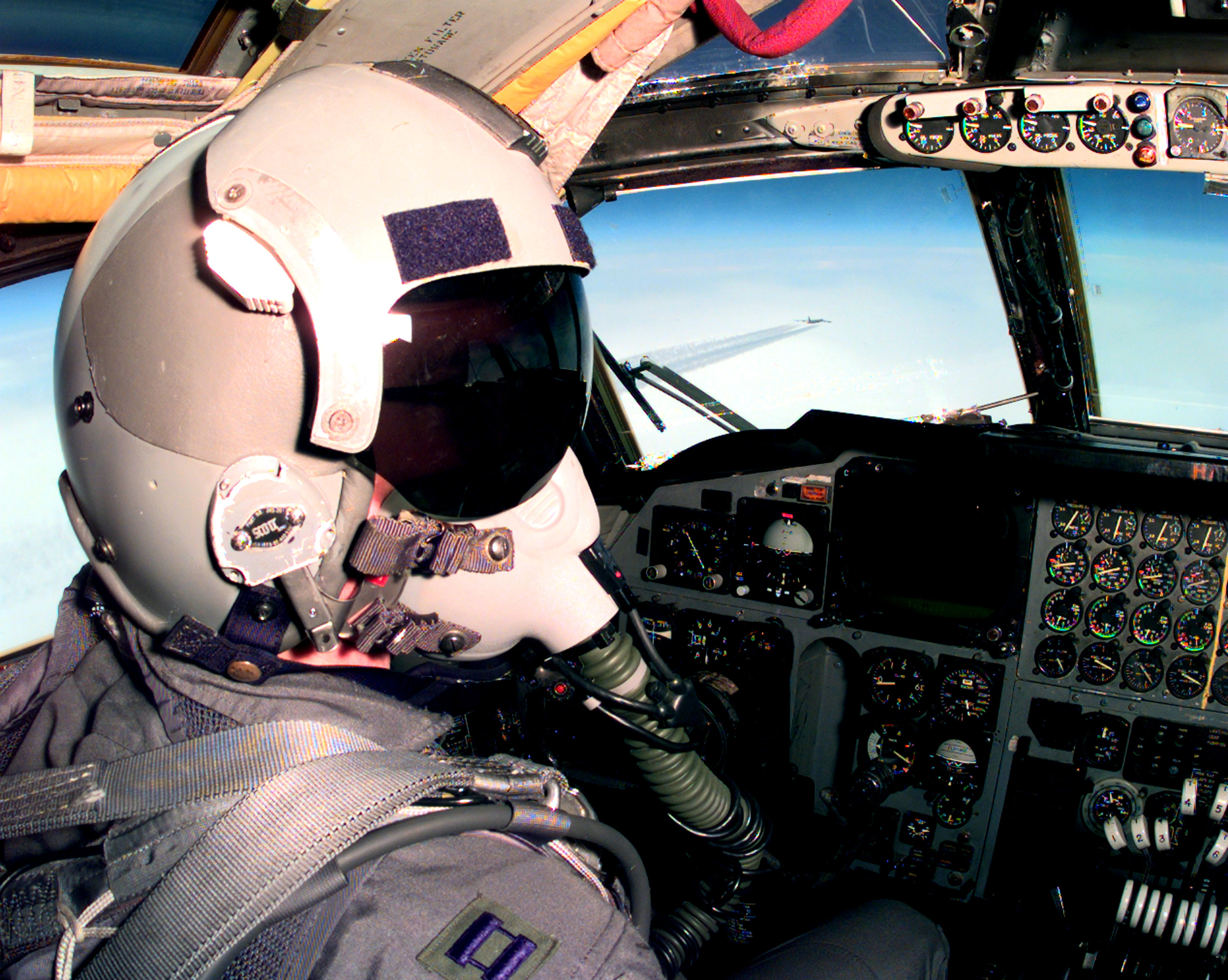
The Pilot of a 2d Bomb Wing B-52H in formation on a penetration mission during Operation Allied Force

In 1962, in order to perpetuate the lineage of bombardment units with illustrious World War II records, Headquarters SAC received authority from Headquarters USAF to discontinue its Major Command controlled (MAJCON) strategic wings that were equipped with combat aircraft and replace them with Air Force controlled (AFCON) units, which could carry a lineage and history. Rather than inactivate the 2d Bombardment Wing when Hunter closed, SAC moved it to replace the 4238th SW. and assume its mission, personnel, and equipment. (Note: The 2d Wing continued, through temporary bestowal, the history, and honors of the 2d Bombardment Group. It is also entitled to retain the honors (but not the history or lineage) of the 4238th.)

In the same way, the 20th Bombardment Squadron, one of the unit's historical bomb squadrons, replaced the 436th BS. The 855th Medical Group, 20th Munitions Maintenance Squadron and the 913th Air Refueling Squadron were reassigned to the 2d. The 4238th's support group and maintenance squadrons were replaced by ones with the 2d numerical designation. Each of the new units assumed the personnel, equipment, and mission of its predecessor.

At Barksdale, 2 BW supported Second Air Force's post-attack command and control system from April 1963 until March 1970. It conducted bombardment training and air refueling operations from April 1963 except for periods when all aircraft and crews were on loan to SAC organizations involved in combat operations in Southeast Asia. It began supporting SAC operations in Southeast Asia with aircraft and personnel in 1965, and increasingly supported these operations in 1966 and 1967. On 15 April 1968, gained a second B-52 and a second KC-135 squadron, again becoming a SAC "super" wing. From late May 1972 until 26 October 1973, it loaned all wing B-52 resources to SAC organizations in the Far East and Southeast Asia. From May 1972 to early November 1972 the wing loaned all but four of the wing's KC-135s and a few aircrews to other SAC units. After the return of combat resources, the wing continued supporting SAC operations in Southeast Asia into 1975, on a reduced scale.

Gained KC-10 tankers in November 1981 to augment refueling operations for the USAF, AFRES, and ANG. Provided air refueling for rescue efforts in Grenada, October–November 1983, the attack on Libya, April 1986, and the invasion of Panama, December 1989 – January 1990. Presented the Omaha Trophy for "the Outstanding Wing in the Strategic Air Command" f2. Deployed B-52, KC-135, and KC-10 aircraft, aircrews, and support personnel to several locations in support of operations in Southwest Asia, 7 August 1990 – 17 April 1991.

==== 1991 Gulf War ====
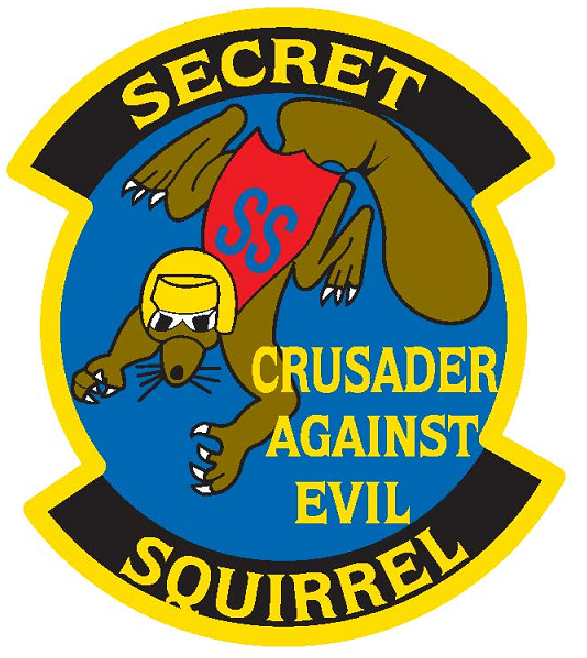
Secret Squirrel

Operations Desert Shield and Desert Storm brought Barksdale warriors into the spotlight again with their efforts to liberate Kuwait.

The 596th Bomb Squadron, 2d Bomb Wing flew what was then the longest combat mission in the history of military aviation at the start of Desert Storm in 1991. Seven B-52s flew a 35.4-hour mission on 16–17 January 1991 and, for the first time in U.S. Air Force history, fired a devastating barrage of conventional Air Launched Cruise Missile (CALCMs). The official name of this mission was SENIOR Surprise, unofficially it was referred to as Secret Squirrel. The 2d Bomb Wing delivered one-fourth of all U.S. Air Force bombs during Desert Storm. The 2d Bomb Wing KC-135s and KC-10s provided more than 1,000 of the 13,700 coalition refueling missions.

==== Post Cold War (1991 – present) ====
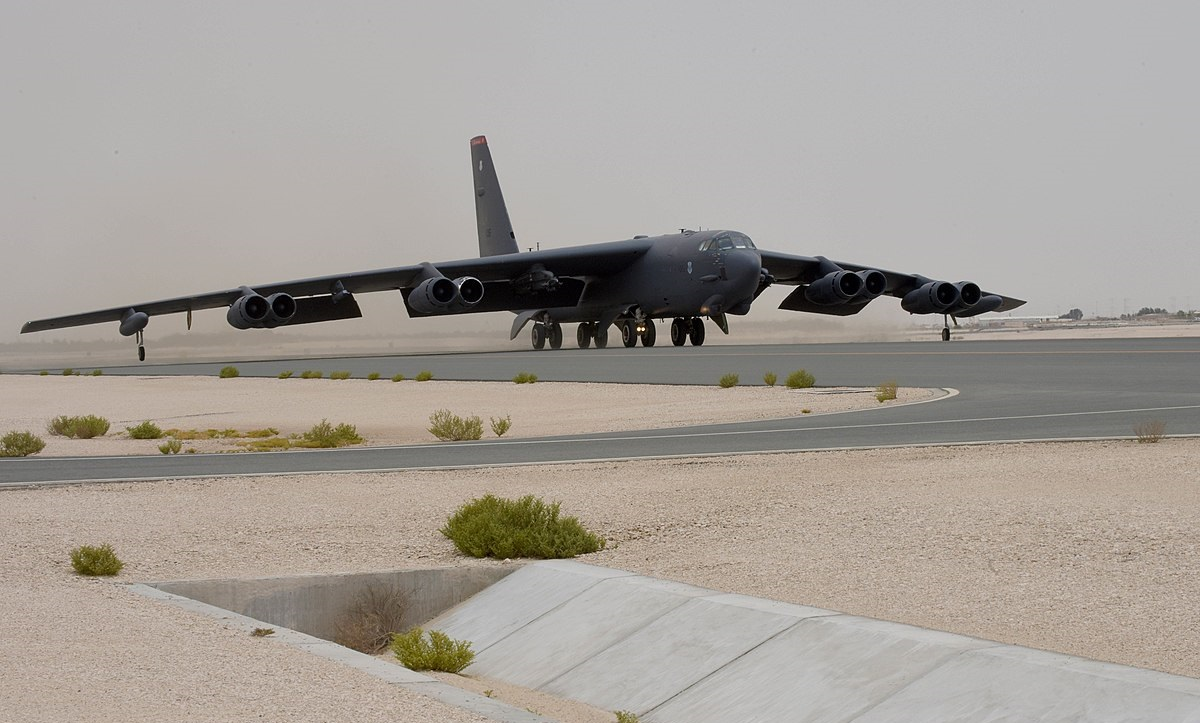
A U.S. Air Force B-52H Stratofortress, assigned to the 20th Expeditionary Bomb Squadron, at Al Udeid Air Base, Qatar, 12 May 2019

December 1992, saw the last B-52G leave Barksdale for long-term storage in Davis-Monthan Air Force Base, Arizona. and replaced with newer B-52H bombers. Also in December, the wing reclaimed the name of one of its original World War I bomb squadrons: the 20th Bomb Squadron. On 1 October 1993 the wing was renamed the 2d Bomb Wing and transferred its KC-135A Stratotankers and KC-10 Extenders to Air Mobility Command's 458th Operations Group at Barksdale Air Force Base.

On 1 August 1994 B-52H bombers two of the 2nd Bomb Wing flew the first-ever around-the-world bombing mission. The trip lasted 47.2 hours, the longest jet flight ever.

Two 2d Bomb Wing B-52s conducted a missile strike against surface-to-air missile sites and air defense radars in Iraq in September 1996. Desert Strike was ordered in response to Iraqi attacks on Kurds in northern Iraq. The mission earned the wing the prestigious 1996 Mackay Trophy as the most meritorious flight of the year.

The 2d Bomb Wing took part in Operation Southern Watch, Desert Fox and Allied Force throughout the late 1990s.

On 19 September 2001, wing elements deployed to Diego Garcia and on 7 October flew early attacks on targets in Afghanistan in Operation Enduring Freedom to rid that country of terrorist bases and its extremist Taliban rulers and Al-Qaeda militants; later flew airborne alert missions and, in Operation Anaconda, flew bombing missions against targets in eastern Afghanistan, 1–18 March 2002. In the 2003 Invasion of Iraq, flew missions on 21 March in "shock and awe" strikes against command and control targets.

21 March 2013 saw the first successful live run with a Sniper Advanced Targeting Pod marking the start of fleetwide integration for the B-52H. The pod gives the bomber a much needed precision strike capability.

The 2d Bomb Wing has also participated in deployments to Qatar as part of operations to combat ISIS. The U.S. Pacific Command's (PACOM) Continuous Bomber Presence (CBP) mission is supported with regular deployments to Andersen AFB, Guam by the 2d Bomb Wing.

On 15 October 2025, B-52s from the 2d Bomb Wing flew in formation with F-35s off the coast of Venezuela in a show of force during a time of escalating tensions between the United States and Venezuela involving US strikes on boats the US accused of smuggling drugs.

== "Wise Guy" restoration ==
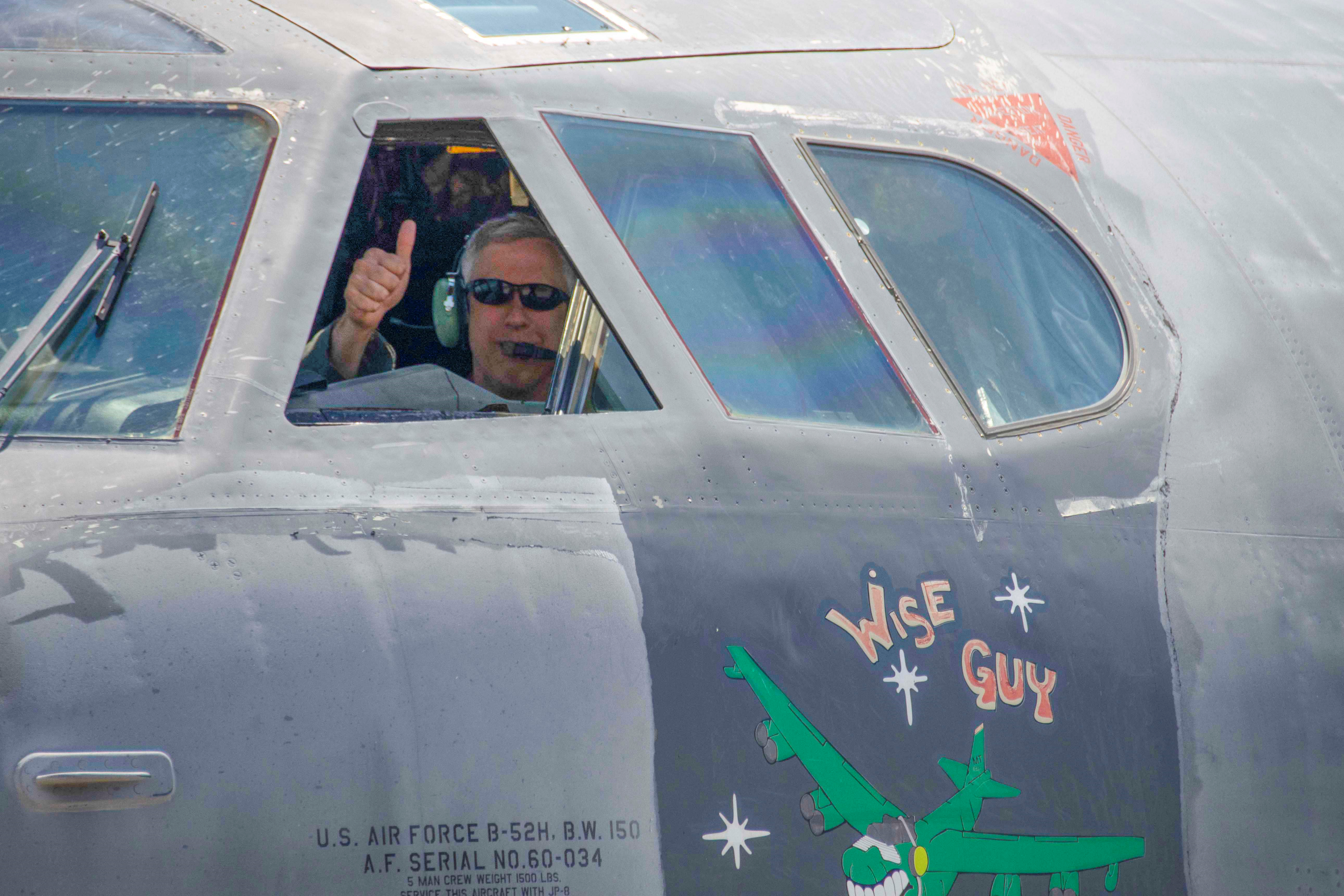
Col. Robert Burgess, 307th Operations Group commander, gives a thumbs up after flying B-52H Stratofortress "Wise Guy," to Barksdale Air Force Base, La., 14 May 2019.

"Wise Guy" 60-034 is the second B-52 to be regenerated from the 309th Aerospace Maintenance and Regeneration Group (AMARG) at Davis-Monthan Air Force Base in Arizona. On Tuesday 14 May 2019 "Wise Guy" took to the skies once again with Col. Robert Burgess, CO of the 307th Operations Group, 307th Bomb Wing, flew the bomber back to Barksdale AFB. "Wise Guy" 60-034 had served with the 5th Bomb Wing at Minot AFB and was flown to the Bone Yard in 2008.

It was ferried to Oklahoma City Air Logistics Center at Tinker Air Force Base in Oklahoma in April 2020 for depot maintenance and final restoration. Depot maintenance was completed in March 2022. The B-52 will serve as a replacement for another one of Barkdale's 2nd Bomb Wing B-52H bombers that was destroyed in an accident at Anderson AFB, Guam on 19 May 2016.

== Lineage ==
- Established as 2d Bombardment Wing, Very Heavy on 15 October 1947

Organized on 5 November 1947
Redesignated: 2d Bombardment Wing, Medium on 12 July 1948
Redesignated: 2d Bombardment Wing, Heavy on 1 April 1963
Redesignated: 2d Wing on 1 September 1991
Redesignated: 2d Bomb Wing on 1 October 1993.

=== Assignments ===
- Eighth Air Force, 5 November 1947

Attached to 43rd Bombardment Wing, 17 November 1947 – 31 December 1948

- Second Air Force, 1 April 1950

Attached to 7th Air Division, 4 May-31 August 1951

- 38th Air Division, 10 October 1951

Attached to 7th Air Division, 10 September-4 December 1952
Attached to 5th Air Division, 4 August- 20 September 1954; 6 July-26 August 1956

- 6th Air Division, 1 November 1959
- 823rd Air Division, 1 April 1961
- 4th Air Division, 1 April 1963
- 19th Air Division, 1 September 1964
- 42d Air Division, 1 July 1965
- 19th Air Division, 2 July 1969
- 42d Air Division, 1 December 1982
- Eighth Air Force, 16 June 1988 – present

=== Components ===
Groups

- 2d Bombardment (later, 2d Operations): 5 November 1947 – 16 June 1952 (detached 17 November 1947 – 31 December 1948 and 18 February – 16 May 1950); 1 September 1991–present

Squadrons

- 2d Air Refueling Squadron: attached 10 February 1951 – 15 June 1952, assigned 16 June 1952 – 1 April 1963; assigned 3 January 1989 – 1 September 1991
- 11th Bomb Squadron: 1 July 1994–present
- 20th Bomb Squadron: attached 10 February 1951 – 15 June 1952, assigned 16 June 1952 – 25 June 1965
- 32d Air Refueling Squadron: 1 November 1981 – 1 September 1991
- 49th Bombardment Squadron: attached 10 February 1951 – 15 June 1952, assigned 16 June 1952 – 1 April 1963
- 62d Bombardment Squadron: 25 June 1965 – 1 September 1991
- 71st Air Refueling Squadron: 15 April 1968 – 1 September 1991
- 96th Bombardment Squadron: attached 10 February 1951 – 15 June 1952, assigned 16 June 1952 – 1 April 1963
- 308th Air Refueling Squadron: 1 July 1959 – 1 March 1960
- 429th Bombardment Squadron: 1 October 1958 – 1 January 1962
- 596th Bombardment Squadron: 15 April 1968 – 1 September 1991
- 913th Air Refueling Squadron: 1 April 1963 – 1 November 1981. (Active 15 March 1958 – 1 November 1981)

=== Stations ===
- Davis-Monthan Field (later Davis-Monthan Air Force Base), Arizona, 5 November 1947
- Chatham Air Force Base, Georgia, 1 April 1949
- Hunter Air Force Base, Georgia, 22 September 1950

Deployed at RAF Mildenhall, England, May–August 1951
Deployed at RAF Upper Heyford, England, September–December 1952
Deployed at Sidi Slimane Air Base, French Morocco, August–September 1954 and July–August 1956.

- Barksdale Air Force Base, Louisiana, 1 April 1963–present

=== Aircraft ===
- B-29 Superfortress, 5 November 1947 – 10 October 1951
- B-50 Superfortress, 5 November 1947 – 4 August 1954
- KB-29 Superfortress, 1 April 1950 – 4 August 1954
- KC-97 Stratofreighter, 4 August 1954 – 1 April 1963
- B-47 Stratojet, 4 August 1954 – 1 April 1963
- B-52 Stratofortress, 1 April 1963 –
- KC-135 Stratotanker, 1 April 1963 – 1994
- Boeing EC-135, 1966–1971
- Boeing RC-135, 1977–1980
- KC-10 Extender, November 1981 – 1 June 1992

=== Awards and campaigns ===
| Award streamer | Award | Dates | Notes |
|---|---|---|---|
| | Air Force Outstanding Unit Award | 1 November 1956 – 1 April 1957 | 2d Bombardment Wing |
| | Air Force Outstanding Unit Award | 1 July 1986 – 30 June 1987 | 2d Bombardment Wing |
| | Air Force Outstanding Unit Award | 1 July 1987 – 30 June 1989 | 2d Bombardment Wing |
| | Air Force Outstanding Unit Award | 1 October 1993 – 31 May 1995 | 2d Bomb Wing |
| | Air Force Outstanding Unit Award | 1 June 1995 – 31 May 1996 | 2d Bomb Wing |
| | Air Force Outstanding Unit Award | 1 June 1996 – 31 May 1997 | 2d Bomb Wing |
| | Air Force Outstanding Unit Award | 1 June 1998 – 31 May 2000 | 2d Bomb Wing |
| | Air Force Outstanding Unit Award | 1 June 2000 – 31 May 2002 | 2d Bomb Wing |
| | Air Force Outstanding Unit Award | 1 January 2008 – 31 December 2009 | 2d Bomb Wing |
| | Air Force Outstanding Unit Award | 1 January 2010 – 31 December 2011 | 2d Bomb Wing |

(Note: In addition to the following awards, the wing is entitled to display the two Distinguished Unit Citations earned by the 2d Operations Group during World War II.)

- Mackay Trophy (for the "Most Meritorious Flight of the Year") 1996
- Omaha Trophy (for the "Outstanding Wing in the Strategic Air Command") (2): 1988, 1992, 2015

In addition to the following awards, the wing is entitled to display the 16 campaign streamers earned by the 2d Operations Group during World War I and World War II

| Campaign Streamer | Campaign | Dates | Notes |
|---|---|---|---|
| | Grenada | 1983 | 2d Bombardment Wing |
| | Defense of Saudi Arabia | 2 August 1990 – 16 January 1991 | 2d Bombardment Wing |
| | Liberation and Defense of Kuwait | 17 January 1991 – 11 April 1991 | 2d Bombardment Wing |

== See also ==
- List of B-47 units of the United States Air Force
- List of B-50 units of the United States Air Force
- List of B-52 Units of the United States Air Force
