= John Brenkus =

American television personality (1971–2025)

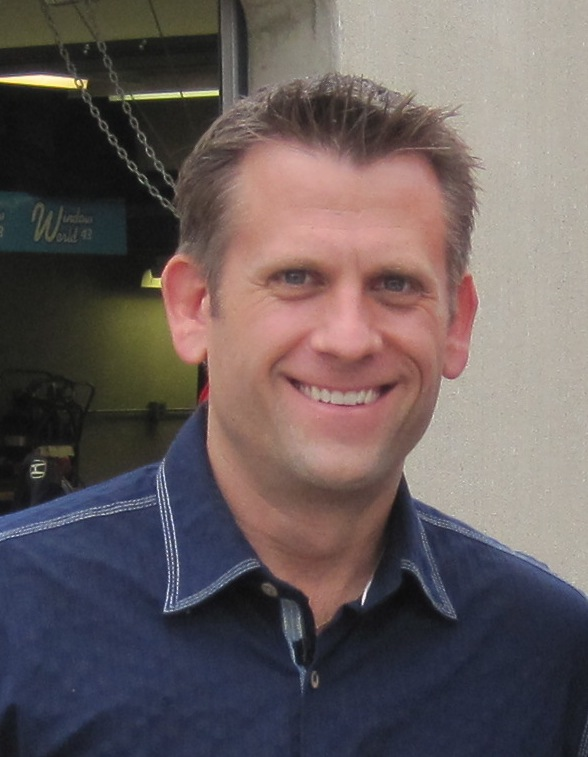
- Brenkus in 2010
- Born: July 2, 1971; Washington, D.C., U.S.
- Died: May 31, 2025 (aged 53); Virginia, U.S.
- Education: James Madison High School; University of Virginia (BA)
- Occupations: Television producer; presenter
- Organization: BASE Productions
- Known for: Brinx.TV
- Television: ESPN; Spike; Fox Sports Net
- Website: www.johnbrenkus.com

John Brenkus (July 2, 1971 – May 31, 2025) was an American producer, director and television personality. He was the co-founder and co-CEO of BASE Productions, a production company that specializes in creating reality television programs for channels such as Spike, National Geographic, and ESPN. His company's most popular programs include Fight Science and Sport Science, the latter for which he served as host. In 2013, he founded and became the CEO of his own media production company, Brinx.TV, which produced and was a platform for sports and general media coverage, as well as betting. Brenkus featured in or hosted a number of segments for Brinx.TV. He also hosted a podcast, The Brink of Midnight.

== Early life and education ==
Brenkus was born on July 2, 1971, in Washington, D.C. He grew up in Vienna, Virginia, and attended James Madison High School, where he played many sports.

He graduated from the University of Virginia.

== Production career ==
During the early years of his career, Brenkus produced numerous short films and music video projects before launching full-time into film and television writing, production and direction. Brenkus also invested in (and shot the music videos for) DC-area band Emmet Swimming. He also served as the co-CEO and co-founder of BASE Productions, a production company founded in 1992 that produces reality television shows and documentaries.

=== Sport Science and ESPN ===
Brenkus created and hosted Sport Science, a television series that presented the concepts of the science and engineering that underlined athletic endeavors. Initially running as an hour-long show on Fox Sports Networks in 2007, Brenkus then sold the television series to ESPN in 2010, where it aired as a segmented show until 2017. The show often was filmed inside a Los Angeles airport hangar or on location using a mobile laboratory with the focus on testing certain aspects of athletics (such as human flight and reaction time), re-analyzing sporting moments (including "deflategate" in 2015), or trials and tribulations and puts man against animals or machines.

Sport Science was a spin-off of the 2006 series Fight Science: Calculating the Ultimate Warrior, which emphasized more of the science than the fighting, on the National Geographic channel. When speaking to NPR in 2011 about the creativity that went into creating Sport Science, Brenkus said that it was a collaborative effort between the network, staff, athletes, and audience. The show was nominated for four Sports Emmy Awards in 2008 for Series 1, winning for Outstanding Graphic Design. Series 2 was nominated in 2009 for five Emmys and received two awards – again for Outstanding Graphic Design and also for Outstanding New Approaches in Sports Programming.

=== Brinx.TV ===
In 2021, Brenkus founded and became the CEO of Brinx.TV, which produced and was a platform for sports and general media coverage, as well as betting. Brenkus featured in or hosted in some segments for Brinx.TV. He teased The Goat Code in 2023 as "Sports Science On Steroids"; the program used career and physical science analysis, along with guest interviews, with notable guests such as Dwight Freeney, Jim Covert, Drew Pearson, Walter Jones, Mike Singletary, and Marcus Allen.

Brinx.TV also partnered with a number of events and organizations, being announced as the Title Sponsor for the 2024–2025 World Downhill Skateboarding Championship with the Brinx Cup, partnering with Icon Source on The NIL House, and reaching a multi-year broadcast agreement with the American Cornhole League. Brenkus hosted and produced a number of live broadcast events at Brinx.TV, such as the 2024 WBC Super Featherweight Championship bout, "Hit Like a Girl, Fight Like a Champion," featuring Alycia Baumgardner vs Delfine Persoon.

== Other projects ==
In 2010, Brenkus wrote The New York Times bestselling book The Perfection Point. In the book, Brenkus sets out to discover the limits for nine athletic events. The book details Brenkus's analysis of a wide variety of athletes to provide an in-depth look at the absolute limits of human performance. In a 2013 interview with Mashable, Brenkus was asked whether or not humans will continue to keep accomplishing new levels of athletic achievement, or if there is a limit to what people are capable of athletically. He answered specifically from his book, stating "there obviously has to be a limit when you factor in what it means to be human, the rules of sports and what the human body is capable of. There are absolutely limits to how fast we can run, how high we can jump, how long we can hold our breath". Brenkus later said in a Time interview that the book's point was "not about the destination but the journey", and it regarded "really about what are we as a species going to do as we try to achieve perfection".

Brenkus formed a band, named The Brink of Midnight, with his then-wife, Lizzie. They wrote a Christmas song that went viral, which they used to raise money for unite4:Good. He also hosted a podcast with the same name.

== Personal life and death ==
Brenkus died on May 31, 2025, at the age of 53. His death was announced on June 1, through his company Brinx.TV's social media. In the statement it said he "had been battling depression" and that he "lost his fight with this terrible illness". The Virginia Department of Health's chief medical examiner confirmed to TMZ that Brenkus had died by suicide.

In 2023, Brenkus revealed he had previously attempted suicide, following the sale of Sport Science to ESPN.
