= Lockney Independent School District =

School district in Texas

Lockney Independent School District is a public school district based in Lockney, Texas (USA).

Located in Floyd County, a very small portion of the district extends into Hale County.

In 2009, the school district was rated "academically acceptable" by the Texas Education Agency.

== Schools ==
- Lockney High School (Grades 9–12)
- Lockney Junior High School (Grades 6–8)
- Lockney Elementary School (Grades PK-5)
- Providence School (Grade 1–8) Grad would then attend Lockney High School

== 2009 fire ==
A fire on January 11, 2009, destroyed the 80-year-old Lockney High School building and damaged the junior high building as well.
