= Police POV =

American documentary television series (2011–2012)

- Genre: Reality; Documentary
- Created by: John Brenkus; Mickey Stern
- Narrated by: Wes Johnson
- Composers: David Velez (5 episodes, 2011); Rob Gokee (2 episodes, 2011)
- Country of origin: United States
- Original language: English
- No. of seasons: 2

Production
- Executive producers: John Brenkus; David Leepson; Mickey Stern
- Producers: Rob Dorfman; Christopher Voos (field producer: on-location footage); Chad Horning (field producer)
- Production locations: Cincinnati, Ohio; Fort Smith, Arkansas; Chattanooga, Tennessee
- Editors: Blake Armstrong; David Koenig; Alexandra LoRusso; Sean Mathew; Bryan Planer; Andrew Wardlaw; Jesse Wright
- Camera setup: AXON camera
- Running time: 19-21 minutes
- Production company: BASE Productions

Original release
- Network: TruTV
- Release: April 17, 2011 – May 6, 2012

Police POV is an American documentary television series that originally aired on TruTV and shows police officers in action from a unique perspective: as if the viewer is watching the action through the eyes of the police officer (or from their Point of View.) While it is common practice for police activities to be recorded for training purposes or to be used in a trial, the act is most often performed with fixed cameras mounted on the dashboard of a police vehicle or through the use of a videographer holding a hand-held camera. Police POV instead uses headset-style cameras called an AXON camera with the recording lens close enough to the wearer's eye to give the viewer a direct sightline of the events. The show featured officers from the Cincinnati, Fort Smith, and Chattanooga police departments.
