= George J. Eade =

United States Air Force general (1921–2018)

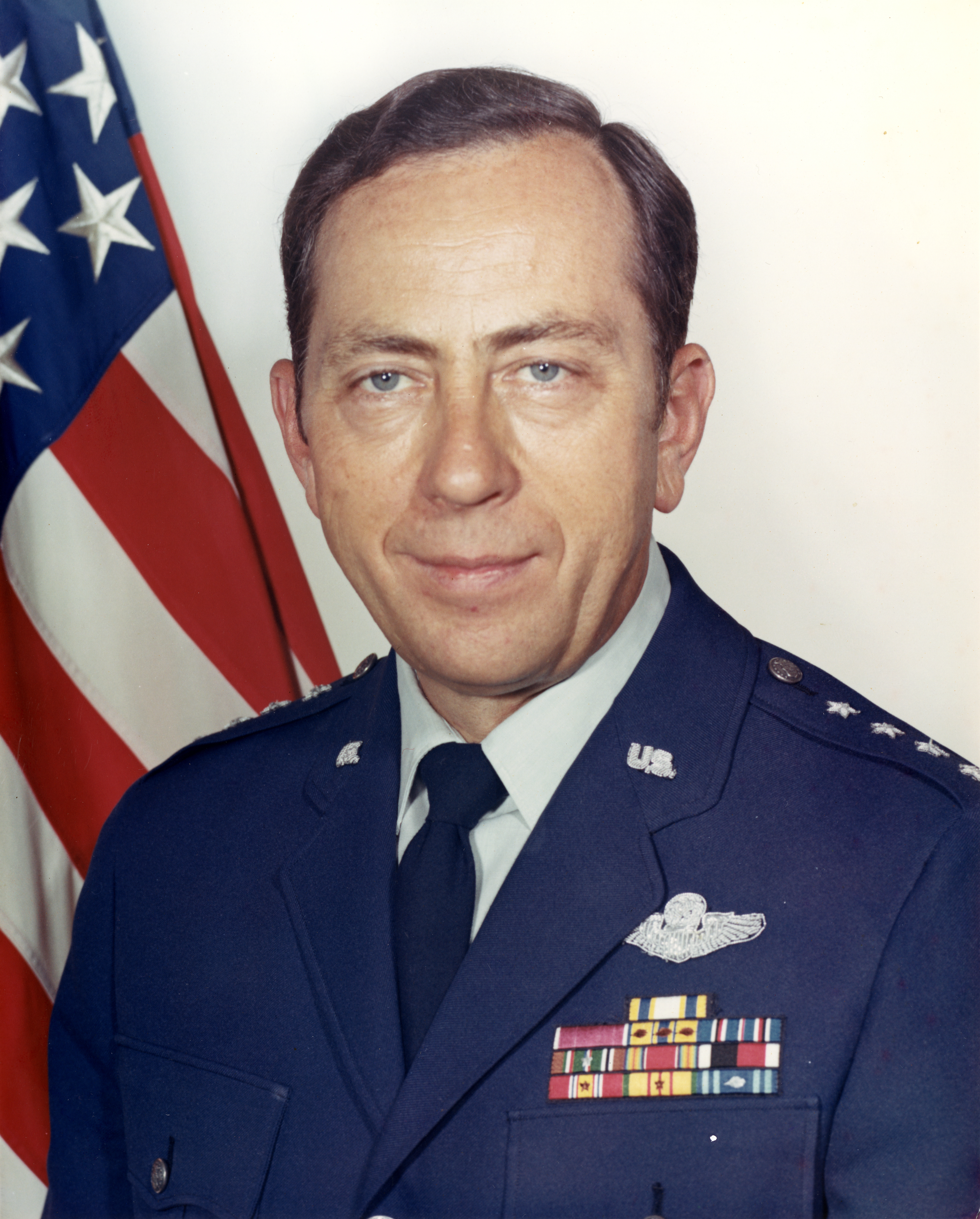
- General George J. Eade, Deputy Commander in Chief, United States European Command
- Born: October 27, 1921; Lockney, Texas
- Died: August 26, 2018 (aged 96); Healdsburg, California
- Military career
- Allegiance: United States
- Branch: United States Air Force
- Service years: 1942–1975
- Rank: General
- Commands: 7th Bombardment Wing; 4238th Strategic Wing; 1st Strategic Support Squadron
- Conflicts: World War II
- Awards: Air Force Distinguished Service Medal (3); Legion of Merit

George James Eade (October 27, 1921 – August 26, 2018) was a four star general in the United States Air Force who served as Deputy Commander in Chief, United States European Command from 1973 to 1975.

== Early life ==
Eade was born in Lockney, Texas, in 1921. He graduated in 1939 from York High School in Elmhurst, Illinois, and attended the Illinois Institute of Technology.

== Military career ==
Eade entered military service as an aviation cadet in January 1942 from Chicago, Illinois, and, that September was awarded his pilot wings and a commission as a second lieutenant in the Army Air Corps. He flew 37 combat missions in the European Theater of Operations, where he served almost four years as a pilot, flight commander and operations officer.

Eade began a long tour of duty with the Strategic Air Command in August 1946, when he joined the 43d Bombardment Wing at Davis-Monthan Army Air Field, Arizona, as a pilot of B-29 aircraft. In September 1947 he was assigned as operations officer and, later, commander of the 1st Strategic Support Squadron, which provided SAC with close airlift support for its global operations.

In May 1952 Eade went to SAC headquarters, where he was chief of the Current Operations Branch, Directorate of Operations. From 1956 through 1958, he was the deputy director of operations at SAC's 7th Air Division in England.

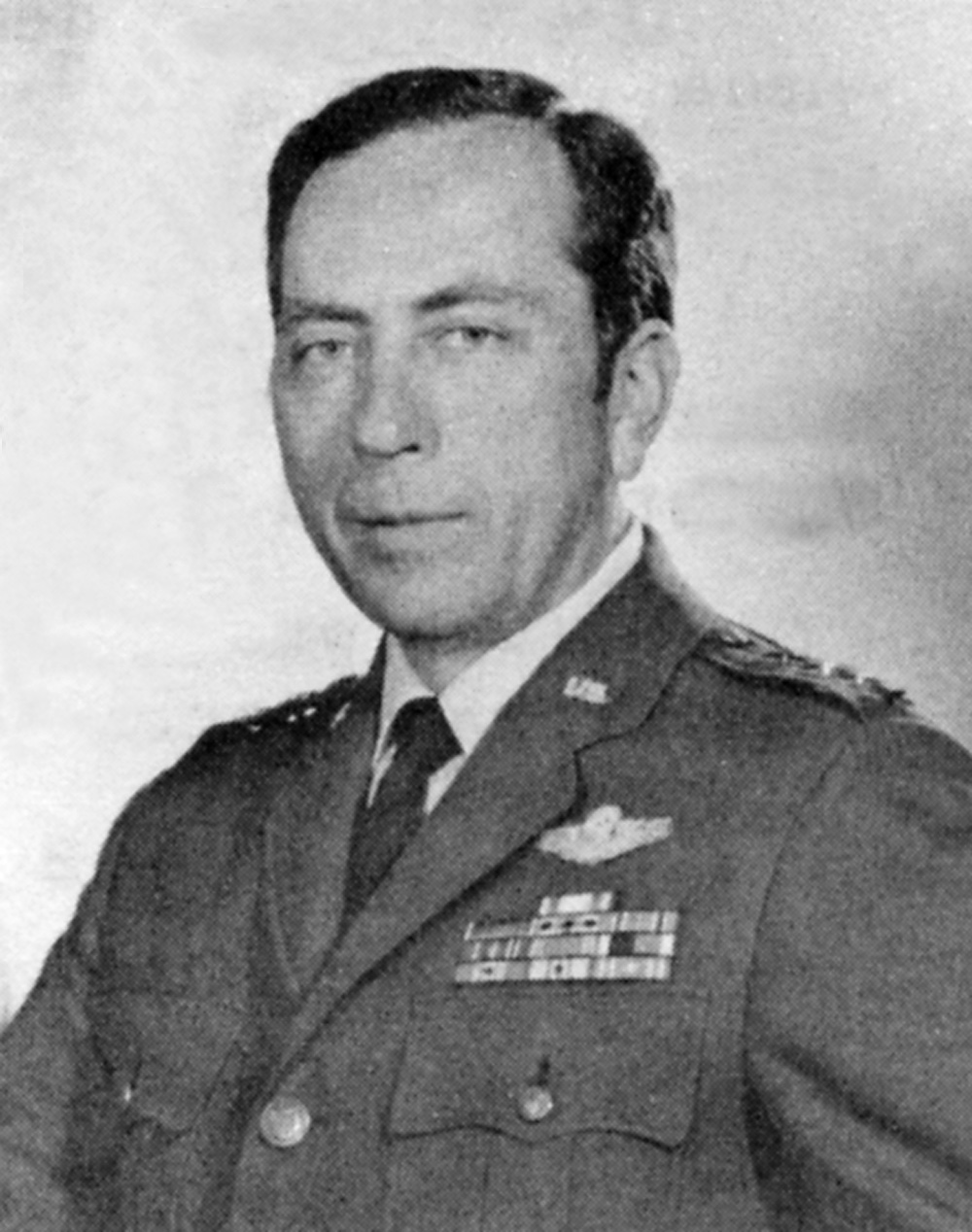
General George J. Eade

After he returned to the United States in November 1958, he served as deputy commander for operations and then commander of the 4238th Strategic Wing (redesignated 2d Bombardment Wing) at Barksdale Air Force Base, Louisiana. From June 1961 to July 1963, he commanded the 7th Bombardment Wing at Carswell Air Force Base, Texas.

In July 1963 Eade returned to SAC headquarters as chief of the Safety Division. It was during this assignment that SAC was awarded the Daedalian Flying Safety Trophy for 1964. In January 1965 he was assigned as chief of the Control Division, and in July 1967 he assumed duties as director of operations plans, deputy chief of staff for operations, with additional duties as chief, Single Integrated Operational Plans Division, Joint Strategic Target Planning Staff, of the Organization of the Joint Chiefs of Staff.

Eade was assigned to Headquarters U.S. Air Force in February 1970 as director of plans, office of the Deputy Chief of Staff, Plans and Operations. In January 1971 he assumed duties as the assistant deputy chief of staff, plans and operations, and in April he became the deputy chief of staff, plans and operations. He assumed duties as deputy commander in chief of the U.S. European Command April 20, 1973. He retired from the Air Force on September 1, 1975.

== Awards and decorations ==
Eade's military decorations and awards include the Air Force Distinguished Service Medal with two oak leaf clusters, Legion of Merit, Air Force Commendation Medal with three oak leaf clusters, and the Army Commendation Medal. He was rated a command pilot.

== Effective dates of promotion ==
Insignia	Rank	Date
	General	April 18, 1973
	Lieutenant general	April 23, 1971
	Major general	August 1, 1969
	Brigadier general	September 1, 1966
	Colonel	March 27, 1956
	Lieutenant colonel	August 15, 1951
	Major	December 27, 1945
	Captain	July 18, 1944
	First lieutenant	September 21, 1943
	Second lieutenant	September 5, 1942
