= Destination Marfa =

2021 American science fiction film

- Movie poster
- Directed by: Andy Stapp
- Written by: Andy Stapp
- Produced by: Stelio Savante; Starla Christian
- Starring: Tony Todd; Stelio Savante; Tracy Perez; Richard Riehle; Neil Sandilands
- Cinematography: Olivia Kuan
- Edited by: Andy Stapp
- Music by: Andy Stapp, Dustin Garrett, Lindsay Boering, Hannah Jackson, and Sol Seppy
- Production company: AStapp Films Fairway Film Alliance: SP Releasing
- Distributed by: SP Releasing
- Release dates: June 22, 2021 (Manhattan Film Festival); August 3, 2021 (United States)
- Running time: 91 minutes
- Country: United States
- Language: English

Destination Marfa is a 2021 American science fiction film written and directed by Andy Stapp and starring Tony Todd, Stelio Savante, Tracy Perez, Richard Riehle, in his final film role, and Neil Sandilands. In 2021 Andy Stapp was awarded Hollywood's Best First-Time Filmmaker The film is inspired by the phenomenon of the Marfa lights which are a popular tourist attraction year round culminating with a celebration in the form of the Marfa Lights Festival.

== Plot ==
Four friends on their way home from a Texas cookoff weekend stop at a gas station, where they encounter a fortune teller. They ultimately decide to make a last stop in Marfa, Texas, in the hopes of viewing the strange Marfa Lights.

== Cast ==
- Tony Todd as Henry, The Mayor
- Stelio Savante as Vincent, The Hitchhiker
- Tracy Perez as Allie Holliwell
- Richard Riehle as "Skeeter", Cashier #1
- Neil Sandilands as Norman, The Man At The Bar
- Brittany Jo Alvarado as Eden Percell
- Kyle Colton as Matthew Bench
- Marcus Jahn as Erik Streett
- Kimberley Christann Pember as Donna, The Waitress
- Scot Scurlock as Wilmer, The Man In The Dark
- Lisa Roumain as Zoe

== Production ==
The film was written, directed, and executive produced by American filmmaker Andy Stapp.

It was shot on-location in Texas, including in the city of Marfa and in the West Texas towns of Plainview, Valentine and Lockney. In Marfa, The El Paisano Hotel was used both as a shooting location and accommodation for several of the cast and crew. Prada Marfa was also used as the location where the four lifelong friends Eden, Matthew, Eric and Allie pick up the hitchhiker, Vincent.

== Release ==
On November 23, 2020, it was announced that Fairway Film Alliance had acquired worldwide sales rights to the film.

Joblo.com released the first clip and trailer of the film in March 2021.

Deadline Hollywood announced that the film will be released on August 3, 2021, through SP Releasing.

Broadway World announced the film's premiere at the Manhattan Film Festival where it took home the best horror film award in June 2021.
