= Hankook =

South Korean tire manufacturer

- Native name: 한국타이어앤테크놀로지 주식회사
- Type: Public
- Traded as: KRX: 161390
- Industry: Auto and truck parts
- Founded: 10 May 1941; 85 years ago (as Chosun Tire Company)
- Founder: Cho Hong-jai
- Headquarters: Bundang-gu, Seongnam-si, South Korea
- Key people: Cho Hyun-bum (CEO)
- Brands: Hankook; Optimo; Laufenn
- Revenue: ▲KRW 21.2022 trillion (2025)
- Operating income: ▲KRW 1.8425 trillion (2025)
- Number of employees: 21,000 Worldwide
- Parent: Hankook & Company
- Website: www.hankooktire.com

Hankook Tire & Technology Co., Ltd. (Korean: 한국타이어앤테크놀로지 주식회사; Hanja: 韓國타이어앤테크놀로지株式會社; RR: Hanguk-Taieo-aen-Tekeunolloji Jusikhoesa), also known simply as Hankook (/ˈhæŋkʊk/ HANG-kuuk, Korean: [haːnɡuk̚]), is a South Korean tire company based in Seoul. It is the seventh-largest tire company in the world. It is a part of Hankook & Company.

== History ==
Hankook Tire was established in 1941 as "Chosun Tire Company" (Japanese: 朝鮮タイヤ工業) and was renamed to "Hankook Tire Manufacturing" in 1968. Both Hankook and Chosun literally mean "Korea".

The company now supplies tires as original equipment to various automakers. In addition to producing about 102 million tires annually, the company also sells batteries, alloy wheels, and brake pads.

In 2011, Hankook Tire Co. announced that the company would invest $1.1 billion to build a factory in West Java, Indonesia as part of a plan to become the 5th largest tire manufacturer in the world. On June 9, 2011 a ground breaking ceremony was held at a 60-hectare area as a regional hub production for export to Asian, North America and Middle East countries.

In October 2013, the company announced plans to open a new factory in Clarksville, Tennessee which was later opened in October 2017.

In November 2014, the company announced the launch of its second brand, Laufenn. In January 2025, the company announced the launch of its European sub-brand, Optimo. The Optimo brand complements Hankook's existing premium and associate brands focused on passenger car tires.

== Facts and figures ==
According to Modern Tire Dealer, Hankook's new tire sales for 2007 were $3.5 billion, a 20.7% year-over-year increase from 2006 ($2.9 billion).

== Global offices ==
The company has its headquarters in South Korea and has manufacturing facilities in South Korea, the People's Republic of China, Hungary, Indonesia, and the United States. It has technical centers in Daejon, Korea; Akron, Ohio; Hannover, Germany; Osaka, Japan; and China.

In April 2016, the company announced it would move its North American headquarters from Wayne, New Jersey, to Nashville, Tennessee. This move is reported to create up to 200 jobs in Davidson County and the company would be investing $5 million in the process.

== Motorsports involvement ==
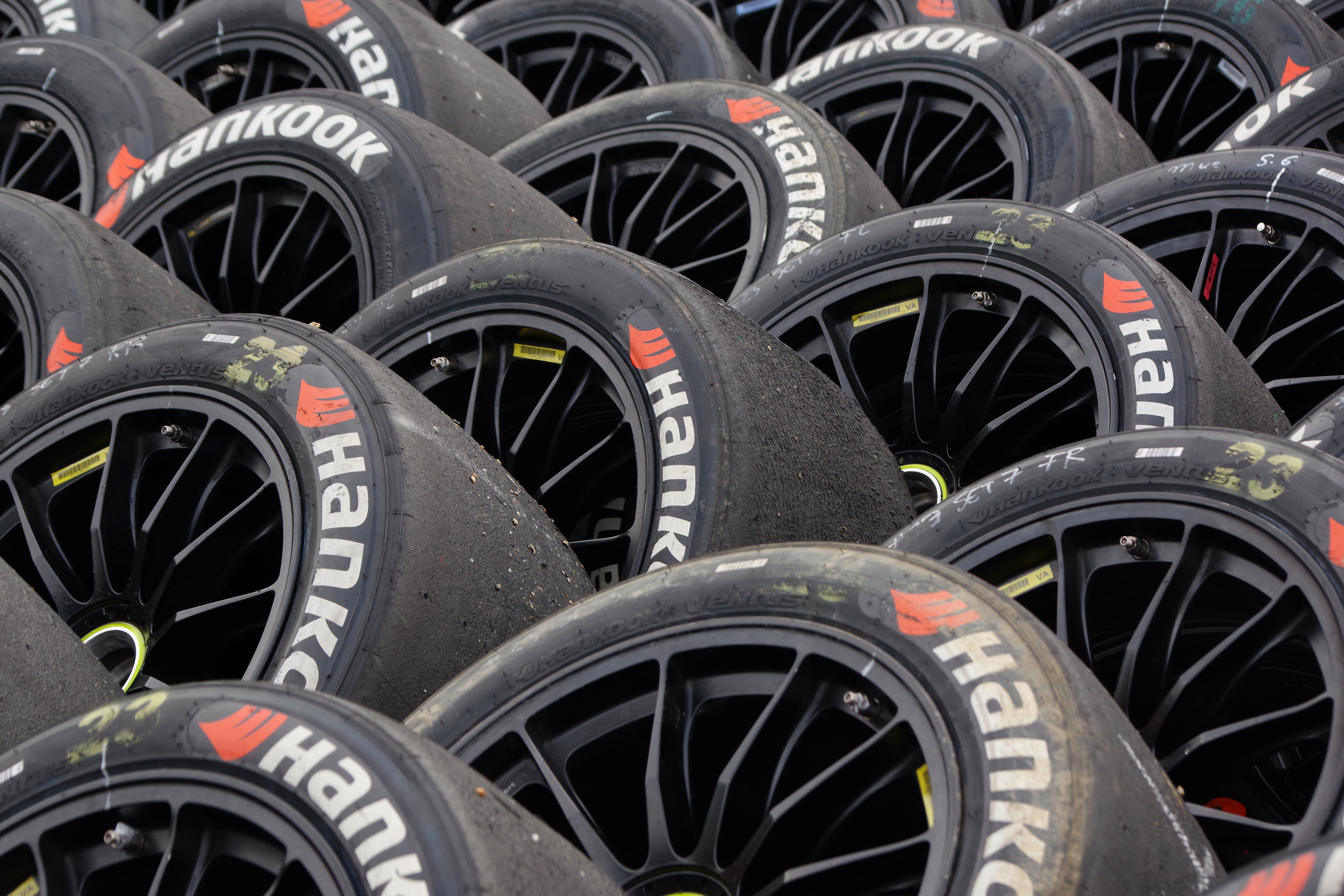
Hankook DTM tyres

Hankook entered motorsports in Europe, North America, and in Asia. They signed with FBR (Farnbarcher Racing) to race a Ferrari F430 GT with Hankook Tires in the 2009 Le Mans Series season. The company supplied tires for the Primetime Race Group that raced in the GT2 class of the American Le Mans Series in 2008. It supplied tires from 2007 to 2009 for IMSA Prototype Lites, a support series for the American Le Mans Series. Since 2009, the Hankook Team Farnbacher has competed in the GT class of the Le Mans Series. It also supplies tires for the Hankook KTR team that races in the Super GT and the Asian Le Mans Series and for the Formula 3 Euroseries.

In rallying, Hankook were the series sponsors of the Scottish Rally Championship. Its tires have been used at the European-based Intercontinental Rally Challenge as well.

Hankook was the tire supplier of the Deutsche Tourenwagen Masters from 2011 to 2020.

Hankook sponsored Formula Drift driver Chris Forsberg, a three-time champion (with his most recent championship coming as recent as the 2016 season), until the 2018 season. Hankook was also involved in drifting sponsorship in a number of countries, most notably in North America in the Formula D championship and in Ireland in the Prodrift championship.

Hankook was the official tire supplier for Super Taikyu championship series that held in Japan from 2021 until 2023. Due to the fire which severely damaged Hankook's Daejeon plant in 2023, the company withdrew its supplying contract for the Super Taikyu series. As the result, Bridgestone took over Hankook's position in Super Taikyu on 24 April 2023, and effective immediately as initially announced, to start the contract for the 2024 season.

Hankook replaced Michelin as the official tire supplier for Formula E for its third-generation car starting from the 2022–23 season to the 2025–26 season.

Starting in 2025, Hankook will be the official tire supplier for the World Rally Championship, replacing Pirelli, on a three-year contract.

== Sponsorships ==
Hankook sponsors Real Madrid, Bundesliga club Borussia Dortmund, Ligue 1 club AS Monaco FC, Serie A club SSC Napoli, and NIFL Premiership club Carrick Rangers.

Hankook was once the major sponsor of the Melbourne Football Club in the Australian Football League.

Hankook sponsors the English rugby union team Northampton Saints.

Hankook sponsors the New Zealand Super Rugby team the Crusaders.

Hankook is one of the sponsors of the UEFA Europa League since 2012. In 2021, Hankook's partnership with UEFA was renewed and will include sponsoring the new UEFA Europa Conference League through the Laufenn brand.

Hankook was the official tire supplier of the reality TV series Car Warriors.

From 2017 to 2022, Hankook was one of the major sponsors of the Kontinental Hockey League.

Hankook is also involved with sim racing, as the main sponsor for Liga ZGT and ApexGT e-Sports, Brazilians Gran Turismo Sport Simracing League. Since 2019, Hankook is the main sponsor of SVRT, a Gran Turismo Sport sim racing team.

Since 2018, Hankook has been the official tire of Major League Baseball and sponsored the 2020 MLB Wild Card Series.

In 2021, Hankook will be sponsoring the 3DBotMaker Diecast Racing League on YouTube.
