= Lockney High School =

Location
- 410 SW 4th Street; Lockney, Texas 79241; United States; 34.1210°N 101.4469°W

Information
- School type: Public high school
- School district: Lockney Independent School District
- Principal: Todd Hallmark
- Grades: 9-12
- Enrollment: 132 (2023-2024)
- Colors: Red & Black
- Athletics conference: UIL Class 2A
- Mascot: Longhorn
- Yearbook: Round Up
- Website: Lockney High School

Lockney High School is a public high school located in the city of Lockney, Texas, USA and classified as a 2A school by the UIL. It is a part of the Lockney Independent School District located in northwestern Floyd County. In 2015, the school was rated "Met Standard" by the Texas Education Agency.

== 2009 Fire ==
A fire on January 11, 2009, destroyed the 80-year-old Lockney High School building and damaged the junior high building. Arson was suspected in the blaze.

== Athletics ==
The Lockney Longhorns compete in these sports -

Cross Country, Football, Basketball, Powerlifting, Tennis, Track, Baseball & Softball

=== State Titles ===
- Boys Cross Country -
  - 1985(2A), 1986(2A)
