= Crime 360 =

- Country of origin: United States
- No. of seasons: 2
- No. of episodes: 30

Production
- Running time: 44 minutes

Original release
- Network: A&E
- Release: March 6, 2008 – September 3, 2009

Crime 360 is an American reality television show based on homicide detective units in various cities across the United States, including Richmond, Virginia; Rochester, New York; Little Rock, Arkansas; Indianapolis, Indiana; Cleveland, Ohio. The detective units in each of these cities use a Leica or a Deltasphere three-dimensional scanner to photograph the crime scene.

It is produced by BASE Productions.

== Content ==
The show is a reality television series featuring "state-of-the-art 360-degree, digital photography and incredible CGI visualizations", according to press releases by A&E. The Leica Camera Scan Station was one such camera used on the show.

== Critical reception ==
Barry Garron of The Hollywood Reporter gave the show a mostly negative review, stating that "there are a lot (actually, too much) of computer-generated graphics, but for the most part, this is just Cops with a community college degree." Kevin McDonough of the Daily Journal World was more positive, referring to the show as "CSI...without all of those Jerry Bruckheimer special effects".
