= Sport Science (TV program) =

- Directed by: John Brenkus
- Country of origin: United States
- Original language: English
- No. of seasons: 3
- No. of episodes: 24

Production
- Executive producers: David Leepson; John Brenkus

Original release
- Network: FSN (season 1–2); ESPN (season 3)
- Release: September 30, 2007 – October 20, 2009

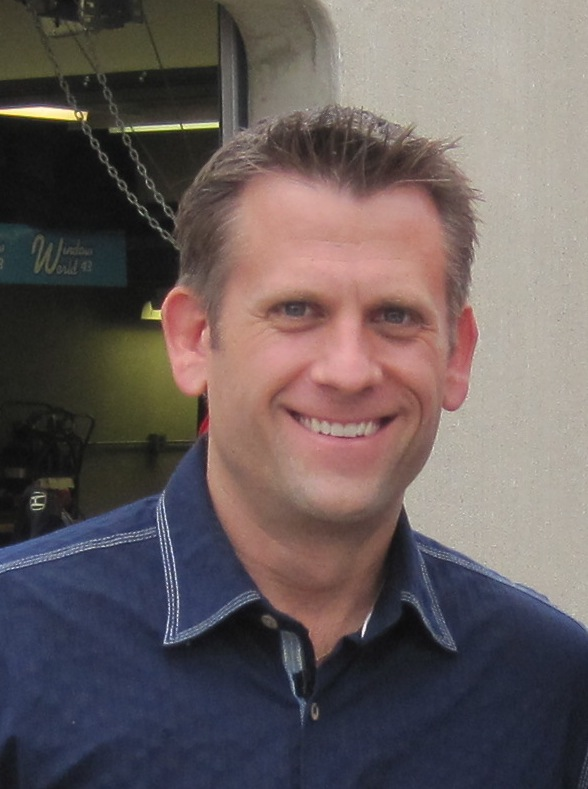
John Brenkus, the host of Sport Science, in May 2010.

Sport Science is a television series that explores the science and engineering underlying athletic endeavors. It was originally filmed as a 12-part series that was broadcast on FSN from September 9, 2007, to April 20, 2008 (season 1). The second season (2009) also aired on FSN. Season 3 (2010) was picked up by ESPN. ESPN, who has changed the name of the series to SportScience, has yet to air new episodes. Instead, the network has chosen to air various SportScience vignettes during programs such as SportsCenter. Sport Science is a spinoff of its predecessor Fight Science on National Geographic. Season 1 of Sport Science is currently available for streaming from TVNZ OnDemand.

The series was filmed inside a Los Angeles airport hangar or on location using a mobile laboratory. Each episode on season 1 focused on testing certain aspects of athletics (such as human flight and reaction time), while season 2 either poses more questions from previous episodes, or tries to re-analyze sporting moments or trials and tribulations, puts a human against animals or machines, or even checking against other sports or challenging the odds with data gathered using motion sensors and accelerometers. Professional athletes are featured prominently and are used to test the limits of the human body. In addition, host John Brenkus also participated in cases where an "average Joe" was required.

The lead engineer throughout the Sport Science series has been Dr. Cynthia Bir, Professor of Biomedical Engineering at Wayne State University in Detroit, Michigan. Using methods that have been developed to understand human injury biomechanics, and developing new techniques to address the unique challenges found when studying live volunteers in high impact and high speed activities, Dr. Bir helps viewers to understand the forces (internal and external) sustained and generated by the body during high level athletic activities.

Sport Science was nominated for four Sports Emmy Awards in 2008 for season 1, winning for Outstanding Graphic Design. Season 2 received even more accolades in 2009, being nominated for five Emmys and receiving two awards, for Outstanding Graphic Design and also for Outstanding New Approaches in Sports Programming.

John Brenkus died on May 31, 2025, following a battle with depression.
