= Fight Science =

- Genre: Sports, History, Fighting
- Narrated by: Robert Leigh
- Country of origin: United States
- Original language: English

Fight Science is a television program shown on the National Geographic Channel in which scientists and martial arts masters work together to analyze the world's fighting techniques, to compare the disciplines and to find out which one has the strongest hits, kicks and deadliest weapons. The show also tries to prove through science if certain legends in fighting are possible, such as whether a one-punch knockout is possible or if ninja are as nimble and deadly as stories tell. There is also a feature on human strength, where in it a man hits his head on bricks in order to shatter them. The show had several spin-offs including Sport Science.

The narrator is Robert Leigh.

It featured fighters including Melchor Menor, Tito Ortiz, Bas Rutten, Randy Couture, Alex Huynh, Amir Perets, Mindy Kelly, Bren Foster, Amir Solsky, Glen Levy and Dan Inosanto.

== Legend tests ==
- The agility of a martial artist practicing ninjutsu (Glen Levy) was confirmed by revealing that one's center of gravity was constantly shifted to balance properly within the limit of the foot. It can be done but takes much practice and possibly years of training.
- The one-punch knockout and shattering bricks with one's head were confirmed, but only as a perfect shot, and therefore unlikely to be seen in a real-life fight.
- The so-called "death punch" performed by ninjutsu practitioner Glen Levy was mostly confirmed. Delivering a precise type of hammer-fist blow to the chest deflected the ribcage 2 inches into the chest cavity, causing damage measuring 0.8 in Viscous Criterion (a measurement of soft-tissue damage).
- The Iron Shirt defensive body technique was demonstrated by a Shaolin warrior monk, who was hit with a wooden staff across the back while he was pushing down on a blunt spear by the base of his throat at over 2100 pounds of force that would have killed an ordinary man, and yet was unscathed and unbruised.

== Weapon tests ==
All weapons were rated on range, control and impact.

- Eskrima sticks and the bō were revealed to show extension of range and good control, but would break if sufficient impact was delivered.
- The nunchaku and the three section staff showed good extension, but it was revealed to be out of control for a fraction of a second after striking an opponent and some of the impact was absorbed due to its flexibility.
- Shuriken and Bows were really only effective at long-range rather than close-up because once the shuriken was thrown or the arrow released, it was completely out of the user's hands.
- Swords originally came in two variants: stabbing (like a rapier) or slashing (like a scimitar), but the katana was proven to be highly effective at both.

== Episode list ==
Several follow-up episodes were released which focus on more specific fighting techniques and associated myths.

1. "Pilot" (April 30, 2007)
2. "Mixed Martial Arts" (January 27, 2008)
3. "Special Ops" (January 27, 2008)
4. "Fighting Back" (June 9, 2008)
5. "Ultimate Soldiers" (February 1, 2010)
6. "Fight Like an Animal" (February 4, 2010)
7. "Stealth Fighters" (February 11, 2010)
8. "Human Weapons" (February 18, 2010)
9. "Super Cops" (February 25, 2010)

== See also ==
- Human Weapon
- Fight Quest
- Deadliest Warrior
- Kill Arman
