= Car Warriors (TV series) =

- Title card
- Genre: Reality TV
- Created by: David Leepson
- Presented by: Marc Istook; Jimmy Shine
- Country of origin: United States
- Original language: English
- No. of seasons: 2
- No. of episodes: 23 (list of episodes)

Production
- Executive producers: John Brenkus; Mickey Stern; David Leepson; John Davis; Dan Schulman
- Running time: 45 min
- Production company: BASE Productions

Original release
- Network: Speed (United States)
- Release: February 23, 2011 – May 9, 2012

Car Warriors is an American automotive reality TV show produced by BASE Productions that aired for two seasons on Speed in the United States and Discovery Communications affiliates in international markets. For season 1, each episode pits an all-star car restoration team against a rival team from a different city to restore and modify their car in less than 72 hours. The challenging team has a chance to take home not only their car, but the All Stars' car should they win the contest; otherwise, they go home empty-handed if they lose. Season 2 replaces the All Stars with another local restoration team, as both teams have 48 hours to transform their cars for a chance to keep them in the end.

== Concept ==
=== Season 1 ===
The show's premise is a time-attack competition similar to Iron Chef, but with cars. In each episode, the All Stars (red) take on a challenging team (blue) from a renowned automotive restoration shop in their town to restore and modify their car in less than 72 hours. Each team is given a similar mystery car to work on, along with their own workshop in the studio and a plethora of car parts and accessories supplied by NAPA Auto Parts and Hankook. As part of the contest, both teams participate in the "Engine Challenge", which is either of these two formats:

- Move the car into the lift, remove the engine from the car and haul it to the "victory box", a goal marked by a square.
- Install the wheels on the car, remove the jack stands and wheel the car into the victory box.

The first team to reach the goal chooses one of two specialty engines to install on their car as part of their build.

As the clock ticks, both teams must concentrate on the five steps of car building:

1. Design
2. Interior, fabrication and suspension
3. Engine installation
4. Paint
5. Reassembly and interior installation

Once the clock expires, both cars are placed under scrutiny by a panel of judges based on four criteria:

1. Interior
2. Exterior
3. Engine bay
4. Performance

If the challenging team wins the contest, they get to take home both their car and the All Stars' car. However, if they lose, they go home with nothing.

=== Season 2 ===
For Season 2, instead of having the All Stars, two local teams are pitted against each other, and the timer is shortened to 48 hours. Each team is assigned a lead technician to assist them in their build. The car building essentials list has been simplified into four categories:

1. Engine and transmission
2. Suspension
3. Body and paint
4. Interior

Halfway through the deadline, the clock is stopped for both teams to participate in a "Home Stretch Challenge" (ex. welding contest, carburetor reassembly contest). The winning team gets one extra hour of build time. The judging criteria are the same, except with Jimmy Shine as the sole judge. Shine also critiques the challenges faced by each team, especially if he involves himself in any of them.

After his assessments, Shine steps out for a few minutes to make his decision. He returns to the studio to hand the keys to the winning team, while the losing team goes home empty-handed.

== Cast ==
Season 1 of the show was hosted by Marc Istook. Jimmy Shine took over as the host in Season 2 while maintaining his position as the judge.

The All Stars of Season 1 consists of the following personnel:

- Rich Evans: Team leader. Owner of Rich Evans Designs, Evans was previously featured in Speed's Chop Cut Rebuild.
- Tommy "Itchy" Otis: Paint (except episode 2). Winner of the 2009 Von Dutch award for pinstriping.
- Ryan "Ryno" Templeton: Paint. An expert in painting, airbrushing and pinstriping, Templeton was featured in CMT's Trick My Truck, and he painted many of the motorcycles featured in the 2003 film Biker Boyz.
- Nicole Lyons: Engines and mechanics. Owner of Cole Muscle Cars, Lyons is a professional NASCAR and NHRA driver.
- Dave Cooke: Engines and mechanics. A British national who runs the Melrose, California, performance shop Well Oiled and works as a precision driver for television commercials.
- Joel Hoffman: Engine and mechanics (substituted Cooke on episodes 3-4, 6-7). Co-owner of JH Restorations & Customs.
- Ian Roussell: Fabricator. He previously worked as a shop foreman for the series Monster Nation.
- Eric Scarlet: Fabricator (episode 2)
- Tina Sharpe: Interior. An expert in car interior and upholstery, Sharpe runs Ames Sharpe Design.
- Scott Owens: Interior. His expertise is in car audio, as he holds the world record for car stereo decibels (179.4 dB generated from a 157,000 watt system)

The panel of judges include:

- Jimmy Shine (Seasons 1-2): Lead fabricator of So-Cal Speed Shop and star of the TV series Hard Shine.
- George Barris (Season 1): Legendary car customizer and father of the Batmobile from the Batman TV series.
- Mad Mike Martin (Season 1): Car customizer from Galpin Auto Sports, home of Pimp My Ride.

For Season 2, Shine is joined by two lead technicians:

- Brad Fanshaw: Owner of Bonspeed Wheels.
- Ray McClelland: Owner of Full Throttle Kustoms.

== Lawsuit ==
In 2011, Rick Sheley of SKJ Customs in St. George, Utah, sued Speed TV and its parent company FOX Sports for US$2 million, claiming that the show broke all of its own rules and that the All Stars threatened to quit if they were not declared the winners over his team. The lawsuit was eventually dropped when both parties reached an agreement.

== Future ==
The series was not renewed after the second season. Furthermore, Speed's transition to Fox Sports 1 makes a possibility for a new season unlikely. Starting in 2014, the Fox Sports regional networks have started airing reruns of both seasons.

From 21 October 2022 the streaming rights for both seasons have been purchased by Mech+.
