= John Sams =

John Sams may refer to:

- John Sams (cricketer), English cricketer
- John B. Sams, United States Air Force general
- John H. Sams (1839–1924), Florida pioneer
