= Timothy Ray =

US Air Force general

Timothy M. Ray
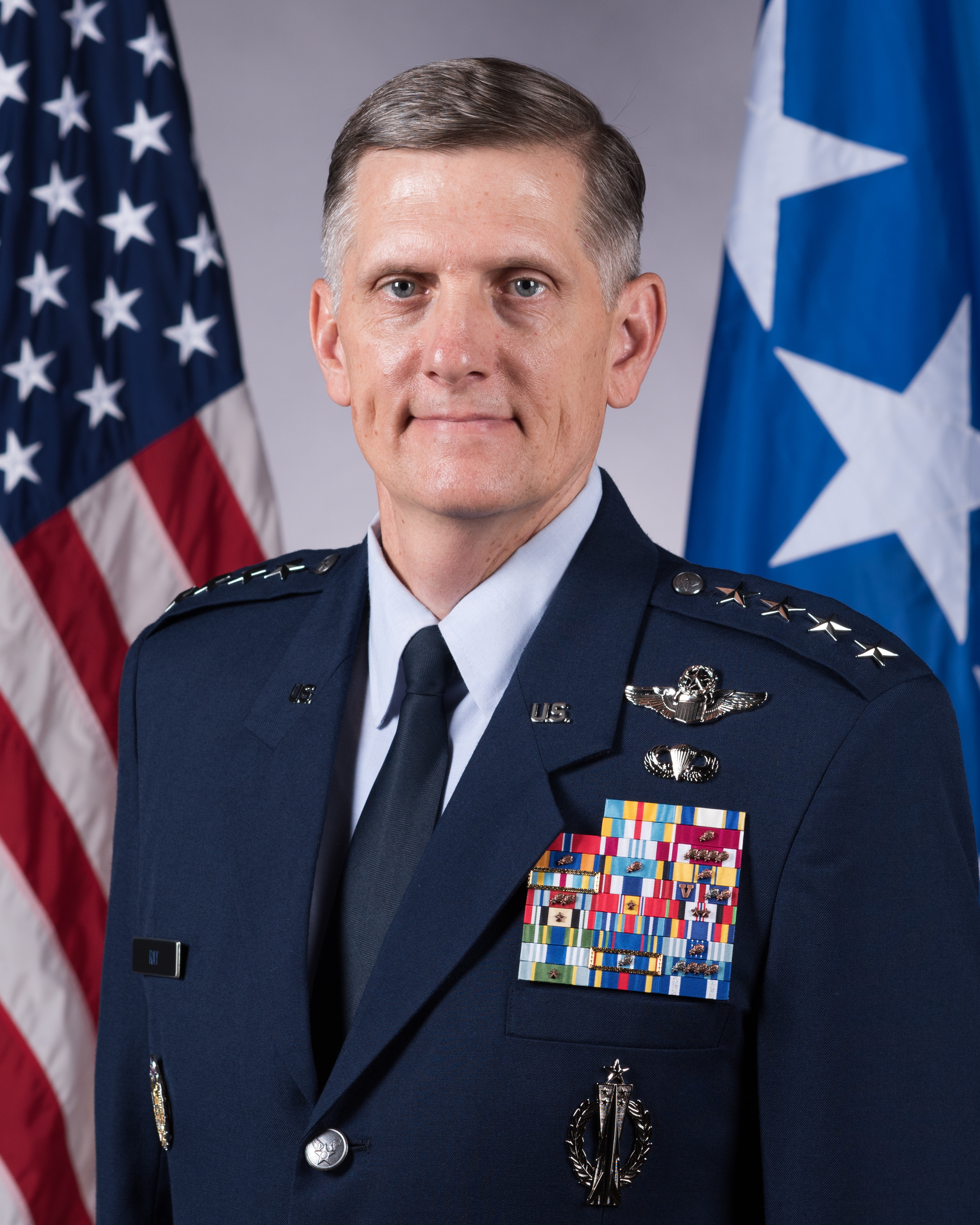
- Alma mater: United States Air Force Academy (BS); Embry–Riddle Aeronautical University (MS); Air War College (MS)
- Military career
- Allegiance: United States of America
- Branch: United States Air Force
- Service years: 1985–2021
- Rank: General
- Commands: Air Force Global Strike Command; Third Air Force; NATO Air Training Command-Afghanistan; 7th Bomb Wing; 96th Bomb Squadron
- Conflicts: War in Afghanistan; Iraq War
- Awards: Defense Distinguished Service Medal; Air Force Distinguished Service Medal (2); Defense Superior Service Medal; Legion of Merit (2); Bronze Star Medal

Timothy Michael Ray is a retired United States Air Force general who last served as the commander of Air Force Global Strike Command from August 21, 2018, to August 27, 2021. He concurrently served as the commander of Air Forces Strategic – Air, United States Strategic Command. His two previous assignments were as the Deputy Commander, United States European Command, and as the Commander, Third Air Force. He previously served as the director of global power programs in the Office of the Assistant Secretary of the Air Force for Acquisition, Headquarters United States Air Force, Washington, D.C.

== Military career ==
Ray is a native of DeLand, Florida. In February 2018, he was nominated for promotion to general and reassignment as the commander of the Air Force Global Strike Command. This nomination was confirmed by the United States Senate in March 2018. Prior to his current assignment, Ray served as the Deputy Commander, United States European Command in Stuttgart, Germany.

His retirement ceremony was held on July 1, 2021, but it took until August of the same year before his deputy, Lieutenant General Anthony J. Cotton officially relieved him as commander of Air Force Global Strike Command. Ray officially retired from the USAF on September 1, 2021.

== Education ==
- 1985 Bachelor of Science degree in Human Factors Engineering, U.S. Air Force Academy, Colorado Springs, Colo.
- 1994 Distinguished graduate, Squadron Officer School, Maxwell AFB, Ala.
- 1998 Master of Science degree in aviation sciences and management, Embry-Riddle Aeronautical University, Daytona Beach, Fla.
- 1998 Distinguished graduate, Air Command and Staff College, Maxwell AFB, Ala.
- 2004 Master of Science degree in strategic studies, Air War College, Maxwell AFB, Ala.
- 2008 Senior Executive Fellow, Harvard University, Cambridge, Mass.

== Assignments ==
1. August 1985 – August 1987, student, undergraduate pilot training, Williams AFB, Ariz.
2. August 1987 – October 1987, student, B-52 combat crew training, Castle AFB, Calif.
3. November 1987 – March 1993, B-52 flight commander, instructor and evaluator pilot, 23rd Bomb Squadron, Minot AFB, N.D.
4. March 1993 – March 1994, B-52 Flying Training Unit instructor pilot, Castle AFB, Calif.
5. March 1994 – June 1997, B-52 FTU instructor pilot and executive officer, 2nd Bomb Wing, Barksdale AFB, La.
6. June 1997 – July 1998, student, Air Command and Staff College, Maxwell AFB, Ala.
7. July 1998 – October 2000, Deputy Chief, Aircraft Team, U.S. Strategic Command, Offutt AFB, Neb.
8. October 2000 – June 2001, operations officer, 11th Bomb Squadron, Barksdale AFB, La.
9. June 2001 – July 2003, Commander, 96th Bomb Squadron, Barksdale AFB, La.
10. August 2003 – June 2004, student, Air War College, Maxwell AFB, Ala.
11. July 2004 – September 2005, Chief, Training, Readiness, Exercises and NEO Division (J37), U.S. Forces Korea, Yongsan Army Garrison, South Korea
12. September 2005 – July 2006, Vice Commander, 5th Bomb Wing, Minot AFB, N.D.
13. July 2006 – June 2008, Commander, 7th Bomb Wing, Dyess AFB, Texas
14. July 2008 – July 2009, deputy director of Air and Space Operations at Air Combat Command, Langley AFB, Va.
15. August 2009 – August 2011, Director of Operations, Air Force Global Strike Command, Barksdale AFB, La.
16. August 2011 – September 2012, Commanding General, NATO Air Training Command – Afghanistan, NATO Training Mission – Afghanistan/Combined Security Transition Command – Afghanistan and Commander, 438th Air Expeditionary Wing, Kabul, Afghanistan
17. September 2012 – January 2014, Director, Operational Planning, Policy and Strategy, Deputy Chief of Staff, Operations, Plans and Requirements, Headquarters U.S. Air Force, the Pentagon, Arlington, Va.
18. February 2014 – June 2015, Director, Global Power Programs, Office of the Assistant Secretary of the Air Force for Acquisition, Headquarters U.S. Air Force, the Pentagon, Arlington, Va.
19. July 2015 – October 2016, Commander, 3rd Air Force, Ramstein Air Base, Germany
20. November 2016 – August 2018, Deputy Commander, U.S. European Command, Stuttgart, Germany
21. August 2018 – August 2021, Commander, Air Force Global Strike Command, and Commander, Air Forces Strategic – Air, U.S. Strategic Command, Barksdale AFB, La.

== Flight information ==
Rating: Command Pilot.
Flight hours: more than 4,000.
Aircraft flown: T-37, T-38, B-52G, B-52H, B-1B, C-21, C-27A and C-208.

== Awards and decorations ==
US Air Force Command Pilot Badge
Basic Parachutist Badge
Senior Missile Operations Badge
Headquarters Air Force Badge

Defense Distinguished Service Medal
Air Force Distinguished Service Medal with one bronze oak leaf cluster
Defense Superior Service Medal
Legion of Merit with oak leaf cluster
Bronze Star Medal
Defense Meritorious Service Medal
Meritorious Service Medal with four bronze oak leaf clusters
Air Medal with oak leaf cluster
Aerial Achievement Medal with oak leaf cluster
Air Force Commendation Medal with oak leaf cluster
Joint Meritorious Unit Award
Air Force Meritorious Unit Award
Air Force Outstanding Unit Award with "V" device, one silver and one bronze oak leaf cluster
Combat Readiness Medal with two bronze oak leaf clusters
National Defense Service Medal with one bronze service star
Afghanistan Campaign Medal with two campaign stars
Iraq Campaign Medal with campaign star
Global War on Terrorism Expeditionary Medal
Global War on Terrorism Service Medal
Korea Defense Service Medal
Nuclear Deterrence Operations Service Medal
Air Force Overseas Short Tour Service Ribbon with oak leaf cluster
Air Force Overseas Long Tour Service Ribbon
Air Force Expeditionary Service Ribbon with gold frame and silver oak leaf cluster
Air Force Longevity Service Award with one silver and three bronze oak leaf clusters
Small Arms Expert Marksmanship Ribbon with service star
Air Force Training Ribbon
Order of National Security Merit Sam-Il Medal (Republic of Korea)
NATO Medal for service with ISAF

== Effective dates of promotion ==
Promotions
Insignia	Rank	Date
	General	Aug. 21, 2018
	Lieutenant General	July 2, 2015
	Major General	June 2, 2013
	Brigadier General	Nov. 2, 2009
	Colonel	Aug. 1, 2004
	Lieutenant Colonel	May 1, 2000
	Major	Feb. 1, 1997
	Captain	May 29, 1989
	First Lieutenant	May 29, 1987
	Second Lieutenant	May 29, 1985

Military offices
Preceded by Garrett Harencak	Commander of the 7th Bomb Wing; 2006–2008	Succeeded by Robert F. Gass
Preceded by David W. Allvin	Commander of the 438th Air Expeditionary Wing; 2011–2012	Succeeded by Steven M. Shepro
Preceded by Richard T. Devereaux	Director of Operational Planning, Policy, and Strategy of the United States Air Force; 2012–2014	Succeeded by Timothy G. Fay
Preceded by John Posner	Director of Global Power Programs of the Office of the Assistant Secretary of the Air Force for Acquisition; 2014–2015	Succeeded by Jon A. Norman
Preceded by Darryl Roberson	Commander of the Third Air Force; 2015–2016	Succeeded by Richard M. Clark
Preceded by William B. Garrett III	Deputy Commander of the United States European Command; 2016–2018	Succeeded by Stephen Twitty
Preceded by Robin Rand	Commander of the Air Force Global Strike Command; 2018–2021	Succeeded by Anthony J. Cotton
