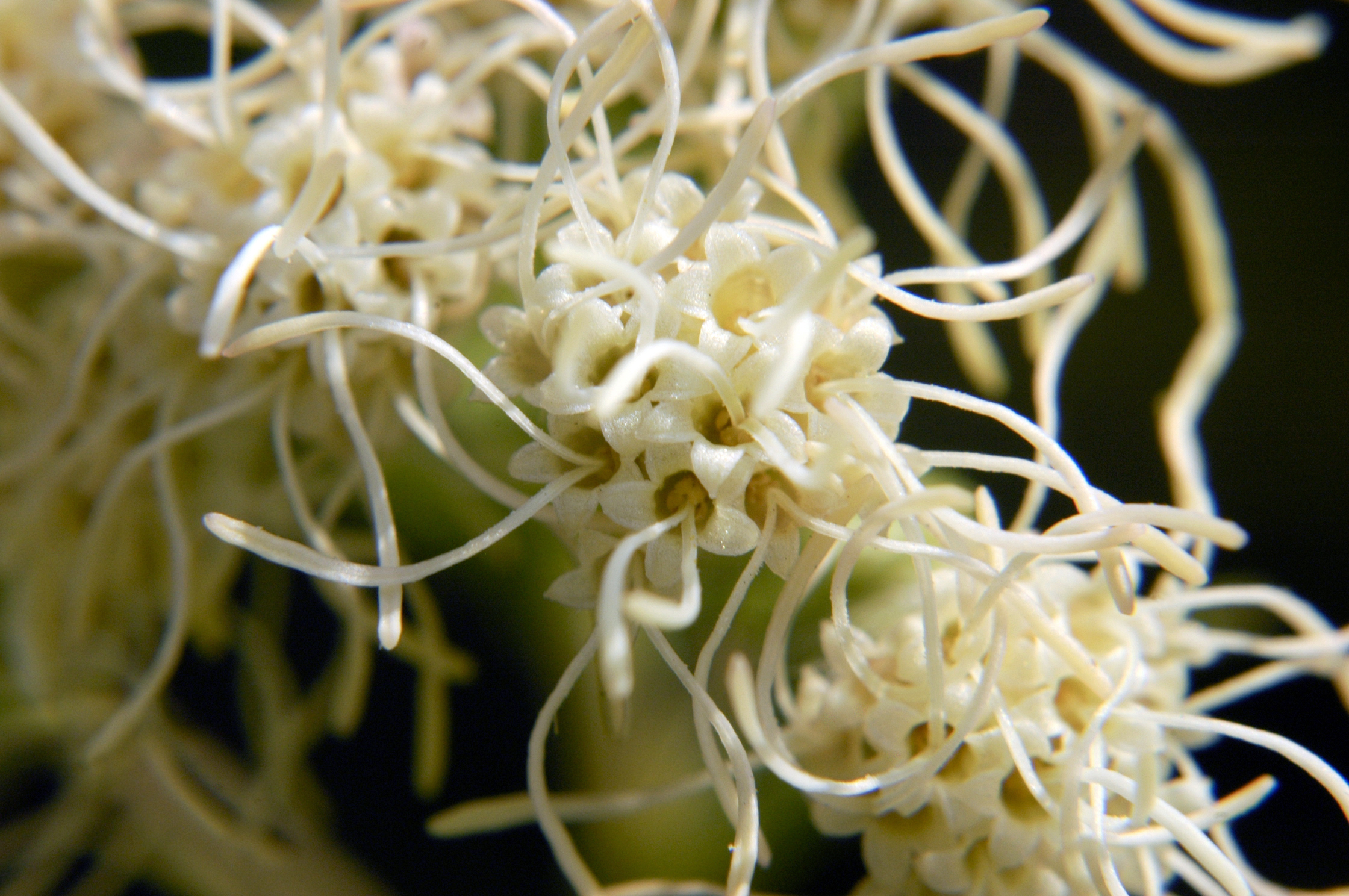
- Brickellia eupatorioides var. corymbulosa

Conservation status
- Secure (NatureServe)

Scientific classification
- Kingdom: Plantae
- Clade: Tracheophytes
- Clade: Angiosperms
- Clade: Eudicots
- Clade: Asterids
- Order: Asterales
- Family: Asteraceae
- Genus: Brickellia
- Species: B. eupatorioides

Binomial name
- Brickellia eupatorioides (L.) Shinners

Synonyms
- Synonymy: Brickellia rosmarinifolia (Vent.) W.A.Weber; Critonia kuhnia Gaertn.; Eupatorium alternifolium Ard.; Eupatorium kuhnia Crantz; Kuhnia altaica Raf.; Kuhnia cinerea Raf.; Kuhnia critonia Willd.; Kuhnia dasypia Raf.; Kuhnia divaricata Raf.; Kuhnia elliptica Raf.; Kuhnia eupatorioides L.; Kuhnia fitzpatrickii Nelson; Kuhnia fulva Raf.; Kuhnia glabra Raf.; Kuhnia glomerata Raf.; Kuhnia glutinosa Elliott; Kuhnia gooddingii Nelson; Kuhnia jacobaea Lunell; Kuhnia latifolia Raf.; Kuhnia macrantha Buckley; Kuhnia maximiliani Sinning; Kuhnia media Raf.; Kuhnia paniculata Cass.; Kuhnia pubescens Raf.; Kuhnia reticulata Nelson; Kuhnia suaveolens Fresen.; Kuhnia tuberosa Raf.; Kuhnia virgata Raf.; Brickellia chlorolepis (Wooton & Standl.) Shinners, syn of var. chlorolepis; Kuhnia microphylla Shinners, syn of var. chlorolepis; Brickellia schaffneri (A.Gray) Shinners, syn of var. chlorolepis; Kuhnia chlorolepis Wooton & Standl., syn of var. chlorolepis; Kuhnia hitchcocki Nelson, syn of var. corymbulosa; Kuhnia hitchcockii Nelson, syn of var. corymbulosa; Brickellia mosieri (Small) Shinners, syn of var. floridana

= Brickellia eupatorioides =

Species of flowering plant

Brickellia eupatorioides, or false boneset, is a North American species of flowering plants in the family Asteraceae. It is widespread in Mexico from Chihuahua to Oaxaca, and in all regions of the contiguous United States except New England, New York, and the West Coast.

Brickellia eupatorioides is a perennial up to 200 cm (80 inches) tall, growing from a woody base. It produces many small flower heads with yellow, lavender, or maroon disc florets but no ray florets.

Varieties

- Brickellia eupatorioides var. chlorolepis (Wooton & Standley) B. L. Turner - Mexico, southwestern USA
- Brickellia eupatorioides var. corymbulosa (Torr. & A.Gray) Shinners - Great Plains, Mississippi Valley
- Brickellia eupatorioides var. eupatorioides - eastern USA
- Brickellia eupatorioides var. floridana (R.W.Long) B.L.Turner - southern Florida
- Brickellia eupatorioides var. gracillima (A.Gray) B.L.Turner - Ark., Mo., Okla., Tex.
- Brickellia eupatorioides var. texana (Shinners) Shinners - Ark., Kans., Mo., Okla., Tex

== Ecology ==
B. eupatorioides is commonly found in grassland communities. It is fire tolerant and persists through repeated annual burns, potentially becoming more frequent over time with repeated summer burns.
