= Darryl Roberson =

US Air Force general

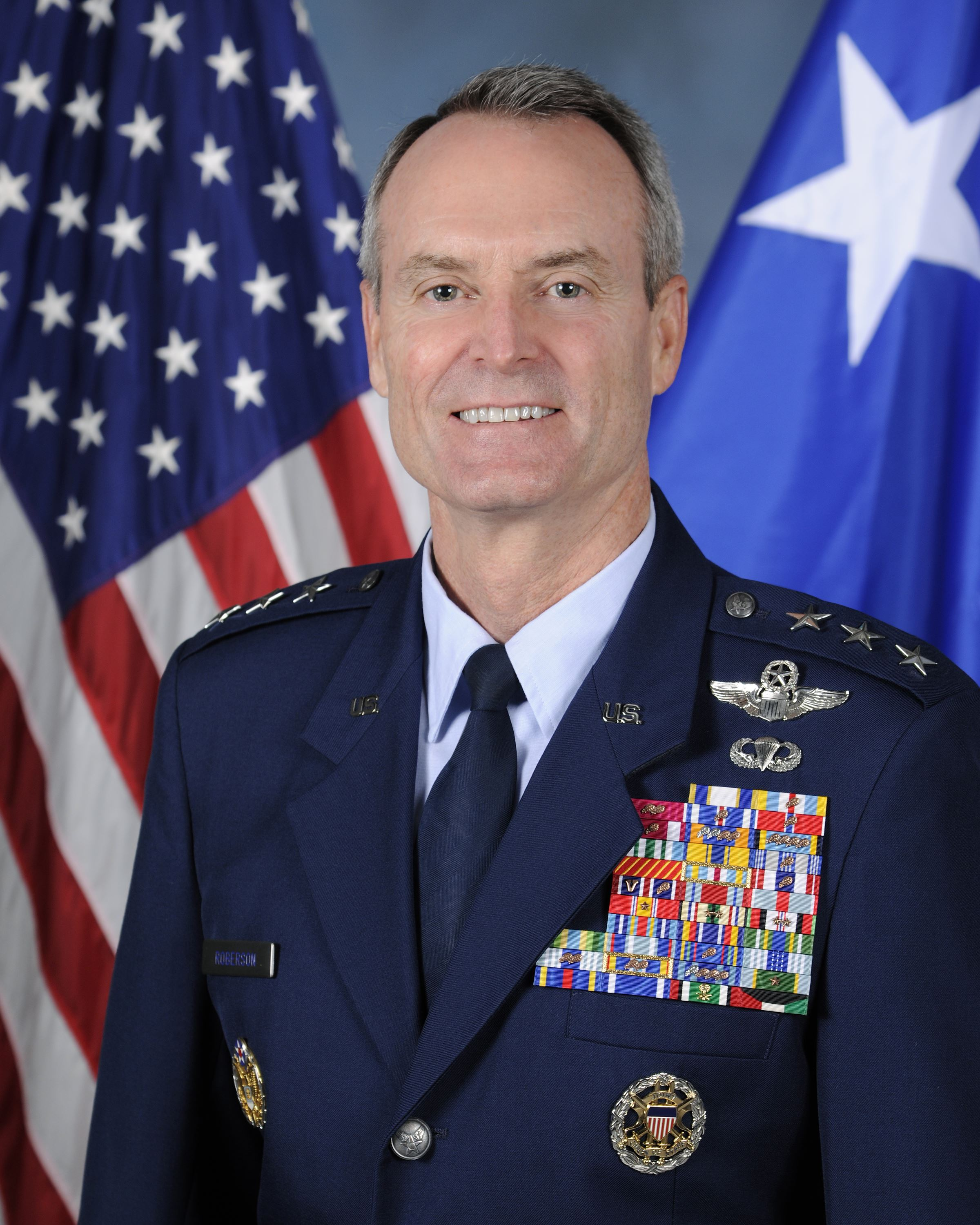
- Born: March 3, 1960 (age 66)
- Military career
- Allegiance: United States
- Branch: United States Air Force
- Service years: 1983–2017
- Rank: Lieutenant General
- Commands: Air Education and Training Command; Third Air Force; Seventeenth Expeditionary Air Force; 455th Air Expeditionary Wing; 325th Fighter Wing; 52nd Fighter Wing; 4th Operations Group; 90th Fighter Squadron
- Conflicts: Gulf War; War in Afghanistan
- Awards: Air Force Distinguished Service Medal; Defense Superior Service Medal (2); Legion of Merit (3); Distinguished Flying Cross; Bronze Star Medal (2)

Darryl Lee Roberson (born March 3, 1960) is a retired United States Air Force lieutenant general who served as the commander of Air Education and Training Command from July 2015 to November 2017. He previously served as commander of Third Air Force and the 17th Expeditionary Air Force at Ramstein Air Base, Germany.

Roberson is a graduate of the United States Air Force Academy and Euro-NATO Joint Jet pilot training. He has been a Thunderbird air demonstration pilot, a Congressional Fellow on Capitol Hill and has served on the Air Staff and Joint Staff at the Pentagon. He commanded at the squadron and group levels, and served as the Commander 52nd Fighter Wing, Spangdahlem Air Base in Germany, 325th Fighter Wing, Tyndall Air Force Base, Florida, and 455th Air Expeditionary Wing, Bagram, Afghanistan. He flew combat missions in Iraq during operations Desert Storm and Iraqi Freedom as well as in Afghanistan during Operation Enduring Freedom.

Roberson is a command pilot who has around 5,400 flight hours including 869 combat hours. He has flown the F-4, F-15, F-16 and F-22.

== Awards and decorations ==
| US Air Force Command Pilot Badge |
| Basic Parachutist Badge |
| Office of the Joint Chiefs of Staff Identification Badge |
| Headquarters Air Force Badge |

| Air Force Distinguished Service Medal |
| Defense Superior Service Medal with one bronze oak leaf cluster |
| Legion of Merit with two bronze oak leaf clusters |
| Distinguished Flying Cross with one bronze oak leaf cluster |
| Bronze Star Medal with one bronze oak leaf cluster |
| Meritorious Service Medal with one bronze oak leaf cluster |
| Air Medal with two silver and two bronze oak leaf clusters |
| Aerial Achievement Medal with four bronze oak leaf clusters |
| Joint Service Commendation Medal |
| Air Force Commendation Medal |
| Air Force Achievement Medal with one bronze oak leaf cluster |
| Air Force Combat Action Medal |
| Joint Meritorious Unit Award |
| Air Force Meritorious Unit Award with one bronze oak leaf cluster |
| Air Force Outstanding Unit Award with "V" Device and one bronze oak leaf cluster |
| Combat Readiness Medal |
| Air Force Recognition Ribbon |
| National Defense Service Medal with one bronze service star |
| Southwest Asia Service Medal with two bronze service stars |
| Afghanistan Campaign Medal with two bronze service stars |
| Global War on Terrorism Expeditionary Medal |
| Global War on Terrorism Service Medal |
| Korea Defense Service Medal |
| Armed Forces Service Medal |
| Air and Space Campaign Medal |
| Nuclear Deterrence Operations Service Medal with one bronze oak leaf cluster |
| Air Force Overseas Short Tour Service Ribbon |
| Air Force Overseas Long Tour Service Ribbon with two oak leaf clusters |
| Air Force Expeditionary Service Ribbon with gold frame and two bronze oak leaf clusters |
| Air Force Longevity Service Award with one silver and three bronze oak leaf clusters |
| Small Arms Expert Marksmanship Ribbon with one bronze service star |
| Air Force Training Ribbon |
| Polish Silver Star |
| NATO Medal for Former Yugoslavia |
| Kuwait Liberation Medal (Saudi Arabia) |
| Kuwait Liberation Medal (Kuwait) |

Military offices
| Preceded by Carlton D. Everhart II | Commander, Third Air Force; 2014–2015 | Succeeded by Timothy Ray |
| Preceded by Robin Rand | Commander, Air Education and Training Command; 2015–2017 | Succeeded by Steven L. Kwast |
