= Stephen Twitty =

Senior American army officer

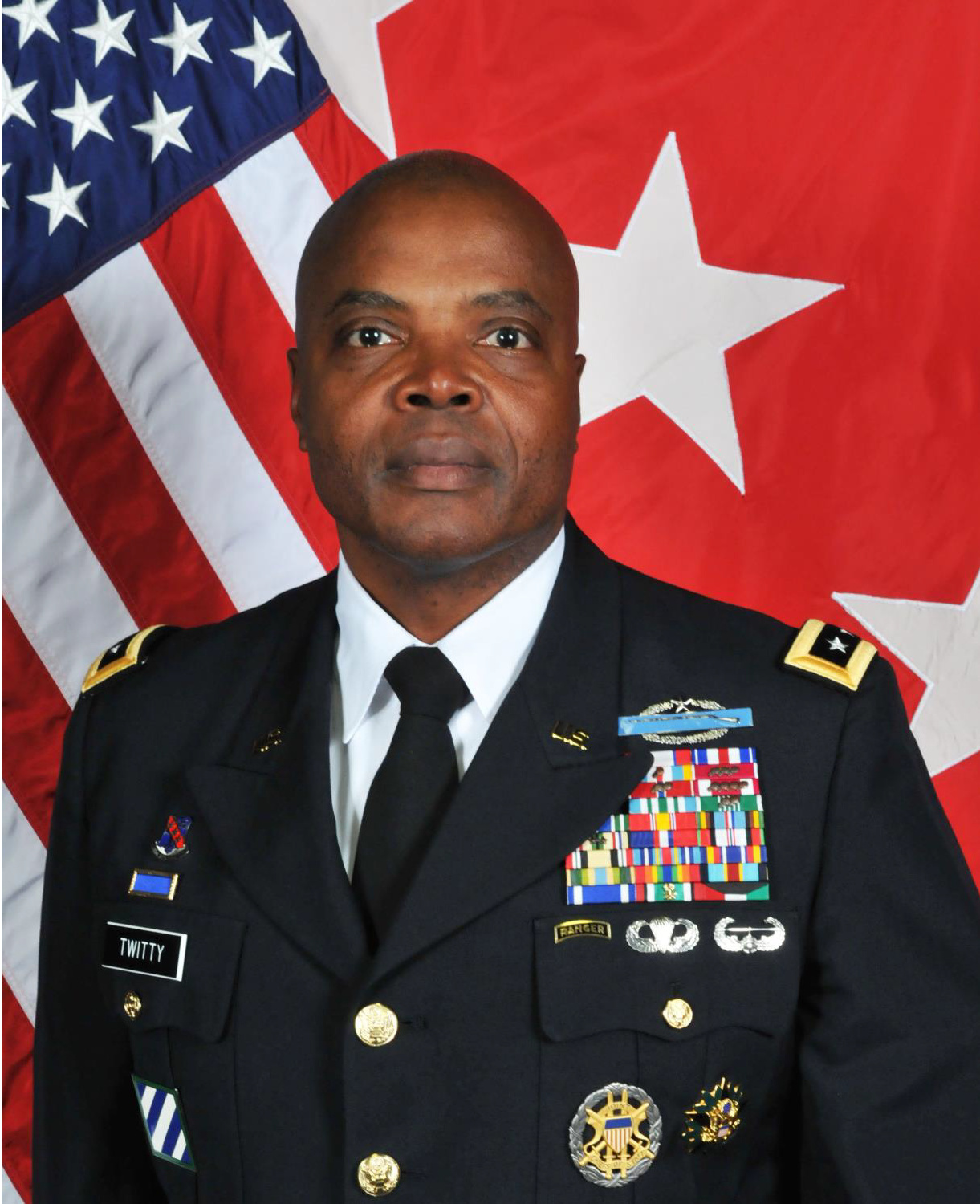
- Born: 1963 (age 62–63); Spartanburg, South Carolina, U.S.
- Military career
- Allegiance: United States
- Branch: United States Army
- Service years: 1985–2020
- Rank: Lieutenant General
- Commands: First United States Army; 1st Armored Division; 4th Brigade Combat Team, 1st Cavalry Division; 3rd Battalion, 15th Infantry Regiment
- Conflicts: Gulf War; War in Afghanistan; Iraq War
- Awards: Army Distinguished Service Medal; Silver Star; Defense Superior Service Medal (2); Legion of Merit (4); Bronze Star Medal (3)

Stephen M. Twitty (/ˈstɛfɛn/ STeF-en; (born 1963) is a retired lieutenant general in the United States Army. Twitty assumed command of First United States Army on July 15, 2016, relinquishing command to become deputy commander of United States European Command on 9 August 2018. Previously, he was commanding general of Fort Bliss and the 1st Armored Division. Twitty was awarded the Silver Star during Operation Iraqi Freedom. Noted for his relationship with journalist David Bloom, who was embedded with his battalion during the invasion of Iraq in 2003, Twitty has served in five combat deployments, including tours in the Gulf War, Afghanistan, Iraq, and Kuwait. He has commanded at the company, battalion, and brigade level during the wars in Iraq and Afghanistan. Twitty is a graduate of South Carolina State University and a member of the Omega Psi Phi fraternity. He was inducted into the South Carolina State University ROTC Hall of Fame in 2009, and selected as one of the university's Distinguished Alumni in 2004.

Twitty has a highway named in his honor, State Highway 11, running through his hometown of Chesnee, South Carolina.

== Early life and education ==
Born in Spartanburg, South Carolina, Twitty is a native of Chesnee, South Carolina. He is a 1985 distinguished military graduate from South Carolina State University. Twitty also holds a Master of Science degree in Public Administration from Central Michigan University and a Master of Science in National Security Strategy from the National Defense University.

== Military career ==
Twitty is an infantryman; his duty assignments include rifle platoon leader, scout platoon leader and battalion S-3 air officer from August 1985 to May 1989 with 1st Battalion, 327th Infantry Regiment, 101st Airborne (Air Assault) Division at Fort Campbell. From October 1989 to May 1993, he served as the S-3 air officer for 3rd Battalion, 7th Infantry Regiment during Operation Desert Storm; Aide-de-camp to the commanding general; and, commander of B Company, 3rd Battalion, 15th Infantry Regiment, 24th Infantry Division at Fort Stewart, Georgia.

From May 1993 to 1994, Twitty served as a Joint Chiefs of Staff Intern in the Directorate for Strategic Plans and Policy (J-5) in the Pentagon; and, from 1994 to 1995 he served as the speechwriter for the Army G-3. After completion of Command and General Staff College, he served as a G-3 operations officer with V Corps from June 1996 to April 1997 in Heidelberg, Germany, to include Operation Joint Endeavor in Tazar, Hungary. From April 1997 to June 1999, he served in Schweinfurt, Germany as the executive officer for 1st Battalion, 26th Infantry Regiment, and the operations officer (S3) for 2nd Brigade, 1st Infantry Division.

From June 1999 to June 2001, Twitty served in Mons, Belgium at Supreme Headquarters Allied Powers Europe as the aide-de-camp to the Supreme Allied Commander Europe (SACEUR) and commander United States European Command, including during Operation Allied Response in Kosovo.

From June 2001 to June 2003, Twitty commanded 3rd Battalion, 15th Infantry Regiment, ("3–15") including during Operation Iraqi Freedom. His battalion (Task Force 3–15) was awarded the Presidential Unit Citation. From June 2003 to June 2004, he served as operations officer (G-3) for 3rd Infantry Division, Fort Stewart, Georgia. At Fort Bliss, he commanded 4th Brigade Combat Team, 1st Cavalry Division from August 2005 to March 2008, including during Operation Iraqi Freedom; later reflagged as 4th Brigade Combat Team, 1st Armored Division from March 2008 to July 2008.

From July 2008 to July 2009, Twitty served as the executive officer to the deputy commanding general of U.S. Northern Command in Colorado Springs, Colorado. From July 2009 to September 2010, he served as the chief of staff, United States Army Central, Operation Iraqi Freedom. From September 2010 through March 2012, he served as the deputy commanding general (operations) for the 1st Armored Division at Ft. Bliss. From March 2012 to April 2013, Twitty served as the Deputy Chief of Staff for Strategic Communication, International Security Assistance Force (ISAF), Operation Enduring Freedom, Afghanistan.

Twitty served as the Deputy Chief of Staff for Operations for United States Army Forces Command at Fort Bragg, North Carolina. Twitty leaves First Army to serve as deputy commander of EUCOM on 9 August 2018.

== Later career ==
Twitty founded consulting firm Twitty and Associates LLC. Twitty serves in a number of senior business positions including as board director at Karman, Space and Defense, Palladyne AI, Weibel Scientific, and Meroxa. He is a Board Advisor at AI company Dataminr and robotics company Sarcos. He is a National Security and Military Analyst at MSNBC.

== Awards and decorations ==
- Combat Infantryman Badge (2nd award)
- Expert Infantryman Badge
- Ranger Tab
- Basic Parachutist Badge
- Air Assault Badge
- Office of the Joint Chiefs of Staff Identification Badge
- Army Staff Identification Badge
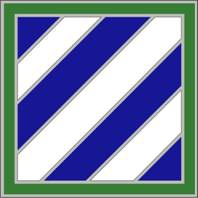
- 3rd Infantry Division Combat Service Identification Badge
- United States European Command Badge
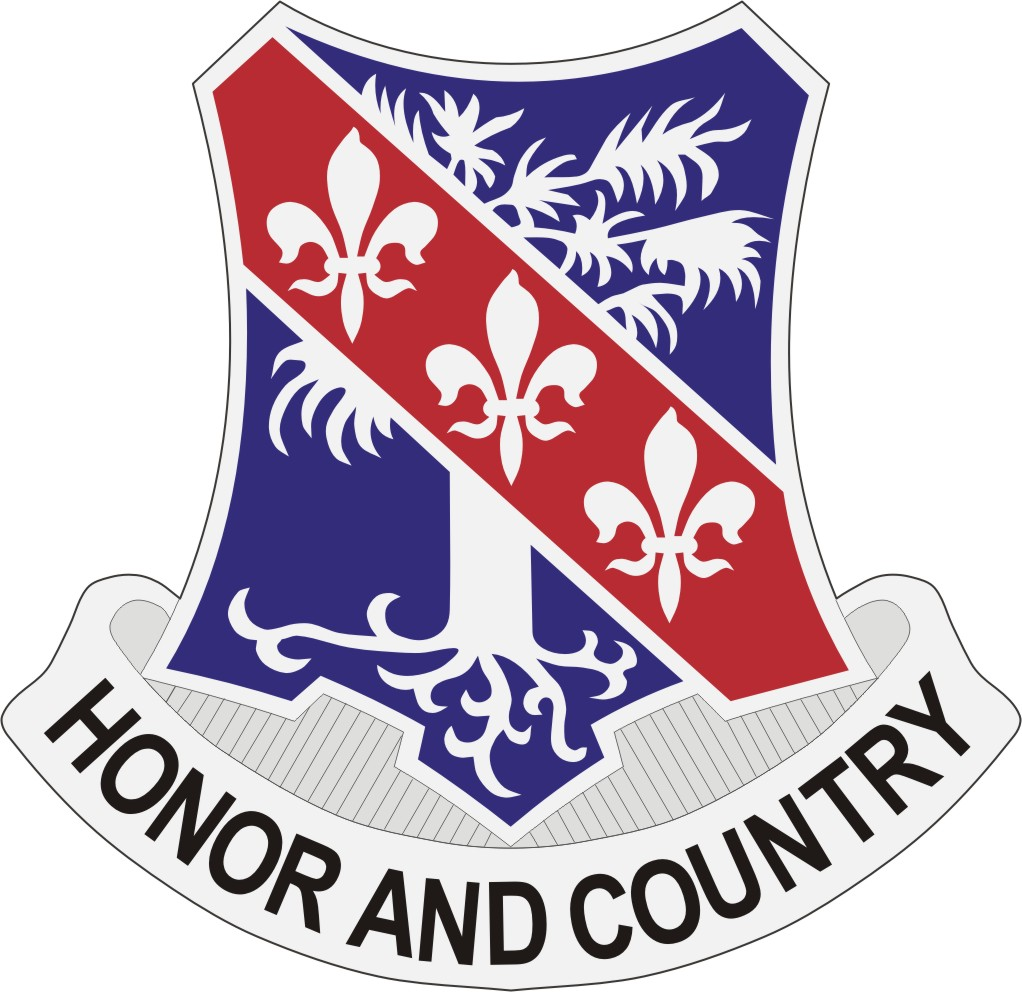
- 327th Infantry Regiment Distinctive Unit Insignia
- 10 Overseas Service Bars
- Army Distinguished Service Medal
- Silver Star
- Defense Superior Service Medal (1 OLC)
- Legion of Merit (3 OLC)
- Bronze Star (2 OLC)
- Meritorious Service Medal (4 OLC)
- Joint Service Commendation Medal
- Army Commendation Medal (2 OLC)
- Army Achievement Medal (1 OLC)
- Army Presidential Unit Citation
- National Defense Service Medal (with 1 Service Star)
- Armed Forces Expeditionary Medal
- Southwest Asia Service Medal (with 2 service stars)
- Kosovo Campaign Medal
- Afghanistan Campaign Medal
- Iraq Campaign Medal
- Global War on Terrorism Expeditionary Medal
- Global War on Terrorism Service Medal
- Armed Forces Service Medal
- Army Service Ribbon
- Army Overseas Service Ribbon (with bronze award numeral "6")
- NATO Medal for the former Yugoslavia
- Kuwait Liberation Medal (Saudi Arabia)
- Kuwait Liberation Medal (Kuwait)

== Personal life ==
Twitty is married to Karen Wilson Twitty and has two daughters.

Upon relinquishing command of First Army, Twitty noted that his grandfathers had served in First Army, in a segregated military, and that First Army's centenary would be 100 years, on the next day, 10 August 2018.

Military offices
Preceded by Timothy Ray	Deputy Commander of the United States European Command; 2018–2020	Succeeded by Michael L. Howard
