= Jonathan D. George =

U.S. Air Force General

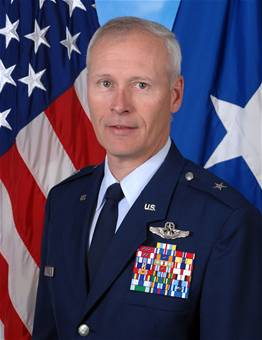
- U.S. Air Force Photo
- Born: Indiana
- Military career
- Allegiance: United States
- Branch: United States Air Force
- Service years: 1981–2011
- Rank: Brigadier General
- Commands: 55th Wing; 7th Bomb Wing; 509th Operations Group; 393rd Bomb Squadron
- Conflicts: Operation Enduring Freedom
- Awards: Defense Superior Service Medal; Legion of Merit; Distinguished Flying Cross; Bronze Star; Air Medal

Brig. Gen. Jonathan D. George served in a variety of military and government positions. These include Director of Strategic Capabilities Policy, a member of the National Security Council, and as a national security adviser to the President from March 2009 until February 2011.

In the May 2012 primary, George unsuccessfully sought the Democratic nomination for Congressman in Indiana's 9th Congressional district.

== Early life and education ==
George was raised on a farm near Bedford Indiana, playing a variety of sports in high school. He is a direct relative of Comanche Chief Quanah Parker, and as such is a member of the Comanche Nation. George lived out of his truck while saving up money for his own farm in the early 1980s.

George received his bachelor's degree in agronomy and education from Southern Illinois University Carbondale in 1979. He went on to receive a master's degree in public administration from Harvard University in 1990.

He served as a White House Fellow during the Ronald Reagan Administration in the Department of Agriculture.

== Air Force ==
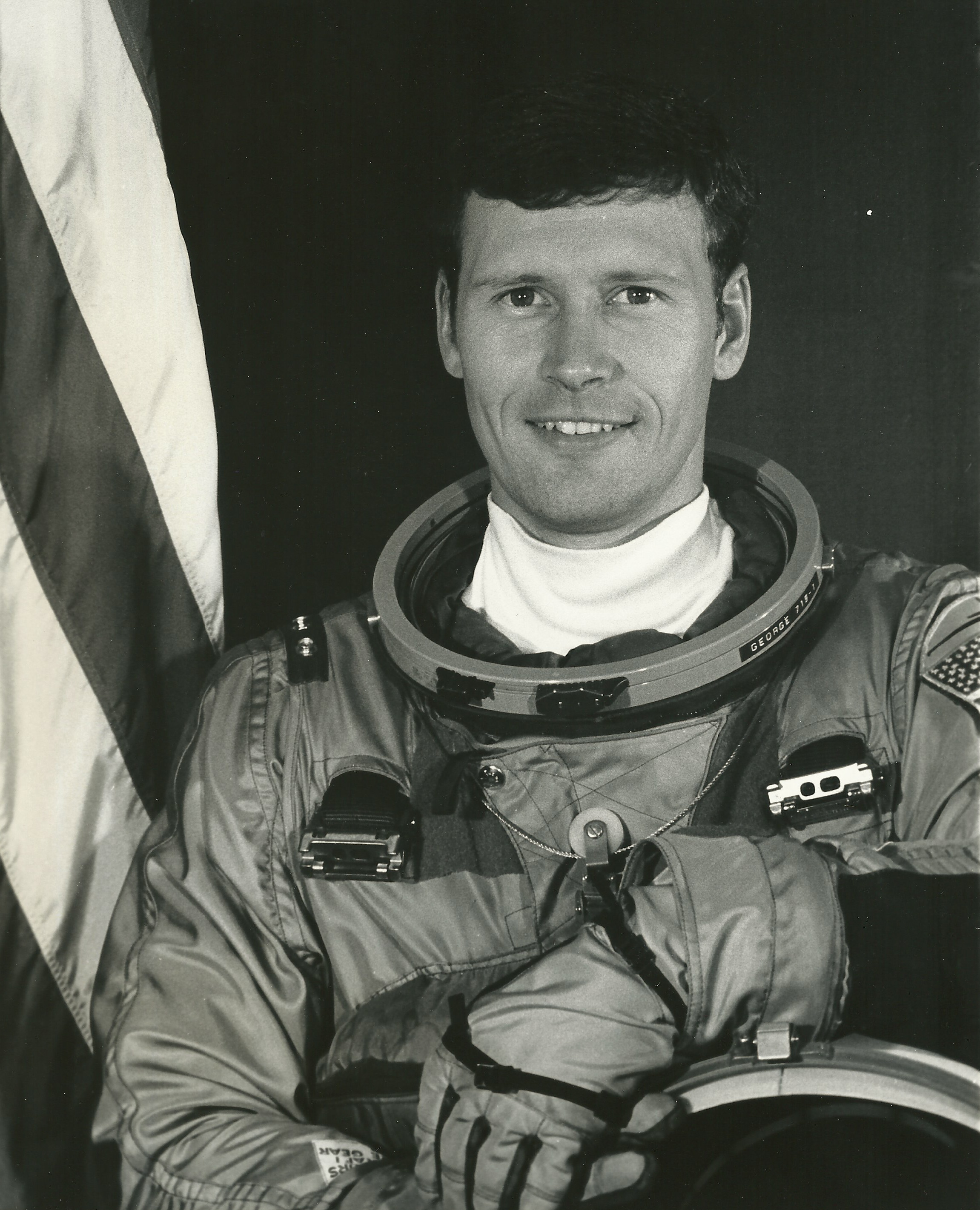
U.S. Air Force Photo - Captain Jonathan D. George, U-2 pilot

George stated that he joined the air force because of the Iranian Hostage Crisis. George became a commissioned officer in 1981 and served as a command pilot accumulating more than 4,000 flying hours. He flew in classified U-2 spy planes during his career.

He was promoted to Brigadier General in 2006, managing over 12,000 personal and a budget of $US3 billion before turning down the promotion of major general before his retirement.

During his military career, he rose to become a prominent officer who helped to lead transition assistance issues in Afghanistan. He also served on the National Security Council staff as an advisor on key strategic policy issues to President Barack Obama.

In the Air Force he was awarded several awards for acts of bravery, including his saving of a disabled U-2 plane while risking his own life. He retired from the military in February 2011 and returned to Indiana.

=== 2012 Congressional campaign ===
In October 2011 George, a Democrat, announced his bid for Indiana's 9th District Democratic Congressional primary. He was opposed by John W. Tilford of Bloomington, Robert Winningham of Charlestown, John Griffin Miller of Corydon, and Shelli Yoder of Bloomington.

George lost the primary to Shelli Yoder, who in turn lost to incumbent Congressman Todd Young in the general election in the newly redrawn 9th Congressional district.

== Personal ==
George lives on a farm in Bedford, Indiana with his wife and children.

In the 2024 United States presidential election, George endorsed Kamala Harris.
