= Brickellia mosieri =

Conservation status
- Endangered (ESA)

Scientific classification
- Kingdom: Plantae
- Clade: Tracheophytes
- Clade: Angiosperms
- Clade: Eudicots
- Clade: Asterids
- Order: Asterales
- Family: Asteraceae
- Genus: Brickellia
- Species: B. mosieri

Binomial name
- Brickellia mosieri (L.) Shinners

Species of flowering plant

Brickellia mosieri, the Florida brickell-bush, is a North American herbaceous plant in the family Asteraceae. It grows in Pine Rocklands in Florida, preferring low-nutrient sand close to sea level. It is characterized by small, round, rod-shaped flowers that are either brown or white. Since 1999, the total population of the Florida brickell-bush has declined by 50% due to a number of threats. Currently, it is listed as "endangered wherever found" under the ESA (Endangered Species Act)

== Description ==
Florida brickell-bush (Brickellia mosieri) is classified as an herb, meaning it does not have any woody structures above ground. On average adult plants grow between 30.5 – 107 cm (1-3.5 feet) tall. The stalk of the Florida brickell-bush is thin, branched and erect with leaves growing on alternating sides of the main stalk. Leaves are narrow in width, plump and 1 – 3 cm (0.4-1.2 inch) in length. The edges of leaves are either slightly or entirely serrated. Leaves typically have small, amber-colored dots. Flowers are white or brown, rod-shaped and arranged circularly around the stalk. The plant does not have typical flat flowers (see life history).

For images, please see "MOSIER'S BRICKELL-BUSH" in references.

== Life history ==
The Florida brickell-bush (Brickellia mosieri) is present during all seasons (perennial) and has a long lifespan. There is no information on the exact life expectancy of the plant. Reproduction occurs through pollination during an annual flowering period between August and October, though the flowering period may be year-round. Seeds are typically carried away from the parent plant by wind, though animals likely also play a role.

Flower petals are arranged in a symmetric circle around the end of stalks. The Florida brickell-bush does not have typically flattened petals (ray flowers), instead their flower petals have a rod-like shape. Typically, flowers are white but can sometimes be brown. The surrounding bracts are hairy and slightly ribbed.

In general, plants with seeds that are resistant to being dried out and frozen can be protected easier since their seeds may be stored for longer periods of time when frozen. This allows the plant to be re-established from seeds. A study assessing dry and frost resistant qualities in various plants found that the seeds of the Florida brickell-bush cannot survive the drying process required to safely freeze plant seeds. Drying is required to prevent the formation of ice crystals during the freezing process, since ice crystals damage seeds. This makes it impossible to safely freeze the seeds of the Florida brickell-bush for long-term storage.

No information is available on the age of sexual maturity, growth rate, or exact seed characteristics of the Florida brickell-bush.

== Ecology ==
=== Diet ===
The Florida brickell-bush is a plant and as such it is autotrophic and photosynthesizes to produce glucose (a type of sugar) that is used for nutrition. It needs the same essential nutrients in soil that most other plants need. This includes nitrogen, phosphorus, potassium, magnesium, sulfur, and calcium.

=== Pollinators ===
The Florida brickell-bush reproduces sexually (i.e. through pollination). The exact insect species which pollinate the Florida brickell-bush are unknown. Current theories have identified potential pollinators as native bees and butterflies. Bees are suspected to pollinate the Florida brickell-bush as they are important in pollinating other plants in Pine Rocklands where the Florida brickell-bush is found. Several species of butterflies are suspected as pollinators due to the shape of the Florida brickell-bush's flowers, which are suitable for pollination by bees, butterflies, or both

=== Habitat ===
The Florida brickell-bush is known to grow in low-nutrient sand close to sea level. This type of species requires wildfires to occur to keep the ground level vegetation alive. These wildfires occur at the beginning of the wet spring season and early summer. The Florida brickell-bush also benefits from the fires, which stop other plant species from growing in the same area and taking over. The fires prevent the elimination of this plant and are needed to burn trash and organic litter (leaves and other plants) to keep the area clean. The Florida brickell-bush is found in the Pine Rocklands with minimal disturbance. A study found that this plant grows in open shrub canopies which allow sunlight to reach this species.

=== Range ===
The Florida brickell-bush is found in the southeast region of the US, specifically Florida. The two counties it occurs in are Miami-Dade and Monroe County. It is mainly endemic to Pine Rocklands, found on the Miami Rock Ridge in central and southern Miami-Dade County - right outside of the everglades national park. Currently, the Florida brickell-bush ranges from approximately Kendall to Florida City. It is believed to occur at 17 different sites, with an additional 5 sites where it possibly occurs.

For a range map please see "Florida brickell-bush (Brickellia mosieri)" in references.

== Conservation ==
=== Population size ===
There has been a great decline in the population size of the Florida brickell-bush which has led to it being listed as endangered. Because of the difficulty of surveying the amount of plants found, there is room for uncertainty. This is due to the Florida brickell-bush being hard to distinguish when not flowered. The largest population size found in 1999 was in the Larry and Penny Thompson Park. In 2008 approximately 5,000 to 7,000 plants were found at this park. In 2011, in Miami-Dade County, approximately 31 to 45 plants were last found. The total population in 2013 was between 2,150 and 3,700 plants. This population has reduced about 50% or more since 1999, and continues to decline.

=== Past/current geographical distribution ===
The Florida brickell-bush was always found solely in Florida; however, it used to span far more of Florida. In the past, it grew in the further north of Florida, ranging from approximately Coconut Grove to Florida City. This range has unfortunately diminished more than 30%. Currently it only ranges from Kendall to Florida City. According to ECOS (Environmental Conservation Online System), the total population of the Florida brickell-bush has declined by 50% since 1999, leading to the decision to list it as endangered.

=== Threats ===
The primary threats to the Florida brickell-bush are habitat destruction, fragmentation, and modification due to development, fire suppression, invasive plants, and sea level rise.

Sea level rise is a significant threat to the Florida brickell-bush, as large areas of coastal and low-lying South Florida (where it is found) are predicted to flood, be lost to sea level rise in the next 100 years and become more vulnerable to storms. Sea level rising will damage and destroy coastal habitat and modify areas like Pine Rocklands where the Florida brickell-bush grows, causing catastrophic results for this plant.

Additionally, because the Florida brickell-bush has such a small population and such a limited range in Florida, it is extremely threatened by habitat destruction, modification, or fragmentation - whether this is through human development, poor fire management, or sea level rising.

Poor wildfire management greatly affected the Florida brickell-bush in 2014, the year it was listed as endangered - in fact, ECOS found that all occurrences of the species were affected by inadequate wildfire-management. Wildfires are important to the plant's survival, as it prevents other plants from taking over and keep the area clean of organic litter. But inadequate wildfire management can be extremely damaging. It can allow hardwoods to thrive, which then shade the Florida brickell-bush, and damage the Pine Rocklands area where the Florida brickell-bush is found.

The Florida brickell-bush is also threatened by invasive plants. The major plant species threatening it is Neyraudia reynaudiana (Burma reed), which competes with it. Burma reed grows rapidly and shades the Florida brickell-bush plant, posing a threat to its survival. It also monopolizes resources in the area, further damaging the growth of the Florida brickell-bush.

=== Listing under the ESA ===
The Federal Register's final listing rule of the Florida brickell-bush as Endangered occurred October 6, 2014 in Florida. This was first petitioned on May 11, 2004, however, because there was no new information provided, there was no new submission after this date.

=== 5-Year Review ===
The 5-year review is a document assessing the impacts of conservation actions on a species 5 years after it has originally been classified as endangered or threatened under the ESA. No 5-year review is currently available for the Florida brickell-bush. However, a review has been initiated along with 52 other species on June 20, 2019. There are also no delisting documents published for the species, and it remains classified as "endangered wherever found".

=== Species Status Assessments (SSA's) ===
No Species Status Assessments (SSA's) are currently available for this species.

=== Recovery Plan ===
- Critical habitat
  - Listed as 5C in region 4 means that this species faces a high degree of threat with low recovery potential.
  - On October 3, 2013, a proposed critical habitat designation for the Florida brickell-bush was published in the Federal Register. Approximately 1,062 hectares for the Florida brickell-bush in Miami-Dade County, Florida, was designated as critical habitat. The goal is to expand where the plants would be able to live, and reestablish populations into areas where these plants previously occurred. Typically this species does not grow in great abundance.
  - These plants need limestone substrate to provide suitable growing conditions. This combination of ecosystem characteristics occurs only in Pine Rockland habitats.
  - To avoid potential negative impacts, mowing time is critical and should occur after flowering has occurred. Mowing can serve to create and maintain an open canopy.
  - Mechanical control of hardwoods may also help maintain an open canopy in Pine Rockland, but cannot completely replace fire since it does not have the same benefits related to removal of leaf litter and nutrient cycling.

==== Recovery Status Assessment ====
- Biology/ Threats Assessment
  - The Florida brickell-bush is currently under threat from mis-managed wildfires, habitat destruction, habitat modification and fragmentation. Sea level rise also poses a threat due to its close location to the shoreline. Threats are still being discovered for this species.
- Conservation Actions
  - Planned to manage burning of fires
  - Protection of Pine Rocklands from development
  - Restoring and managing Pine Rocklands
  - Restore and create Pine Rockland corridors and stepping stone habitat
  - The Environmentally Endangered Lands (EEL) Covenant Program- introduced to reduce taxes for private landowners of natural forest communities. The purpose of this is to secure land for the preservation of these plants.
  - Institute for Regional Conservation (IRC) - introduced to help restoration and management of private owned Pine Rockland habitats in Miami-Dade County.
  - Pine Rockland Initiative programs- introduced for: creating fires, nonnative plant control, light debris removal, hardwood management, reintroduction of pines where needed, and development of management plans.
  - Fairchild Tropical Botanic Garden (FTBG) - introduced for the "Connect to Protect Network" program with the aim of encouraging citizens to create corridors of healthy Pine Rocklands. They also do research to prevent extinction of this plant.
  - Ex situ conservation is also introduced with the purpose to provide genetic diversity that may disappear in the wild due to threats.

==== Preliminary Recovery Strategy ====
- Recovery Priority Number with Rationale
  - The Florida brickell-bush had a recovery priority of 5 indicating that it faces a high degree of threat with low recovery potential. Absence of fires may prevent the natural reintroduction and decrease the success rate of this species.
- Recovery strategy
  - Five designated critical habitat units have been assigned to this species
  - Protect the known populations of this species within Miami-Dade County. Including habitat restoration efforts with current and past ranges. Working with partners (NOAA, USCG, FTBG, IRC, etc.) for management of this species through restoration activities.
  - Continue to survey to see the progression and research more information
  - Spread awareness to the public
  - Work with the partners in Miami-Dade County to protect remnant patches of Pine Rocklands
  - Provide habitat for the plant's pollinators
