= 7th Bomb Wing =

US Air Force unit

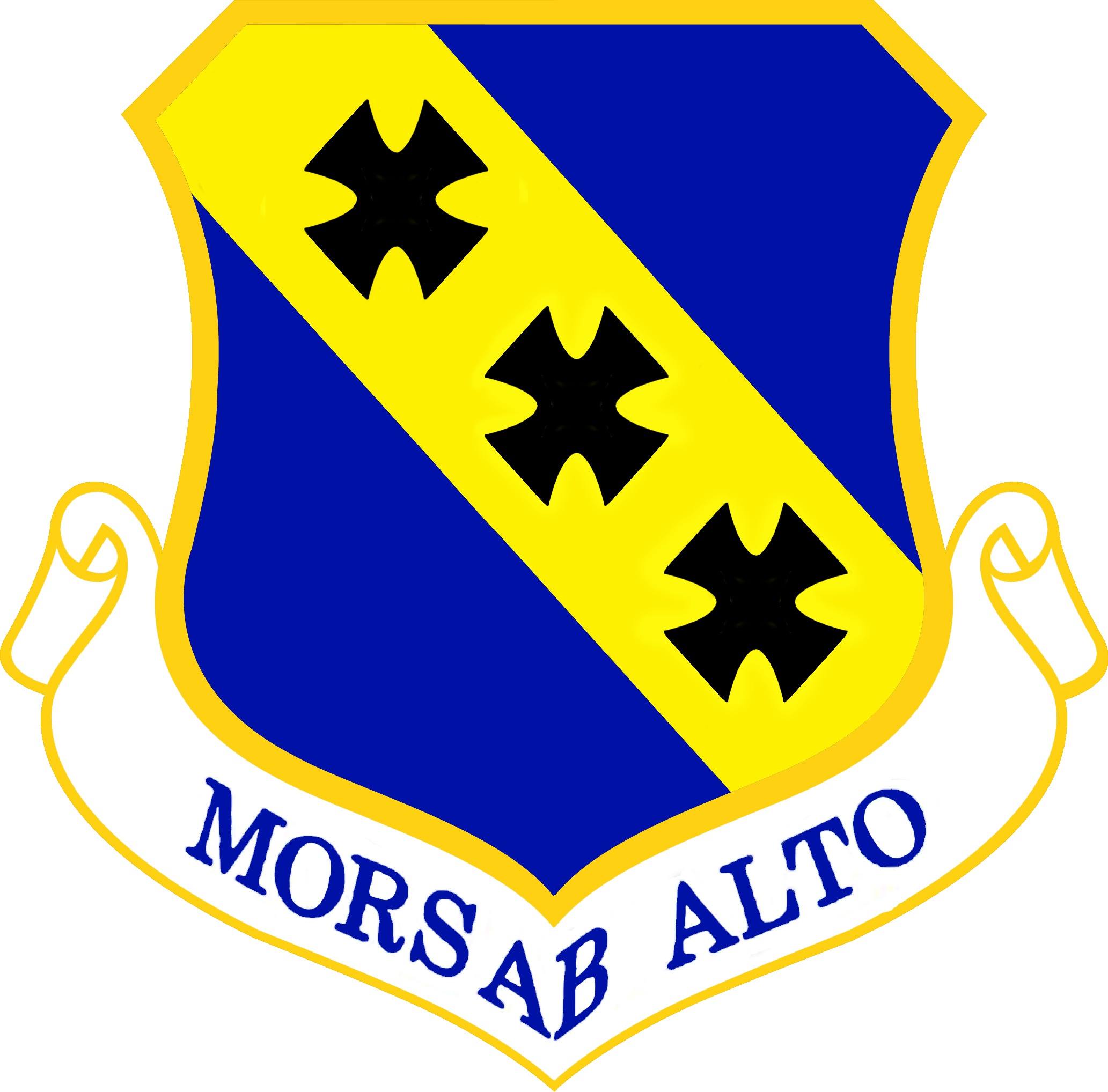
- Shield of the 7th Bomb Wing
- Active: 3 November 1947 – present (78 years, 9 months) Detailed: 1 April 1997 – present (as 7th Bomb Wing) 1 October 1993 – 1 April 1997 (as 7th Wing) 1 June 1992 – 1 October 1993 (as 7th Bomb Wing) 1 September 1991 – 1 June 1992 (as 7th Wing) 1 August 1948 – 1 September 1992 (as 7th Bombardment Wing, Heavy) 3 November 1947 – 1 August 1948 (as 7th Bombardment Wing, Very Heavy)
- Country: United States
- Branch: United States Air Force
- Part of: Eighth Air Force
- Garrison/HQ: Dyess Air Force Base
- Mottos: "MORS AB ALTO"; Latin: Death From Above
- Tailcode: "DY"
- Engagements: Operation Urgent Fury

- Decorations: Air Force Outstanding Unit Award Republic of Vietnam Gallantry Cross

Commanders
- Current commander: Col. Robert W. "Ripper" Sturgill Jr.
- Current vice-commander: Col. Ryan L. Stallsworth
- Current command chief: CCM Benjamin D. McCullough
- Notable commanders: Clarence S. Irvine George J. Eade Wendell L. Griffin Jonathan D. George Garrett Harencak Timothy M. Ray Glen D. VanHerck

Insignia
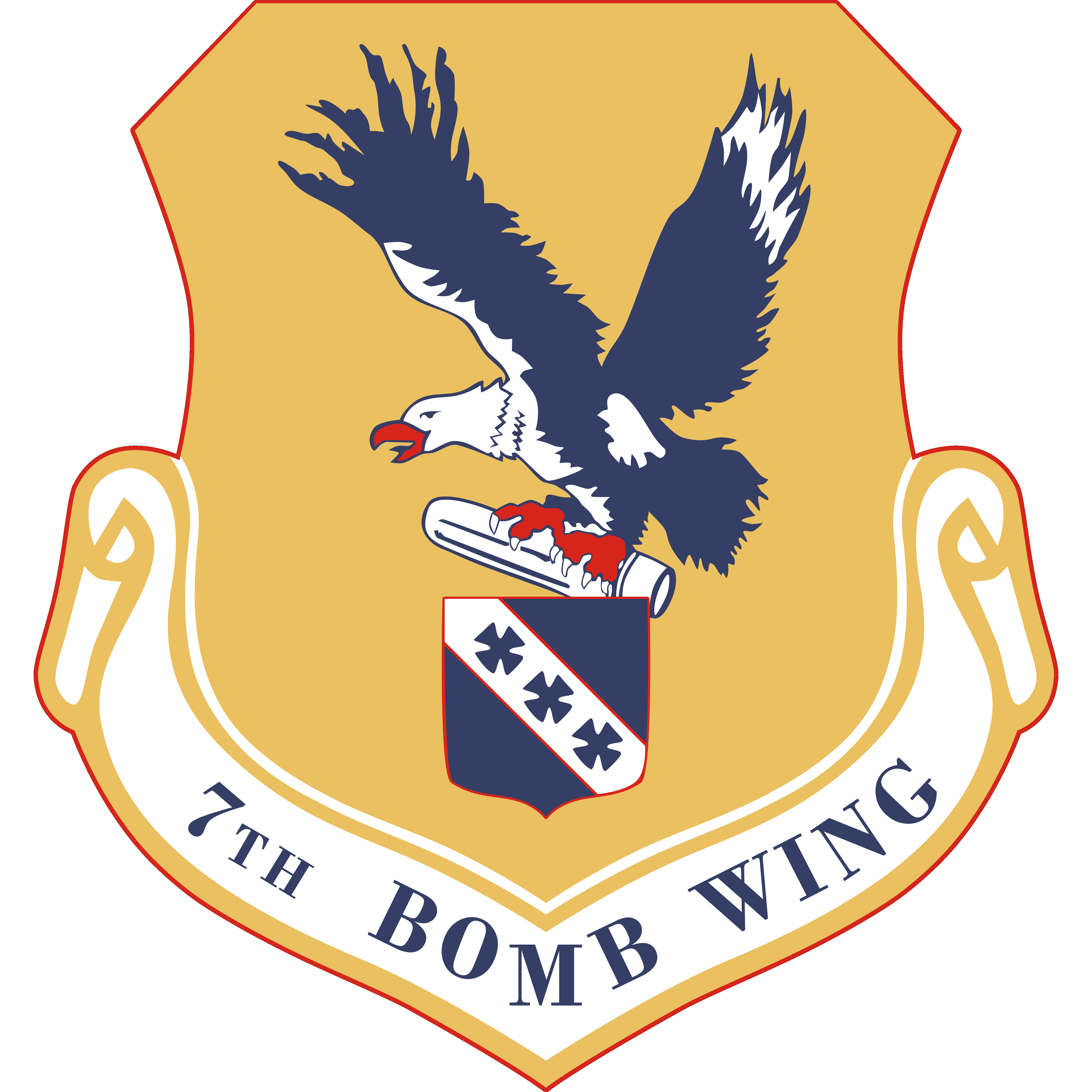
- 7th Bombardment Wing shield (former) (approved 12 September 1952)

Aircraft flown
- Bomber: B-1B

The 7th Bomb Wing (7 BW) is a United States Air Force unit assigned to the Global Strike Command Eighth Air Force. It is stationed at Dyess Air Force Base, Texas, where it is also the host unit.

The 7 BW is one of only two Rockwell B-1B Lancer strategic bombardment wings in the United States Air Force, the other being the 28th Bomb Wing at Ellsworth Air Force Base, South Dakota.

Its origins date to the 1918 establishment of the 1st Army Observation Group (later 7th Bombardment Group), one of the 15 original combat air groups formed by the United States Army before World War II.

The 7th Operations Group carries the lineage and history of its highly decorated World War II predecessor unit. It operated initially in the Philippines as a B-17 Flying Fortress heavy bomber unit assigned to Fifth Air Force but after the fall of the Philippines in early 1942, operated primarily with the Tenth Air Force in India as a B-24 Liberator unit. Active for over 60 years, the 7 BW was a component wing of Strategic Air Command's heavy bomber deterrent force throughout the Cold War.

The 7th Bomb Wing is commanded by Colonel Robert W. "Ripper" Sturgill Jr. Its Vice Commander is Colonel Ryan L. Stallsworth. Its Command Chief is Chief Master Sergeant Benjamin D. McCullough.

== Units ==
- 7th Operations Group

7th Operations Support Squadron
9th Bomb Squadron
28th Bomb Squadron

- 7th Mission Support Group

7th Civil Engineer Squadron
7th Contracting Squadron
7th Communications Squadron
7th Logistics Readiness Squadron
7th Force Support Squadron (formerly 7th Mission Support and 7th Services Squadrons)
7th Security Forces Squadron

- 7th Maintenance Group

7th Aircraft Maintenance Squadron (AMXS)
7th Component Maintenance Squadron (CMS)
7th Equipment Maintenance Squadron (EMS)
7th Munitions Squadron (MUNS)

- 7th Medical Group

7th Medical Support Squadron (MDSS) (Inactivated 22 July 2022)
7th Operational Medicinal Squadron (OMRS)
7th Healthcare Operations Squadron (HCOS)

== History ==
For additional history and lineage information, see 7th Operations Group

=== Cold War ===
==== B-36 era ====
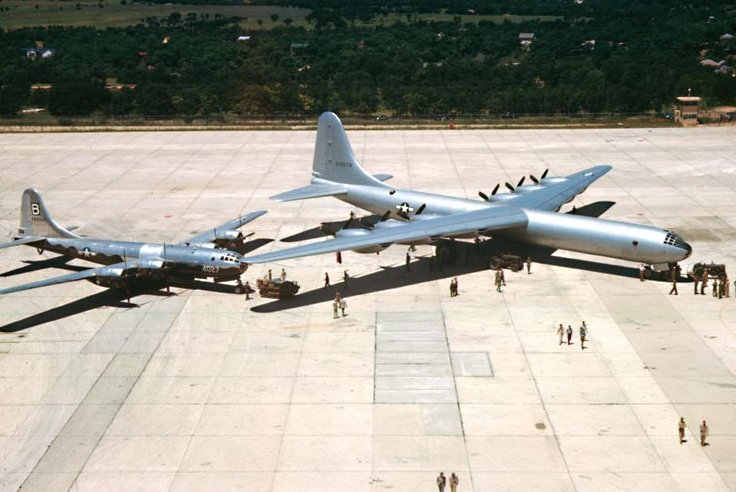
Arrival of the first XB-36 at Carswell AFB (Note: "City of Fort Worth" (AF Serial No. 44-92015)) in June 1948 along with a 7th Bomb Wing B-29.

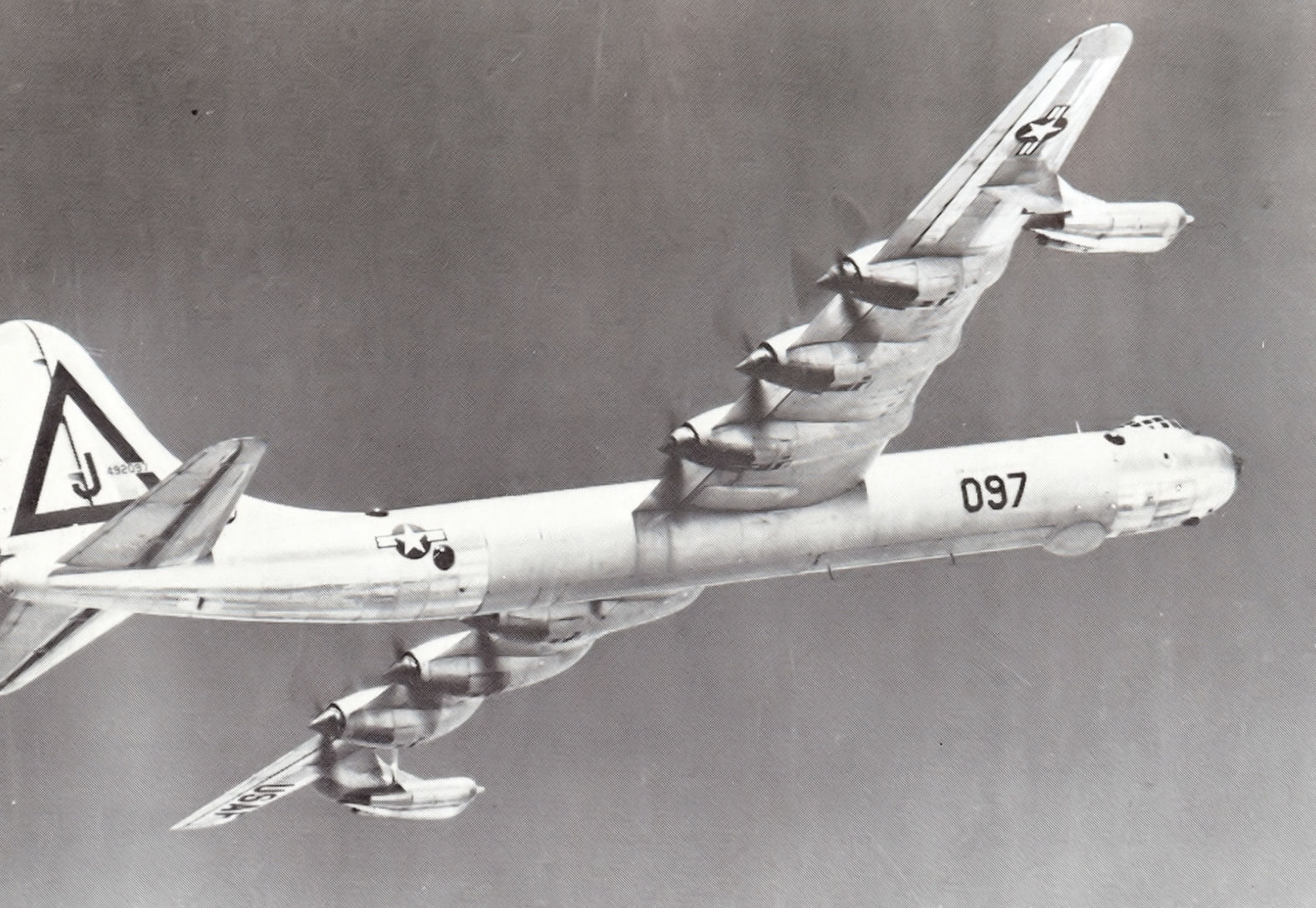
7th Bombardment Wing Consolidated B-36D-1-CF Peacemaker, AF Ser. No. 44-92097, showing Triangle-J tail code, September 1950

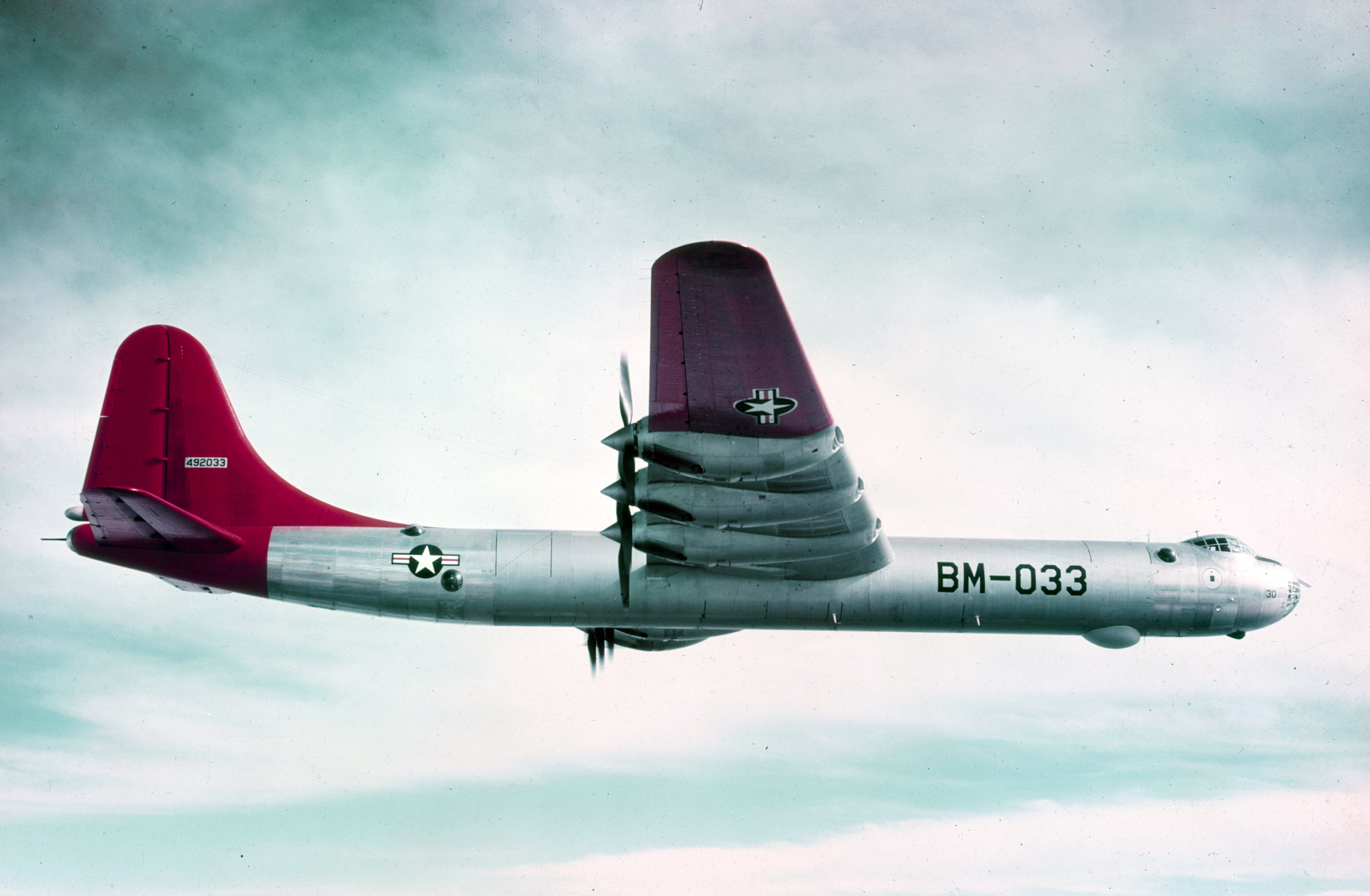
Consolidated B-36B-1-CF Peacemaker, AF Ser. No. 44-92033, in flight

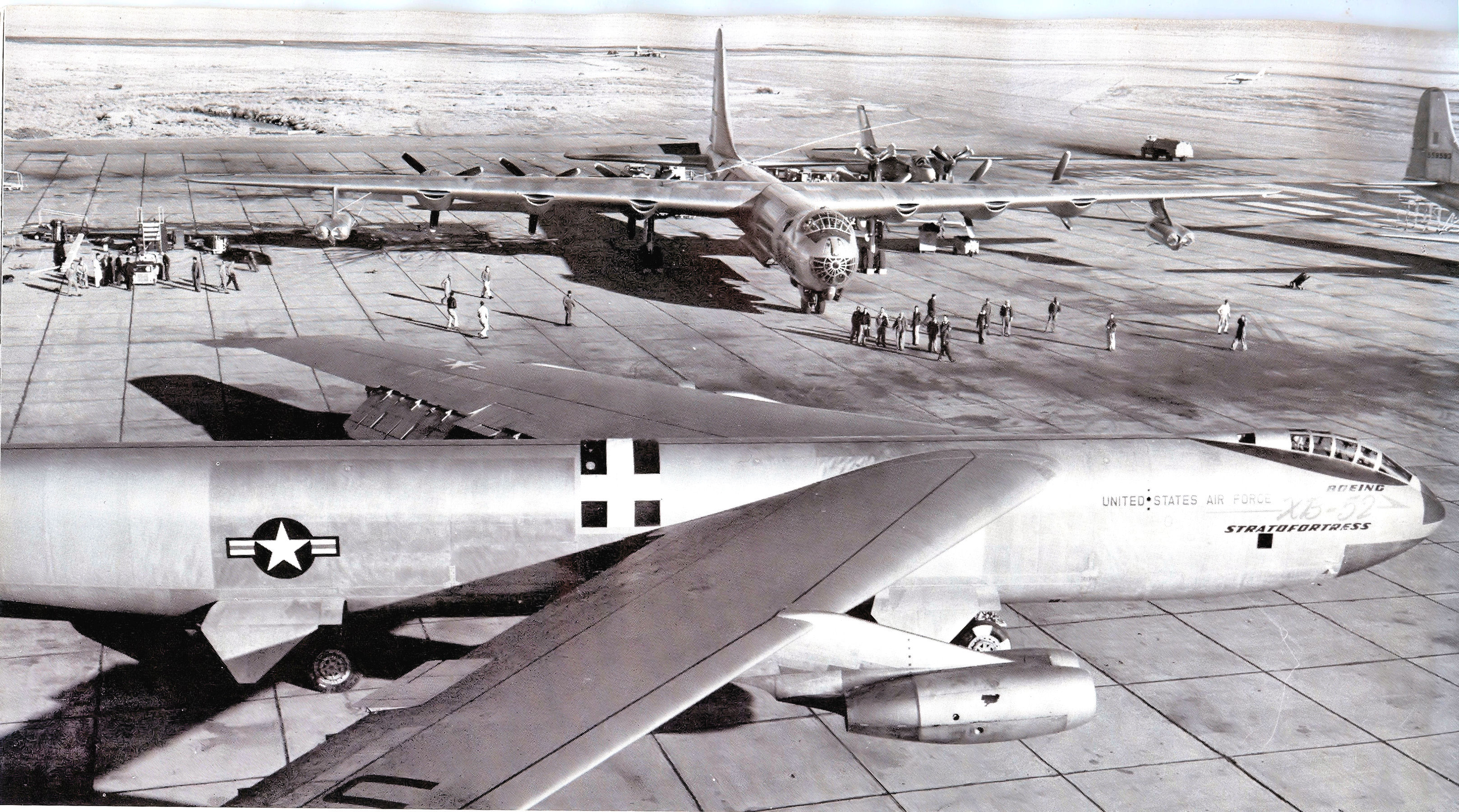
XB-52 prototype bomber at Carswell AFB, 1955 shown with a 7th Bomb Wing B-36

On 17 November 1947, the 7th Bombardment Wing, Very Heavy was organized at Fort Worth Army Air Field, Texas as part of the United States Air Force's wing base reorganization, in which combat groups and all supporting units on a base were assigned to a single wing. The wing mission was to organize and train a force capable of immediate and sustained long range offensive warfare and operations in any part of the world. The 7th Bombardment Group, flying Boeing B-29 Superfortresses became its operational component. The wing's mission was to prepare for global strategic bombardment in the event of hostilities. Under various designations, the 7th Bomb Wing flew a wide variety of aircraft at the base until it moved in 1993.

Starting in June 1948 the wing received the first five Convair B-36A Peacemakers. The B-36As were delivered unarmed and were used for training and crew conversion. (Note: These planes were never operational as bombers. They were converted to RB-36 reconnaissance aircraft. Knaack, p. 21) The first B-36 was designated the "City of Fort Worth" (AF Serial No. 44-92015), and was assigned to the 492d Bombardment Squadron. When the wing base organization was made permanent in 1948, the wing was redesignated as the 7th Bombardment Wing, Heavy on 1 August. In November 1948, B-36B aircraft began to join the B-36As. On 7 December one of the new B-36Bs flew a nonstop simulated bombing mission to Hawaii, dropping a 10,000 lb simulated bombload in the ocean. The flight took over 35 1/2 hours and covered more than 8,000 miles. The wing's last B-29 was transferred on 6 December to the 97th Bombardment Group at Biggs Air Force Base. For 10 years, the "Peacemaker" served as the United States' major deterrent weapons system.

The 11th Bombardment Group was activated on 1 December 1948 with the 26th, 42d, and 98th Bombardment Squadrons, Heavy assigned. The 11th Bomb Group was assigned to Eighth Air Force, but attached to the 7th wing and was also equipped with B-36As for training. A five ship B-36 formation was flown on 15 January 1949, in an air review over Washington, D.C., commemorating the inauguration of the President of the United States, Harry S. Truman.

By December 1950 the wing and its attached groups had 38 B-36s on hand, including several B-36Ds with four General Electric J47 jet engines augmenting its six reciprocating engines and its B-36Bs began to be upgraded to B-36D standard. In January 1951, the 7th took part in a special training mission to the United Kingdom. This was the first flight of B-36s outside the continental United States since the simulated mission to Hawaii. The purpose of the mission was to evaluate the B-36D under simulated war plan conditions. Also, further evaluate the equivalent airspeed and compression tactics for heavy bombardment aircraft. The aircraft, staging through Limestone AFB, Maine, would land at RAF Lakenheath, United Kingdom, following a night radar bombing attack on Helgoland, West Germany. From there the bombers would conduct a simulated bomb run on the Heston Bomb Plot, London, finally landing at[RAF Lakenheath. This was the first deployment of wing and SAC B-36 aircraft to England and Europe. For the next four days the flight flew sorties out of England. The aircraft redeployed to the states on 20 January arriving at Carswell on 21 January.

By September 1952, the B-36s assigned to the 7th Wing and its companion 11th Wing comprised two thirds of SAC's intercontinental bomber force.

On 1 September 1952, what was then thought to be a tornado rolled across the Carswell flight line, with winds over 90 miles per hour recorded at the control tower. By the time it had passed "the flight line was a tangle of airplanes, equipment and pieces of buildings." None of the 82 bombers on the base escaped damage, and SAC declared the entire 19th Air Division at Carswell non-operational. Maintenance personnel of the 7th Wing went on an 84-hour weekly work schedule and began work to restore the least damaged aircraft to operational status. More heavily damaged aircraft were worked on by personnel from the San Antonio Air Materiel Area, where the depot for the B-36 was located. The planes that had been most heavily damaged were towed across the field to the Convair plant where they had been manufactured. Within a month, 51 of the base's Peacemakers had been returned to service and the wing was again declared operational. By May 1953, all but two of the planes had been returned to service. (Note: One plane was written off, another was bailed to Convair to be used for experiments with nuclear power. McGowan, p. 65.)

==== B-52 era ====
On 10 December 1957, the 98th Bomb Squadron was detached from the wing and assigned to the newly activated 4123d Strategic Wing at Carswell. This would become the first Boeing B-52 Stratofortress unit at Carswell. During January 1958, the wing began transferring its B-36 bombers to various SAC wings. On 20 January, the wing transferred all B-52 equipment and property on hand to the 4123d Strategic Wing in order to facilitate that organization's conversion, which was scheduled several months ahead of the 7th Bomb Wing at Carswell. The 7th Bomb Wing officially became a B-52 organization with the adoption of manning documents and equipping authorizations on 1 February 1958.

On 30 May, Memorial Day, the last of the B-36s in the wing were retired with appropriate ceremonies and an "Open House" event on the base. Air Force and civilian personnel of the base, their families, and civilians from surrounding communities were on hand to bid the "Peacemaker" a fond farewell. This last flight of a B-36 completely phased out B-36 operations in the wing.

During the late 1950s and early 1960s, the primary mission of the wing was training in global strategic bombardment and air refueling operations. On 13 April 1965, the 7 BW deployed its forces to Andersen Air Force Base, Guam to support SAC combat operations in Southeast Asia. Most of the wing's bombers and tankers, along with aircrews and some support personnel, were deployed. At Andersen AFB, the wing flew more than 1,300 missions over Vietnam, and returned to Carswell in December 1965.

In 1964 and 1965, the wing's B-52Fs were selected for modification under programs South Bay and Sun Bath. These modifications enabled the wing's bombers to double their bomb load from 24 to 48 750 lb bombs by the installation of external bomb racks. With these modifications, the wing's planes, along with those of the 320th Bombardment Wing at Mather AFB, were the first to deploy to Andersen Air Force Base, Guam and the first to fly Arc Light bombing missions. The modified B-52Fs were the only SAC bombers to deploy for Arc Light missions until 1966, when the B-52Fs were replaced by B-52Ds with the Big Belly modification than enabled them to carry a larger and more varied bomb load.

Later B-52 crews were sent through an intensive two-week course on the B-52D, making them eligible for duty in Southeast Asia. B-52Ds assigned to combat duty in Vietnam were painted in a modified camouflage scheme on the upper surfaces with the undersides, lower fuselage, and both sides of the vertical fin being painted in a glossy black. The USAF serial number was painted in red on the fin over a horizontal red stripe across the length of the fin.

The B-52 effort was concentrated primarily against suspected Viet Cong targets in South Vietnam, but the Ho Chi Minh trail and targets in Laos were also hit. During the relief of Khe Sanh, unbroken waves of six aircraft, attacking every three hours, dropped bombs as close as 900 feet from friendly lines. Cambodia was increasingly bombed by B-52s from March 1969 onward.

By mid-1973 most wing KC-135 resources had redeployed, and most B-52 resources returned by January 1974. The wing resumed nuclear alert status on 3 January 1974. From 4 December 1973 to May 1975, the wing conducted B-52D replacement training, and from January 1974 also conducted B-52D combat crew training, i.e., providing B-52 flight training to novice crews. Beginning in June 1974 the wing also conducted B-52 and KC-135 Central Flight Instructors' courses. Participated in numerous USAF and NATO exercises worldwide. Used B-52s for ocean surveillance and ship identification in joint naval operations.

Wing KC-135 aerial refuelers supported tanker task forces worldwide. In October – November 1983, the wing supported the invasion of Grenada with aerial refueling. In the 1980s the base received several new weapons systems, including modified B-52H aircraft as the B-52D aircraft were retired. In 1983, B-52 crews began training with a new weapon system, the SRAM (Short Range Attack Missile) and later, in 1985, the ALCM (Air Launched Cruise Missile). Also, the wing flew numerous atmospheric sampling missions during 1986 and 1987 in response to the Chernobyl nuclear reactor accident.

Deployed air refueling personnel and equipment to provisional wings in Southwest Asia, August 1990 – February 1992. The wing hosted the first Soviet START (Strategic Arms Reduction Treaty) exhibition inspection team in September 1991.

=== From the 1990s ===
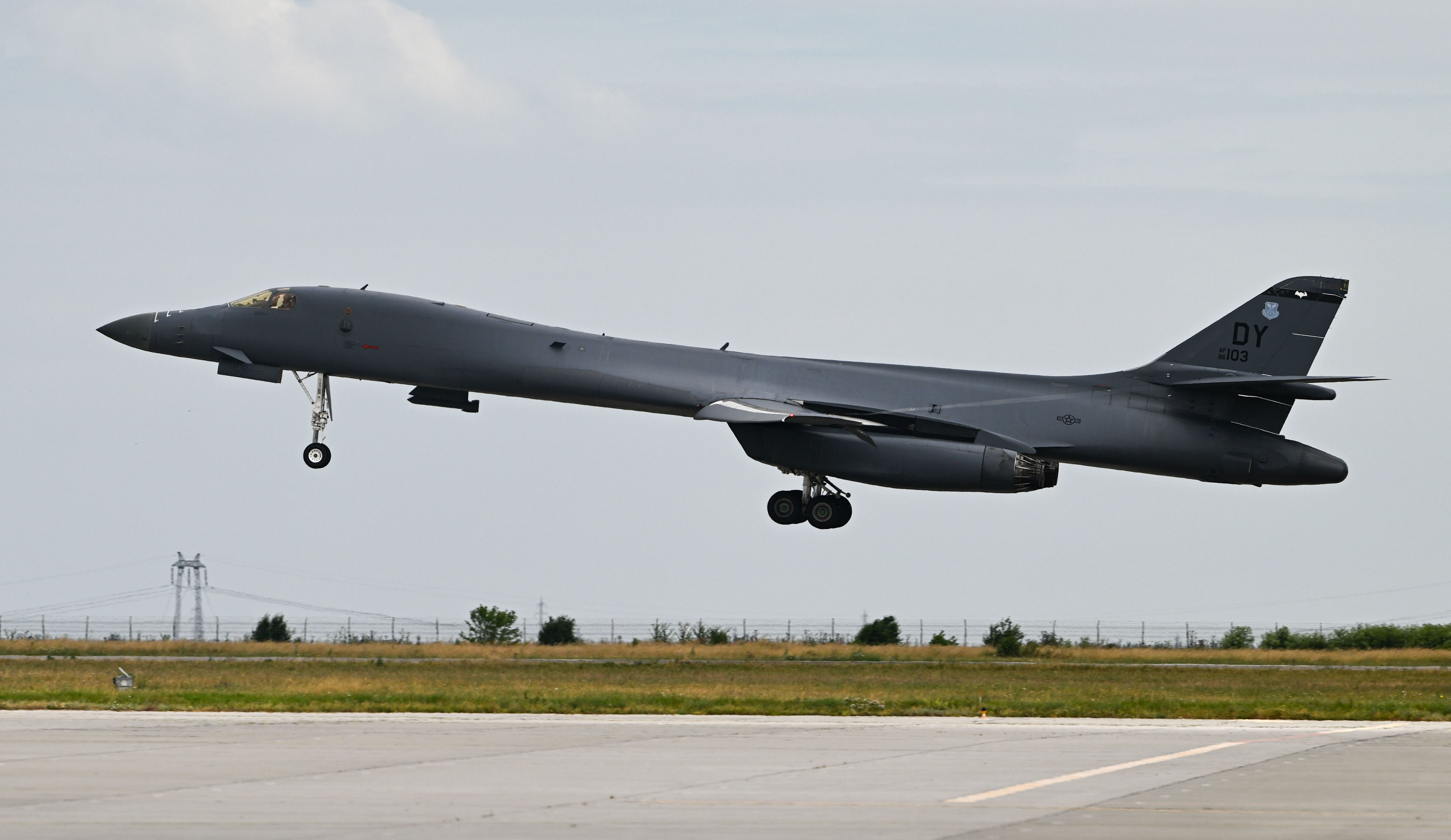
A B-1B Lancer of the 7th Bomb Wing lands at Mihail Kogălniceanu Air Base as part of Air Defender 23

As "host unit" for Carswell AFB, the 7th Bomb Wing began preparations for Base Realignment and Closure Commission (BRAC)-directed base realignment of Carswell AFB in January 1992 and transfer of most of the installation to the U.S. Navy as Naval Air Station Joint Reserve Base Fort Worth / Carswell Field to replace nearby Naval Air Station Dallas, which was also being closed due to BRAC. Concurrent transfer of Carswell's remaining USAF-specific aspects to the Air Force Reserve Command's tenant activities at Carswell, Headquarters, 10th Air Force (10AF) and the 301st Fighter Wing, was also accomplished. 7th Bomb Wing was released of all operational capabilities at Carswell AFB on 1 January 1993.

The 7th Bomb Wing closed Carswell AFB on 30 September 1993, transferring the installation to the U.S. Navy as NAS JRB Fort Worth and to Air Force Reserve Command as Carswell Air Reserve Station and moved to Dyess AFB, Texas without personnel or equipment on 1 October 1993.

At Dyess, they became the 7th Wing, a composite wing equipped with B-1B and C-130 aircraft. In 1997, the wing assumed responsibility for all B-1B initial qualification and instructor upgrade training for Air Combat Command. On 1 April 1997, the wing again became the 7th Bomb Wing when the C-130 airlift mission transferred to Air Mobility Command. Since 2000, the 7th Bomb Wing has provided bombing, training and combat support to combatant commanders.

In the spring of 2015, the Department of the Air Force announced effective 1 October 2015, the 7th Bomb Wing, along with the 28th Bomb Wing at Ellsworth Air Force Base, would be reassigned to the new Air Force Global Strike Command, reuniting all the Air Force's bomber and strategic missiles under a single command for the first time since Strategic Air Command was disestablished 23 years earlier.

== Lineage ==
- Designated as the 7th Bombardment Wing, Very Heavy on 3 November 1947

Organized on 17 November 1947
Discontinued on 1 August 1948
Redesignated 7th Bombardment Wing, Heavy on 1 August 1948 and activated
Redesignated 7th Wing on 1 September 1991
Redesignated 7th Bomb Wing on 1 June 1992
Redesignated 7th Wing on 1 October 1993
Redesignated 7th Bomb Wing on 1 April 1997

=== Assignments ===
- Eighth Air Force, 17 November 1947
- 19th Air Division, 16 February 1951 (attached to 5th Air Division 10 July 1955 – 13 September 1955)
- Eighth Air Force, 13 June 1988
- Twelfth Air Force, 1 October 2002 – 30 September 2015
- Eighth Air Force, 1 October 2015 – present

=== Components ===
Groups

- 7th Bombardment Group (later 7th Operations Group): 17 November 1947 – 16 June 1952; 1 September 1991 – 1 January 1993; 1 October 1993 – present
- 11th Bombardment Group: attached 1 December 1948 – 16 February 1951

Squadrons

- 7th Air Refueling Squadron: 1 April 1958 – 15 April 1960; 1 March 1964 – 1 September 1991; 1 September 1991 – 1 June 1992
- 9th Bomb Squadron: attached 16 February 1951 – 15 June 1952, assigned 16 June 1952 – 25 June 1968; assigned 31 December 1971 – 1 September 1991, 1 October 1993 – present
- 13th Bomb Squadron: 14 June 2000 – 9 September 2005
- 20th Bomb Squadron: 25 June 1965 – 1 September 1991
- 28th Bomb Squadron: 1 October 1994 – present
- 98th Bombardment Squadron: attached 1–10 December 1957
- 436th Bombardment Squadron: attached 16 February 1951 – 15 June 1952, assigned 16 June 1952 – 1 August 1958
- 492d Bombardment Squadron: attached 16 February 1951 – 15 June 1952, assigned 16 June 1952 – 15 June 1959
- 919th Air Refueling Squadron: 15 April-15 July 1960
- 920th Air Refueling Squadron: 15 April-15 July 1960
- 4018th Combat Crew Training Squadron: 1 April 1974 – 31 March 1983

=== Stations ===
- Fort Worth Army Air Field (later Carswell Air Force Base, Texas; 17 November 1947 – 30 September 1993
- Dyess Air Force Base, Texas, 1 October 1993 – present

=== Major Aircraft Assigned ===
- B-29 Superfortress, 1947–1948
- Convair B-36, 1948–1958; RB-36, 1950
- Convair XC-99, 1949
- B-52 Stratofortress

B-52F (1957–1969); B-52D (1969–1983); B-52H (1982–1992)

- KC-135 Stratotanker, 1958–1960, 1964–1965, 1965–1969, 1970–1991
- B-1 Lancer 1985–1993 96th BW, 1993–present with 7th BW

=== Commanders ===
Fort Worth Army Airfield (1942)/Griffiss Air Force Base (1948)/ Carswell Air Force Base (1948):

- Col Alan D. Clark, 17 Nov 1947 - 11 May 1949

Carswell Air Force Base:

- Col William P. Fisher, 11 May 1949 - 3 Jan 1950
- Brig Gen Clarence S. Irvine, 3 Jan 1950 - 16 Feb 1951
- Col John A. Roberts, 16 Feb 1951 - 29 Oct 1951
- Col George T. Chadwell, 29 Oct 1951 - 14 Apr 1952
- Col John A. Roberts, 16 Apr 1952 - 2 Jan 1953
- Col George T. Chadwell, 2 Jan 1953 - 1 May 1954
- Col Clarence A. Neely, 1 May 1954 - 1 Jul 1955
- Col Raymond S. Sleeper, 1 Jul 1955 - 3 Jul 1957
- Col Frederick D. Berry Jr., 3 Jul 1957 - 16 Jul 1957
- Col John A. Roberts, 16 Jul 1957 - 5 Jan 1959
- Col James Y. Parker, 5 Jan 1959 - 6 Jul 1961
- Col George J. Eade, 6 Jul 1961 - 17 Jul 1963
- Col Don W. Bailey, 17 Jul 1963 - ca. 28 Apr 1965
- Col Col Vincent M. Crane, ca. 28 Apr 1965 - ca. 12 Jun 1965
- Col Don W. Bailey, ca. 12 Jun 1965 - ca. 1 Aug 1965
- Unknown (Wing headquarters depleted) ca. 1 Aug 1965 - ca. 30 Nov 1965
- Col Don W. Bailey, ca. 1 Dec 1965 - 1 Aug 1966
- Col Benjamin B. Shields, 1 Aug 1966 - 12 Aug 1966
- Col Ralph T. Holland, 12 Aug 1966 - 23 Jun 1967
- Col Carlton L. Lee, 23 Aug 1967 - 28 Jul 1968
- Col Winston F. Moore, 28 Jul 1968 - 30 Apr 1969
- Col Samuel E. Dyke, 30 Apr 1969 - 11 Sep 1969
- Col Edward R. Van Sandt, 11 Sep 1969 - 16 Sep 1969
- Lt Col Paul A. Warner, 16 Sep 1969 - ca. 31 Mar 1970
- Col Samuel E. Dyke, ca. 31 Mar 1970 - 27 Apr 1970
- Col Donald D. Adams, 27 Apr 1970 - 2 Jun 1971
- Col Robert L. Holladay Jr., 2 Jun 1971 - 26 May 1972
- Col Walter C. Schrupp, 26 May 1972 - 31 May 1973
- Col John D. Beeson, 31 May 1973 - 1 Nov 1973
- Col Walter C. Schrupp, 1 Nov 1973 - 9 Aug 1974
- Col David E. Blais, 9 Aug 1974 - 31 Jan 1977
- Col Edward L. Todd, 31 Jan 1977 - 2 Apr 1979
- Col Francis L. Asbury, 2 Apr 1979 - 19 Feb 1981
- Brig Gen Robert L. Kirtley, 19 Feb 1981 - 20 Apr 1982
- Col Martin J. Ryan Jr., 20 Apr 1982 - 25 Oct 1983
- Col O. K. Lewis Jr., 25 Oct 1983 - 3 Jun 1985
- Col Charles G. Kucera, 3 Jun 1985 - 17 Nov 1986
- Col Donald F. Allan, 17 Nov 1986 - 12 Feb 1987
- Col George P. Cole Jr., 12 Feb 1987 - 3 Aug 1988
- Col John B. Sams Jr., 3 Aug 1988 - 16 Jul 1990
- Col Julian B. Hall Jr., 16 Jul 1990 - 9 Jul 1991
- Col Richard Szafranski, 9 Jul 1991 - 28 May 1993
- Col Gary L. Barber, 28 May 1993 - 1 Oct 1993

Dyess Air Force Base:

- Brig Gen Jerrold P. Allen, 1 Oct 1993 – 4 Aug 1994 (Previously served as the 96th Bombardment Wing Commander at Dyess)
- Brig Gen Charles R. Henderson, 4 Aug 1994 – 4 Aug 1995
- Brig Gen Larry W. Northington, 4 Aug 1995 – 26 Mar 1997
- Brig Gen Michael C. McMahan, 26 Mar 1997 – 18 Jun 1999
- Brig Gen Joseph P. Stein, 18 Jun 1999 – 28 Nov 2000
- Brig Gen Wendell L. Griffin, 28 Nov 2000 – 10 Jan 2003
- Col Jonathan D. George, 10 Jan 2003 – 30 Aug 2004
- Col Garrett Harencak, 30 Aug 2004 – 28 Jul 2006
- Col Timothy M. Ray, 28 Jul 2006 – 11 Jul 2008
- Col Robert F. Gass, 11 Jul 2008 – 22 Jul 2010
- Col David B. Been, 22 Jul 2010 – 3 Jul 2012
- Brig Gen Glen D. VanHerck, 3 Jul 2012 – 14 Feb 2014
- Col Michael Bob Starr, 14 Feb 2014 – 29 Oct 2015
- Col David M. Benson, 29 Oct 2015 – 4 August 2017
- Col Brandon D. Parker, 4 August 2017 – 17 June 2019
- Col Jose E. Sumangil, 17 June 2019 – 15 June 2021
- Col Joseph K. Kramer, 15 June 2021 – 24 Jul 2023
- Col Seth W. Spanier, 24 Jul 2023 – 26 Jun 2026
- Col Robert W. "Ripper" Sturgill 26 Jun 2026 – present

== See also ==
- List of B-52 Units of the United States Air Force
