= John B. Sams =

United States Air Force general

John B. Sams Jr. is a retired United States Air Force lieutenant general and former vice president of the Air Force Systems business unit, part of Boeing Integrated Defense Systems. He is a former chairman of the board of visitors at The Citadel and served as the school's interim president July–October 2018.

== Military career ==
Sams was commissioned as a 2nd lieutenant in 1967, and flew more than 700 hours in 100 missions as a C-7A pilot in Vietnam. Subsequently, he served as an operations and staff officer for the Joint Chiefs of Staff; as the director of bomber operations and as director of conventional plans at Strategic Air Command; and as director of forces, plans and operations at Air Force Headquarters. He was one of the first pilots to fly the E-4B National Emergency Airborne Command Post aircraft and commanded the 1st Airborne Command and Control Squadron at Andrews AFB, Maryland; he also served as commander of the 7th Bomb Wing; the College of Aerospace Doctrine, Research and Education at Air University; 60th Airlift Wing and the Tanker Airlift Control Center at Headquarters Air Mobility Command. The general also commanded the air mobility forces for Operation Provide Hope flying support to Russia and the republics of the former Soviet Union in February 1992. Before becoming 15th Air Force commander, he was vice commander of Air Mobility Command.

== Boeing ==
In February 2000, Sams assumed the position of Boeing director of C-17 Field Services, responsible for the deployment of C-17 Globemaster III into the Air Force operating inventory. He later became the director of business development for the 767 Global Tanker/Transport Aircraft program and then started JBSJ & Associates, an aerospace consulting firm.

== Education ==
Sams holds a bachelor's degree in history from The Citadel and a master's degree in personnel management from Central Michigan University. He is also a graduate of the Emory University Advanced Management Program and the Advanced School for Government at Harvard University.

1967 Bachelor's degree in history, The Citadel, Charleston, S.C.
1973 Squadron Officer School
1977 Master's degree in personnel management, Central Michigan University
1981 Distinguished graduate, Air Command and Staff College, Maxwell Air Force Base, Ala.
1985 Distinguished graduate, Air War College, Maxwell Air Force Base, Ala.
1988 Advanced Management Program, Emory University
1994 Advanced School for Government, Harvard University, Cambridge, Mass.
1995 Seminar XXI Program, Massachusetts Institute of Technology
