= John Sams (cricketer) =

English cricketer

Personal information
- Full name: John Sams

Domestic team information
- Years: Team
- 1871: Sussex

Career statistics
Competition	First-class
Matches	2
Runs scored	32
Batting average	10.66
100s/50s	0/0
Top score	16
Balls bowled	85
Wickets	3
Bowling average	13.66
5 wickets in innings	0
10 wickets in match	0
Best bowling	2/5
Catches/stumpings	2/–
- Source: Cricinfo, 15 December 2011

John Sams (date of birth and death unknown) was an English cricketer.

Sams made two first-class cricket appearances for Sussex County Cricket Club in 1856, both against Surrey. In his first match against Surrey at the Royal Brunswick Ground, Hove, Sams scored 16 runs in Sussex's first-innings before being dismissed by Thomas Sherman. In Surrey's first-innings he took the wicket of Julius Caesar, finishing with figures of 1/20 from ten overs. In Sussex's second-innings he was dismissed by Frederick Miller for 12, he followed this up by bowling two wicketless overs in Surrey's second-innings. Surrey won the match by 9 wickets. In his second match at The Oval, Sams bowled four wicketless overs in Surrey's first-innings, while in Sussex's he was dismissed for a single run by Will Martingell. He took the wickets of Martingell and Will Mortlock in Surrey's second-innings, finishing with figures of 2/5 from five overs. He ended Sussex's second-innings not out on 3, with Surrey winning by 240 runs.
