= Robin Rand =

US Air Force general

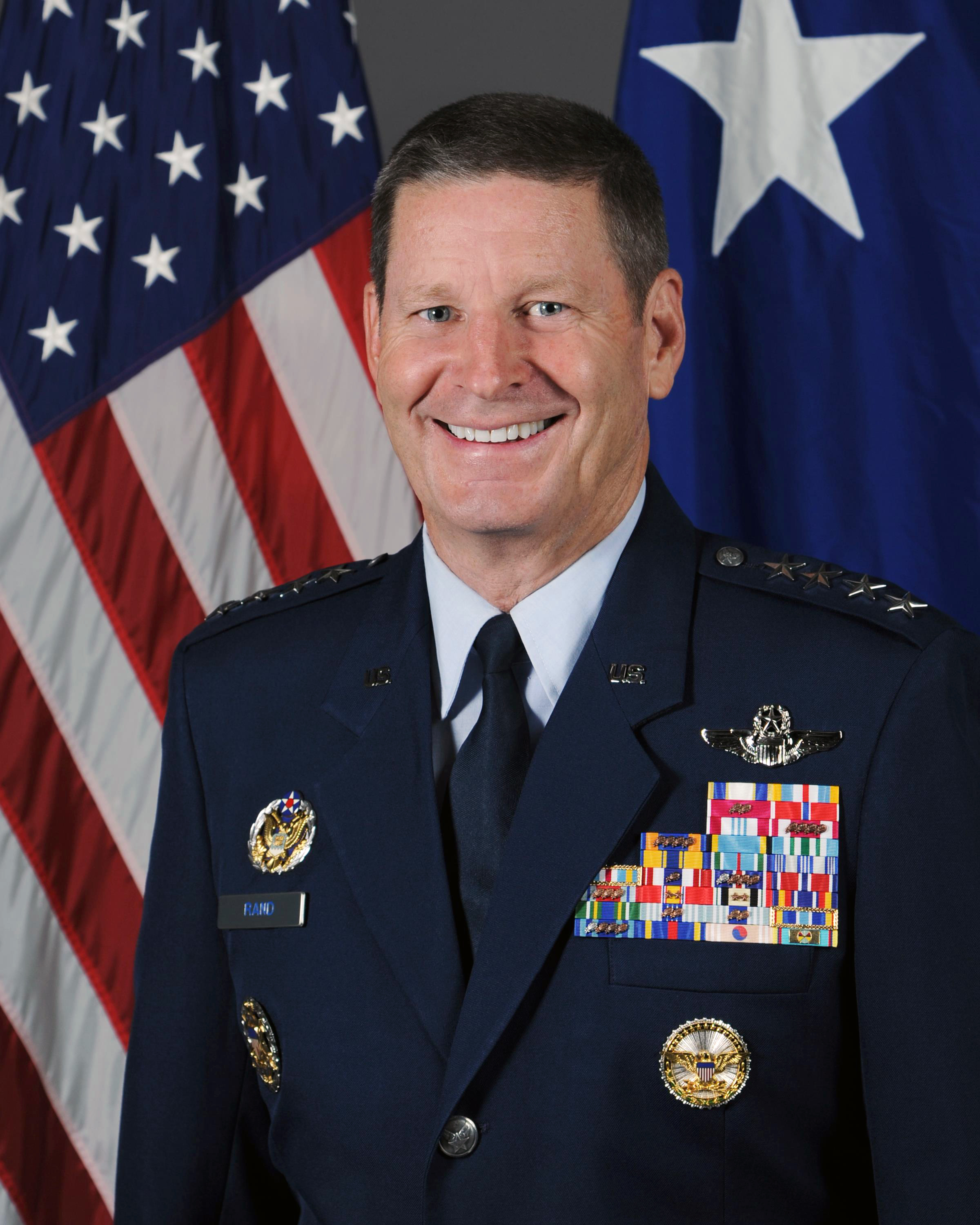
- Rand in 2013
- Born: 1955 or 1956 (age 69–70)
- Alma mater: United States Air Force Academy (BS); Embry-Riddle Aeronautical University (MS); Naval War College (MA)
- Military career
- Allegiance: United States
- Branch: United States Air Force
- Service years: 1979–2018
- Rank: General
- Commands: Air Force Global Strike Command; Air Education and Training Command; 12th Air Force; 332nd Air Expeditionary Wing; 56th Fighter Wing; 8th Fighter Wing; USAF Weapons School
- Conflicts: Iraq War
- Awards: Air Force Distinguished Service Medal (3); Defense Superior Service Medal; Legion of Merit (3); Bronze Star Medal

Robin Rand (born 1956) is a retired United States Air Force general and former commander of Air Force Global Strike Command. He also concurrently served as the commander of Air Forces Strategic, United States Strategic Command, a command that provides combat-ready forces to conduct strategic nuclear deterrence and global strike operations in support of combatant commanders. Rand's post made him responsible for the United States' three intercontinental ballistic missile wings, the two B-52 wings, and the only B-2 wing with two B-1 wings and a weapon's storage complex to be added in FY16, approximately one-third of the nation's nuclear deterrent.

== Early life ==
Rand is a son of Philip Allen Rand, an Air Force colonel who was an airport director in Klamath Falls, Oregon. Rand lived in Klamath Falls for a period in the 1960s, before attending General William Mitchell High School in Colorado, and was commissioned in 1979 after graduating from the United States Air Force Academy.

== Military career ==
Rand's previous commands include the 36th Fighter Squadron, USAF Weapons School, 8th Fighter Wing, 56th Fighter Wing, 332nd Air Expeditionary Wing at Balad Air Base, Iraq, and prior to this assignment 12th Air Force (Air Forces Southern) at Davis-Monthan Air Force Base.

Rand formerly served as the commander of Air Education and Training Command, Joint Base San Antonio-Randolph, Texas. He was responsible for the recruiting, training and education of Air Force personnel. His command included the Air Force Recruiting Service, a numbered air force, and Air University. AETC trains more than 293,000 students per year across 12 bases, with more than 67,900 active-duty, Reserve, Guard, civilians and contractors, and 1,369 trainer, fighter, and mobility aircraft. Rand was nominated for appointment to the grade of general on June 28, 2013, and confirmed by the Senate on August 1, 2013. Rand assumed command of AETC from General Edward A. Rice on October 10, 2013. In early 2015, Rand was nominated and confirmed by the Senate to serve as the first four star commander of the Global Strike Command. He assumed command of Global Strike Command on July 28, 2015, and of Air Forces Strategic Air Command on September 30, 2017. Rand retired effective September 1, 2018.

Rand was a command pilot with more than 5,000 flying hours, including more than 470 combat hours. He has primarily flown the F-16, T-38, and T-37.

== Education ==
- 1974 Graduated from General William Mitchell High School, Colorado Springs, Colorado.
- 1979 Bachelor of Science degree in aviation science, U.S. Air Force Academy, Colorado Springs, Colorado.
- 1982 Squadron Officer School, Maxwell Air Force Base.
- 1986 Air Command and Staff College, by seminar
- 1988 Master of Science degree in aeronautical science, Embry-Riddle Aeronautical University, Florida.
- 1990 United States Air Force Fighter Weapons Instructor Course, Nellis Air Force Base.
- 1998 Master of Arts degree in national security policy, Naval War College, Newport, Rhode Island.

== Military assignments ==
- July 1979 – July 1980, student pilot, undergraduate pilot training, Williams Air Force Base.
- August 1980 – December 1980, T-37 pilot, pilot instructor training, Randolph Air Force Base.
- January 1981 – May 1984, T-37 instructor pilot, 82nd Flying Training Wing, Williams Air Force Base.
- May 1984 – July 1984, AT-38 pilot, fighter lead-in training, Holloman Air Force Base.
- August 1984 – January 1985, F-16 pilot, F-16 training, 63rd Tactical Fighter Squadron, MacDill Air Force Base.
- February 1985 – December 1986, F-16 pilot, 612th Tactical Fighter Squadron, Torrejón Air Base, Spain.
- December 1986 – June 1988, air liaison officer, 3rd Brigade, 1st Armored Division, Bamberg, West Germany.
- July 1988 – October 1988, F-16 pilot, F-16 training, 311th Tactical Fighter Squadron, Luke Air Force Base.
- October 1988 – December 1989, F-16 flight examiner, 432nd Tactical Fighter Wing, Misawa Air Base, Japan.
- January 1990 – April 1990, F-16 pilot, USAF Fighter Weapons Instructor Course, Nellis Air Force Base.
- April 1990 – July 1992, F-16 weapons officer, 13th Fighter Squadron; and weapons and tactics flight commander, 432nd Operations Support Squadron, Misawa Air Base, Japan.
- August 1992 – September 1994, F-16 operations officer, USAF Weapons School, Nellis Air Force Base.
- September 1994 – July 1997, operations officer and Commander, 36th Fighter Squadron, Osan Air Base, South Korea.
- August 1997 – June 1998, student, Naval War College, Newport, Rhode Island.
- June 1998 – May 2000, policy planner, Directorate for Strategic Plans and Policy (J5), Joint Staff, The Pentagon, Washington, D.C. (Joint assignment).
- May 2000 – March 2001, Deputy Commander, 56th Operations Group, Luke Air Force Base.
- April 2001 – April 2003, Commandant, USAF Weapons School, Nellis Air Force Base.
- May 2003 – May 2004, Commander, 8th Fighter Wing, Kunsan Air Base, South Korea.
- June 2004 – June 2006, Commander, 56th Fighter Wing, Luke Air Force Base.
- July 2006 – July 2007, Commander, 332nd Air Expeditionary Wing, Balad Air Base, Iraq (Joint assignment).
- August 2007 – August 2009, Principal Director for Middle East Policy, Office of the Secretary of Defense, The Pentagon, Washington, D.C. (Joint assignment)
- August 2009 – November 2011, Director, Legislative Liaison, Office of the Secretary of the Air Force; and Special Assistant to the Vice Chief of Staff, Headquarters Air Force, the Pentagon, Washington, D.C.
- December 2011 – September 2013, Commander, 12th Air Force, Air Combat Command, and Commander, Air Forces Southern, U.S. Southern Command, Davis-Monthan Air Force Base. (Joint assignment)
- October 2013 – March 2015, Commander, Air Education and Training Command, Joint Base San Antonio-Randolph, Texas
- March 2015 – September 2017, Commander of Air Force Global Strike Command
- September 2017 – September 2018, Commander, Air Force Global Strike Command, and Commander, Air Forces Strategic, U.S. Strategic Command, Barksdale Air Force Base.

== Awards and decorations ==
Rand's awards and decorations are as follows:

US Air Force Command Pilot Badge
Office of the Secretary of Defense Identification Badge
Office of the Joint Chiefs of Staff Identification Badge
Headquarters Air Force Badge

Air Force Distinguished Service Medal with two bronze oak leaf clusters
Defense Superior Service Medal
Legion of Merit with two bronze oak leaf clusters
Bronze Star Medal
Defense Meritorious Service Medal
Meritorious Service Medal with four bronze oak leaf clusters
Air Medal with four oak leaf clusters
Aerial Achievement Medal
Joint Service Commendation Medal
Air Force Commendation Medal
Joint Service Achievement Medal
Air Force Achievement Medal
Joint Meritorious Unit Award
Air Force Meritorious Unit Award with one bronze oak leaf cluster
Air Force Outstanding Unit Award with one silver and three bronze oak leaf clusters
Air Force Organizational Excellence Award
Combat Readiness Medal with three bronze oak leaf clusters
National Defense Service Medal with two bronze service star
Iraq Campaign Medal with two campaign stars
Global War on Terrorism Service Medal
Korea Defense Service Medal
Air Force Overseas Short Tour Service Ribbon with two bronze oak leaf clusters
Air Force Overseas Long Tour Service Ribbon with two bronze oak leaf clusters
Air Force Expeditionary Service Ribbon with gold frame
Air Force Longevity Service Award with one silver and three bronze oak leaf clusters
Air Force Longevity Service Award (second ribbon to denote tenth award)
Air Force Training Ribbon
Order of National Security Merit Sam-Il Medal (Republic of Korea)
Grand Cross of the Air Force Cross of Aeronautical Merit (Colombia)
Grand Officer of the Order of Aeronautical Merit (Brazil)
SICOFAA Legion of Merit, Grand Cross

- 2007 Joseph A. Moller Trophy, Air Combat Command's Outstanding Wing Commander.

== Effective dates of promotion ==
Promotions
Insignia	Rank	Date
	General	October 10, 2013
	Lieutenant general	Sept. 1, 2011
	Major general	June 1, 2009
	Brigadier general	January 1, 2006
	Colonel	February 1, 2001
	Lieutenant colonel	February 1, 1995
	Major	July 1, 1990
	Captain	May 30, 1983
	First lieutenant	May 30, 1981
	Second lieutenant	May 30, 1979

Military offices
Preceded by Stephen W. Wilson	Commander of Air Force Global Strike Command; 2015–2018	Succeeded by Timothy M. Ray
