= Garrett Harencak =

United States Air Force general

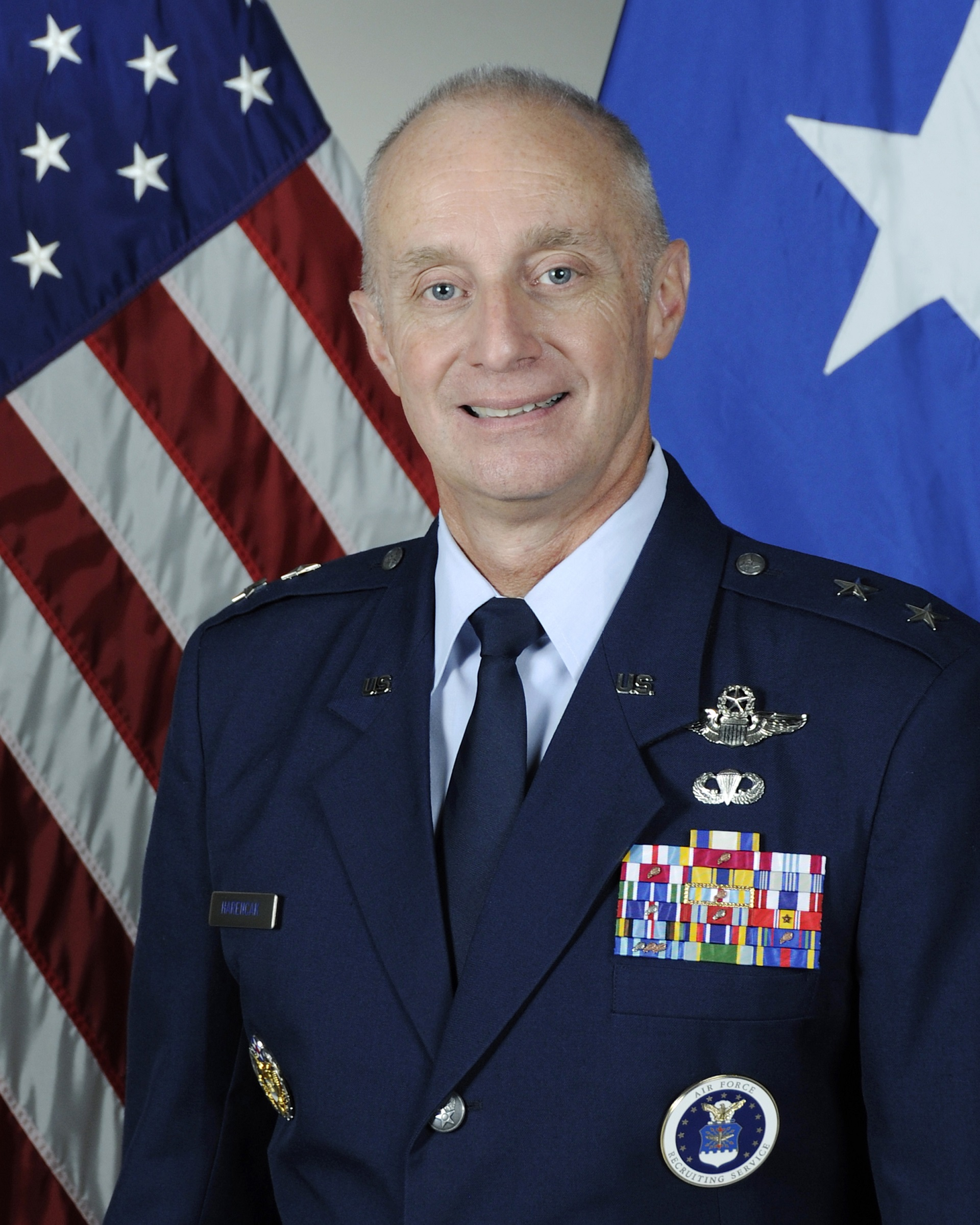
- Military career
- Allegiance: United States
- Branch: United States Air Force
- Rank: Major General
- Commands: Air Force Recruiting Service; Air Force Nuclear Weapons Center; 509th Bomb Wing; 7th Bomb Wing; 28th Bomb Squadron

Major General Garrett Harencak is the commander of the U.S. Air Force Recruiting Service. Previously, he served as the assistant chief of staff for strategic deterrence and nuclear integration, Headquarters U. S. Air Force. Prior this position, Harencak served as commander of the Air Force Nuclear Weapons Center (AFNWC), Air Force Materiel Command at Kirtland Air Force Base, New Mexico. The AFNWC is responsible for the entire scope of U.S. Air Force nuclear weapons support functions and in addition to its headquarters at Kirtland, comprises several other units in the U.S and abroad.

== Biography ==
General Harencak entered the Air Force in 1983 as a graduate of the United States Air Force Academy. Trained as a bomber pilot, Harencak has piloted, served as instructor and functioned as division commander for a variety of large scale Air Force bombing units. He is former Commander of the 509th Bomb Wing, Whiteman Air Force Base, Missouri, responsible for the combat readiness of the U.S. Air Force's only wing of B-2 "Stealth" planes. His responsibilities included development and employment of the B-2's combat capability as part of the U.S. Air Force's Global Strike Task Force. His command provided logistics support for the Air Force Reserve's 442d Fighter Wing; Missouri Army National Guard's 1st Battalion, 135th Aviation Unit; and the Navy Reserve's Mobile Inshore Undersea Warfare Unit 114. This included managing B-2 flying assets worth over $46 billion, and an annual operations and maintenance budget of $147 million. His assignments have also included aircraft command of the B-52; instructor pilot and squadron command in the B-1B; a tour in weapon systems acquisition; and service as aide to the Commander-in-Chief of U.S. Central Command. He also directed the Headquarters Air Force Executive Secretariat. General Harencak commanded the 7th Bomb Wing at Dyess AFB, Texas. He has also served as Deputy Director of Requirements, Headquarters, Air Combat Command, Langley AFB, Virginia. Harencak grew up in the New Jersey town of Elmwood Park, where he was known then and now for his high quality ("Jay Leno funny") sense of humor, as was expressed emphatically by NNSA (National Nuclear Security Administration) administrator Thomas D'Agostino at Harencak's Gold Medal Awards Ceremony in 2011. Harencak is married to Tanya Harencak. They have a daughter Megan who while part of the Air Force ROTC program at FSU (Florida State University), received the thrill of having a B-2 Spirit conduct 3 public flyovers during an FSU football game in September 2008.

=== Education ===
1983 Bachelor of Science, U. S. Air Force Academy, Colorado
1988 Squadron Officer School, Maxwell AFB, Alabama
1991 Master of Science, Abilene Christian University, Abilene, Texas
1994 Air Command and Staff College, Maxwell AFB, Alabama
2002 Master of Science, Air University, Maxwell-Gunter AFB, Alabama
2002 USAF Air War College, Maxwell AFB, Alabama

=== Assignments ===
July 1983–July 1984, student, undergraduate pilot training, Reese AFB, Texas
July 1984–December 1984, student, B-52 Combat Crew Training, Castle AFB, California
December 1984–September 1989, copilot, standards and evaluations pilot, and aircraft commander, 97th Bomb Wing, Eaker AFB, Arkansas
September 1989–August 1993, aircraft commander, instructor pilot, and evaluator pilot, 96th Bomb Wing, Dyess AFB, Texas
August 1993–June 1994, student, Air Command and Staff College, Maxwell AFB, Alabama
June 1994–October 1997, action officer and aide de camp to Commander-in-Chief, U.S. Central Command, MacDill AFB, Florida
October 1997–June 2001, instructor pilot, operations officer, 9th Bomb Squadron and Commander, 28th Bomb Squadron, 7th Bomb Wing, Dyess AFB, Texas
June 2001–June 2002, student, USAF Air War College, Maxwell AFB, Alabama
June 2002–June 2003, Director, Executive Review Secretariat, Headquarters U.S. Air Force, Washington, D.C.
June 2003–August 2004, Vice Commander, 7th Bomb Wing, Dyess AFB, Texas
August 2004–July 2006, Commander, 7th Bomb Wing, Dyess AFB, Texas
July 2006–September 2007, Deputy Director of Requirements, Headquarters ACC, Langley AFB, Virginia
September 2007–March 2009, Commander, 509th Bomb Wing, Whiteman AFB, Missouri
March 2009–January 2011, Principal Assistant Deputy Administrator for Military Application, Office of Defense Programs, National Nuclear Security Administration, Department of Energy, Washington, D.C.
January 2011–February 2013, Commander, Air Force Nuclear Weapons Center, Kirtland AFB, N.M.
March 2013–September 2015, Assistant Chief of Staff, Strategic Deterrence and Nuclear Integration, Headquarters U.S. Air Force, Washington, D.C.
September 2015–present, Commander, Air Force Recruiting Service, Joint Base San Antonio Randolph, Texas

=== Flight information ===
- Rating: Command pilot
- Flight Hours: More than 3,000 hours
- Aircraft Flown: T-37, T-38, B-52G, B-1B, B-2

== Awards and decorations ==
- Air Force Distinguished Service Medal
- Defense Superior Service Medal
- Legion of Merit with oak leaf cluster
- Defense Meritorious Service Medal
- Meritorious Service Medal with two oak leaf clusters
- Air Force Commendation Medal
- Air Force Achievement Medal
- Army Achievement Medal
- Combat Readiness Medal
- National Defense Service Medal with oak leaf cluster
- Armed Forces Expeditionary Medal

== Effective dates of promotion ==
- Second Lieutenant June 1, 1983
- First Lieutenant June 1, 1985
- Captain June 1, 1987
- Major March 1, 1994
- Lieutenant Colonel January 1, 1998
- Colonel June 1, 2003
- Brigadier General January 4, 2008
- Major General June 1, 2012

Military offices
Preceded by William A. Chambers	Deputy Chief of Staff for Strategic Deterrence and Nuclear Integration of the United States Air Force; 2013–2015	Succeeded by Jack Weinstein
