= Environmentally Endangered Lands =

Government conservation program in Florida, U.S.

Environmentally Endangered Lands abbreviated as EEL is a land conservation program in Brevard County, Florida. Established in 1990, the program is funded by voter approved tax dollars. It is intended to conserve natural habitats and environmentally sensitive lands for "conservation, passive recreation, and environmental education". In 2004 a second referendum for land via a willing seller program was also passed. The program leverages its funding with partners from federal, state and local agencies. The lands are then "managed to preserve native habitats and the plants and animals that live there."

In 2011 the Natural Areas Association (NAA) awarded the Environmentally Endangered Lands program with the Carl N. Becker Stewardship Award. The award recognizes "excellence and achievement in managing the natural resources of reserves, parks, wilderness, and other protected areas".

The Thousand Islands in Cocoa Beach were one area considered for acquisition in 2008. In 2011 the funding setup was set to expire. The Barrier Island Center is part of the program.

The Pine Island Conservation Area is part of the Environmentally Endangered Lands program.

== See also ==
- Environmentally Endangered Lands Programs
