= Pine Island Conservation Area =

Protected area in Florida, United States

Coordinates: 28°29′33″N 80°43′48″W

Pine Island Conservation Area is a nature preserve in Merritt Island, Florida.

The St. Johns Water Management District owns the Pine Island Conservation Area and Brevard County manages the land as part of its Environmentally Endangered Lands program.

== Sams House ==
Sams House at Pine Island Conservation Area is a historic home at 6195 North Tropical Trail, Merritt Island, built in 1888 by John Hanahan Sams and his wife Sarah. Adjacent to the Sams House is the Sams Cabin, which is considered the oldest structure in Brevard County. The Sams Cabin was built in 1875 in nearby Eau Gallie, Florida, when the family moved there from South Carolina. The family moved to Courtenay on Merritt Island in 1879 and transported the cabin by water to its new location.

John Sams was a successful farmer of citrus, sugar cane and pineapples. In 1880, he became the first Superintendent of Public Instruction in Brevard County, a position he held until 1900. He was born 11 February 1839 at Johns Island, South Carolina. He attended St. Timothy's Hall in Maryland. He served with the 3rd South Carolina Cavalry Regiment in the Confederate States Army for four years during the Civil War. He married Sarah Stanyarne Sams of Beaufort, North Carolina on 4 March 1865 near the end of the war. He died on 28 November 1924 (aged 85) at Courtenay, Brevard County, Florida and was buried at St. Luke's Episcopal Cemetery.
