= Project Y =

Secret laboratory established by the Manhattan Project

Los Alamos Laboratory
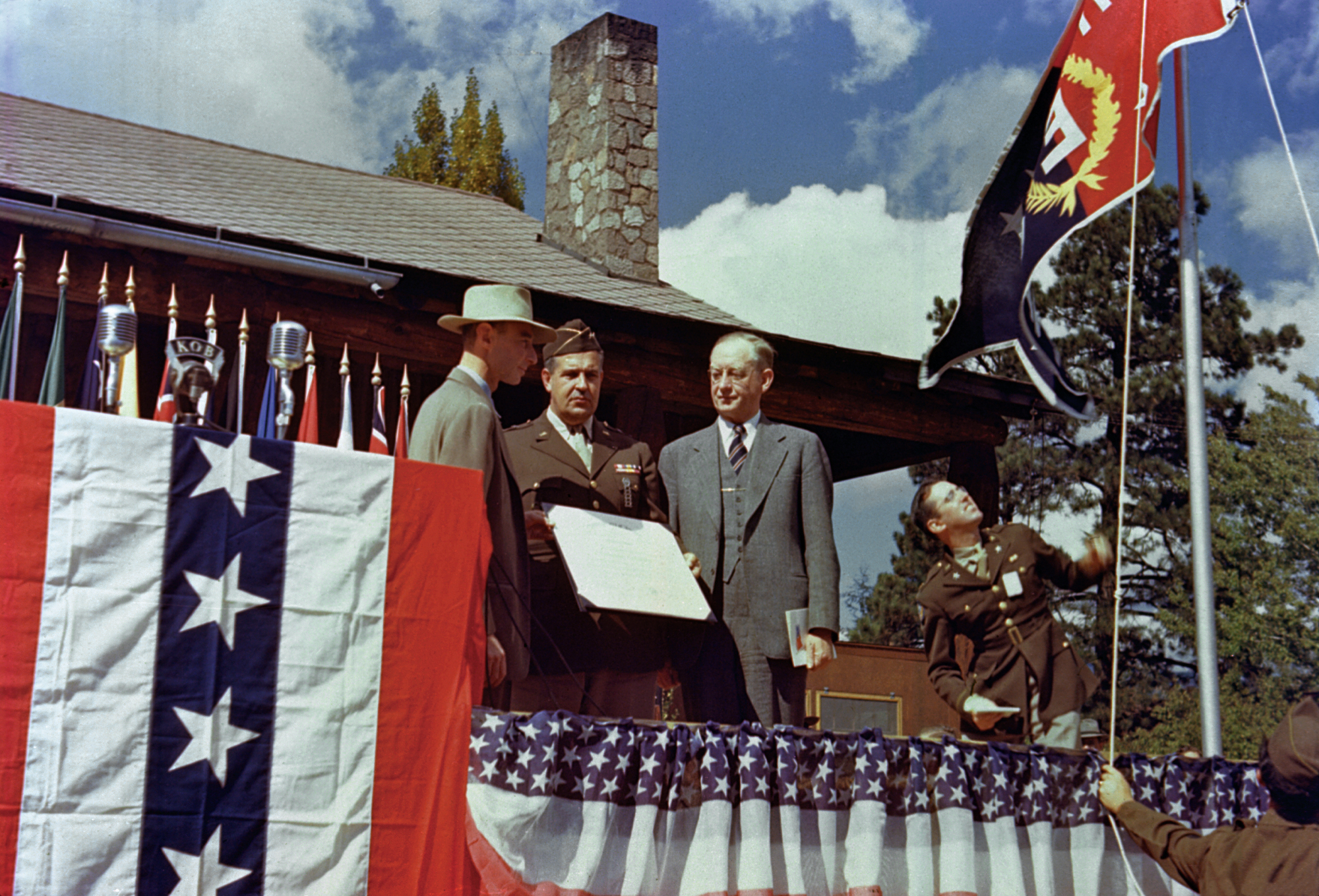
- Robert Oppenheimer (left), Leslie Groves (center) and Robert Sproul (right) at the ceremony to present the Los Alamos Laboratory with the Army-Navy "E" Award at the Fuller Lodge on 16 October 1945
- Established: 1 January 1943
- Research type: Classified
- Budget: $57.88 million
- Field of research: Nuclear weapons
- Director: Robert Oppenheimer; Norris Bradbury
- Location: Los Alamos, New Mexico, United States; 35°52′50″N 106°18′14″W
- Operating agency: University of California
- Los Alamos Scientific Laboratory
- U.S. National Register of Historic Places
- U.S. National Historic Landmark District
- Location within New Mexico Location within the United States
- Location: Central Ave., Los Alamos, New Mexico
- Coordinates: 35°52′54″N 106°17′54″W
- Built: 1943
- Architectural style: Bungalow/Craftsman, Modern Movement
- NRHP reference No.: 66000893
- Added to NRHP: 15 October 1966

The Los Alamos Laboratory, also known as Project Y, was a secret scientific laboratory established by the Manhattan Project and overseen by the University of California during World War II. It was operated in partnership with the United States Army. Its mission was to design and build the first atomic bombs. J. Robert Oppenheimer was its first director, serving from 1943 to December 1945, when he was succeeded by Norris Bradbury. In order to enable scientists to freely discuss their work while preserving security, the laboratory was located on the isolated Pajarito Plateau in northern New Mexico. The wartime laboratory occupied buildings that had once been part of the Los Alamos Ranch School.

The development effort initially focused on a gun-type fission weapon using plutonium called Thin Man. In April 1944, the Los Alamos Laboratory determined that the rate of spontaneous fission in plutonium bred in a nuclear reactor was too great due to the presence of plutonium-240 and would cause a predetonation, a nuclear chain reaction before the core was fully assembled. Oppenheimer then reorganized the laboratory and orchestrated an all-out and ultimately successful effort on an alternative design proposed by John von Neumann, an implosion-type nuclear weapon, which was called Fat Man. A variant of the gun-type design known as Little Boy was developed using uranium-235.

Chemists at the Los Alamos Laboratory developed methods of purifying uranium and plutonium, the latter a metal that only existed in microscopic quantities when Project Y began. Its metallurgists found that plutonium had unexpected properties, but were nonetheless able to cast it into metal spheres. The laboratory built the Water Boiler, an aqueous homogeneous reactor that was the third reactor in the world to become operational. It also researched the Super, a hydrogen bomb that would use a fission bomb to ignite a nuclear fusion reaction in deuterium and tritium.

The Fat Man design was tested in the Trinity nuclear test in July 1945. Project Y personnel formed pit crews and assembly teams for the atomic bombings of Hiroshima and Nagasaki and participated in the bombing as weaponeers and observers. After the war ended, the laboratory supported the Operation Crossroads nuclear tests at Bikini Atoll. A new Z Division was created to control testing, stockpiling and bomb assembly activities, which were concentrated at Sandia Base. The Los Alamos Laboratory became Los Alamos Scientific Laboratory in 1947.

== Origins ==
=== Nuclear fission and atomic bombs ===
The discovery of the neutron by James Chadwick in 1932, followed by the discovery of nuclear fission by chemists Otto Hahn and Fritz Strassmann in 1938, and its explanation (and naming) by physicists Lise Meitner and Otto Frisch soon after, opened up the possibility of a controlled nuclear chain reaction using uranium. At the time, few scientists in the United States regarded an atomic bomb as practical, but the possibility that a German atomic bomb project would develop atomic weapons concerned refugee scientists from Nazi Germany and from other fascist countries (Italy or Hungary), leading to the drafting of the Einstein–Szilard letter in August 1939 to warn President Franklin D. Roosevelt. This prompted preliminary research in the United States, beginning in late 1939.

In nuclear fission, the atomic nucleus of a heavy element splits into two or more light ones when a neutron is captured. If more neutrons are emitted, a nuclear chain reaction becomes possible.

Progress was slow in the United States, but in Britain, Otto Frisch and Rudolf Peierls, two refugee physicists from Germany at the University of Birmingham, examined the theoretical issues involved in developing, producing and using atomic bombs. They considered what would happen to a sphere of pure uranium-235, and found that not only could a chain reaction occur, but that it might require as little as 1 kilogram (2.2 lb) of uranium-235 to unleash the energy of hundreds of tons of TNT. Their superior, Mark Oliphant, took the Frisch–Peierls memorandum to Sir Henry Tizard, the chairman of the Committee for the Scientific Survey of Air Warfare (CSSAW), who in turn passed it on to George Paget Thomson, to whom the CSSAW had delegated responsibility for uranium research. CSSAW set up the MAUD Committee to investigate. In its final report in July 1941, the MAUD Committee concluded that an atomic bomb was not only feasible, but might be produced as early as 1943. In response, the British government created a nuclear-weapons project known as Tube Alloys.

There was still little urgency in the United States, which unlike Britain was not yet engaged in World War II, but Oliphant flew there in late August 1941, and spoke to American scientists including his friend Ernest Lawrence at the University of California. He not only managed to convince them that an atomic bomb was feasible, but inspired Lawrence to convert his 37-inch (94 cm) cyclotron into a giant mass spectrometer for isotope separation, a technique Oliphant had pioneered in 1934. In turn, Lawrence brought in his friend and colleague Robert Oppenheimer to double-check the physics of the MAUD Committee report, which was discussed at a meeting at the General Electric Research Laboratory in Schenectady, New York, on 21 October 1941.

In December 1941, the S-1 Section of the Office of Scientific Research and Development (OSRD) placed Arthur H. Compton in charge of overseeing the scientific research for production and design of the bomb. He delegated bomb design and the making of fast neutron calculations—the key to calculations of critical mass and weapon detonation—to Gregory Breit, who was given the title of "Co-ordinator of Rapid Rupture", with Oppenheimer as an assistant. But Breit disagreed with other scientists working at the Metallurgical Laboratory, particularly Enrico Fermi, over the security arrangements, and resigned on 18 May 1942. Compton then appointed Oppenheimer to replace Breit. John H. Manley, a physicist at the Metallurgical Laboratory, was assigned to assist Oppenheimer by contacting and coordinating experimental-physics groups scattered across the country. Oppenheimer and Robert Serber of the University of Illinois examined the problems of neutron diffusion—how neutrons moved in a nuclear chain reaction—and hydrodynamics—how the explosion produced by a chain reaction might behave.

=== Bomb design concepts ===
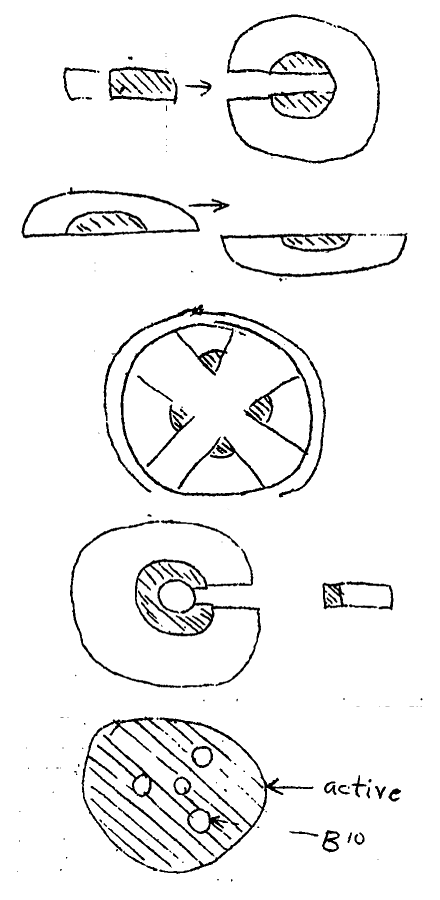
Different fission bomb assembly methods explored during the July 1942 conference (sketches created in 1943 by Robert Serber)

To review this work and the general theory of fission reactions, Oppenheimer and Fermi convened meetings at the University of Chicago in June and at the University of California, Berkeley, in July with theoretical physicists Hans Bethe, John Van Vleck, Edward Teller, Emil Konopinski, Robert Serber, Stan Frankel, and Eldred C. Nelson, the latter three former students of Oppenheimer, and experimental physicists Emilio Segrè, Felix Bloch, Franco Rasetti, John Manley, and Edwin McMillan. They tentatively confirmed that a fission bomb was theoretically possible.

There were still many unknown factors. The properties of pure uranium-235 were relatively unknown; even more so those of plutonium, a chemical element that had only recently been discovered by Glenn Seaborg and his team in February 1941, but which was theoretically fissile. The scientists at the Berkeley conference envisioned breeding plutonium in nuclear reactors from uranium-238 atoms that absorbed neutrons from fissioning uranium-235 atoms. At this point no reactor had been built, and only microscopic quantities of plutonium were available that had been produced by cyclotrons.

There were many ways of arranging the fissile material into a critical mass. The simplest was shooting a "cylindrical plug" into a sphere of "active material" with a "tamper"—dense material that would focus neutrons inward and keep the reacting mass together to increase its efficiency. They also explored designs involving spheroids, a primitive form of "implosion" suggested by Richard C. Tolman, and the possibility of autocatalytic methods, which would increase the efficiency of the bomb as it exploded.

Considering the idea of the fission bomb theoretically settled—at least until more experimental data was available—the Berkeley conference then turned in a different direction. Edward Teller pushed for discussion of a more powerful bomb: the "Super", usually referred to today as a "hydrogen bomb", which would use the explosive force of a detonating fission bomb to ignite a nuclear fusion reaction between deuterium and tritium. Teller proposed scheme after scheme, but Bethe rejected each one. The fusion idea was set aside to concentrate on producing fission bombs. Teller also raised the speculative possibility that an atomic bomb might "ignite" the atmosphere because of a hypothetical fusion reaction of nitrogen nuclei, but Bethe calculated that this could not happen, and a report co-authored with Teller showed that "no self-propagating chain of nuclear reactions is likely to be started".

=== Bomb laboratory concept ===
Oppenheimer's deft handling of the July conference impressed his colleagues; his insight and ability to handle even the most difficult people came as a surprise even to those who knew him well. In the wake of the conference, Oppenheimer saw that while they had come to grips with the physics, considerable work was still required on the engineering, chemistry, metallurgy and ordnance aspects of building an atomic bomb. He became convinced that bomb design would require an environment where people could freely discuss problems and thereby reduce wasteful duplication of effort. He reasoned that this could best be reconciled with security by creating a central laboratory in an isolated location.

Brigadier General Leslie R. Groves Jr. became director of the Manhattan Project on 23 September 1942. He visited Berkeley to look at Lawrence's calutrons, and met with Oppenheimer, who gave him a report on bomb design on 8 October. Groves was interested in Oppenheimer's proposal to establish a separate bomb design laboratory. When they met again in Chicago on October 15, he invited Oppenheimer to discuss the issue. Groves had to catch the 20th Century Limited train back to New York, so he asked Oppenheimer to accompany him so that they could continue the discussion. Groves, Oppenheimer, Colonel James C. Marshall, and Lieutenant Colonel Kenneth Nichols all squeezed into Nichol's single roomette compartment to discuss how a bomb laboratory could be created and how it would function. Groves subsequently had Oppenheimer come to Washington, D.C., where the matter was discussed with Vannevar Bush, the director of the OSRD, and James B. Conant, the chairman of the National Defense Research Committee (NDRC). After Oppie left the train in New Jersey, Groves, Marshall and Nichols agreed that he was the best choice to direct the laboratory, despite his limited administrative experience and lack of a Nobel Prize. On 19 October, Groves approved the establishment of a bomb laboratory.

So Oppenheimer seemed the logical person to direct the new laboratory, which became known as Project Y; Bush, Conant, Lawrence and Harold Urey all expressed reservations. Moreover, unlike his other project leaders—Lawrence at the Berkeley Radiation Laboratory, Compton at the Metallurgical Project in Chicago, and Urey at the SAM Laboratories in New York—Oppenheimer did not have a Nobel Prize, raising concerns that he might not have the prestige to deal with distinguished scientists. But those with a Nobel Prize could not be spared from their existing laboratory jobs. There were also security concerns; many of Oppenheimer's closest associates were active members of the Communist Party, including his wife Kitty, girlfriend Jean Tatlock, brother Frank, and Frank's wife Jackie. In the end, Groves personally issued instructions to clear Oppenheimer on 20 July 1943.

== Site selection ==
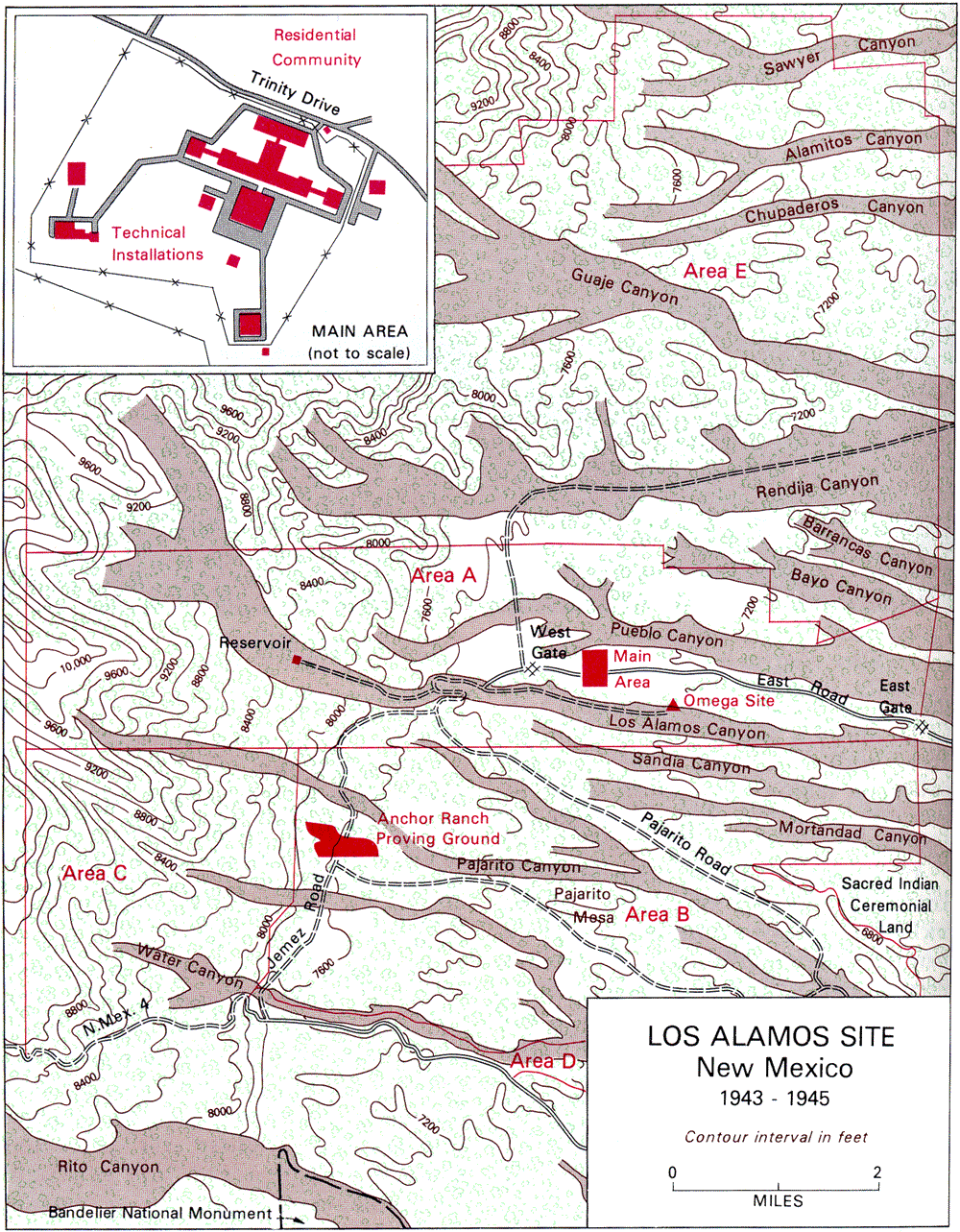
Map of Los Alamos site, New Mexico, 1943–45

The idea of locating Project Y at the Metallurgical Laboratory in Chicago, or the Clinton Engineer Works in Oak Ridge, Tennessee, was considered, but in the end it was decided that a remote location would be best. A site in the vicinity of Los Angeles was rejected on security grounds, and one near Reno, Nevada as being too inaccessible. On Oppenheimer's recommendation, the search was narrowed to the vicinity of Albuquerque, New Mexico, where Oppenheimer owned a ranch in the Sangre de Cristo Range. The climate was mild, there were air and rail connections to Albuquerque, it was sufficiently distant from the West Coast of the United States for a Japanese attack not to be an issue, and the population density was low.

In October 1942, Major John H. Dudley of the Manhattan District (the military component of the Manhattan Project) surveyed sites around Gallup, Las Vegas, La Ventana, Jemez Springs, and Otowi, and recommended the one near Jemez Springs. On 16 November, Oppenheimer, Groves, Dudley and others toured the site. Oppenheimer feared that the high cliffs surrounding the site would make people feel claustrophobic, while the engineers were concerned with the possibility of flooding. The party then moved on to the Otowi site, the vicinity of the Los Alamos Ranch School. Oppenheimer was impressed by and expressed a strong preference for the site, citing its natural beauty and views of the Sangre de Cristo Mountains, which, he hoped, would inspire those who would work on the project. The engineers were concerned about the poor access road, and whether the water supply would be adequate, but otherwise felt that it was ideal.

The United States Under Secretary of War, Robert P. Patterson, approved the acquisition of the site on 25 November 1942, authorizing $440,000 for the purchase of the site of 54,000 acres (22,000 ha), all but 8,900 acres (3,600 ha) of which were already owned by the Federal Government. Secretary of Agriculture Claude R. Wickard granted use of some 45,100 acres (18,300 ha) of United States Forest Service land to the War Department "for so long as the military necessity continues". The need for land for a new road, and later for a right of way for a 25-mile (40 km) power line, eventually brought wartime land purchases to 45,737 acres (18,509.1 ha), but only $414,971 was ultimately spent. The big ticket items were the school, which cost $350,000, and the Anchor Ranch, which cost $25,000. Both hired lawyers to negotiate deals with the government, but Hispanic homesteaders were paid as little as $7 an acre (equivalent to $130 in 2025). Grazing permits were withdrawn, and private land was purchased or condemned under eminent domain using the authority of the Second War Powers Act. Petitions of condemnation were worded to cover all mineral, water, timber and other rights, so private individuals would have no reason whatsoever to enter the area. The site acquired an irregular shape due to abutting the Bandelier National Monument and a Native American sacred burial ground.

== Construction ==
An important consideration in the acquisition of the site was the existence of the Los Alamos Ranch School. This consisted of 54 buildings, of which 27 were houses, dormitories or other quarters providing 46,626 square feet (4,331.7 m^{2}) of accommodation. The remaining buildings included a sawmill, ice house, barns, carpentry shop, stables and garages, all totalling 29,560 square feet (2,746 m^{2}). At the nearby Anchor Ranch there were four houses and a barn. Construction work was supervised by the Albuquerque Engineer District until 15 March 1944, when the Manhattan Engineer District assumed responsibility. Willard C. Kruger and Associates of Santa Fe, New Mexico, was engaged as architect and engineer. Black & Veatch was brought in for the design of utilities in December 1945. The former was paid $743,706.68 and the latter $164,116 by the time the Manhattan Project ended at the end of 1946. The Albuquerque District supervised $9.3 million of construction at Los Alamos, and the Manhattan District, another $30.4 million. The initial work was contracted to the M. M. Sundt Company of Tucson, Arizona, with work commenced in December 1942. Groves initially allocated $300,000 for construction, three times Oppenheimer's estimate, with a planned completion date of 15 March 1943. It soon became clear that the scope of Project Y was far greater than expected, and by the time Sundt finished on 30 November 1943, over $7 million had been spent. The Zia Company took over responsibility for maintenance in April 1946.

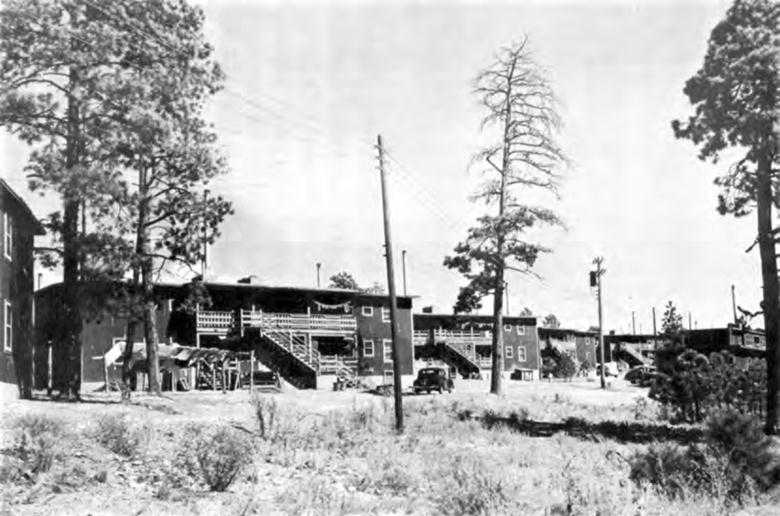
Four-family apartment units at Los Alamos

Oppenheimer initially estimated that the work could be performed by 50 scientists and 50 technicians. Groves tripled this number to 300. The actual population, including family members, was about 3,500 by the end of 1943, 5,700 by the end of 1944, 8,200 by the end of 1945, and 10,000 by the close of 1946. Initially, all of the population were workers, as they were the only ones for whom housing was supplied, but as time went on and more housing became available, the number of dependents increased. This trend accelerated with the end of the war and the replacement of military personnel with civilians with families. Due to the highly classified nature of the work, no census of the population of Los Alamos was conducted until April 1946. Birth certificates of babies born in Los Alamos during the war listed their place of birth as PO Box 1663 in Santa Fe. All letters and packages came through that address.

The most desirable accommodation were the six existing log and stone cottages that had once housed the headmaster and the Los Alamos Ranch School faculty. They were the only dwellings at Los Alamos that had bathtubs, and became known as "Bathtub Row". Oppenheimer lived on Bathtub Row; his next-door neighbor was Captain W. S. "Deak" Parsons, the head of the Ordnance and Engineering Division. Parsons' house was slightly larger, because Parsons had two children and Oppenheimer, at that point, had only one. After Bathtub Row, the next most desirable accommodation was the apartments built by Sundt. A typical two-storey building held four families. Each Sundt apartment had two or three bedrooms, a kitchen with a cranky black coal stove, and a small bathroom. J. E. Morgan and Sons supplied 56 prefabricated dwellings that became known as "Morganville". The Robert E. McKee Company built a part of the town known as "McKeeville". In June through October 1943, and again in June and July 1944, numbers outstripped the available accommodation and personnel were temporarily lodged in Frijoles Canyon. The houses at Clinton Engineer Works in Oak Ridge, Tennessee and Hanford Engineer Works in Washington state were basic but of a higher standard (as specified by Nichols) than the houses at Los Alamos (as specified by Groves), but Nichols said to Los Alamos scientists that housing there was Groves' problem not his.

Rents were set based on the income of the occupant. Transient visitors to Los Alamos were accommodated in the Fuller Lodge, the Guest Cottage or the Big House, which had once been part of the Los Alamos Ranch School. A school was established in 1943, catering for both grade school and high school, and 140 children were enrolled; 350 by 1946. Education was free, as was a nursery school for working mothers. With 18 grade-school teachers, 13 high-school teachers, and a superintendent, it enjoyed an excellent teacher:pupil ratio. Numerous technical buildings were constructed. Most were of a semi-permanent type, using gypsum board. They were heated from a central heating plant. Initially this was Boiler House No. 1, which had two coal-fired boilers. This was replaced by Boiler House No. 2, which had six oil-fired boilers. In addition to the main site at Los Alamos, some 25 outlying sites were developed for experimental work.

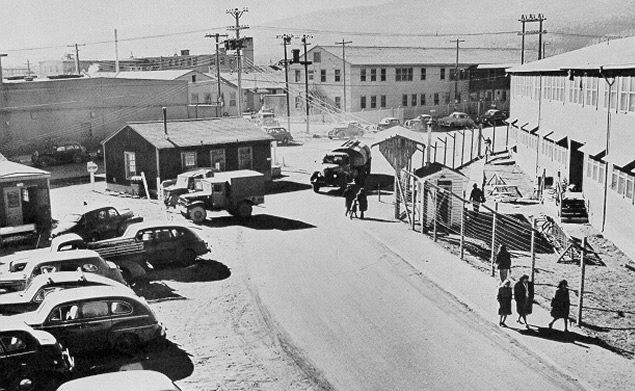
The Technical Area at Los Alamos. There was a perimeter fence around the entire site, but also an inner fence shown here around the Technical Area.

The growth of the town outpaced the sewage system, and by late 1945 there were electrical outages. Lights had to be shut off during the day, and between 7 and 10 pm. Water also ran short. During the autumn of 1945, consumption was 585,000 US gallons (2,210,000 L) per day, but the water supply could furnish only 475,000 US gallons (1,800,000 L). On 19 December, pipes that had been laid above ground to save time in 1943 froze, cutting off the supply completely. Residents had to draw water from 15 tanker trucks that carried 300,000 US gallons (1,100,000 L) per day. Because its name was secret, Los Alamos was referred to as "Site Y"; to residents it was known as "The Hill". Because they lived on Federal land, the state of New Mexico did not allow residents of Los Alamos to vote in elections, although it did require them to pay state income taxes. A drawn-out series of legal and legislative battles lay ahead before the residents of Los Alamos became fully-fledged citizens of New Mexico on 10 June 1949.

Initially Los Alamos was to have been a military laboratory with Oppenheimer and other researchers commissioned into the Army. Oppenheimer went so far as to order himself a lieutenant colonel's uniform, but two key physicists, Robert Bacher and Isidor Rabi, balked at the idea. Conant, Groves and Oppenheimer then devised a compromise whereby the laboratory was operated by the University of California. Financial and procurement activities were the responsibility of the University of California under a 1 January 1943 letter of intent from the OSRD. This was superseded by a formal contract with the Manhattan District on 20 April 1943, which was backdated to 1 January. Financial operations were directed from 1943 to 1946 by UC's resident business officer, J. A. Duane Muncy. The intent was that it would be militarized when the time came to finally assemble the bomb, but by this time the Los Alamos Laboratory had grown so large that this was considered both impractical and unnecessary, as the anticipated difficulties regarding civilians working on dangerous tasks had not occurred.

Scientists were paid (after consultation with the Military Policy Committee) at the salary they were already receiving. The pay of those formerly paid for a nine-months year was increased to pay for the full twelve months. However this meant that Oppenheimer who had been employed by a state university originally received much less than some of his subordinates who came from large Eastern schools. Groves decided to make an exception for Oppenheimer and increased his salary to be equal to that of the others (without consulting him).

== Organization ==
=== Military ===
Colonel John M. Harman was the first post commander at Los Alamos. He joined the Santa Fe office as a lieutenant colonel on 19 January 1943, and was promoted to colonel on 15 February. Los Alamos officially became a military establishment on 1 April 1943, and he moved to Los Alamos on 19 April. He was succeeded by Lieutenant Colonel C. Whitney Ashbridge, a graduate of the Los Alamos Ranch School, in May 1943. In turn, Ashbridge was succeeded by Lieutenant Colonel Gerald R. Tyler in October 1944, Colonel Lyle E. Seeman in November 1945, and Colonel Herb C. Gee in September 1946. The post commander was answerable directly to Groves, and was responsible for the township, government property and the military personnel. Captain James F. Nolan, an obstetrician and gynecologist, was in charge of the medical program. The Los Alamos Base Hospital was small, with 16 to 20 beds. Occupational health and safety was the responsibility of Louis Hempelmann and James Findley Nolan.

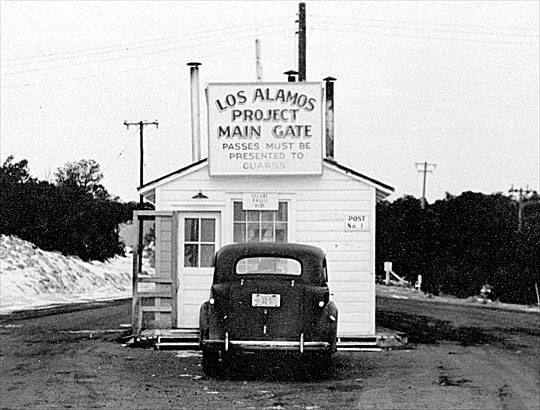
The main gate at Los Alamos

Four military units were assigned to the post. The MP Detachment, 4817th Service Command Unit, arrived from Fort Riley, Kansas, in April 1943. Its initial strength was 7 officers and 196 enlisted men; by December 1946 it had 9 officers and 486 men, and was manning 44 guard posts 24 hours a day. The Provisional Engineer Detachment (PED), 4817th Service Command Unit, was activated at Camp Claiborne, Louisiana, on 10 April 1943. These men performed jobs around the post such as working in the boiler plant, the motor pool and the mess halls. They also maintained the buildings and roads. It reached a peak strength of 465 men, and was disbanded on 1 July 1946.

The 1st Provisional Women's Army Auxiliary Corps (WAAC) Detachment was activated at Fort Sill, Oklahoma, on 17 April 1943. Its initial strength was just one officer and seven auxiliaries. The WAAC became the Women's Army Corps (WAC) on 24 August 1943, and the detachment became part of the 4817th Service Command Unit, with a strength of two officers and 43 enlisted women. They were sworn into the United States Army by Ashbridge. It reached a peak strength of about 260 women in August 1945. The WACs did a wider variety of jobs than the PED; some were cooks, drivers and telephone operators, while others served as librarians, clerks and hospital technicians. Some performed highly specialized scientific research inside the Technical Area.

The Special Engineer Detachment (SED) was activated in October 1943 as part of the 9812th Technical Service Unit. It was made up of men with technical skills or advanced education, and was mostly drawn from the defunct Army Specialized Training Program. War Department policy forbade giving deferments from the draft to men under 22, so they were assigned to the SED. It reached a peak strength of 1,823 men in August 1945. SED personnel worked in all areas of the Los Alamos Laboratory.

=== Civilian ===
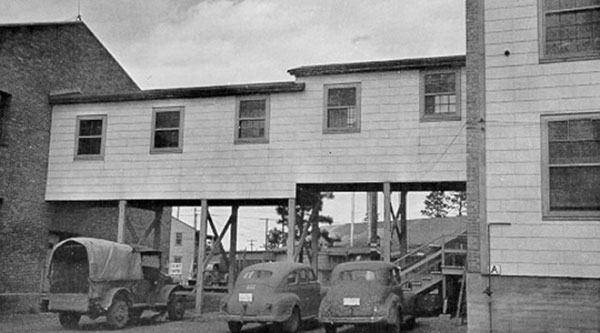
Passage between buildings A and B in the Technical Area

As director of the Los Alamos Laboratory, Oppenheimer was no longer answerable to Compton, but reported directly to Groves. He was responsible for the technical and scientific aspects of Project Y. He assembled the nucleus of his staff from the groups that had been working for him on neutron calculations. These included his secretary, Priscilla Greene, Serber and McMillan from his own group, and Emilio Segrè and Joseph W. Kennedy's groups from the University of California, J. H. Williams' group from the University of Minnesota, Joe McKibben's group from the University of Wisconsin, Felix Bloch's group from Stanford University and Marshall Holloway's from Purdue University. He also secured the services of Hans Bethe and Robert Bacher from the Radiation Laboratory at MIT, Edward Teller, Robert F. Christy, Darol K. Froman, Alvin C. Graves and John H. Manley and his group from the Manhattan Project's Metallurgical Laboratory, and Robert R. Wilson and his group, which included Richard Feynman, that had been performing Manhattan Project research at Princeton University. They brought with them a great deal of valuable scientific equipment. Wilson's group dismantled the cyclotron at Harvard University and had it shipped to Los Alamos; McKibben's brought two Van de Graaff generators from Wisconsin; and Manley's brought the Cockcroft–Walton accelerator from the University of Illinois.

Communications with the outside world went through a single Forest Service line until April 1943, when it was replaced by five Army telephone lines. This was increased to eight in March 1945. There were also three teletypewriters with encoding machines. The first was installed in March 1943, and two more were added in May 1943. One was removed in November 1945. There were telephones in the offices, but none in private residences, as the Army regarded this as a security hazard. There were some public phones in the township for emergencies. Since there was no way to prevent the lines being tapped, classified information could not be discussed over the phone lines. Initially the phone lines were operable only during business hours until enough WACs arrived to staff the switchboard around the clock.

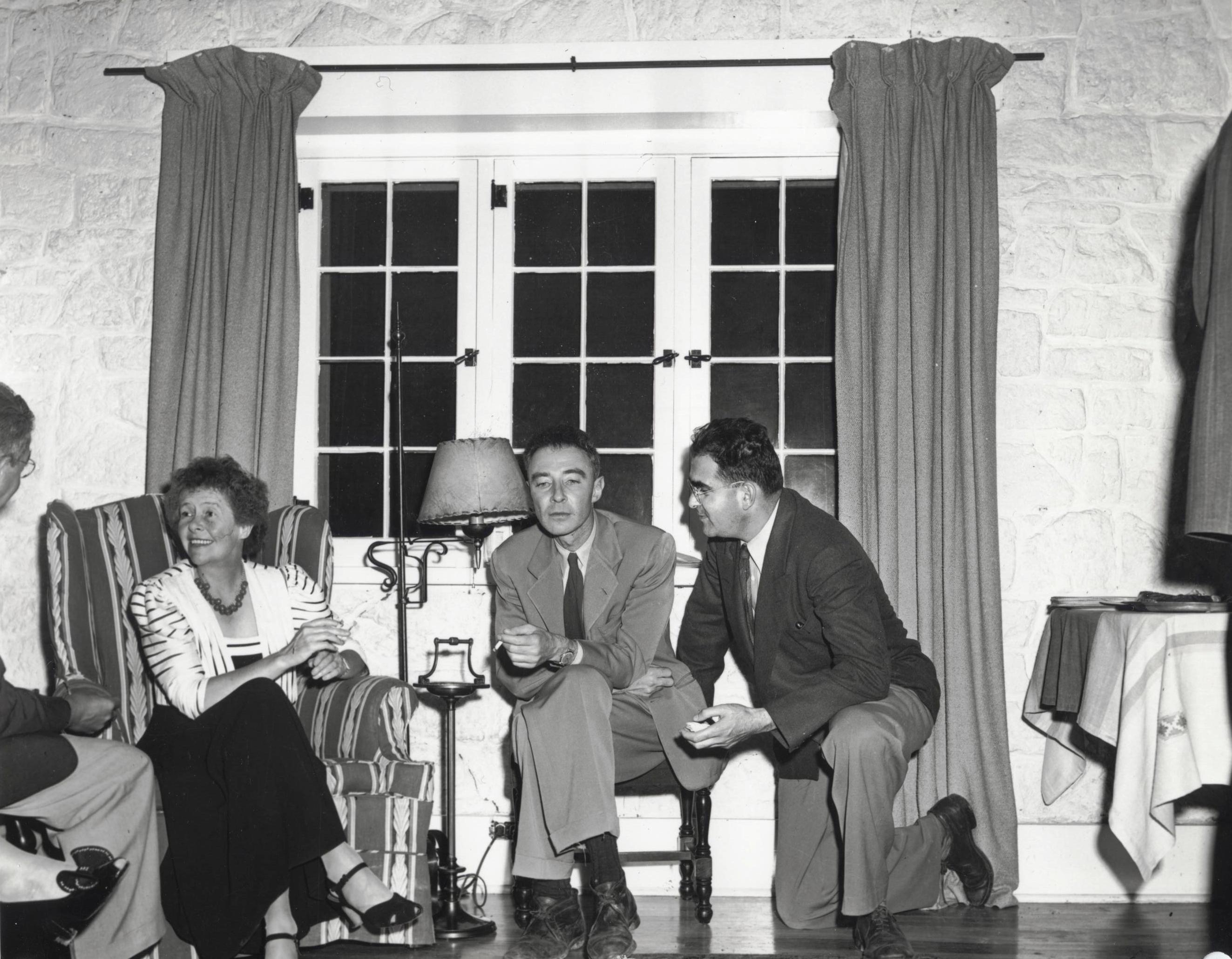
Isidor Isaac Rabi, Dorothy McKibbin, Robert Oppenheimer and Victor Weisskopf at Oppenheimer's home in Los Alamos in 1944

Women at Los Alamos were encouraged to work, due to the shortage of labor and security concerns over bringing in local workers. About 60 wives of scientists were at work in Technical Area by September 1943. About 200 of the 670 workers in the laboratory, hospital and school were women in October 1944. Most worked in administration, but many women such as Lilli Hornig, Jane Hamilton Hall, and Peggy Titterton worked as scientists and technicians. Charlotte Serber headed the A-5 (Library) Group. A large group of women worked on numerical calculations in the T-5 (Computations) Group. Dorothy McKibbin ran the Santa Fe office, which opened at 109 East Palace Avenue on 27 March 1943. New staff members at the secret Los Alamos site were not given in advance any directions to the site or security credentials. They were told to report to the Santa Fe office, where McKibbin provided them with such things and thereby became the gatekeeper of Los Alamos.

The Los Alamos Laboratory had a governing board, the members of which were Oppenheimer, Bacher, Bethe, Kennedy, D. L. Hughes (Personnel Director), D. P. Mitchell (Procurement Director) and Deak Parsons. McMillan, George Kistiakowsky and Kenneth Bainbridge were later added. The laboratory was organized into five divisions: Administration (A), Theoretical (T) under Bethe, Experimental Physics (P) under Bacher, Chemistry and Metallurgy (CM) under Kennedy, and Ordnance and Engineering (E) under Parsons. All the divisions expanded during 1943 and 1944, but T Division, despite trebling in size, remained the smallest, while E Division grew to be the largest. Security clearance was a problem. Scientists (including, at first, Oppenheimer) had to be given access to the Technical Area without proper clearance. In the interest of efficiency, Groves approved an abbreviated process by which Oppenheimer vouched for senior scientists, and three other employees were sufficient to vouch for a junior scientist or technician.

The Los Alamos Laboratory was reinforced by a British Mission under James Chadwick. The first to arrive were Otto Frisch and Ernest Titterton; later arrivals included Niels Bohr and his son Aage Bohr, and Sir Geoffrey Taylor, an expert on hydrodynamics who made a major contribution to the understanding of the Rayleigh–Taylor instability. This instability at the interface between two fluids of different densities occurs when the lighter fluid is pushing the heavier, and was vital to the interpretation of experiments with explosives, predicting the effects of an explosion, the design of the neutron initiators, and the design of the atomic bomb itself. Chadwick remained only for a few months; he was succeeded as head of the British Mission by Rudolf Peierls. The original idea, favored by Groves, was that the British scientists would work as a group under Chadwick, who would farm out work to them. This was soon discarded in favor of having the British Mission fully integrated into the laboratory. They worked in most of its divisions, only being excluded from plutonium chemistry and metallurgy. With the passage of the Atomic Energy Act of 1946, known as the McMahon Act, all British government employees had to leave. All had left by the end of 1946, except for Titterton, who was granted a special dispensation, and remained until 12 April 1947. The British Mission ended when he departed.

== Gun-type weapon design ==
=== Research ===
Los Alamos Technical Area

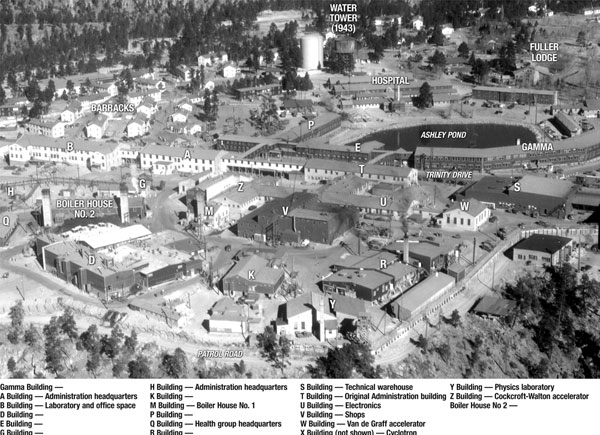
Photograph of the Tech Area, with the buildings marked.

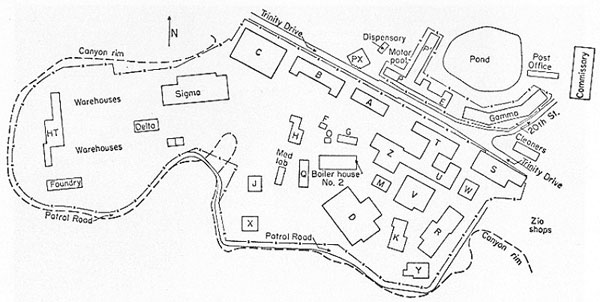
Map of the Tech Area

In 1943, development efforts were directed to a gun-type fission weapon using plutonium called Thin Man. The names for all three atomic bomb designs—Fat Man, Thin Man, and Little Boy—were chosen by Serber based on their shapes. Thin Man was a long device, and its name came from the Dashiell Hammett detective novel and series of movies of the same name. The Fat Man was round and fat, and was named after Sydney Greenstreet's "Kasper Gutman" character in The Maltese Falcon. Little Boy came last, and was named after Elisha Cook, Jr.'s character in the same film, as referred to by Humphrey Bogart.

A series of conferences in April and May 1943 laid out the laboratory's plan for the rest of the year. Oppenheimer estimated the critical mass of a uranium-235 gadget with a formula based on diffusion theory derived at Berkeley by Stan Frankel and E. C. Nelson. This gave a value for a uranium-235 gadget with a perfect tamper of 25 kg; but this was only an approximation. It was based on simplifying assumptions, notably that all neutrons had the same speed, that all collisions were elastic, that they were scattered isotropically, and that the mean free path of neutrons in the core and tamper were the same. Bethe's T Division, particularly Serber's T-2 (Diffusion Theory) Group and Feynman's T-4 (Diffusion Problems) Groups, would spend the next few months working on improved models. Bethe and Feynman also developed a formula for the efficiency of the reaction.

No formula could be more accurate than the values put into it; the values for the cross sections were dubious, and had not yet been determined for plutonium. Measurement of these values would be a priority, but the laboratory possessed just 1 gram of uranium-235, and only a few micrograms of plutonium. This task fell to Bacher's P Division. Williams P-2 (Electrostatic Generator) Group carried out the first experiment in July 1943, when it used the larger of the two Van de Graaff generators to measure the ratio of the neutron per fission in plutonium against that of uranium-235. This involved some negotiation with the Metallurgical Laboratory to obtain 165 μg of plutonium, which was received at Los Alamos on 10 July 1943. Bacher was able to report that the number of neutrons per fission of plutonium-239 was 2.64 ± 0.2, about 1.2 times as much as uranium-235. Titterton and Boyce McDaniel of Wilson's P-1 (Cyclotron) Group attempted to measure the time it took for prompt neutrons to be emitted from a uranium-235 nucleus when it fissions. They calculated that most were emitted in less than 1 nanosecond. Subsequent experiments demonstrated that fission took less than a nanosecond too. Confirmation of the theorists' contention that the number of neutrons emitted per fission was the same for both fast and slow neutrons took longer, and was not completed until the autumn of 1944.

John von Neumann visited the Los Alamos Laboratory in September 1943 and participated in discussions of the damage that an atomic bomb would do. He explained that while the damage done by a small explosion was proportional to the impulse (the average pressure of the explosion times its duration), the damage from large explosions such as an atomic bomb would be determined by the peak pressure, which depends on the cube root of its energy. Bethe then calculated that a 10 kilotonnes of TNT (42 TJ) explosion would result in an overpressure of 0.1 standard atmospheres (10 kPa) at 3.5 kilometers (2.2 mi), and therefore result in severe damage within that radius. Von Neumann also suggested that, because pressure increases when shock waves bounce off solid objects, the damage could be increased if the bomb was detonated at an altitude comparable to the damage radius, approximately 1 to 2 kilometers (3,300 to 6,600 ft).

=== Development ===
Parsons was appointed the head of Ordnance and Engineering Division in June 1943 on the recommendation of Bush and Conant. To staff the division, Tolman, who acted as a coordinator of the gun development effort, brought in John Streib, Charles Critchfield and Seth Neddermeyer from the National Bureau of Standards. The division was initially organized into five groups, with original group leaders being McMillan of the E-1 (Proving Ground) Group, Kenneth Bainbridge of the E-2 (Instrumentation) Group, Robert Brode of the E-3 (Fuse Development) Group, Critchfield of the E-4 (Projectile, Target, and Source) Group and Neddermeyer of the E-5 (Implosion) Group. Two more groups were added in the autumn of 1943, the E-7 (Delivery) Group under Norman Ramsey and the E-8 (Interior Ballistics) Group under Joseph O. Hirschfelder.

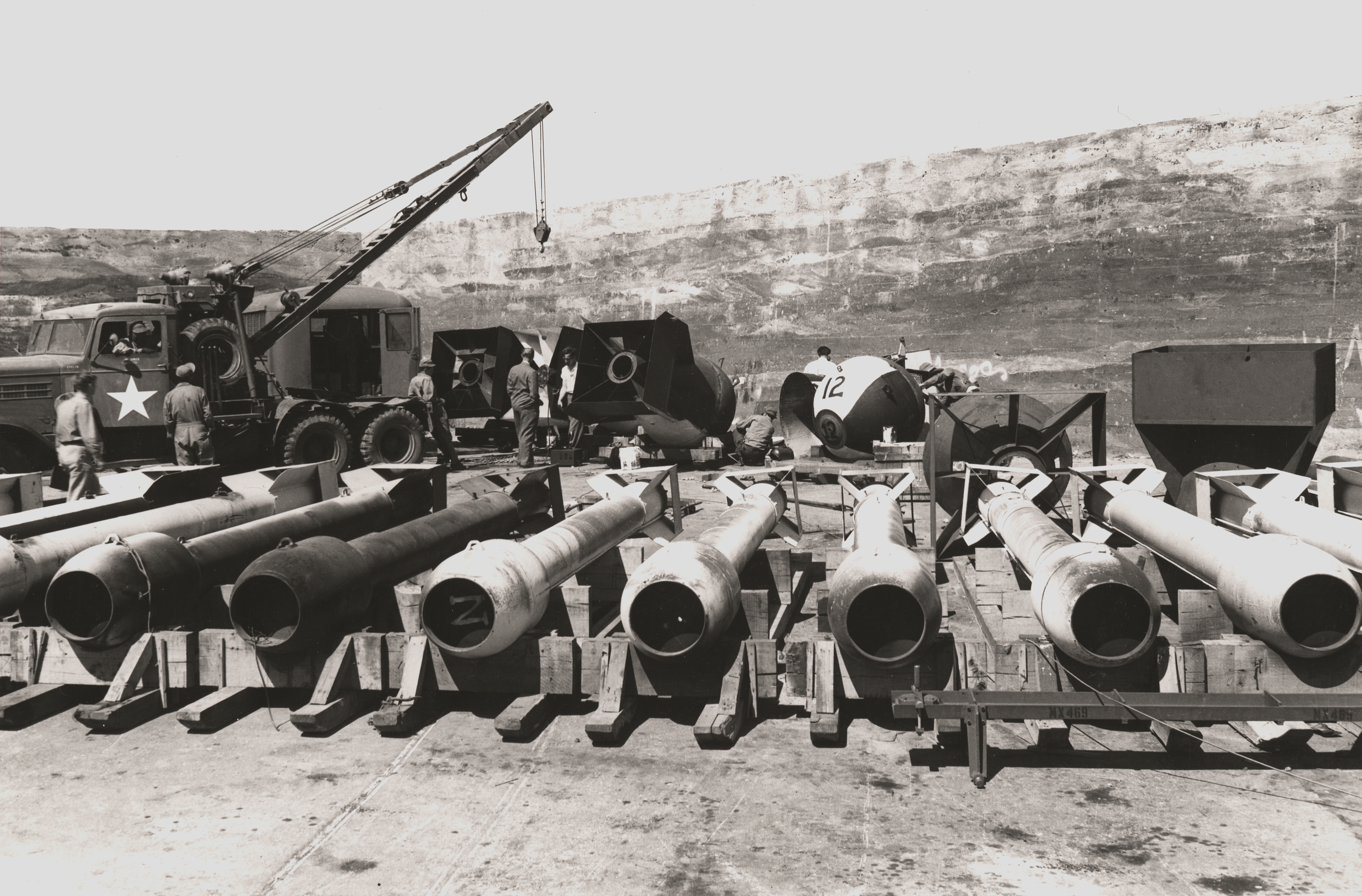
A row of Thin Man casings used for ballistic testing at Muroc Army Airfield. Fat Man casings are visible in the background.

A proving ground was established at the Anchor Ranch. The gun would be an unusual one, and it had to be designed in the absence of crucial data about the critical mass. The design criteria were that the gun would have a muzzle velocity of 3,000 feet per second (910 m/s); that the tube would weigh only 1 short ton (0.91 t) instead of the conventional 5 short tons (4.5 t) for a tube with that energy; that, as a consequence it would be made of alloyed steel; that it should have a maximum breech pressure of 75,000 pounds per square inch (520,000 kPa); and that it should have three independent primers. Because it would need to be fired only once, the barrel could be made lighter than the conventional gun. Nor did it require rifling or recoil mechanisms. Pressure curves were computed under Hirschfelder's supervision at the Geophysical Laboratory prior to his joining the Los Alamos Laboratory.

While they waited for the guns to be fabricated by the Naval Gun Factory, various propellants were tested. Hirschfelder sent John L. Magee to the Bureau of Mines' Experimental Mine at Bruceton, Pennsylvania to test the propellant and ignition system. Test firing was conducted at the Anchor Ranch with a 3-inch (76 mm)/50 caliber gun. This allowed the fine-tuning of the testing instrumentation. The first two tubes arrived at Los Alamos on 10 March 1944, and test firing began at the Anchor Ranch under the direction of Thomas H. Olmstead, who had experience in such work at the Naval Proving Ground in Dahlgren, Virginia. The primers were tested and found to work at pressures up to 80,000 pounds per square inch (550,000 kPa). Brode's group investigated the fusing systems, testing radar altimeters, proximity fuses and barometric altimeter fuses.

Tests were conducted with a frequency modulated type radar altimeter known as AYD and a pulse type known as 718. The AYD modifications were made by the Norden Laboratories Corporation under an OSRD contract. When the manufacturer of 718, RCA, was contacted, it was learned that a new tail warning radar, AN/APS-13, later nicknamed Archie, was just entering production, which could be adapted for use as a radar altimeter. The third unit to be made was delivered to Los Alamos in April 1944. In May it was tested by diving an AT-11. This was followed by full-scale drop testing in June and July. These were very successful, whereas the AYD continued to suffer from problems. Archie was therefore adopted, although the scarcity of units in August 1944 precluded wholescale destructive testing. Testing of Silverplate Boeing B-29 Superfortress aircraft with Thin Man bomb shapes was carried out at Muroc Army Air Field in March and June 1944.

== Plutonium ==
At a meeting of the S-1 Executive Committee on 14 November 1942, Chadwick had expressed a fear that the alpha particles emitted by plutonium could produce neutrons in light elements present as impurities, which in turn would produce fission in the plutonium and cause a predetonation, a chain reaction before the core was fully assembled. This had been considered by Oppenheimer and Seaborg the month before, and the latter had calculated that neutron emitters like boron had to be restricted to one part in a hundred billion. There was some doubt about whether a chemical process could be developed that could ensure this level of purity, and Chadwick brought the matter to the S-1 Executive Committee's attention for it to be considered further. Four days later, though, Lawrence, Oppenheimer, Compton and McMillan reported to Conant that they had confidence that the exacting purity requirement could be met.

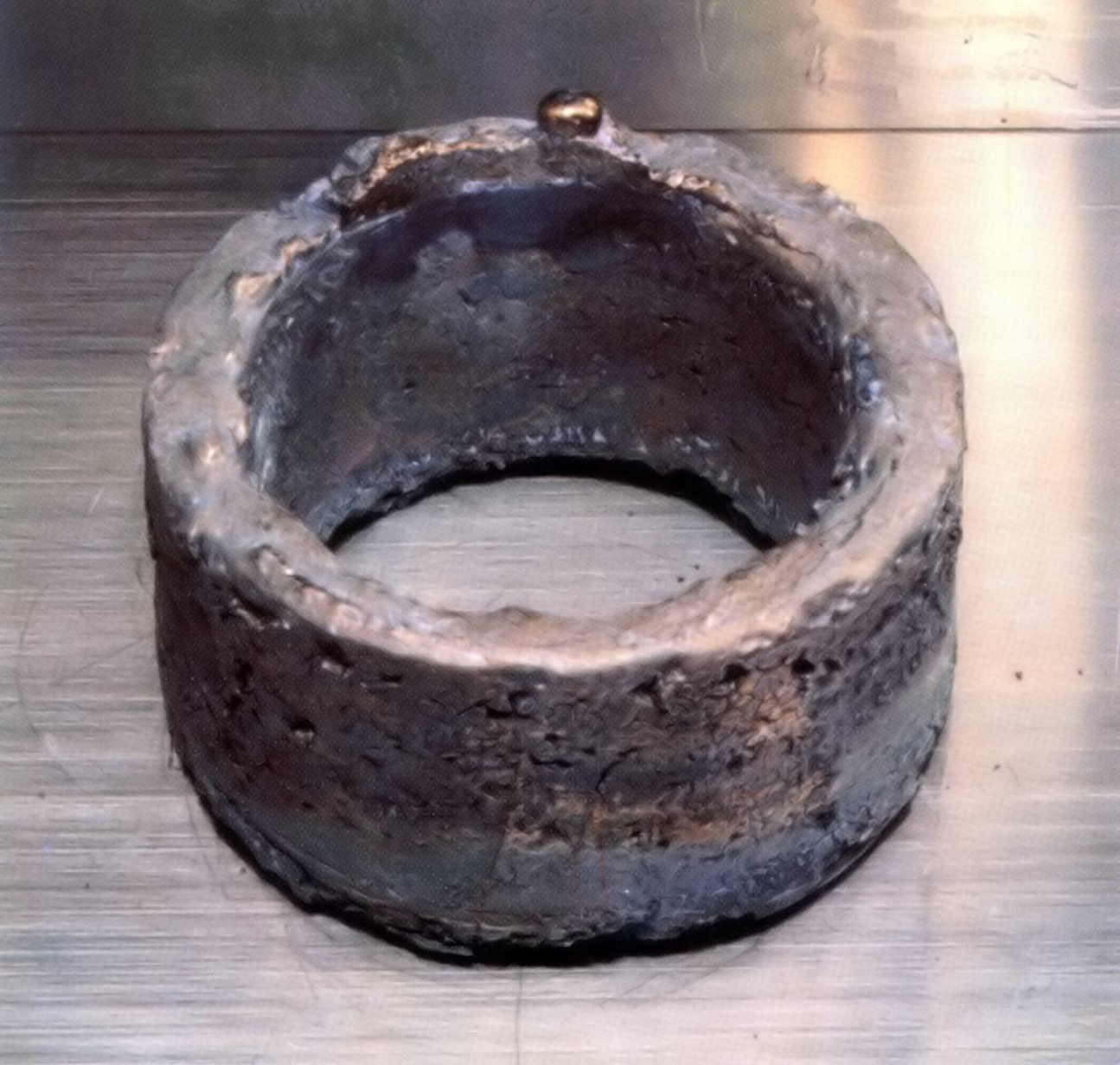
A ring of electrorefined plutonium. It has a purity of 99.96%, weighs 5.3 kg, and is about 11 cm in diameter. It is enough plutonium for one bomb core. The ring shape helps with criticality safety.

Only microscopic quantities of plutonium were available until the X-10 Graphite Reactor at the Clinton Engineer Works came online on 4 November 1943, but there were already some worrying signs. When plutonium fluoride was produced at the Metallurgical Laboratory, it was sometimes light colored, and sometimes dark, although the chemical process was the same. When they managed to reduce it to plutonium metal in November 1943, the density was measured at 15 g/cm^{3}, and a measurement using X-ray scattering techniques pointed to a density of 13 g/cm^{3}. This was bad; it had been assumed that its density was the same as uranium, about 19 g/cm^{3}. If these figures were correct, far more plutonium would be needed for a bomb. Kennedy disliked Seaborg's ambitious and attention-seeking manner, and with Arthur Wahl had devised a procedure for plutonium purification independent of Seaborg's group. When they got hold of a sample in February, this procedure was tested. That month the Metallurgical Laboratory announced that it had determined that there were two different fluorides: the light colored plutonium tetrafluoride (PuF_{4}) and the dark plutonium trifluoride (PuF_{3}). The chemists soon discovered how to make them selectively, and the former turned out to be easier to reduce to metal. Measurements in March 1944 indicated a density of between 19 and 20 g/cm^{3}.

Eric Jette's CM-8 (Plutonium Metallurgy) Group began experimenting with plutonium metal after gram quantities were received at the Los Alamos Laboratory in March 1944. By heating it, the metallurgists discovered five temperatures between 137 and 580 °C (279 and 1,076 °F) at which it suddenly started absorbing heat without increasing in temperature. This was a strong indication of multiple allotropes of plutonium; but was initially considered too bizarre to be true. Further testing confirmed a state change around 135 °C (275 °F); it entered the δ phase, with a density of 16 g/cm^{3}. Seaborg had claimed that plutonium had a melting point of around 950 to 1,000 °C (1,740 to 1,830 °F), about that of uranium, but the metallurgists at the Los Alamos Laboratory soon discovered that it melted at around 635 °C (1,175 °F). The chemists then turned to techniques for removing light element impurities from the plutonium; but on 14 July 1944, Oppenheimer informed Kennedy that this would no longer be required.

Plutonium has six allotropes at ambient pressure: alpha (α), beta (β), gamma (γ), delta (δ), delta prime (δ'), & epsilon (ε)

The notion of spontaneous fission had been raised by Niels Bohr and John Archibald Wheeler in their 1939 treatment of the mechanism of nuclear fission. The first attempt to discover spontaneous fission in uranium was made by Willard Libby, but he failed to detect it. It had been observed in Britain by Frisch and Titterton, and independently in the Soviet Union by Georgy Flyorov and Konstantin Petrzhak in 1940; the latter are generally credited with the discovery. Compton had also heard from the French physicist Pierre Auger that Frédéric Joliot-Curie had detected what might have been spontaneous fission in polonium. If true, it might preclude the use of polonium in the neutron initiators; if true for plutonium, it might mean that the gun-type design would not work. The consensus at the Los Alamos Laboratory was that it was not true, and that Joliot-Curie's results had been distorted by impurities.

At the Los Alamos Laboratory, Emilio Segrè's P-5 (Radioactivity) Group set out to measure it in uranium-234, −235 and −238, plutonium, polonium, protactinium and thorium. They were not too worried about the plutonium itself; their main concern was the issue Chadwick had raised about interaction with light element impurities. Segrè and his group of young physicists set up their experiment in an old Forest Service log cabin in Pajarito Canyon, about 14 miles (23 km) from the Technical Area, in order to minimize background radiation emanating for other research at the Los Alamos Laboratory.

By August 1943, they had good values for all the elements tested except for plutonium, which they were unable to measure accurately enough because the only sample they had was five 20 μg samples created by the 60-inch cyclotron at Berkeley. They did observe that measurements taken at Los Alamos were greater than those made at Berkeley, which they attributed to cosmic rays, which are more numerous at Los Alamos, which is 7,300 feet (2,200 m) above sea level. While their measurements indicated a spontaneous fission rate of 40 fissions per gram per hour, which was high but acceptable, the error margin was unacceptably large. In April 1944 they received a sample from the X-10 Graphite Reactor. Tests soon indicated 180 fissions per gram per hour, which was unacceptably high. It fell to Bacher to inform Compton, who was visibly shaken. Suspicion fell on plutonium-240, an isotope that had not yet been discovered, but whose existence had been suspected, it being simply created by a plutonium-239 nucleus absorbing a neutron. What had not been suspected was its high spontaneous fission rate. Segrè's group measured it at 1.6 million fissions per gram per hour, compared with just 40 per gram per hour for plutonium-239. This meant that reactor-bred plutonium was unsuitable for use in a gun-type weapon. The plutonium-240 would start the chain reaction too quickly, causing a predetonation that would release enough energy to disperse the critical mass before enough plutonium reacted. A faster gun was suggested but found to be impractical. So too was the possibility of separating the isotopes, as plutonium-240 is even harder to separate from plutonium-239 than uranium-235 from uranium-238.

== Implosion-type weapon design ==
Explosive lenses are used to compress a fissile core inside an implosion-type nuclear weapon.

Work on an alternative method of bomb design, known as implosion, had begun by Neddermeyer's E-5 (Implosion) group. Serber and Tolman had conceived implosion during the April 1943 conferences as a means of assembling pieces of fissionable material together to form a critical mass. Neddermeyer took a different tack, attempting to crush a hollow cylinder into a solid bar. The idea was to use explosives to crush a subcritical amount of fissile material into a smaller and denser form. When the fissile atoms are packed closer together, the rate of neutron capture increases, and they form a critical mass. The metal needs to travel only a very short distance, so the critical mass is assembled in much less time than it would take with the gun method. At the time, the idea of using explosives in this manner was quite novel. To facilitate the work, a small plant was established at the Anchor Ranch for casting explosive shapes.

Throughout 1943, implosion was considered a backup project in case the gun-type proved impractical for some reason. Theoretical physicists like Bethe, Oppenheimer and Teller were intrigued by the idea of a design of an atomic bomb that made more efficient use of fissile material, and permitted the use of material of lower purity. These were advantages of particular attraction to Groves. But while Neddermeyer's 1943 and early 1944 investigations into implosion showed promise, it was clear that the problem would be much more difficult from a theoretical and engineering perspective than the gun design. In July 1943, Oppenheimer wrote to John von Neumann, asking for his help, and suggesting that he visit Los Alamos where he could get "a better idea of this somewhat Buck Rogers project".

At the time, von Neumann was working for the Navy Bureau of Ordnance, Princeton University, the Army's Aberdeen Proving Ground and the NDRC. Oppenheimer, Groves and Parsons appealed to Tolman and Rear Admiral William R. Purnell to release von Neumann. He visited Los Alamos from 20 September to 4 October 1943. Drawing on his recent work with blast waves and shaped charges used in armor-piercing shells, he suggested using a high-explosive shaped charge to implode a spherical core. A meeting of the Governing Board on 23 September resolved to approach George Kistiakowsky, a renowned expert on explosives then working for OSRD, to join the Los Alamos Laboratory. Although reluctant, he did so in November. He became a full-time staff member on 16 February 1944, becoming Parsons' deputy for implosion; McMillan became his deputy for the gun-type. The maximum size of the bomb was determined at this time from the size of the 5-by-12-foot (1.5 by 3.7 m) bomb bay of the B-29.

An implosion-type nuclear bomb. In the center is the neutron initiator (red). It is surrounded by the plutonium hemispheres. There is a small air gap (white, not in the original Fat Man design) and then the uranium tamper. Around that is the aluminium pusher (purple). This is encased in the explosive lenses (gold). Colors are the same as in the diagram opposite.

By July 1944, Oppenheimer had concluded that plutonium could not be used in a gun design. On July 18, he wrote to Groves that "at the present time the method to which an over-riding priority must be assigned is the method of implosion." The accelerated effort on an implosion design, codenamed Fat Man, began in August 1944 when Oppenheimer implemented a sweeping reorganization of the Los Alamos laboratory to focus on implosion. Two new groups were created at Los Alamos to develop the implosion weapon, X (for explosives) Division headed by Kistiakowsky and G (for gadget) Division under Robert Bacher. Although Teller was head of the T-1 (Implosion and Super) Group, Bethe considered that Teller was spending too much time on the Super, which had been given a low priority by Bethe and Oppenheimer. In June 1944, Oppenheimer created a dedicated Super Group under Teller, who was made directly responsible to Oppenheimer, and Peierls became head of the T-1 (Implosion) Group. In September, Teller's group became the F-1 (Super and General Theory) Group, part of the Enrico Fermi's new F (Fermi) Division.

The new design that von Neumann and T Division, most notably Rudolf Peierls, devised used explosive lenses to focus the explosion onto a spherical shape using a combination of both slow and fast high explosives. A visit by Sir Geoffrey Taylor in May 1944 raised questions about the stability of the interface between the core and the depleted uranium tamper. As a result, the design was made more conservative. The ultimate expression of this was the adoption of Christy's proposal that the core be solid instead of hollow. The design of lenses that detonated with the proper shape and velocity turned out to be slow, difficult and frustrating. Various explosives were tested before settling on composition B as the fast explosive and baratol as the slow explosive. The final design resembled a soccer ball, with 20 hexagonal and 12 pentagonal lenses, each weighing about 80 pounds (36 kg). Getting the detonation just right required fast, reliable and safe electrical detonators, of which there were two for each lens for reliability. It was therefore decided to use exploding-bridgewire detonators, a new invention developed at Los Alamos by a group led by Luis Alvarez. A contract for their manufacture was given to Raytheon.

To study the behavior of converging shock waves, Robert Serber devised the RaLa Experiment, which used the short-lived radioisotope lanthanum-140, a potent source of gamma radiation. The gamma ray source was placed in the center of a metal sphere surrounded by the explosive lenses, which in turn were inside in an ionization chamber. This allowed the taking of an X-ray movie of the implosion. The lenses were designed primarily using this series of tests. In his history of the Los Alamos project, David Hawkins wrote: "RaLa became the most important single experiment affecting the final bomb design".

Within the explosives was the 4.5-inch (110 mm) thick aluminum pusher, which provided a smooth transition from the relatively low density explosive to the next layer, the 3-inch (76 mm) thick tamper of natural uranium. Its main job was to hold the critical mass together as long as possible, but it would also reflect neutrons back into the core. Some part of it might fission as well. To prevent predetonation by an external neutron, the tamper was coated in a thin layer of boron.

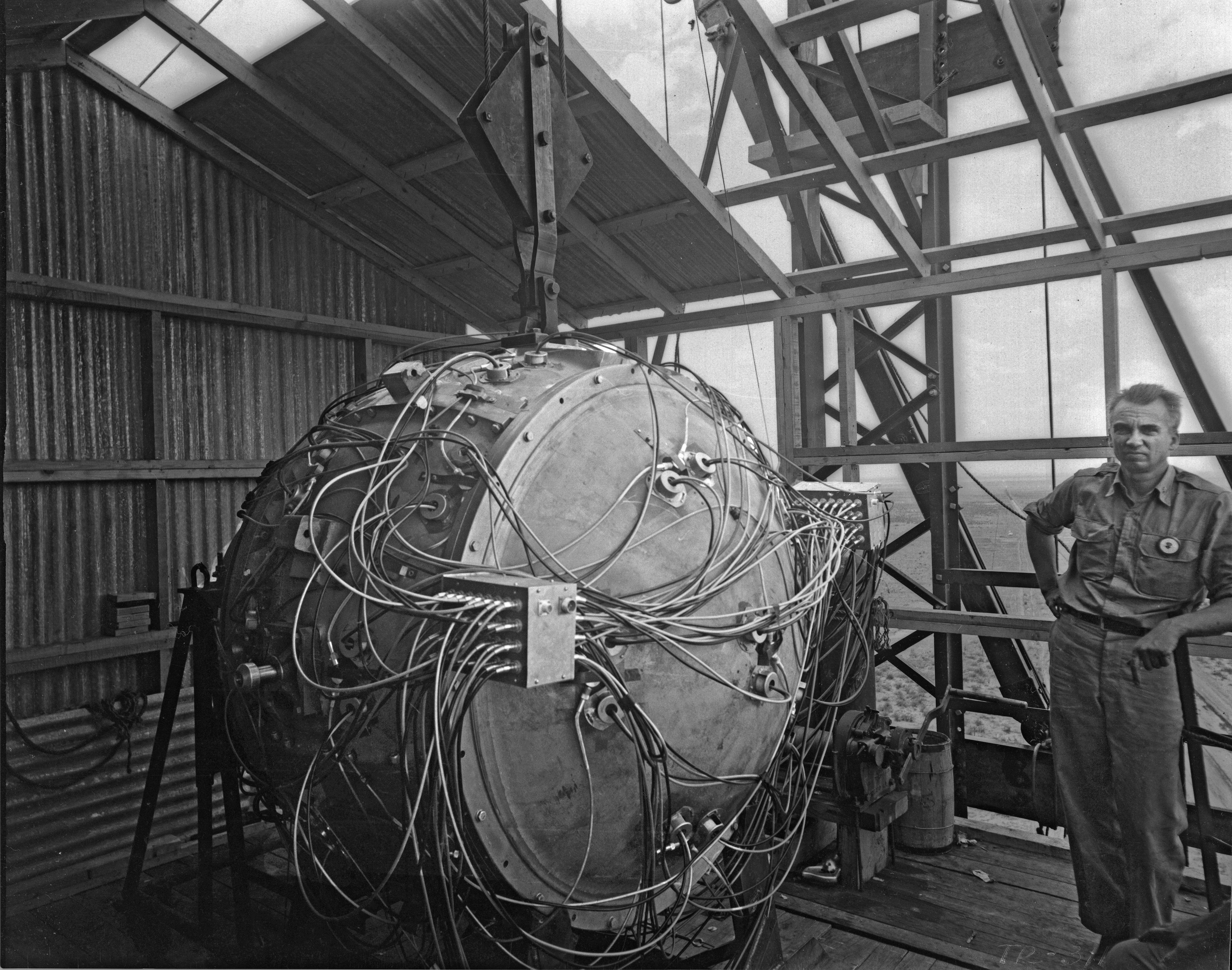
Norris Bradbury, group leader for bomb assembly, stands next to the partially assembled Gadget atop the Trinity test tower. Later, he became the director of Los Alamos vice Oppenheimer.

A polonium-beryllium modulated neutron initiator, known as an "urchin" because its shape resembled the inner shell of a sea urchin, was developed to start the chain reaction at precisely the right moment. This work with the chemistry and metallurgy of radioactive polonium was directed by Charles Allen Thomas of the Monsanto Company and became known as the Dayton Project. Testing required up to 500 curies per month of polonium, which Monsanto was able to deliver. The whole assembly was encased in a duralumin bomb casing to protect it from bullets and flak.

The ultimate task of the metallurgists was to determine how to cast plutonium into a sphere. The brittle α phase that exists at room temperature changes to the plastic β phase at higher temperatures. Attention then shifted to the even more malleable δ phase that normally exists in the 300 to 450 °C (572 to 842 °F) range. It was found that this was stable at room temperature when alloyed with aluminum, but aluminum emits neutrons when bombarded with alpha particles, which would exacerbate the pre-ignition problem. The metallurgists then hit upon a plutonium–gallium alloy, which stabilized the δ phase and could be hot pressed into the desired spherical shape. As plutonium was found to corrode readily, the sphere was coated with nickel.

The work proved dangerous. By the end of the war, half the experienced chemists and metallurgists had to be removed from work with plutonium when unacceptably high levels of the element appeared in their urine. A minor fire at Los Alamos in January 1945 led to a fear that a fire in the plutonium laboratory might contaminate the whole town, and Groves authorized the construction of a new facility for plutonium chemistry and metallurgy, which became known as the DP-site. The hemispheres for the first plutonium pit (or core) were produced and delivered on 2 July 1945. Three more hemispheres followed on 23 July and were delivered three days later.

== Little Boy ==
Following Oppenheimer's reorganization of the Los Alamos Laboratory in July 1944, the work on the uranium gun-type weapon was concentrated in Francis Birch's O-1 (Gun) Group. The concept was pursued so that in case of a failure to develop an implosion bomb, at least the enriched uranium could be used. Henceforth the gun-type had to work with enriched uranium only, and this allowed the Thin Man design to be greatly simplified. A high-velocity gun was no longer required, and a simpler weapon could be substituted, one short enough to fit into a B-29 bomb bay. The new design was called Little Boy.

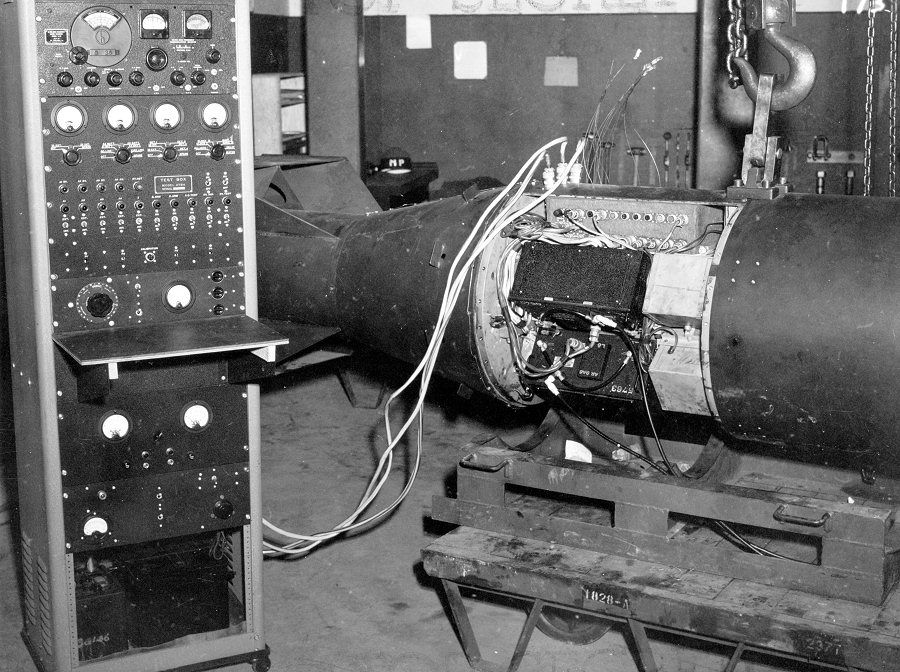
A Little Boy unit on Tinian connected to test equipment, possibly to test or charge components within the device

After repeated slippages, the first shipment of slightly enriched uranium (13 to 15 percent uranium-235) arrived from Oak Ridge in March 1944. Shipments of highly enriched uranium commenced in June 1944. Criticality experiments and the Water Boiler had priority, so the metallurgists did not receive any until August 1944. In the meantime, the CM Division experimented with uranium hydride. This was considered by T Division as a prospective active material. The idea was that the hydrogen's ability as a neutron moderator would compensate for the loss of efficiency, but, as Bethe later recalled, its efficiency was "negligible or less, as Feynman would say", and the idea was dropped by August 1944.

Frank Spedding's Ames Project had developed the Ames process, a method of producing uranium metal on an industrial scale, but Cyril Stanley Smith, the CM Division's associate leader in charge of metallurgy, was concerned about using it with highly enriched uranium due to the danger of forming a critical mass. Highly enriched uranium was also far more valuable than natural uranium, and he wanted to avoid the loss of even a milligram. He recruited Richard D. Baker, a chemist who had worked with Spedding, and together they adapted the Ames Process for use at the Los Alamos laboratory. In February Baker and his group made twenty 360 gram reductions and twenty-seven 500 gram reductions with highly enriched uranium tetrafluoride.

Two types of gun design were produced: Type A was of high alloy steel, and Type B of more ordinary steel. Type B was chosen for production because it was lighter. The primers and propellant were the same as those previously chosen for Thin Man. Scale test firing of the hollow projectile and target insert was conducted with the 3-inch/50 caliber gun and a 20 mm (0.79 in) Hispano cannon. Starting in December, test firing was done full-scale. Amazingly, the first test case produced turned out to be the best ever made. It was used in four test firings at the Anchor Ranch, and ultimately in the Little Boy used in the bombing of Hiroshima. The design specifications were completed in February 1945, and contracts were let to build the components. Three different plants were used so that no one would have a copy of the complete design. The gun and breech were made by the Naval Gun Factory in Washington, D.C.; the target, case and some other components were by the Naval Ordnance Plant in Center Line, Michigan; and the tail fairing and mounting brackets by the Expert Tool and Die Company in Detroit, Michigan.

Birch's tidy schedule was disrupted in December by Groves, who ordered Oppenheimer to give priority to the gun-type over implosion, so that the weapon would be ready by 1 July 1945. The bomb, except for the uranium payload, was ready at the beginning of May 1945. The uranium-235 projectile was completed on 15 June, and the target on 24 July. The target and bomb pre-assemblies (partly assembled bombs without the fissile components) left Hunters Point Naval Shipyard, California, on 16 July aboard the cruiser USS Indianapolis, arriving 26 July. The target inserts followed by air on 30 July.

Although all of its components had been tested in target and drop tests, no full test of a gun-type nuclear weapon occurred before Hiroshima. There were several reasons for not testing a Little Boy type of device. Primarily, there was insufficient uranium-235. Additionally, the weapon design was simple enough that it was only deemed necessary to do laboratory tests with the gun-type assembly. Unlike the implosion design, which required sophisticated coordination of shaped explosive charges, the gun-type design was considered almost certain to work. Thirty-two drop tests were conducted at Wendover, and only once did the bomb fail to fire. One last-minute modification was made, to allow the powder bags of propellant that fired the gun to be loaded in the bomb bay.

The danger of accidental detonation made safety a concern. Little Boy incorporated basic safety mechanisms, but an accidental detonation could still occur. Tests were conducted to see whether a crash could drive the hollow "bullet" onto the "target" cylinder resulting in a massive release of radiation, or possibly nuclear detonation. These showed that this required an impact of 500 times that of gravity, which made it highly unlikely. There was still concern that a crash and a fire could trigger the explosives. If immersed in water, the uranium halves were subject to a neutron moderator effect. While this would not have caused an explosion, it could have created widespread radioactive contamination. For this reason, pilots were advised to crash on land rather than at sea.

== Water boiler ==
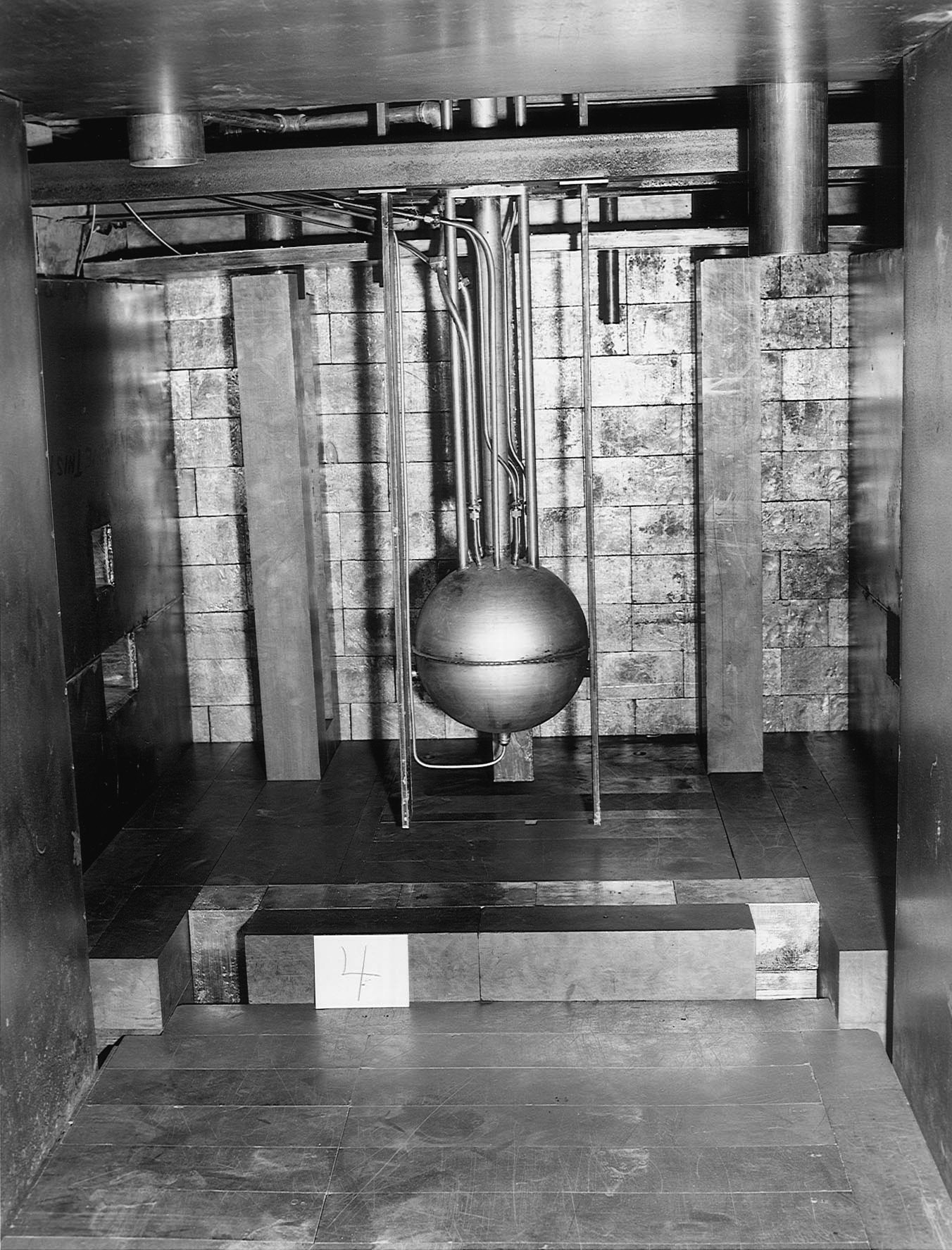
Water Boiler

The Water Boiler was an aqueous homogeneous reactor, a type of nuclear reactor in which the nuclear fuel in the form of soluble uranium sulfate is dissolved in water. Uranium sulfate was chosen instead of uranium nitrate because sulfur's neutron capture cross section is less than that of nitrogen. The project was proposed by Bacher in April 1943 as part of an ongoing program of measuring critical masses in chain-reacting systems. He saw it also as a means of testing various materials in critical mass systems. T Division were opposed to the project, which was seen as a distraction from studies related to the form of chain reactions found in an atomic bomb, but Bacher prevailed on this point. Calculations related to the Water Boiler did take up an inordinate amount of T Division's time in 1943. The reactor theory developed by Fermi did not apply to the Water Boiler.

Little was known about building reactors in 1943. A group was created in Bacher's P Division, the P-7 (Water Boiler) Group, under the leadership of Donald Kerst, that included Charles P. Baker, Gerhart Friedlander, Lindsay Helmholz, Marshall Holloway and Raemer Schreiber. Robert F. Christy from the T-1 Group provided support with the theoretical calculations, in particular, a calculation of the critical mass. He calculated that 600 grams of uranium-235 would form a critical mass in a tamper of infinite size. Initially it was planned to operate the Water Boiler at 10 kW, but Fermi and Samuel K. Allison visited in September 1943, and went over the proposed design. They pointed out the danger of decomposition of the uranium salt, and recommended heavier shielding. It was also noted that radioactive fission products would be created that would have to be chemically removed. As a consequence, it was decided that the Water Boiler would only run at 1 kW until more operating experience had been accumulated, and features needed for high power operation were shelved for the time being.

Christy also calculated the area that would become contaminated if an accidental explosion occurred. A site in Los Alamos Canyon was selected that was a safe distance from the township and downstream from the water supply. Known as Omega, it was approved by the Governing Board on 19 August 1943. The Water Boiler was not simple to construct. The two halves of the 12.0625-inch (306.39 mm) stainless steel sphere that was the boiler had to be arc welded because solder would be corroded by the uranium salt. The CM-7 (Miscellaneous Metallurgy) Group produced beryllia bricks for the Water Boiler's tamper in December 1943 and January 1944. They were hot pressed in graphite at 1,000 °C (1,830 °F) at 100 pounds per square inch (690 kPa) for 5 to 20 minutes. Some 53 bricks were made, shaped to fit around the boiler. The building at Omega Site was ready, if incomplete, by 1 February 1944, and the Water Boiler was fully assembled by 1 April. Sufficient enriched uranium had arrived by May to start it up, and it went critical on 9 May 1944. It was only the third reactor in the world to do so, the first two being the Chicago Pile-1 reactor at the Metallurgical Laboratory and the X-10 Graphite Reactor at the Clinton Engineer Works. Improved cross-section measurements allowed Christy to refine his criticality estimate to 575 grams. In fact, only 565 grams were required. The accuracy of his prediction surprised Christy more than anyone.

In September 1944, the P-7 (Water Boiler) Group became the F-2 (Water Boiler) Group, part of Fermi's F Division. On completion of the planned series of experiments in June 1944, it was decided to rebuild it as a more powerful reactor. The original goal of 10 kW power was discarded in favor of 5 kW, which would keep the cooling requirements simple. It was estimated that it would have a neutron flux of 5 × 10^{10} neutrons per square centimeter per second. Water cooling was installed, along with additional control rods. This time uranium nitrate was used instead of uranium sulfate because the former could more easily be decontaminated. The tamper of beryllia bricks was surrounded with graphite blocks, as beryllia was hard to procure, and to avoid the (γ, n) reaction in the beryllium, in which gamma rays produced by the reactor-generated neutrons:

^{9}_{4}Be + γ → ^{8}_{4}Be + n - 1.66 MeV

The reactor commenced operation in December 1944.

== Super ==
From the first, research into the Super was directed by Teller, who was its most enthusiastic proponent. Although this work was always considered secondary to the objective of developing a fission bomb, the prospect of creating more powerful bombs was sufficient to keep it going. The Berkeley summer conference had convinced Teller that the Super was technologically feasible. An important contribution was made by Emil Konopinski, who suggested that deuterium could more easily be ignited if it was mixed with tritium. Bethe noted that a tritium-deuterium (T-D) reaction releases five times as much energy as a deuterium-deuterium (D-D) reaction. This was not immediately followed up, because tritium was hard to obtain, and there were hopes that deuterium could be easily ignited by a fission bomb, but the cross sections of T-D and D-D were measured by Manley's group in Chicago and Holloway's at Purdue.

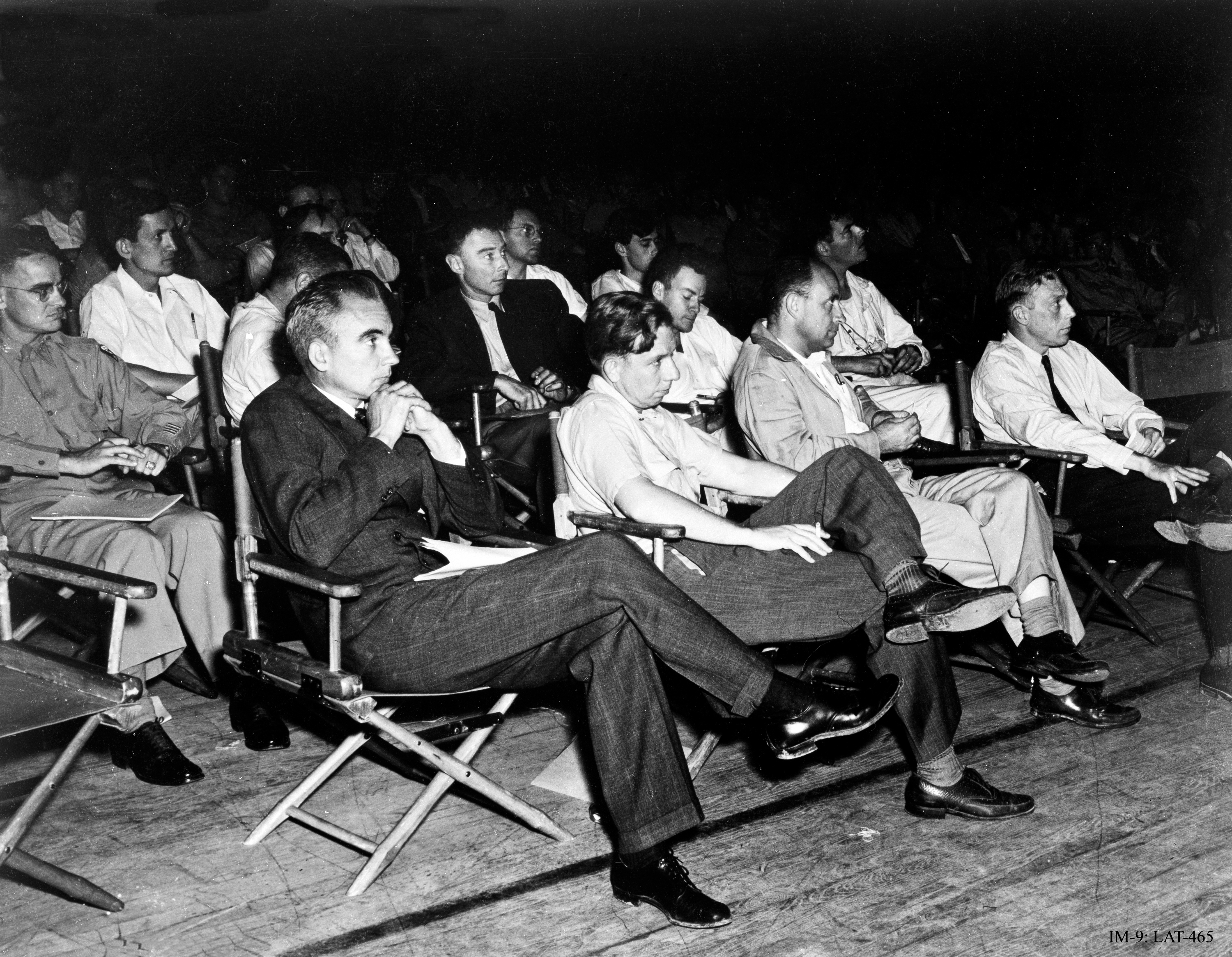
The April 1946 colloquium on the Super. In the front row are (left to right) Norris Bradbury, John Manley, Enrico Fermi and J. M. B. Kellogg. Robert Oppenheimer, in dark coat, is behind Manley; to Oppenheimer's left is Richard Feynman. The Army officer on the left is Colonel Oliver Haywood.

By September 1943, the values of the D-D and T-D had been revised upwards, raising hopes that a fusion reaction could be started at lower temperatures. Teller was sufficiently optimistic about the Super, and sufficiently concerned about reports that the Germans were interested in deuterium, to ask the Governing Board to raise its priority. The board agreed to some extent, but ruled that only one person could be spared to work on it full-time. Oppenheimer designated Konopinski, who would spend the rest of the war working on it. Nonetheless, in February 1944, Teller added Stanislaw Ulam, Jane Roberg, Geoffrey Chew, and Harold and Mary Argo to his T-1 Group. Ulam calculated the inverse Compton cooling, while Roberg worked out the ignition temperature of T-D mixtures. Maria Goeppert joined the group in February 1945.

Teller argued for an increase in resources for Super research on the basis that it appeared to be far more difficult than anticipated. The board declined to do so, on the grounds that it was unlikely to bear fruit before the war ended, but did not cut it entirely. Indeed, Oppenheimer asked Groves to breed some tritium from deuterium in the X-10 Graphite Reactor. For some months Teller and Bethe argued about the priority of the Super research. In June 1944, Oppenheimer removed Teller and his Super Group from Bethe's T Division and placed it directly under himself. In September, it became the F-1 (Super) Group in Fermi' s F Division. Over the following months, Super research continued unabated. It was calculated that burning 1 cubic meter (35 cu ft) of liquid deuterium would release the energy of 10 megatonnes of TNT (42 PJ), enough to devastate 1,000 square miles (2,600 km^{2}). The Super Group was transferred back to T Division on 14 November 1945.

A colloquium on the Super was held at the Los Alamos Laboratory in April 1946 to review the work done during the war. Teller gave an outline of his "Classic Super" concept, and Nicholas Metropolis and Anthony L. Turkevich presented the results of calculations that had been made concerning thermonuclear reactions. The final report on the Super, issued in June and prepared by Teller and his group, remained upbeat about the prospect of the Super being successfully developed, although that impression was not universal among those present at the colloquium. Work had to be curtailed in June 1946 due to the loss of staff. By 1950, calculations would show that the Classic Super would not work; that it would not only be unable to sustain thermonuclear burning in the deuterium fuel, but would be unable to ignite it in the first place.

== Trinity ==
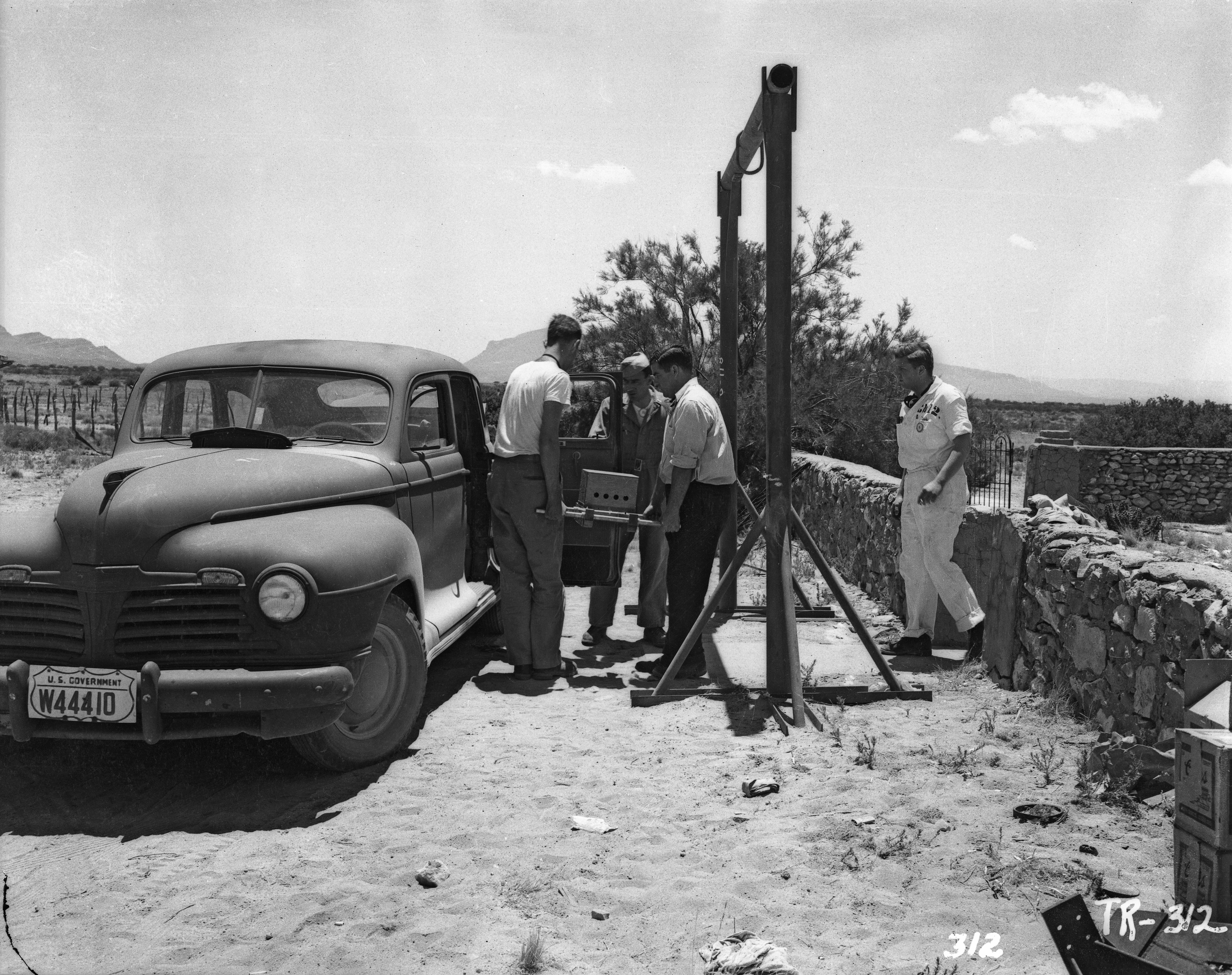
Herbert Lehr and Harry Daghlian loading the assembled tamper plug containing the plutonium pit and initiator into a sedan for transport from the McDonald Ranch House to the Trinity shot tower

Because of the complexity of an implosion-style weapon, it was decided that, despite the waste of fissile material, an initial test would be required. Groves approved the test, subject to the active material being recovered. Consideration was therefore given to a controlled fizzle, but Oppenheimer opted instead for a full-scale nuclear test, codenamed "Trinity". In March 1944, responsibility for planning the test was assigned to Kenneth Bainbridge, a professor of physics at Harvard, working under Kistiakowsky. Bainbridge selected the bombing range near Alamogordo Army Airfield as the site for the test. Bainbridge worked with Captain Samuel P. Davalos on the construction of the Trinity Base Camp and its facilities, which included barracks, warehouses, workshops, an explosive magazine and a commissary.

Groves did not relish the prospect of explaining the loss of a billion dollars' worth of plutonium to a Senate committee, so a cylindrical containment vessel codenamed "Jumbo" was constructed to recover the active material in the event of a failure. Measuring 25 feet (7.6 m) long and 12 feet (3.7 m) wide, it was fabricated at great expense from 214 long tons (217 t) of iron and steel by Babcock & Wilcox in Barberton, Ohio. Brought in a special railroad car to a siding in Pope, New Mexico, it was transported the last 25 miles (40 km) to the test site on a trailer pulled by two tractors. By the time it arrived, confidence in the implosion method was high enough, and the availability of plutonium was sufficient, that Oppenheimer decided not to use it. Instead, it was placed atop a steel tower 800 yards (730 m) from the weapon as a rough measure of how powerful the explosion would be. In the end, Jumbo survived, although its tower did not, adding credence to the belief that Jumbo would have successfully contained a fizzled explosion.

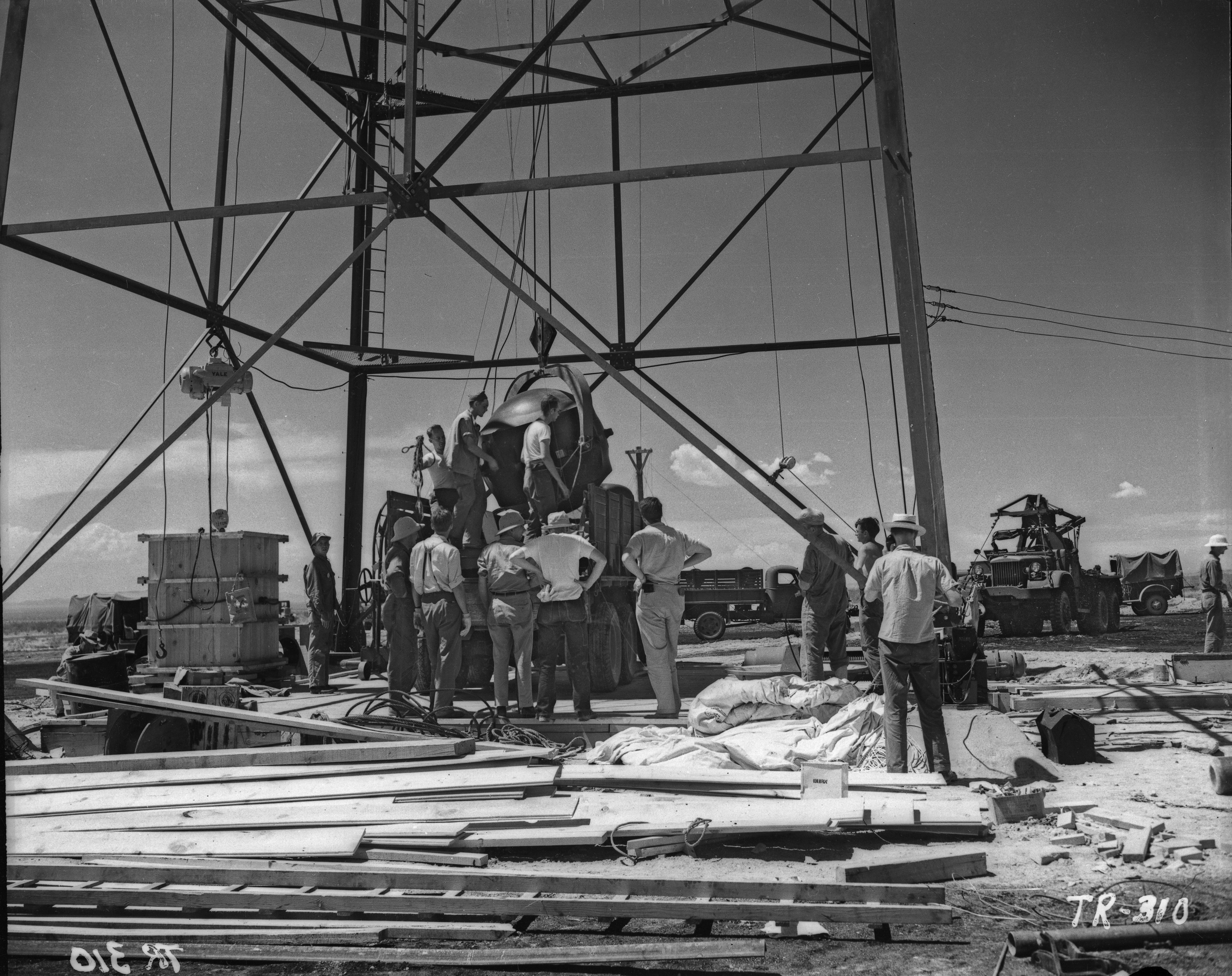
The explosives of "the gadget" were raised to the top of the tower for the final assembly.

A pre-test explosion was conducted on 7 May 1945 to calibrate the instruments. A wooden test platform was erected 800 yards (730 m) from Ground Zero and piled with 108 short tons (98 t) of TNT spiked with nuclear fission products in the form of an irradiated uranium slug from the Hanford Site, which was dissolved and poured into tubing inside the explosive. This explosion was observed by Oppenheimer and Groves's new deputy commander, Brigadier General Thomas Farrell. The pre-test produced data that proved vital for the Trinity test.

For the actual test, the device, nicknamed "the gadget", was hoisted to the top of a 100-foot (30 m) steel tower, as detonation at that height would give a better indication of how the weapon would behave when dropped from a bomber. Detonation in the air maximized the energy applied directly to the target, and generated less nuclear fallout. The gadget was assembled under the supervision of Norris Bradbury at the nearby McDonald Ranch House on 13 July, and precariously winched up the tower the following day. Observers included Bush, Chadwick, Conant, Farrell, Fermi, Groves, Lawrence, Oppenheimer and Tolman.

At 05:30 on 16 July 1945 the gadget exploded with an energy equivalent of around 20 kilotons of TNT, leaving a crater of Trinitite (radioactive glass) in the desert 250 feet (76 m) wide. The shock wave was felt over 100 miles (160 km) away, and the mushroom cloud reached 7.5 miles (12.1 km) in height. It was heard as far away as El Paso, Texas, so Groves issued a cover story about an ammunition magazine explosion at Alamogordo Field. William L. Laurence of The New York Times served as the Manhattan Project's press officer, helped put together the cover-story, including another press release in case of his own death. The media statement was issued by the Second Air Force. The media would later be invited to the site in September 1945 following the bombing of Hiroshima and Nagasaki.

== Project Alberta ==
Project Alberta, also known as Project A, was formed in March 1945, absorbing existing groups of Parsons's O Division that were working on bomb preparation and delivery. These included Ramsey's O-2 (Delivery) Group, Birch's O-1 (Gun) Group, Bainbridge's X-2 (Development, Engineering, and Tests) Group, Brode's O-3 (Fuse Development) Group and George Galloway's O-4 (Engineering) Group. Its role was to support the bomb delivery effort. Parsons became the head of Project Alberta, with Ramsey as his scientific and technical deputy, and Ashworth as his operations officer and military alternate. In all, Project Alberta consisted of 51 Army, Navy and civilian personnel. The 1st Technical Service Detachment, to which the personnel of Project Alberta were administratively assigned, was commanded by Lieutenant Colonel Peer de Silva, and provided security and housing services on Tinian. There were two bomb assembly teams, a Fat Man Assembly Team under Commander Norris Bradbury and Roger Warner, and a Little Boy Assembly Team under Birch. Philip Morrison was the head of the Pit Crew, Bernard Waldman and Luis Alvarez led the Aerial Observation Team, and Sheldon Dike was in charge of the Aircraft Ordnance Team. Physicists Robert Serber and William Penney, and US Army Captain James F. Nolan, a medical expert, were special consultants. All members of Project Alberta had volunteered for the mission.

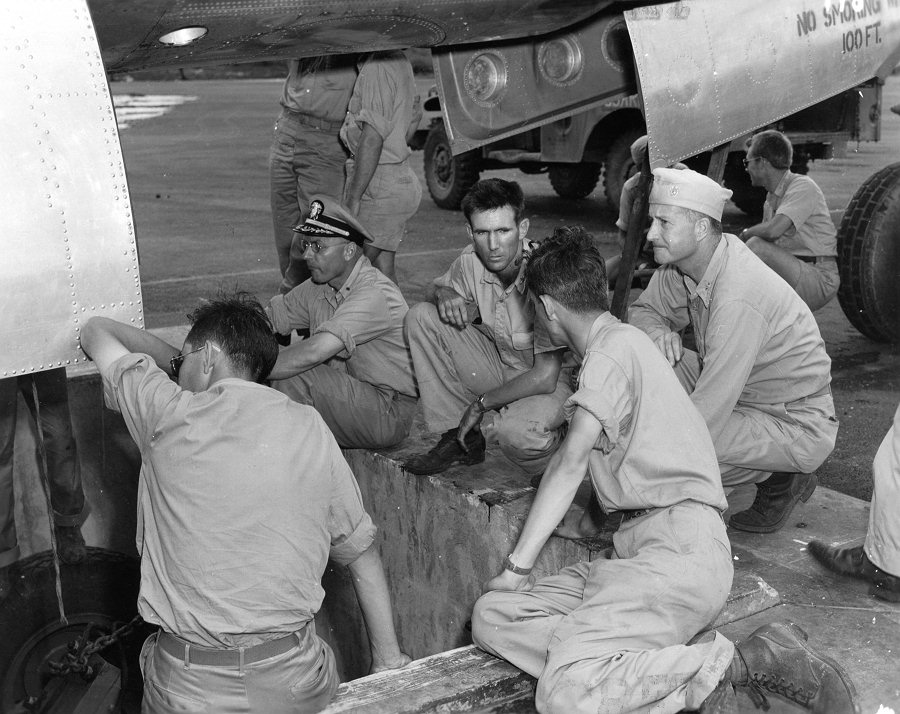
Deak Parsons (right) supervises loading the Little Boy bomb into the B-29 Enola Gay. Norman Ramsey is on his left, with his back to the camera.

Project Alberta proceeded with the plan to have the Little Boy ready by 1 August, and the first Fat Man ready for use as soon as possible after that. In the meantime, a series of twelve combat missions were flown between 20 and 29 July against targets in Japan using high-explosive pumpkin bombs, versions of the Fat Man with the explosives, but not the fissile core. Project Alberta's Sheldon Dike and Milo Bolstead flew on some of these missions, as did the British observer Group Captain Leonard Cheshire. Four Little Boy pre-assemblies, L-1, L-2, L-5 and L-6 were expended in test drops. The Little Boy team had the live bomb completely assembled and ready for use on 31 July. The final item of preparation for the operation came on 29 July 1945. Orders for the attack were issued to General Carl Spaatz on 25 July under the signature of General Thomas T. Handy, the acting Chief of Staff of the United States Army, since General of the Army George C. Marshall was at the Potsdam Conference with President Harry S. Truman. The order designated four targets: Hiroshima, Kokura, Niigata, and Nagasaki, and ordered the attack to be made "as soon as weather will permit after about 3 August".

Assembly of a Fat Man unit was a complex operation involving personnel from the High Explosive, Pit, Fusing and Firing teams. To prevent the assembly building from becoming overcrowded and thereby causing an accident, Parsons limited the numbers allowed inside at any time. Personnel waiting to perform a specific task had to wait their turn outside the building. The first Fat Man pre-assembly, known as F13, was assembled by 31 July, and expended in a drop test the next day. This was followed by F18 on 4 August, which was dropped the next day. Three sets of Fat Man pre-assemblies, designated F31, F32, and F33, arrived on B-29s of the 509th Composite Group and 216th Army Air Forces Base Unit on 2 August. On inspection, the high explosive blocks of F32 were found to be badly cracked and unserviceable. The other two were assembled, with F33 earmarked for a rehearsal and F31 for operational use.

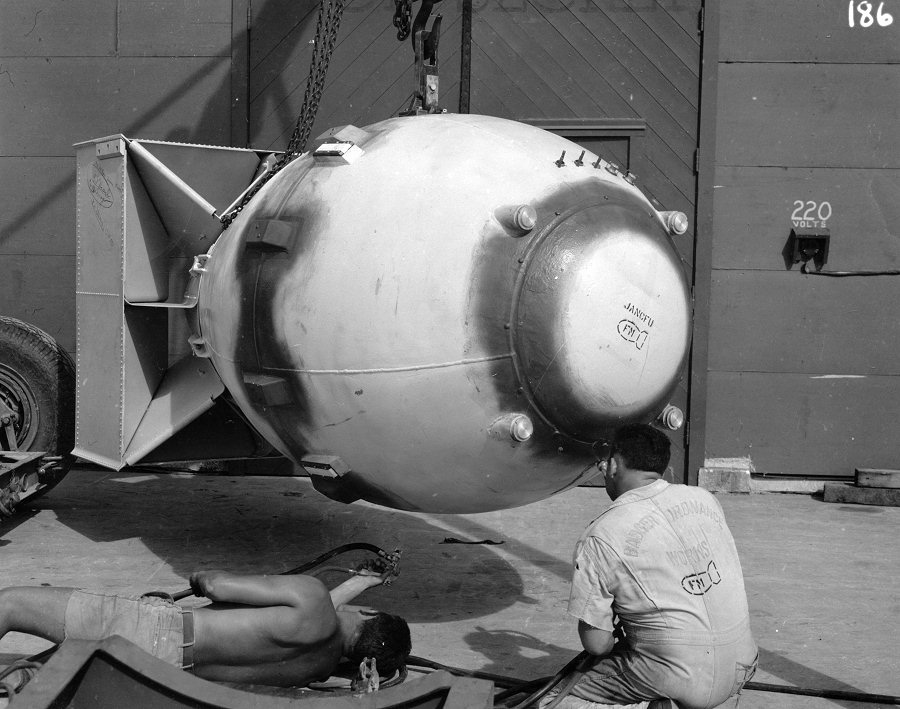
Fat Man bomb, with liquid asphalt sealant sprayed on the casing's seams, is readied on Tinian.

Parsons, as the weaponeer, was in command of the Hiroshima mission. With Second Lieutenant Morris R. Jeppson of the 1st Ordnance Squadron, he inserted the Little Boy's powder bags in the Enola Gay's bomb bay in flight. Before climbing to altitude on approach to the target, Jeppson switched the three safety plugs between the electrical connectors of the internal battery and the firing mechanism from green to red. The bomb was then fully armed. Jeppson monitored its circuits. Four other members of Project Alberta flew on the Hiroshima mission. Luis Alvarez, Harold Agnew and Lawrence H. Johnston were on the instrument plane The Great Artiste. They dropped "Bangometer" canisters to measure the force of the blast, but this was not used to calculate the yield at the time. Bernard Waldman was the camera operator on the observation aircraft. He was equipped with a special high-speed Fastax movie camera with six seconds of film in order to record the blast. Waldman forgot to open the camera shutter, and no film was exposed. Other members of the team flew to Iwo Jima in case Enola Gay was forced to land there, but this was not required.

Purnell, Parsons, Paul Tibbets, Spaatz and Curtis LeMay met on Guam on 7 August, the day after the Hiroshima attack, to discuss what should be done next. Parsons said that Project Alberta would have a Fat Man bomb ready by 11 August, as originally planned, but Tibbets pointed to weather reports indicating poor flying conditions on that day due to a storm, and asked if it could be readied by 9 August. Parsons agreed to do so. For this mission, Ashworth was the weaponeer, with Lieutenant Philip M. Barnes, of the 1st Ordnance Squadron as assistant weaponeer on the B-29 Bockscar. Walter Goodman and Lawrence H. Johnston were on board the instrumentation aircraft, The Great Artiste. Leonard Cheshire and William Penney were on the observation plane Big Stink. Robert Serber was supposed to be on board but was left behind by the aircraft commander because he had forgotten his parachute.

== Health and safety ==
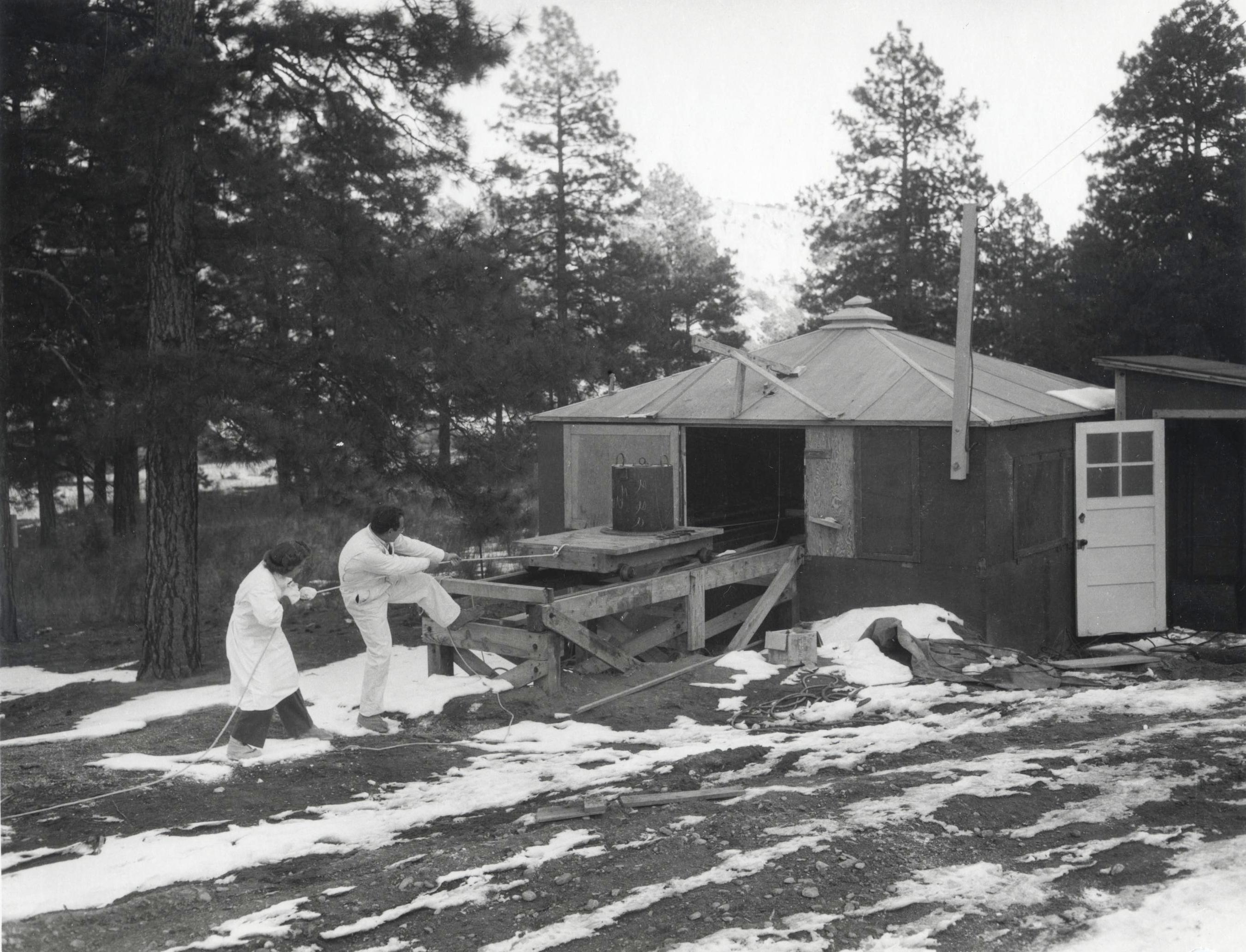
Remote handling of a kilocurie source of radiolanthanum for a RaLa Experiment at Los Alamos

A medical program was established at Los Alamos under Captain James Findley Nolan of the United States Army Medical Corps. Initially, a small five-bed infirmary was established for civilians, and a three-bed infirmary for military personnel. More serious cases were handled by the Army's Bruns General Hospital in Santa Fe, but this was soon regarded as unsatisfactory due to the loss of time due to the long trip, and security risks. Nolan recommended that the infirmaries be consolidated and expanded into a 60-bed hospital. A 54-bed hospital was opened in 1944, staffed by Army personnel. A dentist arrived in March 1944. A Veterinary Corps officer, Captain J. Stevenson, had already been assigned to look after the guard dogs.

Laboratory facilities for medical research were limited, but some research was conducted into the effects of radiation, and the absorption and toxic effects of metals, particularly plutonium and beryllium, mainly as a result of accidents. The Health Group began conducting urine tests of laboratory workers in early 1945, and many of these revealed dangerous levels of plutonium. Work on the Water Boiler also occasionally exposed workers to dangerous fission products. There were 24 fatal accidents at Los Alamos between its opening in 1943 and September 1946, most involving construction workers. Four scientists died, including Harry Daghlian and Louis Slotin in criticality accidents involving the demon core.

== Security ==
On 10 March 1945, a Japanese fire balloon struck a power line, and the resulting power surge caused the Manhattan Project's reactors at the Hanford site to be temporarily shut down. This generated great concern at Los Alamos that the site might come under attack. One night found everyone staring at a strange light in the sky. Oppenheimer later recalled this demonstrated that "even a group of scientists is not proof against the errors of suggestion and hysteria".

With so many people involved, security was a difficult task. A special Counter Intelligence Corps detachment was formed to handle the Manhattan Project's security issues. By 1943, it was clear that the Soviet Union was attempting to penetrate the project. The most successful Soviet spy was Klaus Fuchs of the British Mission. The 1950 revelation of his espionage activities damaged the United States's nuclear cooperation with Britain and Canada. Subsequently, other instances of espionage were uncovered, leading to the arrest of Harry Gold, David Greenglass and Ethel and Julius Rosenberg. Other spies like Theodore Hall remained unknown for decades.

== Post-war ==
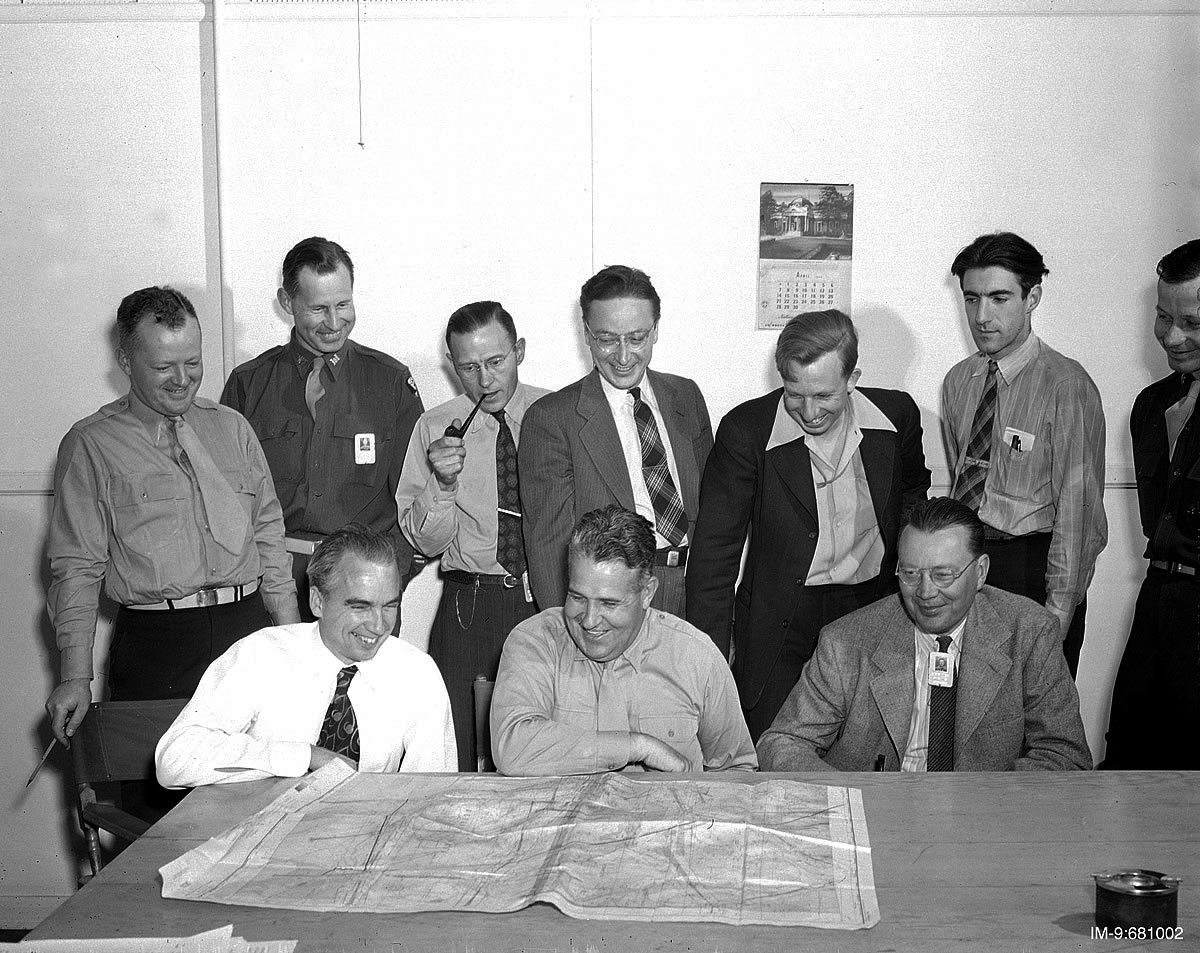
Bradbury (left) examines plans for new laboratory sites and permanent housing with Leslie Groves of the Armed Forces Special Weapons Project (center) and Eric Jette (right) in April 1947; Colonel Lyle E. Seeman stands behind Bradbury, second from the left.

After the war ended on 14 August 1945, Oppenheimer informed Groves of his intention to resign as director of the Los Alamos Laboratory, but agreed to remain until a suitable replacement could be found. Groves wanted someone with both a solid academic background and a high standing within the project. Oppenheimer recommended Norris Bradbury. This was agreeable to Groves, who liked the fact that as a naval officer Bradbury was both a military man and a scientist. Bradbury accepted the offer on a six-month trial basis. Groves announced this at a meeting of division leaders on 18 September. Parsons arranged for Bradbury to be quickly discharged from the Navy, which awarded him the Legion of Merit for his wartime services. He remained in the Naval Reserve, though, ultimately retiring in 1961 with the rank of captain. On 16 October 1945, there was a ceremony at Los Alamos at which Groves presented the laboratory with the Army-Navy "E" Award, and presented Oppenheimer with a certificate of appreciation. Bradbury became the laboratory's second director the following day.

The first months of Bradbury's directorship were particularly trying. He had hoped that Atomic Energy Act of 1946 would be quickly passed by Congress and the wartime Manhattan Project would be superseded by a new, permanent organization. It soon became clear that this would take more than six months. President Harry S. Truman did not sign the act creating the Atomic Energy Commission into law until 1 August 1946, and it did not become active until 1 January 1947. In the meantime, Groves's legal authority to act was limited.

Most of the scientists at Los Alamos were eager to return to their laboratories and universities, and by February 1946 all of the wartime division heads had left, but a talented core remained. Darol Froman became head of Robert Bacher's G division, now renamed M Division. Eric Jette became responsible for Chemistry and Metallurgy, John H. Manley for Physics, George Placzek for Theory, Max Roy for Explosives, and Roger Wagner for Ordnance. Z Division was created in July 1945 to control testing, stock piling, and bomb assembly activities. It was named after Jerrold R. Zacharias, its leader until 17 October 1945, when he returned to MIT, and was succeeded by Roger S. Warner. It moved to Sandia Base between March and July 1946, except for its Z-4 (Mechanical Engineering) Group, which followed in February 1947.

The number of personnel at the Los Alamos Laboratory plummeted from its wartime peak of over 3,000 to around 1,000, but many were still living in substandard temporary wartime accommodation. Despite the reduced staff, Bradbury still had to provide support for Operation Crossroads, the nuclear tests in the Pacific. Ralph A. Sawyer was appointed the Technical Director with Marshall Holloway from B Division and Roger Warner from Z Division as associate directors. Two ships were assigned for Los Alamos Laboratory personnel, the USS Cumberland Sound and Albemarle. Operation Crossroads cost the Los Alamos Laboratory over one million dollars, and the services of 150 personnel (about one-eighth of its staff) for nine months. As the United States had only about ten atomic bombs in mid-1946 about one fifth of the stockpile was expended.

The Los Alamos Laboratory became the Los Alamos Scientific Laboratory in January 1947. The contract with the University of California that had been negotiated in 1943 allowed the university to terminate it three months after the end of hostilities, and it served notice. There were concerns about the university operating a laboratory outside the state of California. The university was persuaded to rescind its notice, and the operating contract was extended until July 1948. Bradbury would remain director until 1970. The total cost of Project Y up to the end of 1946 was $57.88 million (equivalent to $960 million in 2025).
