= Jane Hamilton Hall =

American physicist

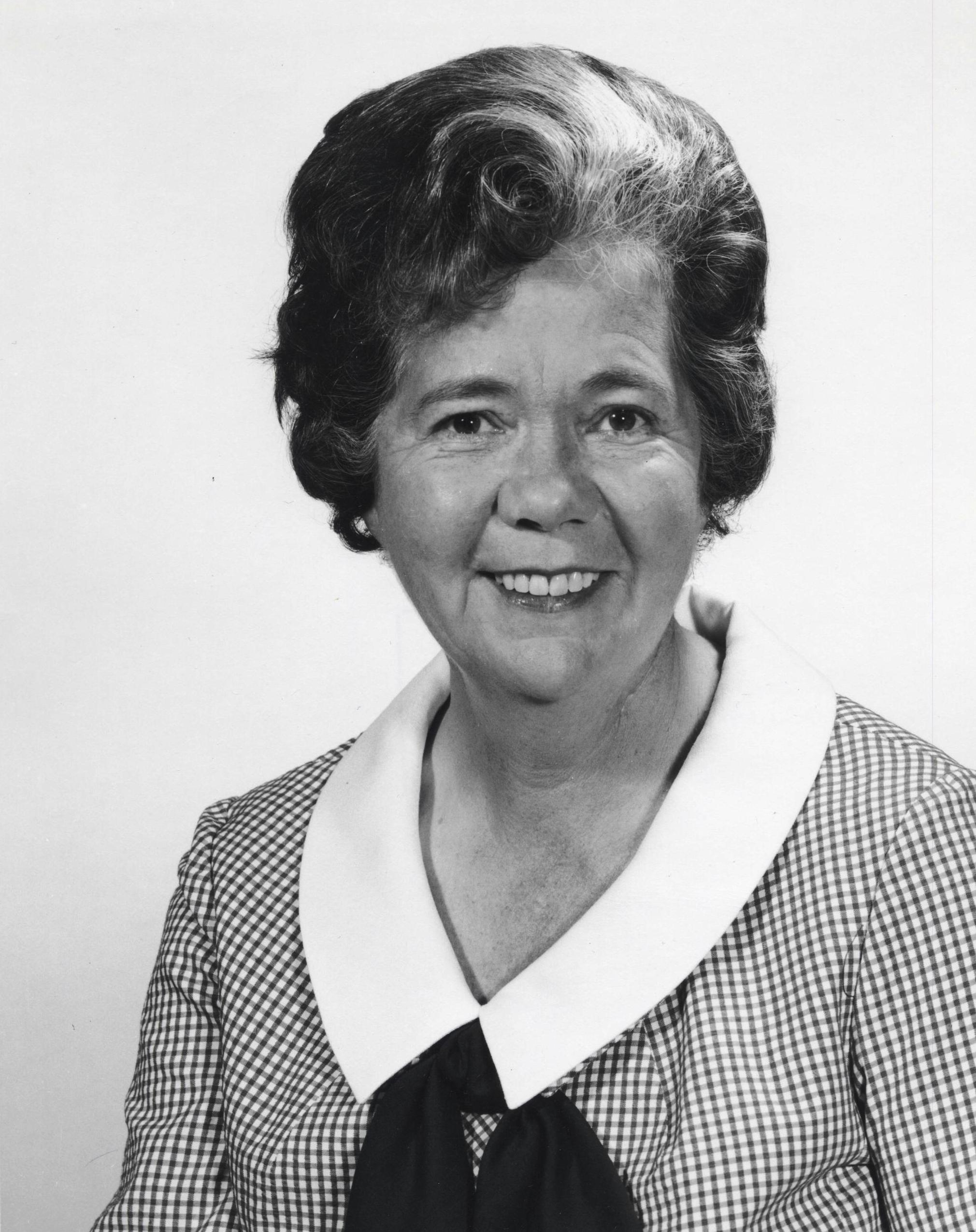
- Born: 23 June 1915; Denver, Colorado
- Died: November 1981 (aged 66)
- Education: University of Chicago
- Awards: Atomic Energy Commission Citation
- Scientific career
- Workplaces: Metallurgical Laboratory; Hanford Engineer Works; Argonne National Laboratory; Los Alamos Laboratory
- Thesis: The temperature diffuse scattering of X-rays by potassium chloride and potassium bromide crystals (1942)

Jane Hamilton Hall (23 June 1915–November 1981) was an American physicist. During World War II she worked on the Manhattan Project. After the war she remained at the Los Alamos National Laboratory, where she oversaw the construction and start up of the Clementine nuclear reactor. She became assistant director of the laboratory in 1958. She was secretary of the General Advisory Committee of the Atomic Energy Commission from 1956 until 1959, and was a member of the committee from 1966 to 1972.

== Biography ==
Jane Hamilton was born in Denver, Colorado, on 23 June 1915. She entered the University of Chicago, where she earned her Bachelor of Science (B.S.) degree in 1937, her Master of Science (M.S.) in 1938, and her doctorate (Ph.D.) in physics in 1942, writing her thesis on "the temperature diffuse scattering of X-rays by potassium chloride and potassium bromide crystals". There, she met and married David B. Hall, a fellow physics student, in 1939. They had two children, Malcolm and Linda. She was a member of Alpha Gamma Delta, an international women's fraternity.

After working for a year as instructors at the University of Denver, they joined the Manhattan Project, the effort during World War II to develop atomic bombs, at its Metallurgical Laboratory at the University of Chicago. Nepotism rules prevented them both working in the same groups together, so while David worked on nuclear reactor design, Hall was assigned to Herbert Parker's Health Physics group, where she soon became head of its Special Studies section. Parker had her investigate the safety aspects of reactors, and she researched the hazards of inhaling plutonium.

Hall was seconded to DuPont, where she became a senior supervisor at the Hanford Engineer Works. Hall and David moved there in mid-1944, and supervised the construction of the B Reactor there, followed by the D and F Reactors. In October 1945, Enrico Fermi brought Hall to the Argonne National Laboratory as an associate physicist and assistant to himself as the laboratory director.

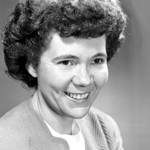
Hall c. 1950

But in November 1945, Hall and David accepted positions at the Los Alamos Laboratory. This was at a low point for the remote laboratory; with the war over most of the scientists working there wanted to return to their universities and laboratories, and were leaving in large numbers. But the laboratory was working on cutting-edge science. They were given the task of supervising the construction and commissioning of the Clementine nuclear reactor. Clementine was the world's first fast reactor, the first to be fueled by plutonium, and the first to use a liquid metal coolant, in this case, mercury. It went critical in 1946, and was used for scientific experiments until 1953, when it was dismantled.

Hall's research interests included nuclear reactor development, X-ray crystallography and neutron physics, and cosmic rays. In 1951 she informed Robert Oppenheimer of the results of the Operation Greenhouse George nuclear test, in which the yield of an atomic bomb was "boosted" by the addition of a small capsule containing less than 1 ounce (28 g) of deuterium and tritium, which nonetheless increased the yield by 25 kilotonnes of TNT (100 TJ).

Hall became associate director of the Los Alamos National Laboratory in 1958. That year she was an American delegate at the Atoms for Peace Conference in Geneva. She was secretary of the General Advisory Committee (GAC) of the Atomic Energy Commission (AEC) from 1956 until 1959, and was a member of the GAC from 1966 to 1972. When President Lyndon Johnson appointed her in 1966, she became the first woman to serve on the GAC. She was also a member of the AEC Advisory committee on Nuclear Materials and Safeguards from 1967 to 1972. She retired from the Los Alamos National Laboratory in 1970. In October of that year, the chairman of the AEC, Glenn Seaborg, presented her with the Atomic Energy Commission Citation and gold medal. She died in November 1981.
