= Plutonium fluoride =

Plutonium fluoride can refer to:

- Plutonium trifluoride, PuF_{3}
- Plutonium tetrafluoride, PuF_{4}
- Plutonium pentafluoride, PuF_{5}
- Plutonium hexafluoride, PuF_{6}
