= Wendover Air Force Base =

Former United States Air Force base in Utah

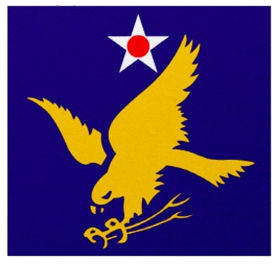
Wendover Air Force Base
- Part of Second Air Force
- Located near: Wendover, Utah
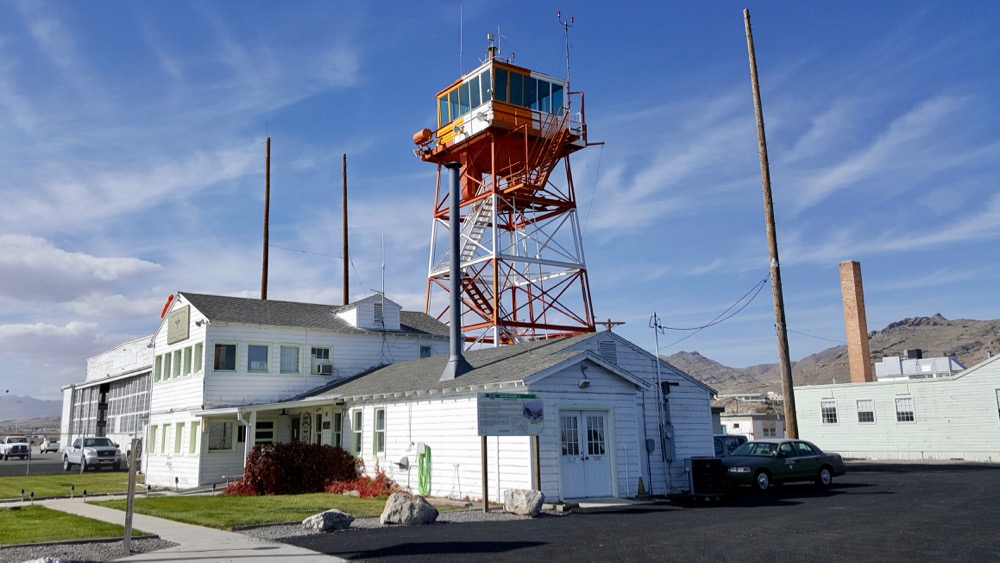
- Tower and operations building

Site information
- Type: Army Airfield/Bombing Range/Test and Development
- Owner: Tooele County, Utah
- Condition: Still in use

Location
- Location within Utah Location within the United States
- Coordinates: 40°43′07″N 114°01′51″W

Site history
- Built: 1940–45
- In use: 1941–1965
- Wendover Air Force Base
- U.S. National Register of Historic Places
- Nearest city: Wendover, Utah
- NRHP reference No.: 75001827
- Added to NRHP: 1 July 1975

Wendover Air Force Base is a former United States Air Force base in Utah now known as Wendover Airport. During World War II, it was a training base for B-17 and B-24 bomber crews. It was the training site of the 509th Composite Group, the B-29 unit that carried out the atomic bombings of Hiroshima and Nagasaki.

After the war, Wendover was used for training exercises, gunnery range and as a research facility. It was closed by the Air Force in 1969, and the base was given to Wendover City in 1977. Tooele County, Utah, assumed ownership of the airport and base buildings in 1998, and the county continues to operate the airfield as a public airport. A portion of the original bombing range is now the Utah Test and Training Range (UTTR) which is used extensively by the Air Force with live fire targets on the range.

== Origins ==
Wendover Air Force Base's history began in 1940, when the United States Army began looking for additional bombing ranges. The area near the town of Wendover was well-suited to these needs; the land was virtually uninhabited, had generally excellent flying weather, and the nearest large city (Salt Lake City) was 100 miles (160 km) away (Wendover had around 100 citizens at the time). Though isolated, the area was served by the Western Pacific Railroad, and many of its citizens were employed by the railroad.

Construction of the base began on 20 September 1940 and on the range on 4 November 1940. Wendover Air Base became a subpost of Fort Douglas in Salt Lake City on 29 July 1941. By that time a total of 1,822,000 acres (737,000 ha) had been acquired for the base and associated gunnery/bombing range 86 miles (138 km) long and 18 to 36 miles (29 to 58 km) wide. Ranchers protested the loss of their grazing land, which they claimed would wipe them out and cost the state of Utah $1.5 million annually. They took their complaints to Governor Henry Hooper Blood, but the War Department pressed on with the development of the bombing range. The first military contingent arrived on 12 August 1941, to construct targets on the bombing range. To provide water, a pipeline was run from a spring on Pilot Peak to the base.

== World War II ==
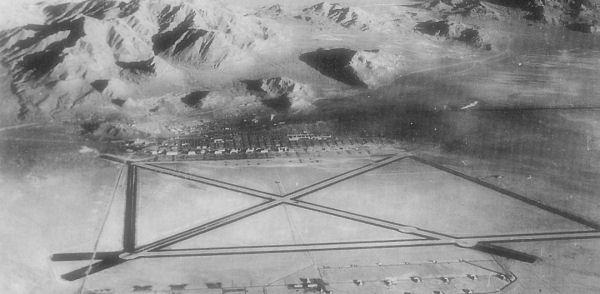
Aerial photo of Wendover AAF looking north, 1943

With the entrance of the United States into World War II, Wendover Field took on greater importance. It was the Army Air Force's largest bombing and gunnery range. In March 1942 the Army Air Force activated Wendover Army Air Field and also assigned the research and development of guided missiles, pilotless aircraft, and remotely controlled bombs to the site. The new base was supplied and serviced by the Ogden Air Depot at Hill Field. In April 1942, the Wendover Sub-Depot was activated and assumed technical and administrative control of the field, under the Ogden Air Depot. The Wendover Sub-Depot was tasked to requisition, store, and issue all Army Air Forces property for organizations stationed at Wendover Field for training.

By late 1943 there were some 2,000 civilian employees and 17,500 military personnel at Wendover. Construction at the base continued for most of the war, including three 8,100-foot (2,500 m) paved runways, taxiways, a 300,000-square-foot (28,000 m^{2}) ramp, and seven hangars. By May 1945 the base consisted of 668 buildings, including a 300-bed hospital, gymnasium, swimming pool, library, chapel, cafeteria, bowling alley, two movie theatres, and 361 housing units for married officers and civilians.

=== Heavy Bombardment Group training ===
Wendover's mission was to train heavy bomb groups. The training of Boeing B-17 Flying Fortress and Consolidated B-24 Liberator groups began in April 1942, with the arrival of the 306th Bomb Group flying B-17s. From March 1942 through April 1944, Wendover AAF hosted twenty newly formed B-17 and B-24 groups during one phase of their group training. The Second Air Force organized bombardment training into three phases. In the first, training focused on the individual crew members. In the second, training involved the whole crew, who would conduct training together. The third and final phase saw the group's crews training together, with formation flying and practice combat missions. Until the end of 1943, each phase of training was conducted at a different base.

Heavy Bomb Groups Trained at Wendover Army Air Base
Group	Type	Destination	Training dates	Reference
306th Bomb Group	B-17	Eighth Air Force	April–August 1942	
302d Bomb Group	B-24	Operational Conversion Unit	July–September 1942	
308th Bomb Group	B-24	Fourteenth Air Force	October–November 1942	
100th Bomb Group	B-17	Eighth Air Force	November 1942 – January 1943	
379th Bomb Group	B-17	Eighth Air Force	December 1942 – February 1943	
384th Bomb Group	B-17	Eighth Air Force	January–April 1943	
388th Bomb Group	B-17	Eighth Air Force	February–May 1943	
393d Bomb Group	B-17	Operational Conversion Unit	April–June 1943	
399th Bomb Group	B-24	Operational Conversion Unit	April–December 1943	
445th Bomb Group	B-24	Eighth Air Force	June–July 1943	
448th Bomb Group	B-24	Eighth Air Force	July–September 1943	
451st Bomb Group	B-24	Fifteenth Air Force	July–September 1943	
458th Bomb Group	B-24	Eighth Air Force	July 1943 – September 1943	
461st Bomb Group	B-24	Fifteenth Air Force	July 1943	
464th Bomb Group	B-24	Fifteenth Air Force	August 1943	
467th Bomb Group	B-24	Eighth Air Force	August–September 1943	
489th Bomb Group	B-24	Eighth Air Force	October 1943 – April 1944	
490th Bomb Group	B-24	Eighth Air Force	October 1943	
494th Bomb Group	B-24	Seventh Air Force	December 1943 – April 1944	
457th Bomb Group	B-17	Eighth Air Force	December 1943 – January 1944	

=== Fighter training ===
In April 1944, the role of Wendover Army Air Base changed with the arrival from Louisiana of P-47 fighters of the 72nd Fighter Wing. The program ended in September after three groups, totalling 180 men, had been trained.

=== 509th Composite Group ===
In June 1943, preparations began for the operational use of atomic bombs. Although not as suitable for the atomic mission as the British Avro Lancaster with its cavernous 33-foot (10 m) bomb bay, Major General Leslie R. Groves, Jr., the director of the Manhattan Project, and General Henry H. Arnold, the Chief of United States Army Air Forces (USAAF), wanted to use an American plane, if this was at all possible, so the Boeing B-29 Superfortress was chosen, even though it required substantial modification. The modification project was codenamed Silverplate, but this codename eventually came to identify the training and operational aspects of the program as well.

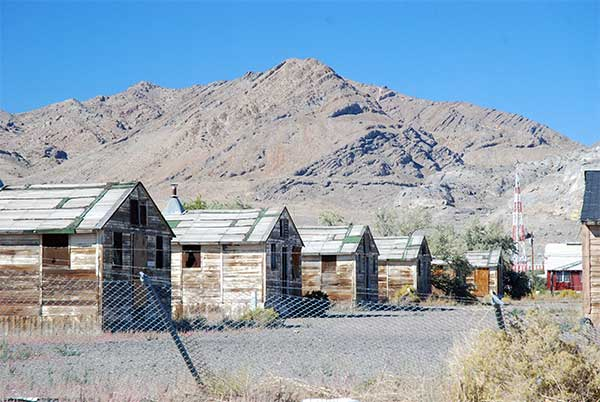
Abandoned World War II housing units at Wendover Army Air Field

Arnold selected Lieutenant Colonel Paul Tibbets, an officer with a distinguished combat record in Europe and North Africa, who had expert knowledge of the B-29 as one of its test pilots, to form and train a group to deliver atomic bombs. Tibbets chose the Wendover over Great Bend, Kansas, and Mountain Home, Idaho, as the location for his training program. It was remote, which was good for secrecy and security, but within reasonable distance by air from the Manhattan Project's Site Y, at Los Alamos, New Mexico, and the Naval Auxiliary Air Station Salton Sea, where bombing tables for the mission would be prepared. The base was given the code name "Kingman", and became the Manhattan Project's Site K. The activity to assemble, modify and flight test prototype bombs was named "Project W-47".

On 14 September 1944, the 393d Bomb Squadron arrived at Wendover from its former base at Fairmont Army Air Base, Nebraska, where it had been an operational training unit (OTU) with the 504th Bombardment Group since 12 March. When its parent group deployed to the Marianas in early November 1944, the squadron was assigned directly to the Second Air Force until creation of the 509th Composite Group on 17 December 1944. As part of the formation of the 509th, about 800 people stationed at the field, were transferred to the new group. To make the 509th Composite Group as self-contained as possible, other units were assigned, including the 390th Air Service Group, with the 603d Air Engineering and 1027th Materiel Squadrons; the 320th Troop Carrier Squadron, known as the "Green Hornet Airlines"; the 1395th Military Police Company, and later the 1st Ordnance Squadron. A Manhattan Project unit, the 1st Technical Detachment, was attached to the group.

The 216th Army Air Forces Base Unit (Special) constructed prototype atomic weapons (without nuclear material) and drop tested them. Little was known about the flight characteristics of the prototype atom bomb designs and how the fusing mechanism would work. In February 1945, a Flight Test Section was created within the 216th Army Air Forces Base Unit to carry out testing with prototype bombs in the shape of the Little Boy and Fat Man bombs. It was originally equipped with five Silverplate B-29s, three flight crews and five maintenance crews. To help out with an increasingly demanding schedule, four crews from the 393d Bombardment Squadron were made available. The Flight Test Section carried out 24 drop tests in June and 30 in July. About two-thirds of the June tests were with Fat Man shapes and the rest with Little Boy ones. In July, all but four of the tests were with Fat Man shapes, some with explosive-filled Pumpkin bombs. Test drops were carried out at Wendover, at the Naval Ordnance Test Station at Inyokern, and at the Naval Auxiliary Air Station Salton Sea. Testing continued up to the last minute, with the Fat Man firing unit, known as the X-unit, only being successfully tested at Wendover on 4 August, and a final test of the X-unit was carried out six days later.

The aircrews trained continuously until May. Each bombardier completed at least 50 practice drops of inert pumpkin bombs before Tibbets declared his group combat-ready. The ground support echelon of the 509th Composite Group received movement orders and moved by rail on 26 April 1945 to its port of embarkation at Seattle, Washington. On 6 May the support elements sailed on the SS Cape Victory for the Marianas, while group materiel was shipped on the SS Emile Berliner. An advance party of the air echelon flew by C-54 to North Field, Tinian, between 15 and 22 May. It was joined by the ground echelon on 29 May 1945, marking the group's official change of station. It was from Tinian that it carried out the atomic bombings of Hiroshima and Nagasaki.

The 216th Army Air Forces Base Unit moved to Oxnard Field in September 1945, where it was transferred to the Manhattan District's 9812th Technical Services Unit on 17 December 1945. Oxnard was later designated Sandia Base. The Special Ordnance Detachment took with it its special tools and equipment, and even some of its buildings. The test program resumed at Sandia in January 1946.

=== JB-2 Testing ===
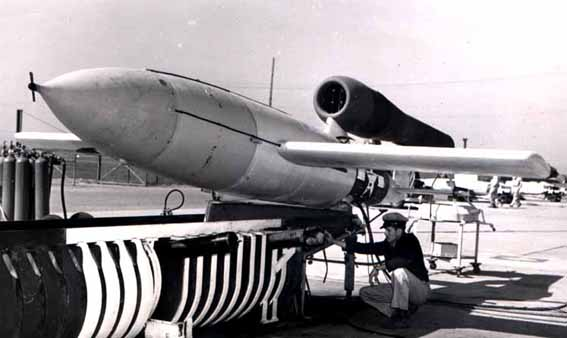
JB-2 being inspected by USAAF personnel at Wendover AAF, 1944

In early September 1944, a detachment of the Special Weapons Branch, Wright Field, Ohio, arrived at Wendover with thirteen Republic-Ford JB-2 flying bombs. The JB-2 was a United States copy of the Nazi V-1 flying bomb, which was reverse-engineered from malfunctioning wrecks of V-1s recovered in England. The United States JB-2 was different from the German V-1 in only the smallest of dimensions. At Wendover, a launch ramp was constructed for the JB-2, engineered from plans developed from aerial photographs of ramps used by the Germans in the Low Countries. In addition to the ground launch ramp, a B-17 Flying Fortress was modified to be able to carry the jet bomb underneath a wing and air launch it. Numerous tests were conducted and an initial production order was 1,000 units was made by the Army, with subsequent planned production of 1,000 per month. The fortunes of war in Europe in the spring of 1945 led to the decision to use the JB-2 in the Pacific Theater, to be used as part of Operation Downfall, the planned invasion of Japan. The sudden end of the war in September 1945 led to the curtailment of the JB-2 program and the weapon was never used in combat.

== Postwar use ==
The training of B-29 aircrews and the testing of prototype atom bombs was the last major contribution of Wendover Field during World War II. After war's end, some crew training continued, but at a reduced level. For a while, B-29s which had returned from the Marianas were flown to Wendover for storage. In the summer of 1946, the Ogden Air Technical Service Command at Hill Army Air Field north of Salt Lake City assumed jurisdiction over all operations at Wendover Field except engineering and technical projects.

A fast-moving fire on the night of 6 July 1946 destroyed a hangar and seven buildings, described as "mobile-type, wooden structures", as well as six training planes, before it was brought under control. Damage was estimated at US$1.5 million by Colonel Ray Harris, commanding officer, Ogden Air Technical Command.

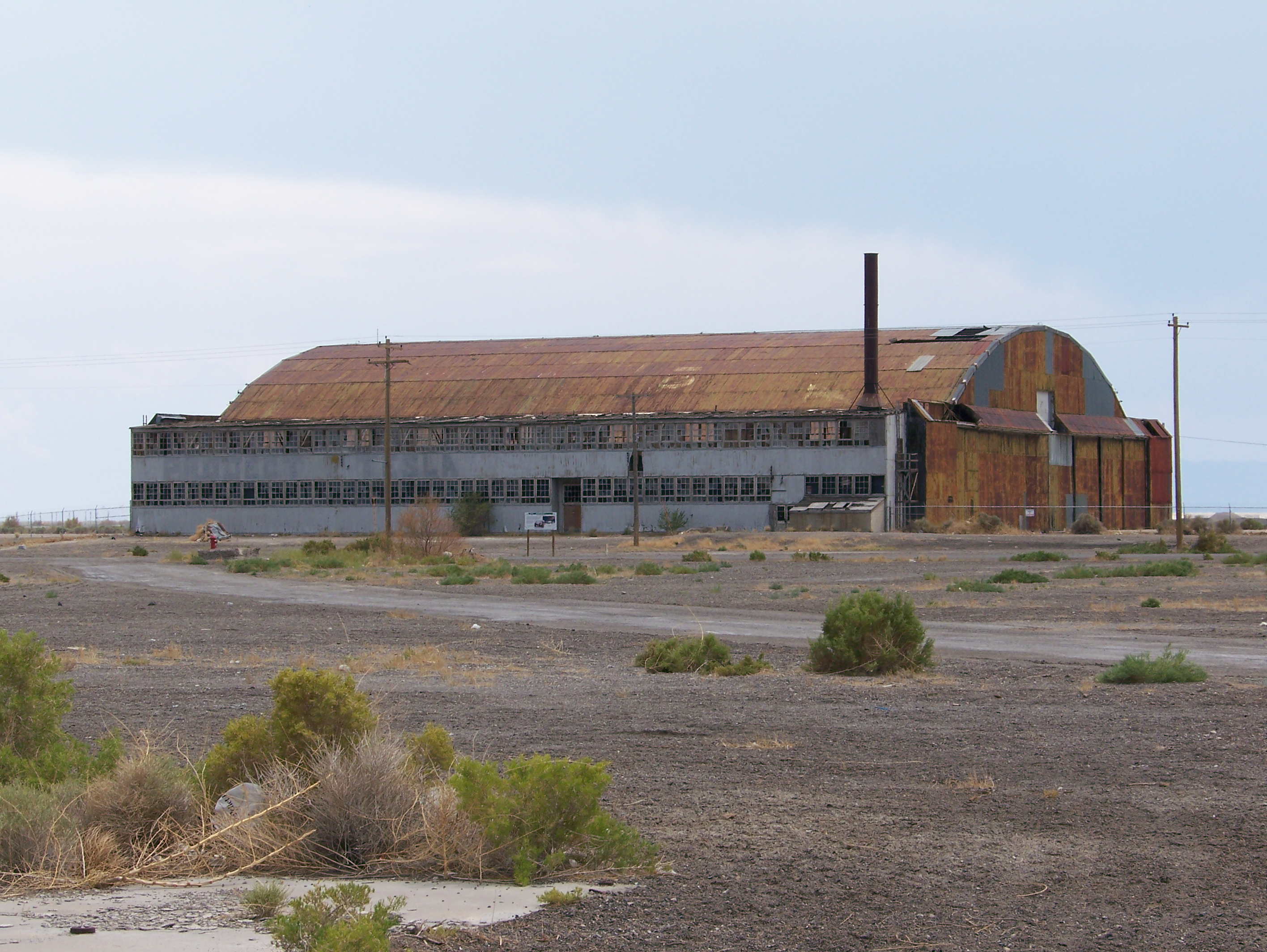
Enola Gay hangar

Wendover played a key role in the postwar weapons development industry with three areas being developed. The first was further testing of the JB-2 Loon flying bomb. In the case of the second area, the B-17 Flying Fortress, obsolete as a combat aircraft, was being tested to fly remotely. Gliding bombs, based on captured technology from the wartime Henschel Hs 293 German radio-controlled glide bomb were being developed that could be controlled by radar or radio. The third consisted of bombs that could be controlled by the launching plane. The historic GAPA (ground to air pilotless aircraft) Boeing project resulted in the first supersonic flight of an American Air Force vehicle on 6 August 1946. In March 1947, the Air Proving Ground Command research programs were moved to Alamogordo Army Airfield, New Mexico. As a result, 1,200 personnel from Wendover Field were moved to New Mexico from Utah and were relocated to Alamogordo to conduct guided missile research projects. Three ongoing projects were transferred: Ground-to-Air Pilotless Aircraft (GAPA), JB-2 Loon flight testing, and ASM-A-1 Tarzon gliding bomb.

Transferred to the Strategic Air Command' Fifteenth Air Force in March 1947. With the establishment of the U.S. Air Force as an independent service later that year, the installation was renamed Wendover Air Force Base in 1947, but while bombardment groups deploying on maneuvers used the bombing range, the rest of the base remained unused. It was inactivated in 1948 and declared surplus, although retained in a caretaker status. The Air Materiel Command assumed responsibility for the base in July 1950, placing it under the jurisdiction of the Ogden Air Material Area at Hill Air Force Base. Between 1950 and 1954, the base was staffed by a skeleton crew of thirteen. The buildings deteriorated. Some were removed, some demolished, and some burned down.

Tactical Air Command (TAC) reactivated the base under the Ninth Air Force on 1 October 1954, and tactical units deployed there for exercises, utilizing the base for the next four years. TAC invested several million dollars renovating the base facilities, and constructed new targets on the range. But only 331 personnel were assigned to the base in 1956. The base was deactivated again in December 1957. It transferred back to Ogden on 1 January 1958 and renamed Wendover Air Force Auxiliary Field, while the range was renamed Hill Air Force Range in 1960, and inactivated in August 1961.

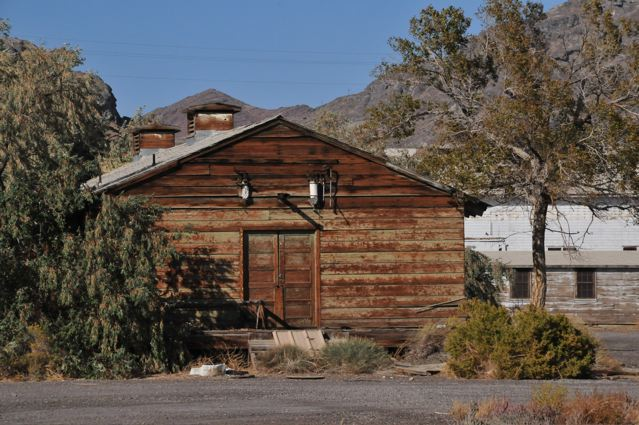
World War II barracks

The base was reactivated on 15 July 1961, but the only personnel based there were a fifteen-man firefighting detachment. By 1962, when the base was again deactivated, only 128 of the original 668 buildings remained. The General Services Administration (GSA) wanted to sell the base to the town of Wendover, leaving only the bombing ranges and radar site with the Air Force. It was declared surplus in 1972. In 1974, the base was renamed Decker Field, in acknowledgement of Mr. Douglas A. Decker's and his team's successful effort to open Wendover Air Force Base to public use. The base continued to be used occasionally for training by Air National Guard units, and the firefighting detachment remained until 1977.

Wendover was officially listed on the National Register of Historic Places on 1 July 1975. The entire facility was declared surplus in 1976, and on 9 July 1976, the water system and its annexes were transferred to the city of Wendover, Utah. The GSA deeded most of the base, including runways, taxiways, hangars, hospital complex, and several warehouses to Wendover for a civil airport on 15 August 1977. The Air Force retained about 86 acres (35 ha) of the cantonment area and 164 acres (66 ha) of the radar site.

Beginning in 1980 the 4440th Tactical Fighter Training Group began holding regular exercises known as Red Flag from Nellis AFB, Nevada. These exercises used Wendover, with over 9,000 men and women deployed to Decker Field, Utah. About 5,200 sorties were flown, representing over 9,500 flying hours. Red Flag exercises at Wendover were discontinued after 1986. The U.S. Air Force relinquished the remainder of Decker Field to the town of Wendover in 1992.

== Current uses ==
=== Wendover Airport ===
Wendover Airport
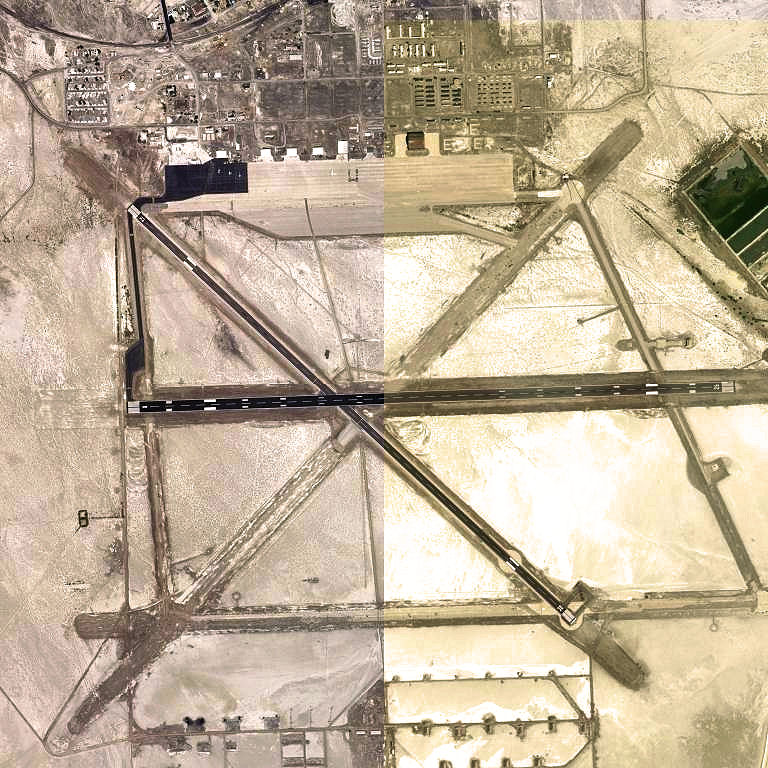
- USGS 2006 orthophoto
- IATA: ENV; ICAO: KENV; FAA LID: ENV

Summary
- Airport type: Public
- Owner: Tooele County (Utah)
- Serves: Wendover, Utah and West Wendover, Nevada
- Location: Wendover, Utah
- Elevation AMSL: 4,237 ft (1,291 m)
- Coordinates: 40°43′07″N 114°01′51″W

Map
- Location of airport in Utah / United States ENV (the United States)

Runways
Direction	Length		Surface
Direction	ft	m	Surface
8/26	10,002	3,049	Asphalt
12/30	8,002	2,439	Asphalt

Statistics (2023)
- Aircraft operations (year ending 3/31/2023): 4,586
- Based aircraft: 3
- Source: Federal Aviation Administration

Wendover Airport (IATA: ENV, ICAO: KENV, FAA LID: ENV) is a county-owned, public-use airport located one nautical mile (2 km) southeast of the central business district of Wendover, a city on the western edge of Tooele County, Utah, United States, near the border with Nevada.

The airfield is very isolated in northwest Utah, sitting in the middle of a vast wasteland miles away from any major population center. It is probably for this reason, and the dry hot climate, that much of the airfield remains today. Still-extant facilities include the vast runway system, numerous ramps, taxiways, dispersal pads, and most of the original hangars (including the Enola Gay B-29 hangar). Most of the hospital complex and many barracks remain, as does a chow hall, chapel, swimming pool and many other World War II-era buildings.

The airport is included in the National Plan of Integrated Airport Systems for 2011–2015, which categorized it as a primary commercial service airport. As per Federal Aviation Administration records, the airport had 46,264 passenger boardings (enplanements) in calendar year 2008, 50,360 enplanements in 2009, and 50,734 in 2010. In 2019, the last full year of charter service by Swift Air, ENV logged 52,748 passenger boardings before dropping to 10,824 in 2020, after which charter service ceased.

==== Facilities and aircraft ====
Wendover Airport covers an area of 1,960 acres (793 ha) at an elevation of 4,237 feet (1,291 m) above mean sea level. It has two runways with asphalt surfaces: 8/26 is 10,002 by 150 feet (3,049 x 46 m) and 12/30 is 8,002 by 100 feet (2,439 x 30 m).

For the 12-month period ending March 31, 2023, the airport had 4,586 aircraft operations, an average of 88 per week: 83% general aviation, and 18% military. At that time there were 3 aircraft based at this airport: 2 jet and 1 single-engine. The airport is an uncontrolled airport that has no control tower.

==== Civilian history ====
Wendover AAF was declared surplus in 1976 and on June 16 most of the field, including the water system, was turned over to Wendover, Utah, as a municipal airport. Beginning in 1980, the 4440th Tactical Fighter Training Group (Red Flag) at Nellis AFB, Nevada, used the field for exercises, but they were discontinued after 1986. In the late 1990s the airport's ownership was transferred from the city of Wendover to Tooele County.

Still-extant facilities include three paved runways, numerous ramps, taxiways, dispersal pads, all of the original hangars (including the "Enola Gay" B-29 hangar), and 75 other World War II–era buildings.

Several flying scenes for the 1997 movie Con Air were filmed at Wendover, using a Fairchild C-123K Provider. A non-profit group, Historic Wendover Airfield, is attempting to restore the historic elements of the field.

The airport received a $1.2 million grant from the Federal Aviation Administration to resurface its runways in September 2002. As a result of a federal grant and donations by local casinos the airport acquired a new fire truck in 2013.

As of February 2022, there are no scheduled airline service to Wendover. Swift Air offered charter flights to various cities across the United States and Canada from Wendover using Boeing 737-800 and Boeing 737-400 aircraft, as part of a package deal to bring tourists to local casinos. However, these charter flights were discontinued during the 2020 COVID pandemic and as of 2023 have not resumed, leaving the passenger terminal vacant.

=== Museum ===
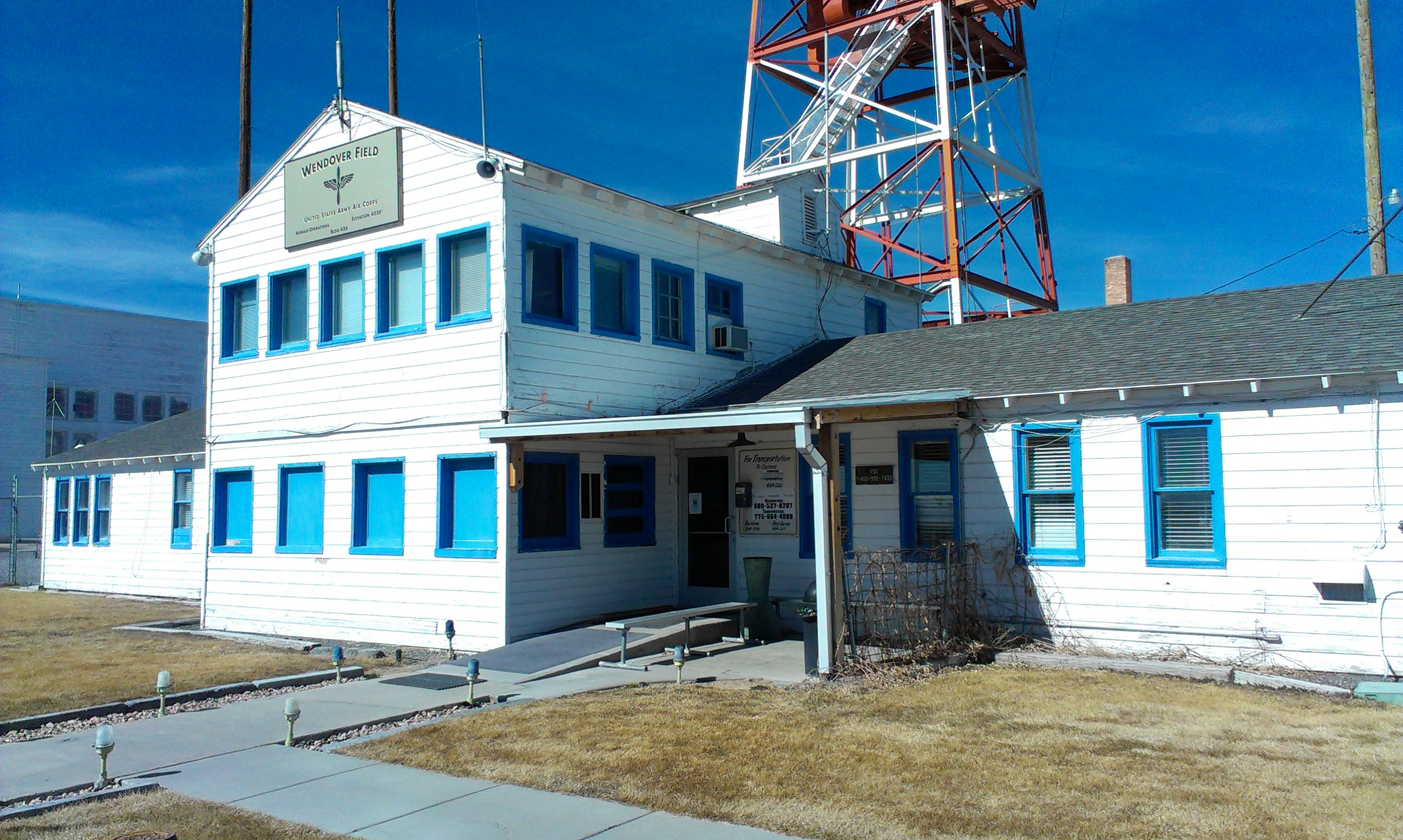
The operations building/museum/gift shop at the Historic Wendover Airfield. The tall structure behind the building is the old control tower from World War II.

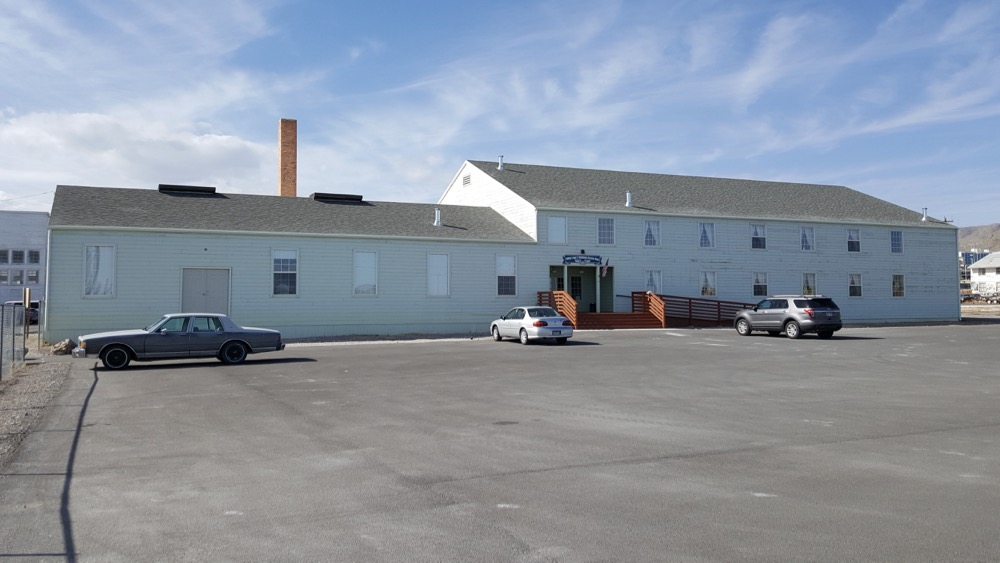
Wendover AFB Restored Officer's Service Club in 2016.

In 2009, a hangar at the base dubbed The Manhattan Project's Enola Gay Hangar was listed as one of the most endangered historic sites in the United States. A local group, Historic Wendover Airfield, is attempting to preserve the former base.

== Trivia ==
Numerous films, television shows and documentaries have been filmed using Wendover Field, including The Philadelphia Experiment (1984), Con Air (1997), Mulholland Falls (1996), Independence Day (1996), Hulk (2003) The Core (2003) and Fallout (American TV series) (2024)

== See also ==
- Utah World War II Army Airfields
- List of HABS documentation of Wendover Air Force Base

== Sources ==
- Craven, Wesley F.; Cate, James L., eds. (1955). The Army Air Forces in World War II (PDF). Vol. VI, Men and Planes. Chicago: University of Chicago Press. LCCN 48-3657. Archived from the original (PDF) on 23 November 2016.
- Campbell, Richard H. (2005). The Silverplate Bombers: A History and Registry of the Enola Gay and Other B-29s Configured to Carry Atomic Bombs. Jefferson, North Carolina: McFarland & Company. ISBN 0-7864-2139-8. OCLC 58554961.
- Groves, Leslie (1962). Now it Can be Told: The Story of the Manhattan Project. New York: Harper & Row. OCLC 537684.
- Jones, Vincent (1985). Manhattan: The Army and the Atomic Bomb (PDF). Washington, D.C.: United States Army Center of Military History. OCLC 10913875. Archived from the original (PDF) on 7 October 2014.
- Maurer, Maurer (1983) [1961]. Air Force Combat Units of World War II (PDF) (reprint ed.). Washington, DC: Office of Air Force History. ISBN 0-912799-02-1. Archived from the original (PDF) on 20 December 2016.
- Mindling, George; Bolton, Robert (2009). U.S. Air Force Tactical Missiles: 1949–1969: the Pioneers. Morrisville, North Carolina: Lulu.com. ISBN 9780557000296.
- Rowe, James Les (1972). Project W-47. Livermore, California: JA and RO Publishing. ISBN 0-9605562-0-6.
- Tibbets, Paul W. (1998). Return of the Enola Gay. New Hope, Pennsylvania: Enola Gay Remembered Inc. ISBN 0-9703666-0-4. OCLC 40566286.
- 509th Composite Group (1945). History of 509th Composite Group – 313th Bombardment Wing – Twentieth Air Force – Activation to 15 August 1945 (PDF). Tinian: 509th CG (AFHRA archived). Archived from the original (PDF) on 27 January 2012.
