= 216th Army Air Forces Base Unit =

216th Army Air Force Base Unit
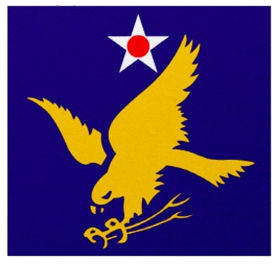
- Country: United States
- Branch: United States Air Force
- Garrison/HQ: Wendover Army Air Field, Utah
- Engagements: World War II

The 216th Army Air Forces Base Unit (AAF BU) (Special) provided base services at Wendover Army Airfield, where the 509th Composite Group was stationed during World War II. As such, it became involved in the Manhattan Project's program of testing bombs and aircraft under the codename Project W-47.

== History ==
By early 1944, the role of the United States Army Air Forces had moved away from defense and preparing new units. Some 90 per cent of the planned units had been activated, and three-quarters of them had already deployed overseas. The Air Forces therefore shifted to the training of replacement aircrew and special projects like the Boeing B-29 Superfortress program.

It was found that the existing system of units with fixed establishments was not sufficiently flexible for the Air Forces new roles, so in February 1944 Army Air Forces Headquarters ordered the units at each installation to be consolidated into Army Air Forces Base Units. The 216th Army Air Forces Base Unit was formed at Wendover Army Airfield in Utah, where it supported the 72d Fighter Wing, a formation responsible for training pilots of P-47 Thunderbolts. The base covered 1,822,000 acres (737,000 ha), and was the largest bombing and gunnery range in the world.

By September 1944, when Lieutenant Colonel Paul Tibbets visited Wendover for the first time, this training program was ending, and there was only one aircraft left. Tibbets had recently been selected to command the 509th Composite Group, although it had not yet been formed, and Wendover was one of three bases offered to him. Tibbets was particularly impressed by Wendover's remoteness. He noted that the runway was long enough to handle the B-29, and the hangars and maintenance facilities were good. The only drawback in his mind was that the base housing was inadequate. Tibbets selected Wendover without examining the other two sites.

Tibbets established his headquarters at Wendover on 8 September, and the 393d Bombardment Squadron followed three days later. The 509th Composite Group was not activated until 17 December. At this point, some 800 personnel were transferred to the new group from the 216th Army Air Forces Base Unit, including Karnes, who became the 509th Composite Group's adjutant. Wendover, codenamed "Kingman", became the Manhattan Project's Site K.

A new commander, Colonel Clifford J. Heflin, arrived in January 1945 to assume command of the 216th Army Air Forces Base Unit, and relieve Tibbets of some of his administrative burden. Like Tibbets, Heflin was a veteran pilot, having commanded the 801st Bombardment Group (Provisional) and the 492d Bombardment Group. As part of Operation Carpetbagger, this unit had air dropped agents, weapons and supplies to resistance fighters in German-occupied Europe.

The 216th Army Air Forces Base Unit's special activities in support of the Manhattan Project were codenamed Project W-47. These were carried out by two special elements within the unit.

=== Flight Test Section ===
In February 1945, Heflin created the Flight Test Section to carry out testing with prototype bombs in the shape of the Little Boy and Fat Man bombs. It was originally equipped with five Silverplate B-29s, three flight crews and five maintenance crews. The Flight Test Section was commanded Major Clyde "Stan" Shields, who had piloted the "Pullman" prototype Silverplate B-29 in the initial drop tests at Muroc Army Air Field in February and March 1944. The Flight Test Section received five new Silverplate B-29s in April 1945. It retired three of its aircraft, and kept another three, leaving it with eight test aircraft.

Test drop missions were initially flown by Shields and Heflin.To help out with an increasingly demanding schedule, four crews from the 393d Bombardment Squadron were made available. The Flight Test Section carried out 24 drop tests in June and 30 in July. About two-thirds of the June tests were with Fat Man shapes and the rest with Little Boy ones. In July, all but four of the tests were with Fat Man shapes, some with explosive-filled Pumpkin bombs. Test drops were carried out at Wendover, at the Naval Ordnance Test Station at Inyokern, and at Naval Auxiliary Air Station Salton Sea. Testing continued up to the last minute, with the Fat Man firing unit, known as the X-unit, only being successfully tested at Wendover on 4 August, and a final test of the X-unit was carried out six days later.

One of the three B-29s that carried Fat Man assemblies to Tinian was from the 216th Army Air Forces Base Unit's Flight Test Section.

=== Special Ordnance Detachment ===
To assemble bombs for the Flight Test Section, the 1st Ordnance Squadron, Special (Aviation) was activated on 6 March 1945 under the command of Captain Charles F. H. Begg. However, as part of the 509th Composite Group, it was scheduled to accompany the group to the Pacific Theater to assemble atomic and Pumpkin bombs for combat missions. The 216th Army Air Forces Base Unit began forming and training a Special Ordnance Detachment in January 1945 under the command of Captain Henry Roerkohl to take over the role of supporting the Flight Test Section. The two units worked together until the 1st Ordnance Squadron departed for Tinian in May 1945.

In all, the Special Ordnance Detachment assembled 71 bombs between May and August 1945. It moved to Oxnard Field in September, where it was transferred to the Manhattan District's 9812th Technical Services Unit on 17 December 1945. This was later designated Sandia Base. The Special Ordnance Detachment took with it its special tools and equipment, and even some of its buildings. The test program resumed at Sandia in January 1946. For its services, the Special Ordnance Detachment was awarded a Meritorious Service Unit Plaque on 19 December 1945.
