= Silverplate =

Code reference for the US Army Air Forces' role in the Manhattan Project

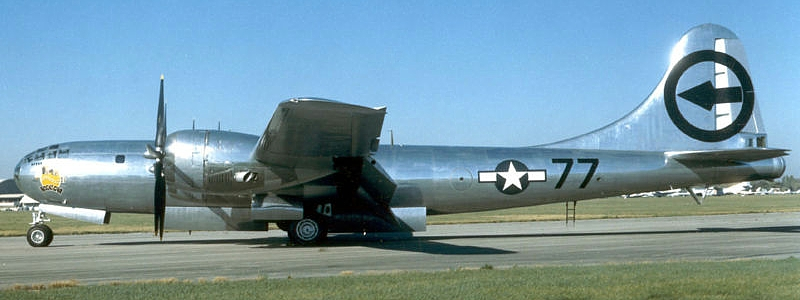
Bockscar, a Silverplate B-29 Superfortress of the 509th Composite Group, dropped an atomic bomb on Nagasaki

Silverplate was the code reference for the United States Army Air Forces' participation in the Manhattan Project during World War II. Originally the name for the aircraft modification project which enabled a B-29 Superfortress bomber to drop an atomic weapon, "Silverplate" eventually came to identify the training and operational aspects of the program as well. The original directive for the project had as its subject line "Silver Plated Project," but continued usage of the term shortened it to "Silverplate".

Testing began with scale models at the Naval Proving Ground in Dahlgren, Virginia, in August 1943. Modifications began in November 1943 on a prototype Silverplate B-29 known as the "Pullman", which was used for bomb-flight testing at Muroc Army Air Field in California beginning in March 1944. The testing led to further modifications of the bombs and the aircraft.

After the Pullman, Silverplate bombers were ordered in three batches:

- 17 ordered in August 1944 to allow the 509th Composite Group to train with the type of aircraft they would fly in combat and for the 216th Army Air Forces Base Unit to test bomb configurations.
- 28 ordered in February 1945 for operational use by the 509th Composite Group. This batch included the aircraft that would be used in the August 1945 atomic bombings of Hiroshima and Nagasaki.
- 19 ordered in July 1945, delivered between the end of the war and the end of 1947.

The use of the Silverplate codename was discontinued after the war, but modifications continued under a new codename: Saddletree. Another 80 aircraft were modified under this program. The last group of B-29s was modified in 1953 but never saw further service.

== Origin ==
The Silverplate project was begun in June 1943 when Norman Ramsey Jr. from the Los Alamos Laboratory's E-7 Group identified the Boeing B-29 Superfortress as the only U.S. airplane that could carry either type of the proposed weapons shapes: the tubular shape of the Thin Man, or the oval shape of the Fat Man.

Before the decision to use the B-29, serious consideration was given to using the British Avro Lancaster with its cavernous 33-foot (10 m) bomb bay to deliver the weapon. It would have required much less modification but would have necessitated additional training for the United States Army Air Forces (USAAF) crews. Major General Leslie R. Groves Jr., the director of the Manhattan Project, and General Henry H. Arnold, the chief of USAAF, wished to use an American plane if this was at all possible. The superior range and high-altitude performance of the B-29 made it a much better choice, and after the B-29 began to be modified in November 1943 for carrying the atomic bomb, the suggestion for using the Lancaster never came up again.

The first B-29 was delivered to the USAAF on 1 July 1943, and Groves met with Arnold later that month. Groves briefed Arnold on the Manhattan Project and asked for his help in testing the ballistics of the project's proposed bomb shapes. Arnold and the head of the Ordnance Division at Los Alamos, Captain William S. Parsons, arranged for tests to be carried out at the Naval Proving Ground in Dahlgren, Virginia, in August 1943. No aircraft was available that could carry the 17-foot (5.2 m) long Thin Man, so a 9-foot (2.7 m) scale model was used. The results were disappointing – the bomb fell in a flat spin – but the need for a thorough test program was demonstrated.

Groves met with Arnold again in September 1943. He informed Arnold that there was now a second bomb shape under consideration, the Fat Man, and he formally requested that further tests be carried out, that not more than three B-29s be modified to carry the weapons, and that the USAAF form and train a special unit to deliver the bombs. Arnold delegated responsibility for this to Major General Oliver P. Echols. In turn, Echols designated Colonel Roscoe C. Wilson as the project officer.

== Codename ==
Originally the name for the aircraft modification project for the B-29 to enable it to drop a nuclear weapon, Silverplate eventually came to identify the training and operational aspects of the program as well. The airplane modification project fell under the purview of the Manhattan Project's Project Alberta after March 1945. The original codename for the project was "Silver Plated," but continued usage of the term shortened it to the one word "Silverplate". For security reasons, the codename "Silverplate" was not officially registered. Confusion then resulted when the War Department allocated "Silverplate" to another project. Arnold's office had to order the other agency to discontinue its use of the codename.

Los Alamos' Thin Man and Fat Man code names were adopted by the USAAF for the weapons. A cover story was devised that Silverplate was about modifying a Pullman car for use by President Franklin Roosevelt (Thin Man) and United Kingdom Prime Minister Winston Churchill (Fat Man) on a secret tour of the United States.

== Initial experiments ==
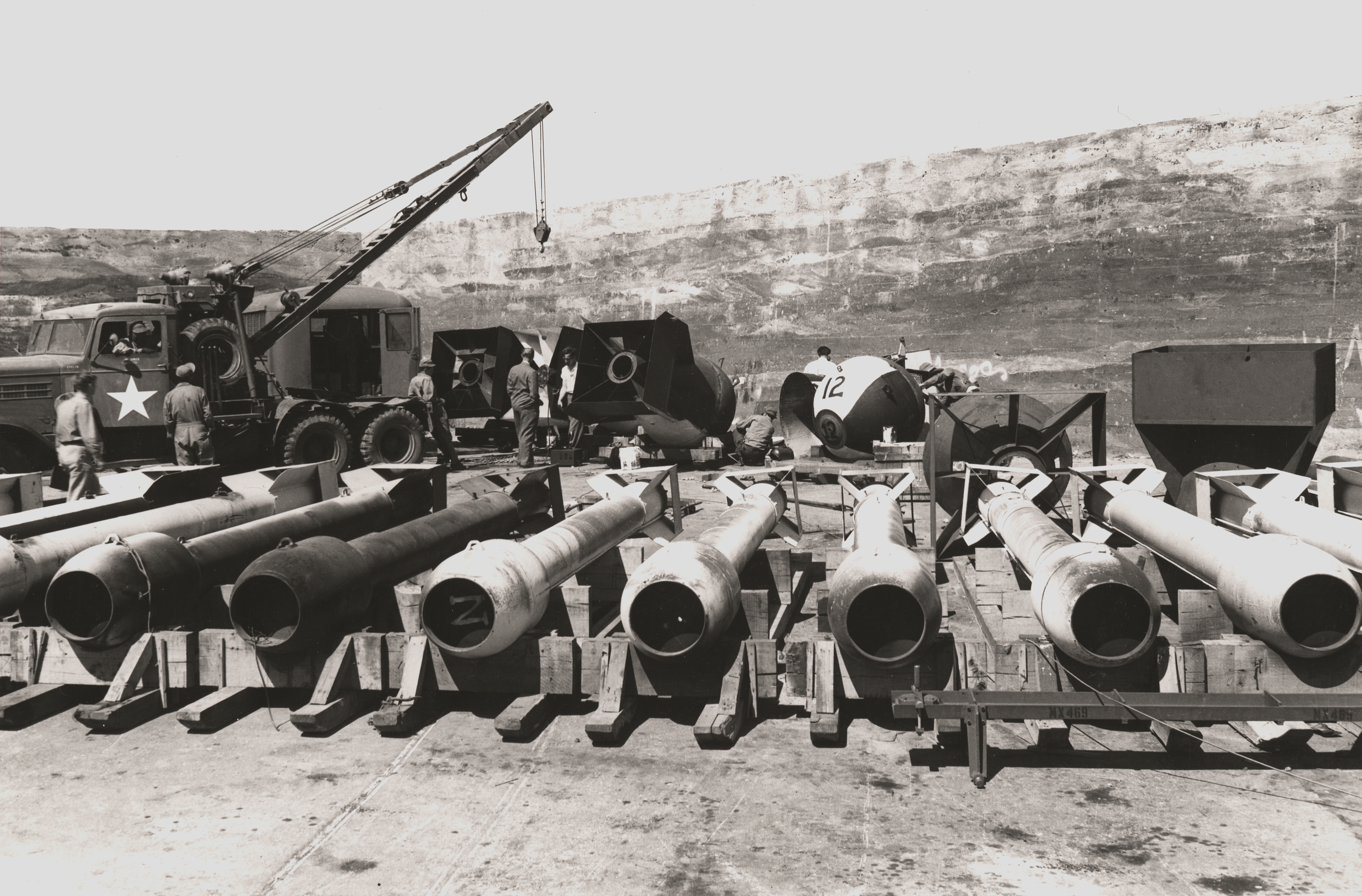
"Thin Man" plutonium gun test casings at Muroc Army Air Field. Casing designs for "Fat Man" bombs are seen in the background. The tow truck was used to lower bombs into a pit for loading into the aircraft.

The USAAF sent instructions to its Army Air Forces Materiel Command at Wright Field, Ohio, on 30 November 1943 for a highly classified B-29 modification project. The Manhattan Project would deliver full-sized mockups of the weapons shapes to Wright Field by mid-December, where Army Air Forces Materiel Command would modify an aircraft and deliver it for use in bomb flight testing at Muroc Army Air Field in California. B-29-5-BW 42-6259 (referred to as the "Pullman airplane" from an internal code name assigned it by the Engineering Division of Army Air Forces Materiel Command) was delivered to the 468th Bombardment Group at Smoky Hill Army Airfield in Kansas on 30 November 1943 and was flown to Wright Field on 2 December.

Modifications to the bomb bays of 42-6259 were extensive and time-consuming. Its four 12-foot (3.7 m) bomb bay doors and the fuselage section between the bays were removed and a single 33-foot (10 m) bomb bay configured. The length of the initial gun-type bomb shape was approximately 17 feet (5.2 m), necessitating that it be carried in the aft bomb bay, with some of its length protruding into the forward bay. The implosion-type bomb was mounted in the forward bay. New bomb suspensions and bracing were attached for both shape types, and separate twin-release mechanisms were mounted in each bay, using modified glider tow-cable attach-and-release mechanisms.

== Testing of bomb shapes ==
The Pullman B-29 flew into Muroc on 20 February 1944, and testing began on 28 February. Twenty-four drops were carried out before tests were discontinued so that improvements could be made to Thin Man. The bombs failed to release immediately, frustrating calibration tests. In what turned out to be the last test flight of the series on 16 March, a Thin Man was prematurely released while the B-29 was still en route to the test range and fell onto the bomb bay doors, severely damaging the aircraft. The modified glider mechanisms had apparently caused all four malfunctions, because of the weight of the bombs, and were replaced with British Type G single-point attachments and Type F releases used on the Lancaster B.I Special to carry the 12,000-pound (5,400 kg) Tallboy bomb.

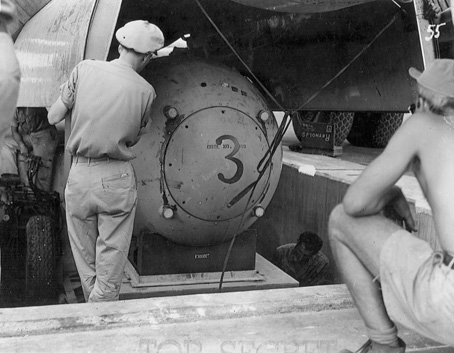
Fat Man test unit being raised from the pit into the bomb bay of a B-29 for bombing practice during the weeks before the attack on Nagasaki

After repair of the Pullman B-29 at Wright Field, testing resumed with three Thin Man and nine Fat Man shapes dropped in the last two weeks of June 1944. High-speed photographs revealed that the tail fins folded under pressure, resulting in an erratic descent. Various combinations of stabilizer boxes and fins were tested on the Fat Man shape to eliminate its persistent wobble until an arrangement dubbed a "California Parachute"—a cubical tail box with eight fins within the sheetmetal box "frame", 45° apart from each other (four "orthogonal" fins, and four more, one at each 45° angle to each corner)—was approved.

The Thin Man gun-type design was at that time based on the fissibility of the very pure plutonium-239 isotope so far only produced in microgram quantities by the cyclotron at University of California, Berkeley. When the Hanford Site production reactors came on-line in early 1944, the mix of plutonium-239 and plutonium-240 obtained was found to have a high rate of spontaneous fission. To avoid pre-detonation, the muzzle velocity of the gun-type design needed to be greatly raised, making it impractically long.

Thin Man as a plutonium-based design was therefore abandoned, and the weapon was re-designed to use uranium-235. The muzzle velocity required was much lower, reducing the barrel length of the resulting bomb, code-named Little Boy, to less than 10 feet (3.0 m). This allowed the device to fit into a standard B-29 bomb bay, so the Pullman was modified to its original configuration with the rear bomb bay of a standard B-29 design. All subsequent Silverplates were also configured in this manner. The Pullman B-29 was flown to Wendover Army Air Field in Utah in September 1944. It carried out further drop testing with the 216th Army Air Forces Base Unit until it was damaged in a landing accident in December.

== Wartime production versions ==
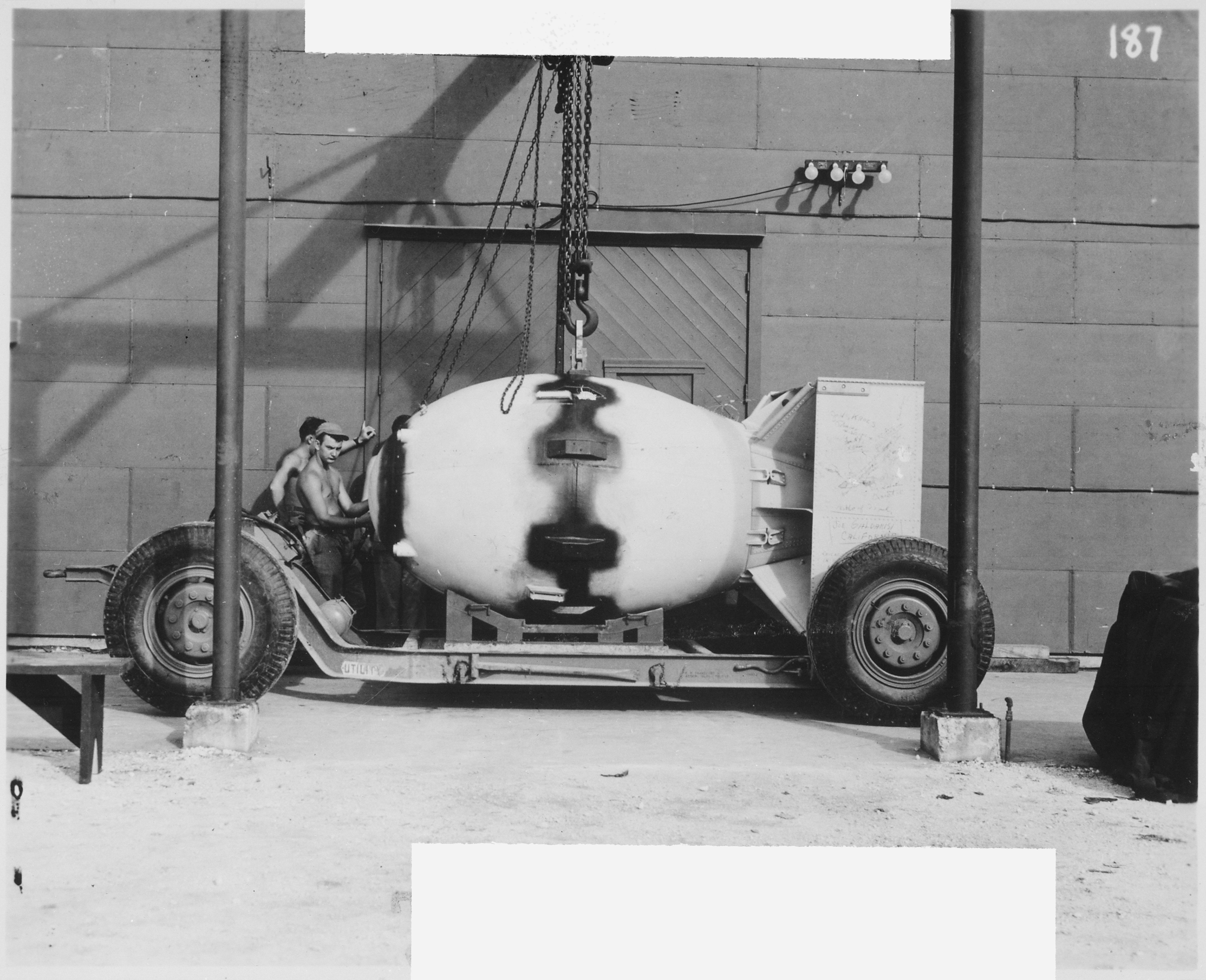
Fat Man unit being placed on the trailer cradle on Tinian

On 22 August 1944, to meet the requirements of the USAAF group about to be formed to train in the atomic mission, a production phase of Silverplate B-29s was ordered from the Glenn L. Martin Company's modification center at Offutt Field, south of Omaha, Nebraska, under the designation Project 98146-S. The first three of these second increment Silverplate B-29s were delivered to the USAAF in mid-October and flown to Wendover. They were fitted with British single-point bomb releases mounted on a re-designed H-frame suspension rack fitted in the forward bomb bay, so that additional fuel tanks could be carried in the aft bay. A new crew position, called the "weaponeer station", was created in the cockpit with a panel to monitor the release and detonation of the bomb during the actual combat drops. Fourteen production aircraft were assigned to the 393d Bombardment Squadron for training, and three to the 216th Army Air Force Base Unit for bomb drop testing.

By February 1945 the 17 aircraft of the second increment were in need of upgrades, particularly those of the 216th Army Air Force Base Unit. Four of the planes assigned to the 393d Bombardment Squadron (now part of the 509th Composite Group) were transferred to the 216th to meet an increase in its testing tempo. Rather than attempt to modify the existing aircraft a few at a time, a decision was made to start a new production series. The first five of this third increment, known as Project 98228-S, also went to the test unit. The order totaled an additional 28 aircraft, with delivery of 15 designated combat models for the 393d beginning in April. The final eight were not delivered until after the two atomic bomb missions in August. Two were given to the 216th while the remaining six were assigned to the 509th at Wendover as replacements for any bombers lost while operating from Tinian Naval Base. Ironically, no bombers were lost during operations from Tinian, but five of these six were lost in crashes over the next few years.

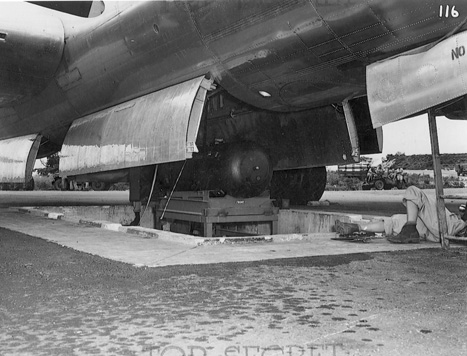
Little Boy being raised for loading into the Enola Gay's bomb bay

The final wartime Silverplates incorporated all technical improvements to B-29 aircraft, as well as the final series of Silverplate modifications that included Curtiss Electric reversible-pitch propellers and pneumatic actuators for rapid opening and closing of bomb bay doors. The British F-type bomb release and G-type attachment were installed, along with dual electrical and mechanical bomb release mechanisms. Early model B-29s were plagued by a host of engine problems, and the early Silverplate bombers were no exception. One was written off after being badly damaged as a result of an engine fire in February 1945. The fuel-injected Wright R-3350-41 engines in the later model bombers delivered in July and August 1945 were greatly improved and far more reliable. This was an important factor in the success of the 509th Composite Group's operations.

The Fat Man and Pumpkin bombs (high-explosive filled bombs that resembled and handled like a Fat Man) weighed over 10,000 pounds (4,500 kg), so weight was a concern, even with the more powerful engines. Weight reduction was accomplished by removal of all gun turrets and armor plating. This work was done by the 509th Composite Group for the early Silverplate aircraft, but later models were delivered without them. These B-29s represented a significant increase in performance over the standard variants.

Flying at 30,000 feet (9,100 m) put the B-29s above the effective range of Japanese flak. Each Pumpkin bomb mission was conducted by a formation of three aircraft in the hope of convincing the Japanese military that small groups of B-29s did not justify a strong response. This strategy proved successful, and Japanese fighters only occasionally attempted to intercept the 509th Composite Group's aircraft. One B-29 incurred minor battle damage in operations.

== Silverplate operational units ==
Including the Pullman B-29, a total of 46 Silverplate B-29s were produced during World War II. Of these, 29 were assigned to the 509th Composite Group during World War II, with 15 used to carry out the atomic bombings of Hiroshima and Nagasaki. An additional 19 Silverplate B-29s were ordered in July 1945, which were delivered between the end of the war, and the end of 1947. By this time only 13 of the original 46 were still operational. Thus, a total of 65 Silverplate B-29s were made, of which 32 were operational at the start of 1948. Martin-Omaha produced 57 Silverplate B-29s. The other eight were built by Boeing-Wichita. Of these 65 bombers, 31 were eventually converted to other configurations, 16 were placed in storage and later scrapped, and 12 were lost in accidents (including four of the Tinian bombers). The pair of historic weapons delivery aircraft, named Enola Gay and Bockscar, are currently displayed in museums.

The only other United States Air Force combat unit to use the Silverplate B-29 was the 97th Bombardment Wing at Biggs Air Force Base in El Paso, Texas. In mid-1949 it received 27 of the aircraft from the 509th Bombardment Wing when the latter transitioned to the B-50D bomber, an upgraded revision of the B-29. The re-equipment of the 97th Bombardment Wing was part of an expansion of the atomic strike force to ten wings during 1949. Within a year all were converted to TB-29 trainers. One other Silverplate B-29, on temporary assignment in the United Kingdom, was converted into a weather reconnaissance aircraft (WB-29) and transferred to the 9th Bombardment Wing at Travis Air Force Base in California. The last Silverplate B-29 in service as a nuclear weapons carrier was reassigned to another role in November 1951, ending Silverplate after nearly eight years.

== Saddletree ==
Use of the codename Silverplate was discontinued on 12 May 1947 because the codename had become compromised. It was superseded by a new codename, "Saddletree", which was applied to aircraft modifications only. Initially it was intended that Saddletree would refer only to modifications to the B-29s, but it came to be used for modifications to B-50 and B-36 bombers as well. Saddletree modifications included a new bomb bay frame and hoist and replaced the British FG bomb release with the newly developed U-1 pneumatic bomb release mechanism. Due to delays in the delivery of the B-50s, Saddletree commenced in February 1948. In all, 6,000 hours of work was carried out on each of the 36 B-50s by Sacramento Air Materiel Area.

The Joint Chiefs of Staff issued a directive in January 1948 for the modification of 225 B-29, B-50, and B-36 bombers to carry nuclear weapons, along with eight C-97 Stratofreighter aircraft to carry bomb assembly teams. There were already 32 Silverplate B-29s in service with the Strategic Air Command, so the Air Materiel Command was directed to carry out Saddletree modifications on a further 80 B-29s, 36 B-50As, 23 B-50Bs and 18 B-36Bs. The B-36A could not carry nuclear weapons without major modifications.

As the anticipated enemy was the Soviet Union, the aircraft also required "winterization" to allow them to operate from Arctic bases. On 16 April 1948, the codeword "Gem" was allocated to all modifications and improvements to provide atomic strike capability. The project included 36 B-29s, and the modification of 36 others to have an air refueling capability. With the addition of the 80 Saddletree B-29s, a total of 145 B-29s were modified to carry nuclear weapons, and 117 of these were assigned to operational units.

In October 1951, in anticipation of a major build-up of the USAF to 95 groups, and of delays in the B-47 program, the Air Materiel Command was ordered to modify an additional 180 B-29s then in storage to carry the Mark 4, Mark 5, Mark 6, and Mark 8 nuclear bombs. Modifications were carried out in Oklahoma City and Sacramento. By the time the aircraft were all delivered in September 1953, the B-29 was being phased out, and the modified aircraft went back into storage without seeing further service.

== Costs ==
In 1945, a B-29 bomber cost $782,000. It cost $32,000 to upgrade an aircraft to Silverplate configuration, so the total cost of a Silverplate bomber was $814,000. The total cost of the 65 wartime Silverplate B-29s was therefore $53 million. Adding $7 million for logistics, this put the estimated cost of the Silverplate project at around $60 million.
