= Thin Man (nuclear bomb) =

Nuclear weapon (development abandoned)

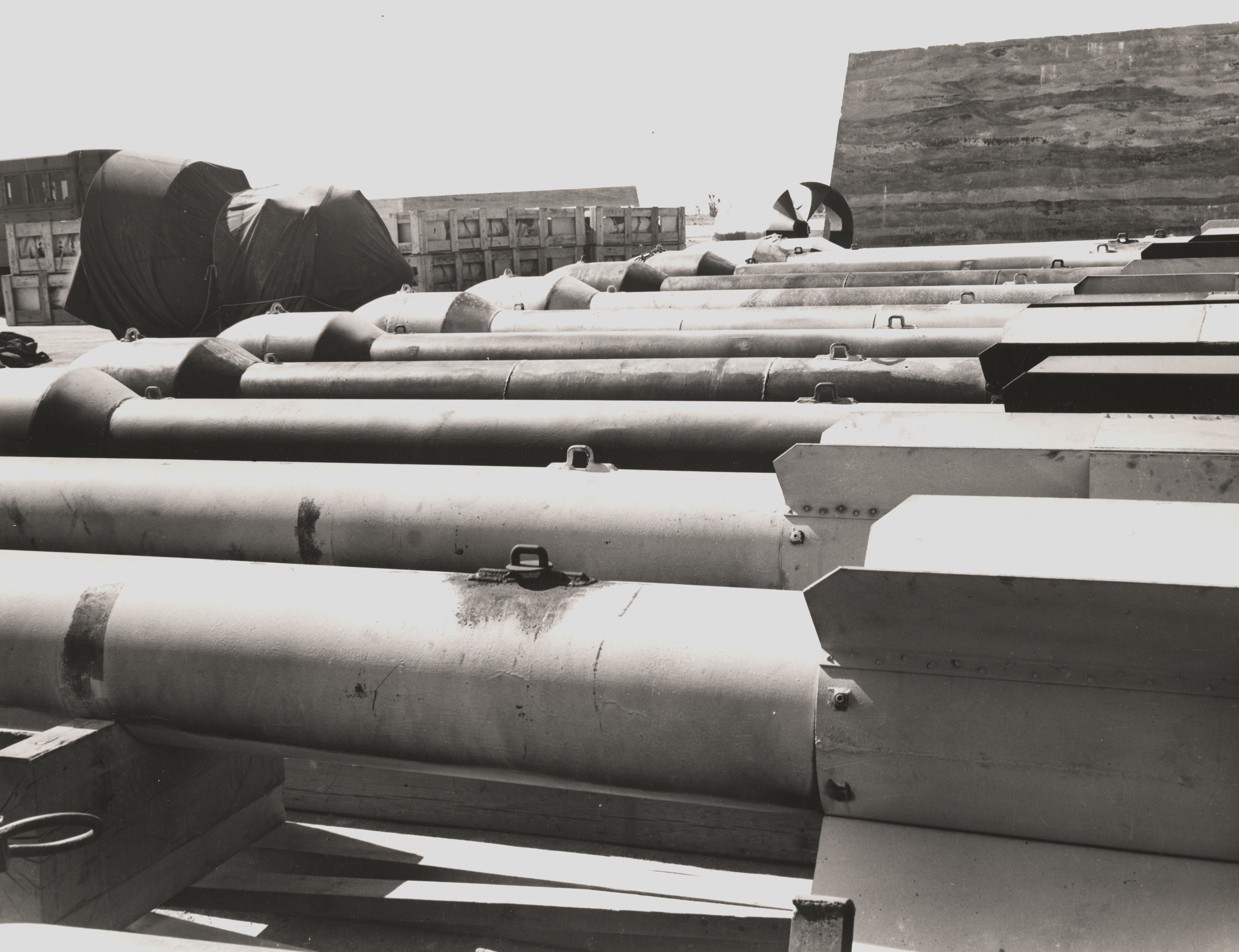
- "Thin Man" plutonium gun test casings
- Type: Nuclear weapon
- Place of origin: United States

Production history
- Designer: Los Alamos Laboratory

Specifications
- Length: 17 feet (5.2 m)
- Diameter: 38 inches (97 cm)
- Filling: Plutonium

"Thin Man" was the code name for a proposed plutonium-fueled gun-type nuclear bomb that the United States partially developed during the Manhattan Project. Its development was abandoned in 1944 after it was discovered that the spontaneous fission rate of nuclear reactor-bred plutonium was too high for use in a gun-type design due to the high concentration of the isotope plutonium-240.

== Early decisions ==
In 1942, prior to the United States Army taking over control of wartime atomic research in what became known as the Manhattan Project, Robert Oppenheimer held conferences in Chicago in June and Berkeley, California in July, at which physicists discussed nuclear bomb design issues. A gun-type design was chosen, in which two sub-critical masses of plutonium would be brought together by firing a "bullet" into a "target". The alternative idea of an implosion-type nuclear weapon was suggested by Richard Tolman, but it attracted scant consideration, being far more complex.

Oppenheimer reviewed his options in early 1943, and he gave priority to the gun-type weapon, but as a hedge against the threat of predetonation, he created the E-5 Group at the Los Alamos Laboratory under Seth Neddermeyer to investigate implosion. Implosion-type bombs were determined to be significantly more efficient in terms of explosive yield per unit mass of fissile material in the bomb, because compressed fissile materials react more rapidly and therefore more completely. But it was decided that the plutonium gun-type bomb would receive the bulk of the research effort, since it was the project with the least amount of uncertainty involved. It was assumed that the uranium gun-type bomb could be more easily adapted from it.

== Naming ==
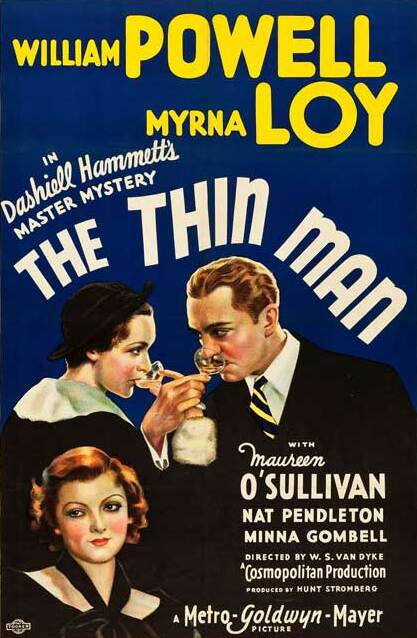
Robert Serber claims that the original gun-type design, Thin Man, was named after the series of noir films based on the work of Dashiell Hammett that were popular in the 1930s and 1940s.

The gun-type and implosion-type designs were code-named "Thin Man" and "Fat Man" respectively. These code names were created by Robert Serber, a former student of Oppenheimer's, who worked on the Manhattan Project. He chose them based on their design shapes; the Thin Man would be a very long device, and the name came from the Dashiell Hammett detective novel The Thin Man and series of movies by the same name. The Fat Man would be round and fat and was named after Sydney Greenstreet's character in The Maltese Falcon. The Little Boy uranium gun-type design came later and was named only to contrast with the Thin Man. Los Alamos's Thin Man and Fat Man code names were adopted by the United States Army Air Forces (USAAF). A cover story was devised that Silverplate was about modifying a Pullman car for use by President Franklin Roosevelt (Thin Man) and United Kingdom Prime Minister Winston Churchill (Fat Man) on a secret tour of the United States. Air Forces personnel used the code names over the phone to make it sound as though they were modifying a plane for Roosevelt and Churchill.

== Development ==
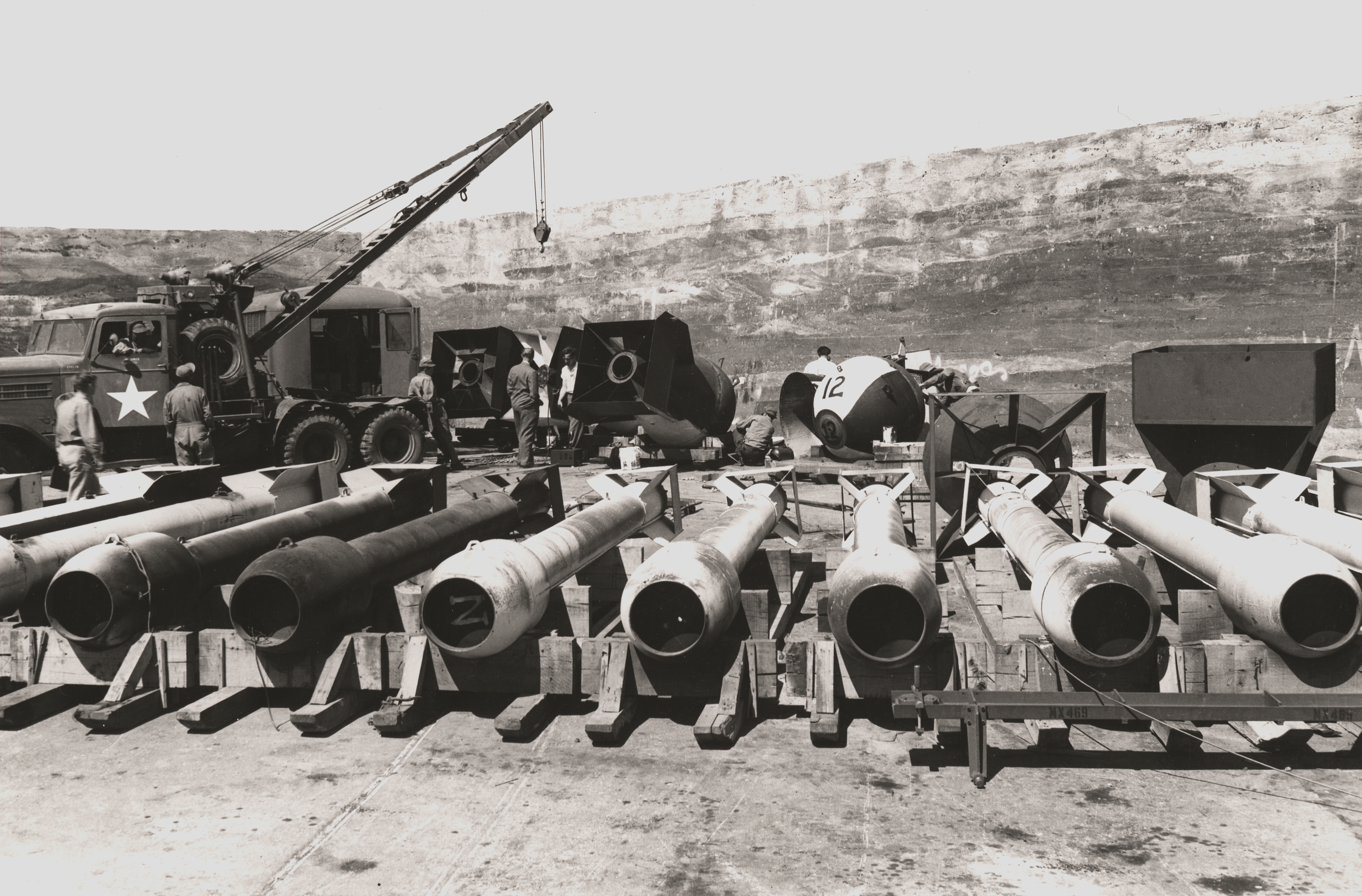
"Thin Man" plutonium gun test casings at Muroc Army Airfield, as part of Project Alberta in the Manhattan Project. "Fat Man" casings can be seen behind them.

To work on the plutonium gun design, Oppenheimer assembled a team at the Los Alamos Laboratory that included senior engineer Edwin McMillan and senior physicists Charles Critchfield and Joseph Hirschfelder. Critchfield had been working with sabots, which Oppenheimer believed would be required by the Thin Man to achieve the high muzzle velocities that critical assembly would require; Hirschfelder had been working on internal ballistics. Oppenheimer led the design effort himself until June 1943, when United States Navy Captain William Sterling Parsons arrived and took over the Ordnance and Engineering Division and direct management of the Thin Man project.

These four created and tested all the elements of the Thin Man design between April 1943 and August 1944. Parsons, who had developed the proximity fuze for the Navy, ran the division and handled liaison with other agencies. As the head of the E-6 Projectile, Target, and Source Group, Critchfield calculated critical masses, and instituted a system of live testing with scale models using 20 mm cannon and 3-inch guns. These were readily and easily obtained, while full-scale Thin Man tubes took months to produce. It was not possible to conduct tests with plutonium, as it was not yet available. Indeed, the actual physical characteristics of the metal were little more than educated guesses at this time.

Hirschfelder headed the E-8 Interior Ballistics Group. His group performed mathematical calculations, but he also had to identify a suitable powder, igniter, and primer. His group conducted full-scale tests with their selections. Fixing the physical size of the bomb proved important when it came to selecting a suitable aircraft to carry it. The E-8 group estimated the muzzle velocity of the gun at around 3,000 feet per second (910 m/s), close to the maximum achievable in 1944, and calculated that the pressure in the barrel would be up to 75,000 pounds per square inch (520,000 kPa).

Although the weapon's designers thought that simply bringing a critical mass together would be sufficient, Serber suggested that the design should also include an initiator. A polonium-210-beryllium initiator was chosen because polonium 210 has a 140-day half life, which allowed it to be stockpiled, and it could be obtained from naturally occurring ores from Port Hope, Ontario. Oppenheimer requested that it also be manufactured in the X-10 Graphite Reactor at the Clinton Engineer Works in Oak Ridge, Tennessee, or when they became available, the reactors at the Hanford Engineer Works in Washington State.

== Specifications ==
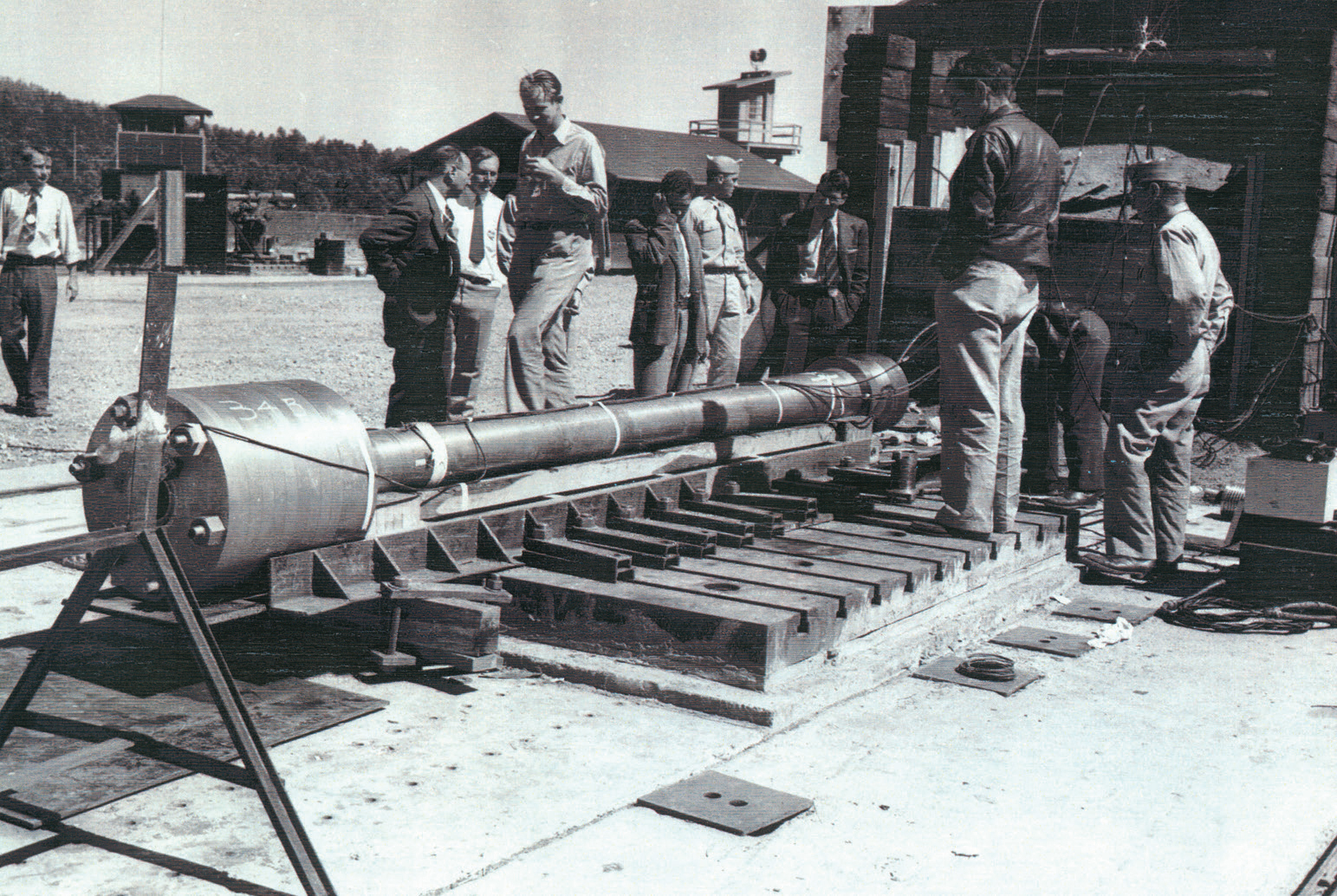
A prototype of the "Thin Man" gun being tested at Anchor Ranch, at Los Alamos

The "Thin Man" design was an early nuclear weapon design proposed before plutonium had been successfully bred in a nuclear reactor from the irradiation of uranium-238. It was assumed that plutonium, like uranium-235, could be assembled into a critical mass by a gun-type method, which involved shooting one sub-critical piece into another. To avoid predetonation or "fizzle", the plutonium "bullet" would need to be accelerated to a speed of at least 3,000 feet per second (910 m/s)—or else the fission reaction would begin before the assembly was complete, blowing the device apart prematurely.

Thin Man was 17 feet (5.2 m) long, with 38-inch (97 cm) wide tail and nose assemblies, and a 23-inch (58 cm) midsection. The length was necessary for the plutonium "bullet" to achieve adequate speed before reaching the "target". Weight was approximately 8,000 pounds (3,600 kg) for the final weapon model. There were no aircraft in the USAAF inventory that could carry a Thin Man without being modified, and in 1943, Norman Ramsey suggested the British Avro Lancaster as the only aircraft that could carry the Thin Man internally owing to its 33-foot-long (10 m) bomb bay. However, the American Boeing B-29 Superfortress could be modified to carry it by removing part of the bulkhead under the main wing spar and some oxygen tanks located between its two bomb bays. This modification was carried out on the 58th production example off the Boeing Wichita production line, AAF Serial No. 42-6259.

Although Ramsey had suggested the Lancaster, the chief of the USAAF, Lieutenant General Henry H. Arnold, rejected the suggestion, preferring an American type, specifically the B-29. Prior to dropping trials of the Thin Man and Fat Man dummy bombs, Brigadier General Leslie Groves, the director of the Manhattan Project, suggested the use of the Lancaster for trials since the B-29, although in production, was still scarce. Again, Arnold rejected the suggestion, as he had invested much time and money in the B-29's development.

== Design issues ==
=== Aerodynamics ===
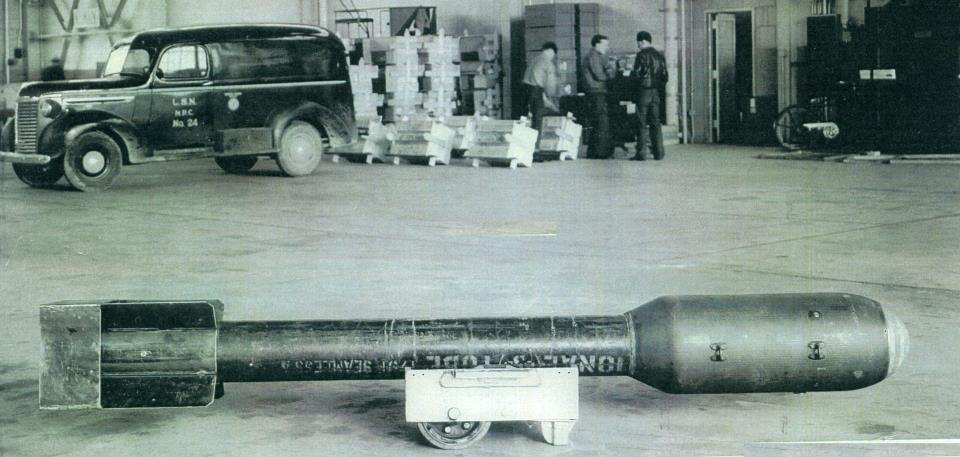
An early scale model created for testing the ballistics of the "Thin Man" gun-type atomic bomb. These early tests used 14/23 scale models made from a standard 500 lb gravity bomb, a 14" diameter pipe, and a box tail. The results were extremely poor.

The great length of the Thin Man bomb led to aerodynamic instabilities. Subscale models of the bomb were dropped from a Grumman TBF Avenger at the US Navy test range at Dahlgren, Virginia starting in August 1943. The bombs would spin sideways after being dropped and broke up when they hit the ground. Twenty-four drops were carried out in March 1944 before they were discontinued so that improvements could be made to Thin Man. The bombs failed to release immediately, frustrating calibration tests. In what turned out to be the last test flight of the series on 16 March 1944, a Thin Man was prematurely released while the B-29 was still en route to the test range and fell onto the bomb bay doors, severely damaging the test aircraft. The modified glider tow-hook mechanisms used to suspend the bomb in the bomb bay had caused all four malfunctions, due to the great weight of the bombs. They were replaced with British Type G single-point attachments and Type F releases as used on the Lancaster to carry the 12,000-pound (5,400 kg) Tallboy bomb.

=== Predetonation ===
The feasibility of a plutonium bomb had been questioned in 1942. James Conant heard on 14 November from Wallace Akers, the director of the British Tube Alloys project, that James Chadwick had "concluded that plutonium might not be a practical fissionable material for weapons because of impurities." Conant consulted Ernest Lawrence and Arthur Compton, who acknowledged that their scientists at Berkeley and Chicago respectively knew about the problem, but could offer no ready solution. Conant informed the director of the Manhattan Project, Brigadier General Leslie R. Groves Jr., who in turn assembled a special committee consisting of Lawrence, Compton, Oppenheimer, and McMillan to examine the issue. The committee concluded that any problems could be overcome by requiring higher purity.

In April 1944, experiments by Emilio G. Segrè and his P-5 Group at Los Alamos on the reactor-produced plutonium from X-10 Graphite Reactor showed that the plutonium contained impurities in the form of the isotope plutonium-240. This has a far higher spontaneous fission rate than plutonium-239. The cyclotron-produced material on which the original measurements had been made had much lower traces of plutonium-240. Its inclusion in reactor-bred plutonium appeared unavoidable. This meant that the spontaneous fission rate of the reactor plutonium was so high that it would be highly likely that it would predetonate and blow itself apart during the initial formation of a critical mass. The distance required to accelerate the plutonium to speeds where predetonation would be less likely would mandate a gun barrel too long for any existing or planned bomber. The only way to use plutonium in a workable bomb was implosion – a far more difficult engineering task.

The impracticability of a gun-type bomb using plutonium was agreed at a meeting held on 17 July 1944. All gun-type work in the Manhattan Project was directed at the Little Boy enriched uranium gun design, and almost all of the research at the Los Alamos Laboratory was re-oriented around the problems of implosion for the Fat Man bomb.
