= Fat Man =

U.S. atomic bomb type used at Nagasaki, 1945

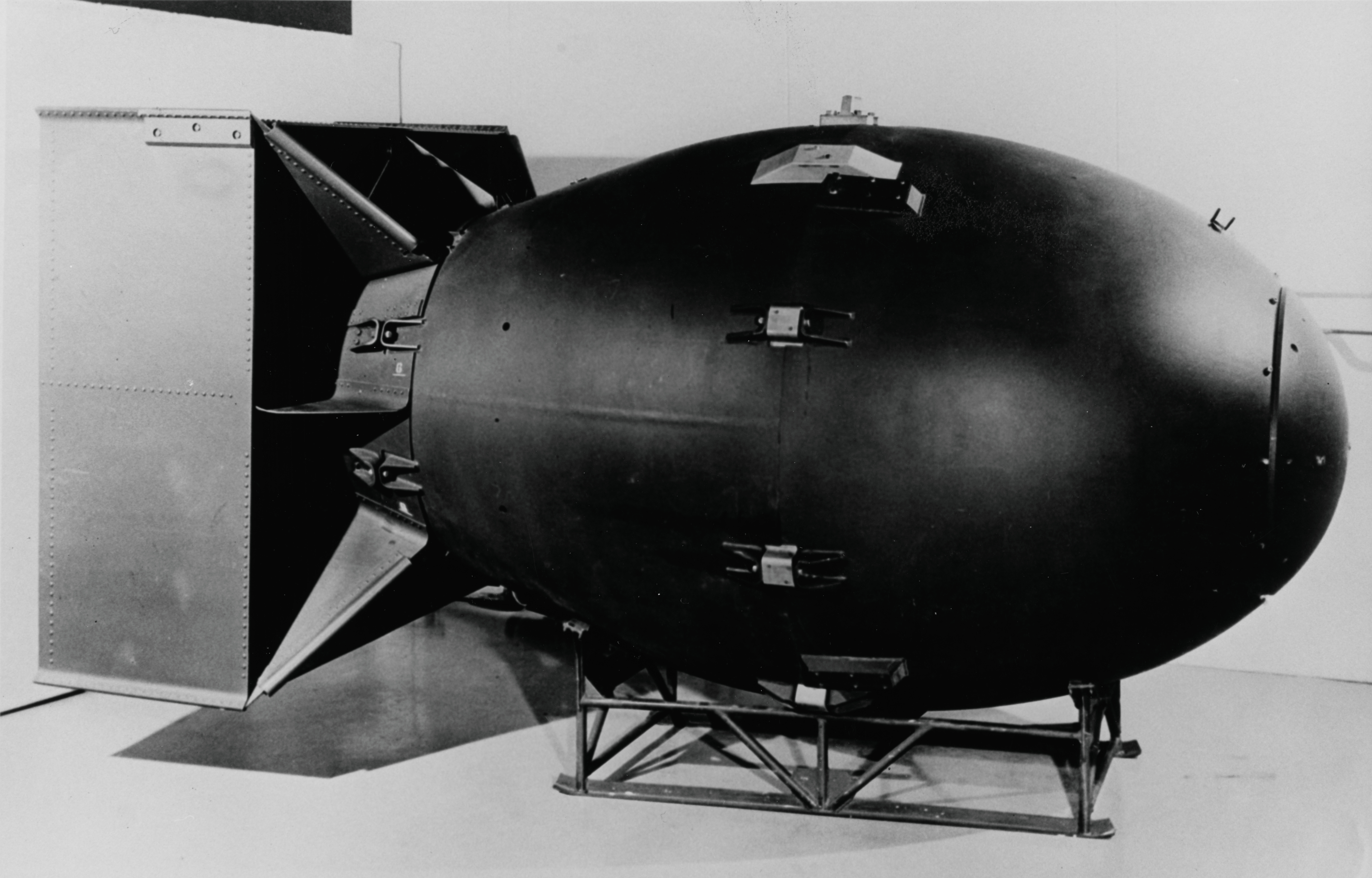
- Replica of the original Fat Man bomb
- Type: Nuclear fission gravity bomb
- Place of origin: United States

Production history
- Designer: Los Alamos Laboratory
- Produced: 1945–1949
- No. built: 120

Specifications
- Mass: 10,300 pounds (4,670 kg)
- Length: 128 inches (3.3 m)
- Diameter: 60 inches (1.5 m)
- Filling: Plutonium
- Filling weight: 6.2 kg
- Blast yield: 21 kt (88 TJ)

"Fat Man" (also known as Mark III) was the design of the nuclear weapon the United States used for seven of the first eight nuclear weapons ever detonated in history. It is also the most powerful design ever to be used in warfare.

A Fat Man device was detonated over the Japanese city of Nagasaki on 9 August 1945. It was the second and larger of the only two nuclear weapons ever used in warfare. It was dropped from the Boeing B-29 Superfortress Bockscar piloted by Major Charles Sweeney. Its detonation marked the third nuclear explosion in history. The name Fat Man refers to the wide, round shape. Fat Man was an implosion-type nuclear weapon with a solid plutonium core, and later with improved cores.

The first Fat Man to be detonated was "The Gadget" in the Trinity nuclear test less than a month earlier on 16 July at the Alamogordo Bombing and Gunnery Range in New Mexico. It was built by scientists and engineers at Los Alamos Laboratory using plutonium manufactured at the Hanford Site. The second nuclear explosion, and the first used in warfare, was Little Boy, a different device based on uranium. Two more Fat Man bombs were detonated during the Operation Crossroads nuclear tests at Bikini Atoll in 1946. The three tests in the next series, Operation Sandstone in 1948, used Fat Man devices with improved cores. In 1949, Fat Man was finally superseded by the Mark 4 nuclear bomb in the Operation Ranger tests.

== Early decisions ==
Robert Oppenheimer held conferences in Chicago in June 1942, and in Berkeley, California, in July, at which various engineers and physicists discussed nuclear bomb design issues. They chose a gun-type design in which two sub-critical masses would be brought together by firing a "bullet" into a "target". Richard C. Tolman suggested an implosion-type nuclear weapon, but the proposal attracted little interest.

The feasibility of a plutonium bomb was questioned in 1942. Wallace Akers, the director of the British "Tube Alloys" project, told James Bryant Conant on 14 November that James Chadwick had "concluded that plutonium might not be a practical fissionable material for weapons because of impurities". Conant consulted Ernest Lawrence and Arthur Compton, who acknowledged that their scientists at Berkeley and Chicago, respectively, knew about the problem, but they could offer no ready solution. Conant informed Manhattan Project director Brigadier General Leslie R. Groves Jr., who in turn assembled a special committee consisting of Lawrence, Compton, Oppenheimer, and McMillan to examine the issue. The committee concluded that any problems could be overcome simply by requiring higher purity.

Oppenheimer reviewed his options in early 1943 and gave priority to the gun-type weapon, but he created the E-5 Group at the Los Alamos Laboratory under Seth Neddermeyer to investigate implosion as a hedge against the threat of pre-detonation. Implosion-type bombs were determined to be significantly more efficient in terms of explosive yield per unit mass of fissile material in the bomb, because compressed fissile materials react more rapidly and therefore more completely. Nonetheless, it was decided that the plutonium gun would receive the bulk of the research effort, since it was the project with the least uncertainty involved. It was assumed that the uranium gun-type bomb could be easily adapted from it.

== Naming ==
The gun-type and implosion-type designs were codenamed "Thin Man" and "Fat Man", respectively. These code names were created by Robert Serber, a former student of Oppenheimer's who worked on the Manhattan Project. He chose them based on their design shapes; the Thin Man was a very long device, and the name came from the Dashiell Hammett detective novel The Thin Man and series of movies. The Fat Man was round and fat and was named after Sydney Greenstreet's character in Hammett's The Maltese Falcon. The Little Boy uranium gun-type design came later and was named only to contrast with the Thin Man. Los Alamos's Thin Man and Fat Man code names were adopted by the United States Army Air Forces in their involvement in the Manhattan Project, codenamed Silverplate. A cover story was devised that Silverplate was about modifying a Pullman car for use by President Franklin Roosevelt (Thin Man) and United Kingdom Prime Minister Winston Churchill (Fat Man) on a secret tour of the United States. Air Forces personnel used the code names over the phone to make it sound as though they were modifying a plane for Roosevelt and Churchill. Fat Man was also called the Big Boy, the Round Man, the Big Fellow and the like.

== Development ==
Neddermeyer discarded Serber and Tolman's initial concept of implosion as assembling a series of pieces in favor of one in which a hollow sphere was imploded by an explosive shell. He was assisted in this work by Hugh Bradner, Charles Critchfield, and John Streib. L. T. E. Thompson was brought in as a consultant and discussed the problem with Neddermeyer in June 1943. Thompson was skeptical that an implosion could be made sufficiently symmetric. Oppenheimer arranged for Neddermeyer and Edwin McMillan to visit the National Defense Research Committee's Explosives Research Laboratory near the laboratories of the Bureau of Mines in Bruceton, Pennsylvania (a Pittsburgh suburb), where they spoke to George Kistiakowsky and his team. But Neddermeyer's efforts in July and August at imploding tubes to produce cylinders tended to produce objects that resembled rocks. Neddermeyer was the only person who believed that implosion was practical, and only his enthusiasm kept the project alive.

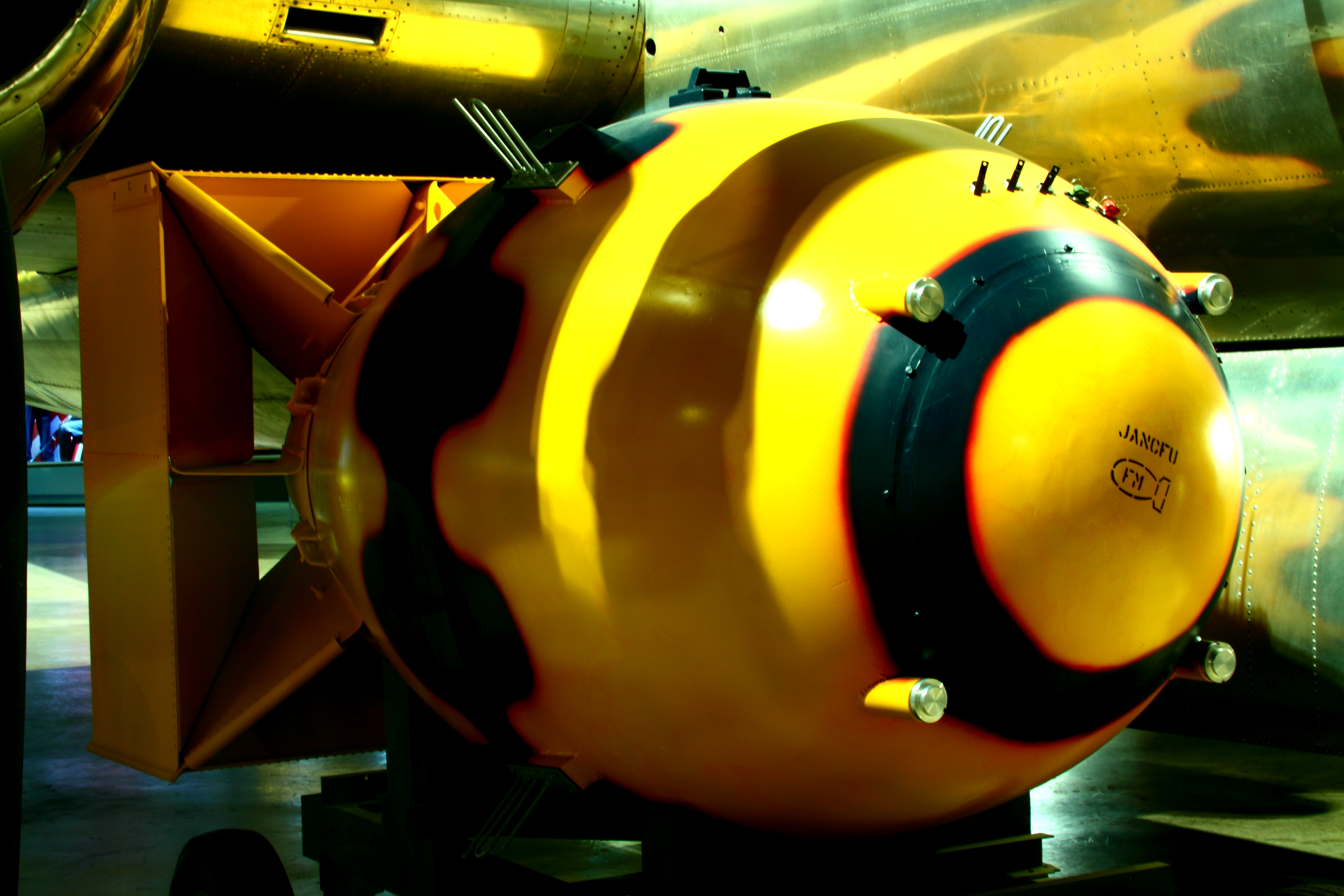
Replica mockup of a Fat Man displayed in the National Museum of the United States Air Force, beside the Bockscar B-29 that dropped the original device – black liquid asphalt sealant was sprayed over the original bomb casing's seams, simulated on the mockup.

Oppenheimer brought John von Neumann to Los Alamos in September to take a fresh look at implosion. After reviewing Neddermeyer's studies, and discussing the matter with Edward Teller, von Neumann suggested the use of high explosives in shaped charges to implode a sphere, which he showed could not only result in a faster assembly of fissile material than was possible with the gun method, but greatly reduce the amount of material required because of the resulting higher density. The idea that, under such pressures, the plutonium metal would be compressed came from Teller, whose knowledge of how dense metals behaved under heavy pressure was influenced by his pre-war theoretical studies of the Earth's core with George Gamow. The prospect of more-efficient nuclear weapons impressed Oppenheimer, Teller, and Hans Bethe, but they decided that an expert on explosives would be required. Kistiakowsky's name was immediately suggested, and Kistiakowsky was brought into the project as a consultant in October.

The implosion project remained a backup until April 1944, when experiments by Emilio G. Segrè and his P-5 Group at Los Alamos on the newly reactor-produced plutonium from the X-10 Graphite Reactor at Oak Ridge and the B Reactor at the Hanford Site showed that it contained impurities in the form of the isotope plutonium-240. This has a far higher spontaneous fission rate and radioactivity than plutonium-239. The cyclotron-produced isotopes, on which the original measurements had been made, held much lower traces of plutonium-240. Its inclusion in reactor-bred plutonium appeared unavoidable. This meant that the spontaneous fission rate of the reactor plutonium was so high that pre-detonation was highly likely and that the bomb would blow itself apart during the initial formation of critical mass, creating a "fizzle." The distance required to accelerate the plutonium to speeds where pre-detonation would be less likely would need a gun barrel too long for any existing or planned bomber. The only way to use plutonium in a workable bomb was therefore implosion.

The impracticability of a gun-type bomb using plutonium was agreed at a meeting in Los Alamos on 17 July 1944. All gun-type work in the Manhattan Project was re-directed towards the Little Boy, enriched uranium gun design, and the Los Alamos Laboratory was reorganized with almost all of the research focused on the problems of implosion for the Fat Man bomb. The idea of using shaped charges as three-dimensional explosive lenses came from James L. Tuck and was developed by von Neumann. The success of the bomb relied on absolute precision in all of the plates moving inward at the same time. To overcome the difficulty of synchronizing multiple detonations, Luis Alvarez and Lawrence Johnston invented exploding-bridgewire detonators to replace the less precise primacord detonation system. Robert Christy is credited with doing the calculations that showed how a solid subcritical sphere of plutonium could be compressed to a critical state, greatly simplifying the task, since earlier efforts had attempted the more-difficult compression of a hollow spherical shell. After Christy's report, the solid-plutonium core weapon was referred to as the "Christy Gadget".

The task of the metallurgists was to determine how to cast plutonium into a sphere. The difficulties became apparent when attempts to measure the density of plutonium gave inconsistent results. At first contamination was believed to be the cause, but it was soon determined that there were multiple allotropes of plutonium. The brittle α phase that exists at room temperature changes to the plastic β phase at higher temperatures. Attention then shifted to the even more malleable δ phase that normally exists in the 300–450 °C (570–840 °F) range. It was found that this was stable at room temperature when alloyed with aluminum, but aluminum emits neutrons when bombarded with alpha particles, which would exacerbate the pre-ignition problem. The metallurgists then hit upon a plutonium–gallium alloy, which stabilized the δ phase and could be hot pressed into the desired shape. They found it easier to cast hemispheres than spheres. The core consisted of two hemispheres with a ring with a triangular cross-section between them to keep them aligned and prevent jets forming. As plutonium was found to corrode readily, the sphere was coated with nickel.

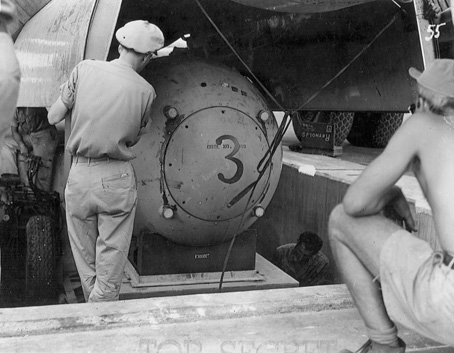
A pumpkin bomb (Fat Man test unit) being raised from the pit into the bomb bay of a B-29 for bombing practice during the weeks before the attack on Nagasaki

The size of the bomb was constrained by the available aircraft, which were investigated for suitability by Norman Foster Ramsey. The only Allied bombers considered capable of carrying the Fat Man without major modification were the British Avro Lancaster and the American Boeing B-29 Superfortress. British scientist James Chadwick advocated the Lancaster which had a limited range but had a larger single bomb bay; but this was less of a problem when the Fat Man replaced the 17-foot (5.2 m) long Thin Man. At the time, the B-29 represented the epitome of bomber technology with significant advantages in maximum takeoff weight, range, speed, flight ceiling, and survivability. Without the availability of the B-29, dropping the bomb would likely have been impossible. However, this still constrained the bomb to a maximum length of 11 feet (3.4 m), width of 5 feet (1.5 m) and weight of 20,000 pounds (9,100 kg). Removing the bomb rails allowed a maximum width of 5.5 feet (1.7 m).

Drop tests began in March 1944 and resulted in modifications to the Silverplate aircraft due to the weight of the bomb. High-speed photographs revealed that the tail fins folded under the pressure, resulting in an erratic descent. Various combinations of stabilizer boxes and fins were tested on the Fat Man shape to eliminate its persistent wobble until an arrangement dubbed a "California Parachute" was approved, a cubical open-rear tail box outer surface with eight radial fins inside of it, four angled at 45 degrees and four perpendicular to the line of fall holding the outer square-fin box to the bomb's rear end. In drop tests in early weeks, the Fat Man missed its target by an average of 1,857 feet (566 m), but this was halved by June as the bombardiers became more proficient with it.

The early Y-1222 model Fat Man was assembled with some 1,500 bolts. This was superseded by the Y-1291 design in December 1944. This redesign work was substantial, and only the Y-1222 tail design was retained. Later versions included the Y-1560, which had 72 detonators; the Y-1561, which had 32; and the Y-1562, which had 132. There were also the Y-1563 and Y-1564, which were practice bombs with no detonators at all. The final wartime Y-1561 design was assembled with just 90 bolts. On 16 July 1945, a Y-1561 model Fat Man, known as the Gadget, was detonated in a test explosion at a remote site in New Mexico, known as the "Trinity" test. It gave a yield of about 25 kilotonnes (100 TJ). Some minor changes were made to the design as a result of the Trinity test. Philip Morrison recalled that "There were some changes of importance... The fundamental thing was, of course, very much the same." For certain non-atomic parts the manufacturer had not met the delivery schedule, so many tests had to be done twice over, one with all components except for the missing item, and at a critically late date with the complete assembly minus the nuclear components. So the first live tests of the missing part were conducted only a few days before it was dropped on Nagasaki.

== Interior ==
The bomb was 128.375 inches (3.2607 m) long and 60.25 inches (153.0 cm) in diameter. It weighed 10,265 pounds (4,656 kg).

Fat Man external schematic.
1. One of four AN 219 contact fuzes
2. Archie radar antenna
3. Plate with batteries (to detonate charge surrounding nuclear components)
4. X-Unit, a firing set placed near the charge
5. Hinge fixing the two ellipsoidal parts of the bomb
6. Physics package (see details below)
7. Plate with instruments (radars, baroswitches, and timers)
8. Barotube collector
9. California Parachute tail assembly (0.20-inch [5.1 mm] aluminum sheet)

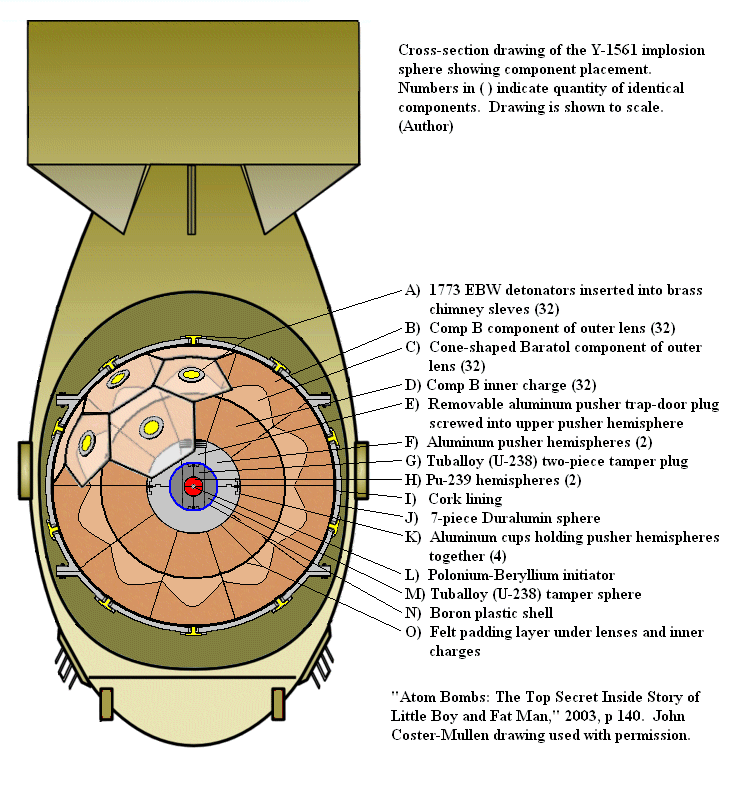
Fat Man internal schematic

== Assembly ==
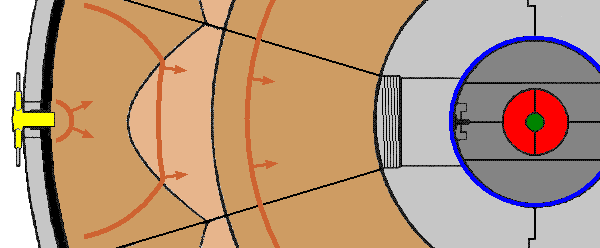
Cross section of the Fat Man "physics package". See description and colors in this section for details.

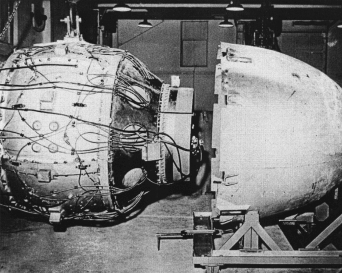
Fat Man's "physics package" nuclear device about to be encased

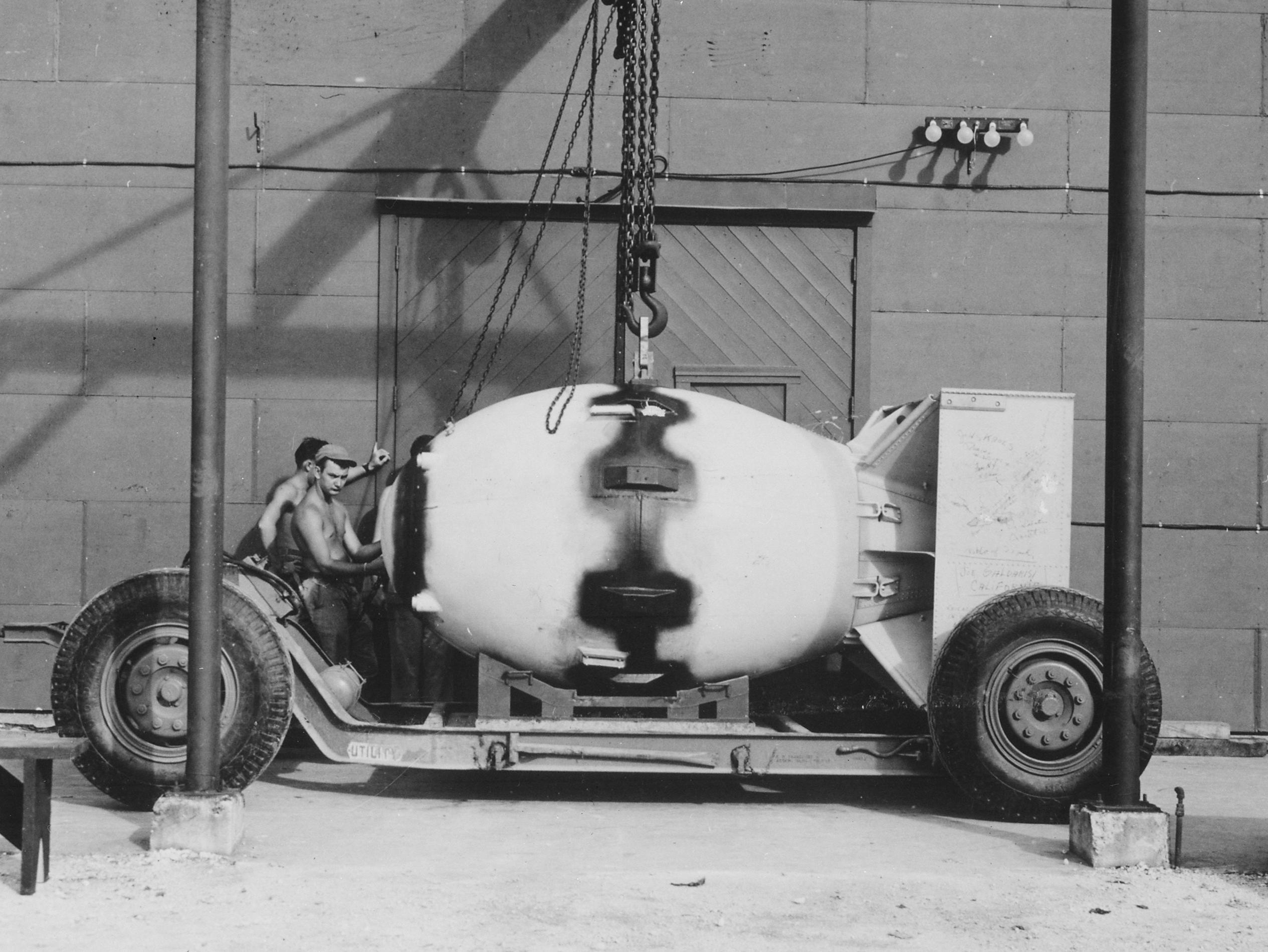
Fat Man on its transport carriage, with liquid asphalt sealant applied over the casing's seams

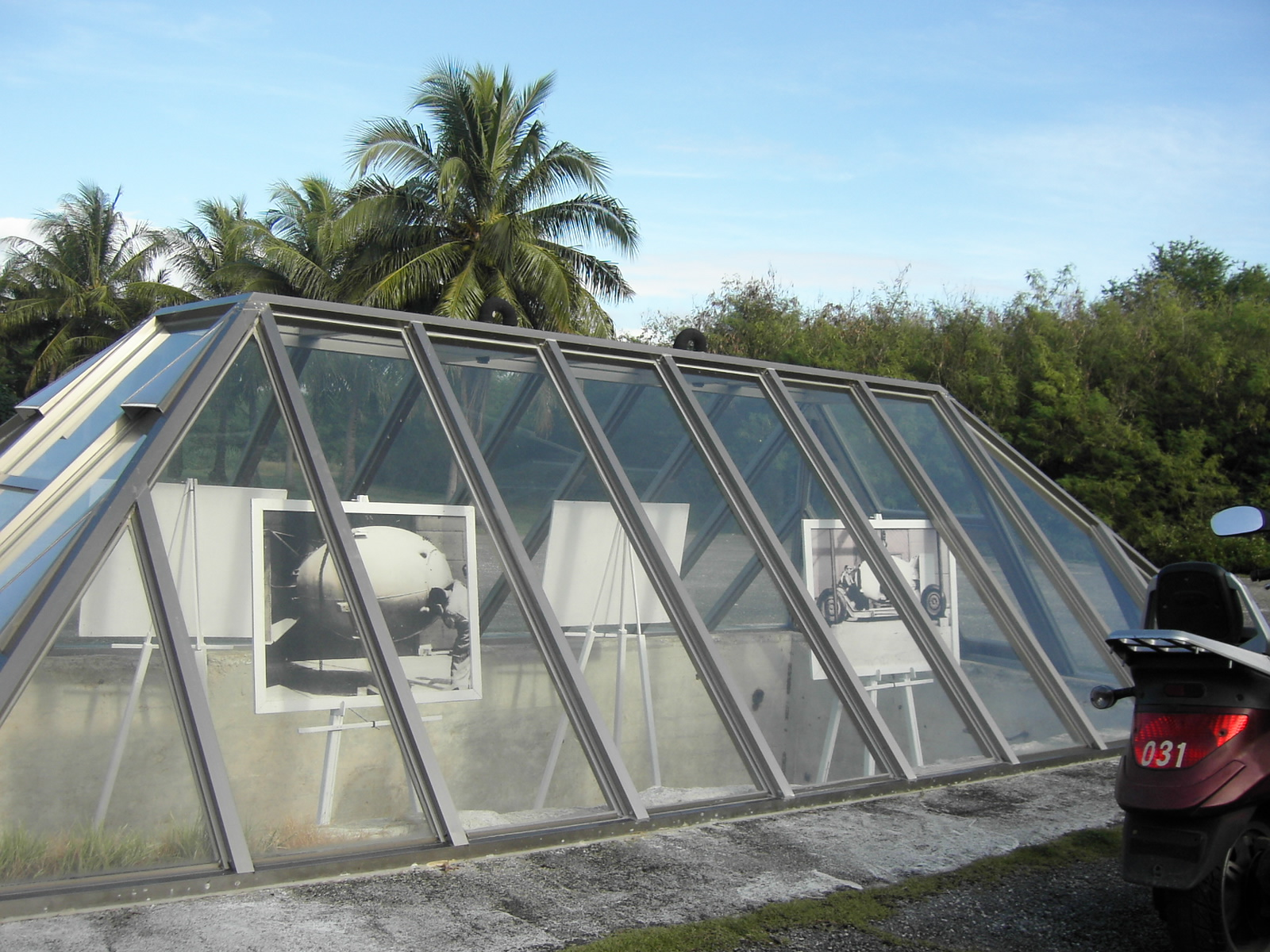
Preserved Tinian "bomb pit#2", where Fat Man was loaded aboard Bockscar

The plutonium pit was 3.62 inches (92 mm) in diameter and contained an "Urchin" modulated neutron initiator that was 0.8 inches (20 mm) in diameter. The depleted uranium tamper was an 8.75-inch-diameter (222 mm) sphere, surrounded by a 0.125-inch-thick (3.2 mm) shell of boron-impregnated plastic. The plastic shell had a 5-inch-diameter (130 mm) cylindrical hole running through it, like the hole in a cored apple, in order to allow insertion of the pit as late as possible. The missing tamper cylinder containing the pit could be slipped in through a hole in the surrounding 18.5-inch-diameter (470 mm) aluminum pusher. The pit was warm to the touch, emitting 2.4 W/kg-Pu, about 15 W for the 6.19-kilogram (13.6 lb) core.

The explosion symmetrically compressed the plutonium to twice its normal density before the "Urchin" added free neutrons to initiate a fission chain reaction.

- An exploding-bridgewire detonator simultaneously starts a detonation wave in each of the 32 tapered high-explosive columns (positioned around the explosive material at the face centers of a truncated icosahedron, a geometry popularly known from the pattern of common soccer balls).
- The detonation wave (arrows) is initially convex in the...
- ...faster explosive (Composition B: 60% RDX, 40% TNT). The wavefronts become concave in the...
- ...slower explosive (Baratol: 70% barium nitrate, 30% TNT). The 32 waves then merge into a single spherical implosive shock-wave which hits the...
- ...inner charges' faster explosive (Composition B).
- The medium-density aluminum "pusher" transfers the imploding shock-wave from the low-density explosive to the high-density uranium, minimizing undesirable turbulence. The shock-wave then compresses the inner components, passing through a...
- ...boron-plastic shell intended to prevent pre-detonation of the bomb by stray neutrons. The shock-wave reaches the center of the bomb, where the...
- ...beryllium–^{210}Po "Urchin" is crushed, pushing the two metals together and thereby releasing a burst of neutrons into the compressed...
- ...pit of the nickel-plated delta-phase alloy of ^{239}Pu–^{240}Pu–gallium (96%–1%–3% by molarity). A fission chain reaction then begins. The tendency of the fissioning pit to blow itself apart prematurely is reduced by the inward momentum of the...
- ...natural-uranium "tamper" (inertial confinement). The tamper also reflects neutrons back into the pit, accelerating the chain reaction. If and when sufficient fast neutrons are produced, the tamper itself undergoes fission, accounting for up to 30% of the weapon's yield.

The result was the fission of about 1 kilogram (2.2 lb) of the 6.19 kilograms (13.6 lb) of plutonium in the pit, or about 16% of the fissile material present. The detonation released the energy equivalent to the detonation of 21 kilotons of TNT or 88 terajoules. About 30% of the yield came from fission of the uranium tamper. In April 1945 a conservative estimate of the explosive power of "Fat Man" for the Target Committee was then equivalent to 700 to 5,000 tons of TNT.

== Bombing of Nagasaki ==
=== Assembly ===
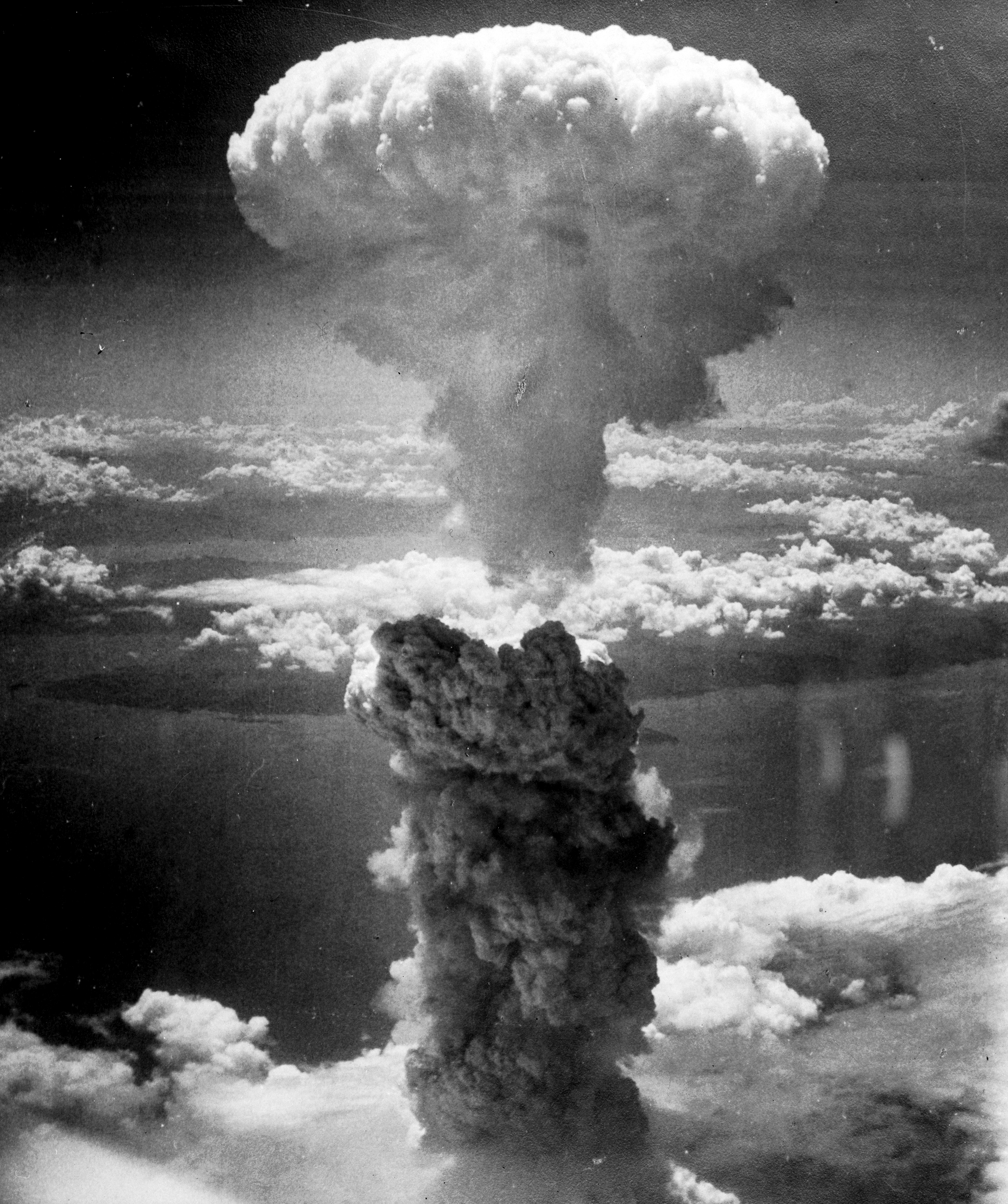
Mushroom cloud after Fat Man exploded over Nagasaki on 9 August 1945

The first plutonium core was transported with its polonium-beryllium modulated neutron initiator in the custody of Project Alberta courier Raemer Schreiber in a magnesium field carrying case designed for the purpose by Philip Morrison. Magnesium was chosen because it does not act as a tamper. It left Kirtland Army Air Field on a C-54 transport aircraft of the 509th Composite Group's 320th Troop Carrier Squadron on 26 July and arrived at North Field on Tinian on 28 July. Three Fat Man high-explosive pre-assemblies (designated F31, F32, and F33) were picked up at Kirtland on 28 July by three B-29s: Luke the Spook and Laggin' Dragon from the 509th Composite Group's 393d Bombardment Squadron, and another from the 216th Army Air Forces Base Unit. The cores were transported to North Field, arriving on 2 August, when F31 was partly disassembled in order to check all its components. F33 was expended near Tinian during a final rehearsal on 8 August. F32 presumably would have been used for a third attack or its rehearsal.

On 7 August, the day after the bombing of Hiroshima, Rear Admiral William R. Purnell, Commodore William S. Parsons, Tibbets, General Carl Spaatz and Major General Curtis LeMay met on Guam to discuss what should be done next. Since there was no indication of Japan surrendering, they decided to proceed with their orders and drop another bomb. Parsons said that Project Alberta would have it ready by 11 August, but Tibbets pointed to weather reports indicating poor flying conditions on that day due to a storm and asked if the bomb could be made ready by 9 August. Parsons agreed to try to do so.

Fat Man F31 was assembled on Tinian by Project Alberta personnel, and the physics package was fully assembled and wired. It was placed inside its ellipsoidal aerodynamic bombshell, which was painted mustard yellow, and wheeled out, where it was signed by nearly 60 people, including Purnell, Brigadier General Thomas F. Farrell, and Parsons. The acronym "JANCFU" was stenciled on the bomb's nose, standing for "Joint Army-Navy-Civilian Fuckup", a play on the acronym "SNAFU". It was then wheeled to the bomb bay of the B-29 Superfortress named Bockscar after the plane's command pilot Captain Frederick C. Bock, who flew The Great Artiste with his crew on the mission. Bockscar was flown by Major Charles W. Sweeney and his crew, with Commander Frederick L. Ashworth from Project Alberta as the weaponeer in charge of the bomb.

=== Detonation ===
Detonation of the Mark III 'Fat Man' and ensuing mushroom cloud.

A view of the mushroom cloud

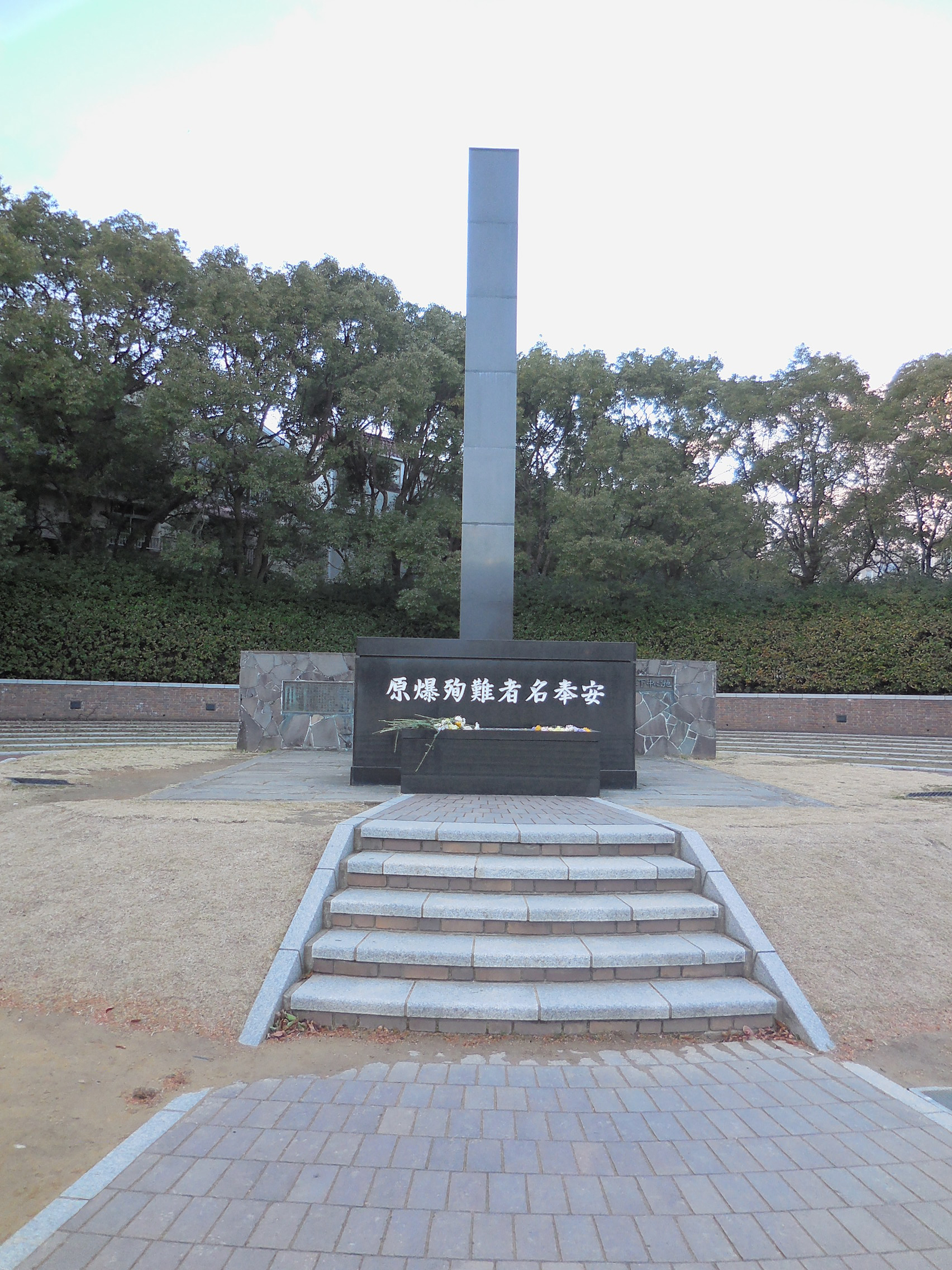
Hypocenter of Fat Man Atomic bomb in Nagasaki

Bockscar lifted off at 03:47 on 9 August 1945, with Kokura as the primary target and Nagasaki the secondary target. The weapon was already armed but with the green electrical safety plugs still engaged. Ashworth changed them to red after ten minutes so that Sweeney could climb to 17,000 feet (5,200 m) in order to get above storm clouds. During the pre-flight inspection of Bockscar, the flight engineer notified Sweeney that an inoperative fuel transfer pump made it impossible to use 640 US gallons (2,400 L) of fuel carried in a reserve tank. This fuel would still have to be carried all the way to Japan and back, consuming still more fuel. Replacing the pump would take hours; moving the Fat Man to another aircraft might take just as long and was dangerous as well, as the bomb was live. Colonel Paul Tibbets and Sweeney therefore elected to have Bockscar continue the mission.

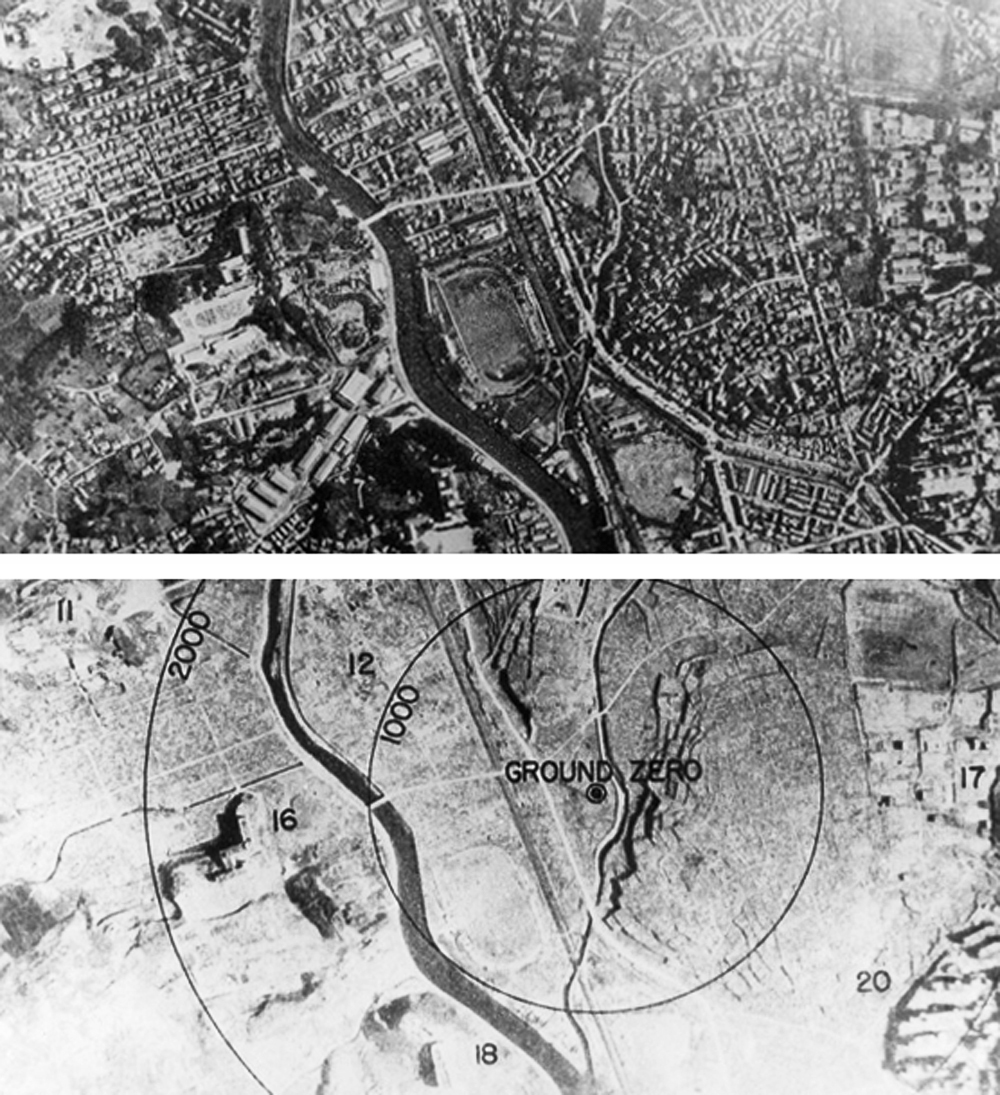
Effects of the Fat Man's detonation on Nagasaki

Kokura was obscured by clouds and drifting smoke from fires started by a major firebombing raid by 224 B-29s on nearby Yahata the previous day. This covered 70% of the area over Kokura, obscuring the aiming point. Three bomb runs were made over the next 50 minutes, burning fuel and repeatedly exposing the aircraft to the heavy defenses of Yahata, but the bombardier was unable to drop visually. By the time of the third bomb run, Japanese anti-aircraft fire was getting close; Second Lieutenant Jacob Beser was monitoring Japanese communications, and he reported activity on the Japanese fighter direction radio bands.

Sweeney then proceeded to the alternative target of Nagasaki. It was obscured by clouds as well, and Ashworth ordered Sweeney to make a radar approach. At the last minute, however, bombardier Captain Kermit K. Beahan found a hole in the clouds. The Fat Man was dropped and exploded at 11:02 local time, following a 43-second free-fall, at an altitude of about 1,650 feet (500 m).

An estimated 35,000–40,000 people were killed outright by the bombing at Nagasaki. A total of 60,000–80,000 fatalities resulted, including from long-term health effects, the strongest of which was leukemia with an attributable risk of 46% for bomb victims. Others died later from related blast and burn injuries, and hundreds more from radiation illnesses from exposure to the bomb's initial radiation. Most of the direct deaths and injuries were among munitions or industrial workers.

Mitsubishi's industrial production in the city was severed by the attack; the dockyard would have produced at 80 percent of its full capacity within three to four months, the steelworks would have required a year to get back to substantial production, the electric works would have resumed some production within two months and been back at capacity within six months, and the arms plant would have required 15 months to return to 60 to 70 percent of former capacity. The Mitsubishi-Urakami Ordnance Works, which manufactured the Type 91 torpedoes released in the attack on Pearl Harbor, was destroyed in the blast.

== Post-war development ==
Crossroads-Baker, 23-kilotons.

After the war, two Y-1561 Fat Man bombs were used in the Operation Crossroads nuclear tests at Bikini Atoll in the Pacific. The first was known as Gilda after Rita Hayworth's character in the 1946 movie Gilda, and it was dropped by the B-29 Dave's Dream; it missed its aim point by 710 yards (650 m). The second bomb was nicknamed Helen of Bikini and was placed without its tail fin assembly in a steel caisson made from a submarine's conning tower; it was detonated 90 feet (27 m) beneath the landing craft USS LSM-60. The two weapons yielded about 23 kilotonnes (96 TJ) each.

The Los Alamos Laboratory and the Army Air Forces had already commenced work on improving the design. The North American B-45 Tornado, Convair XB-46, Martin XB-48, and Boeing B-47 Stratojet bombers had bomb bays sized to carry the Grand Slam, which was much longer but not as wide as the Fat Man. The only American bombers that could carry the Fat Man were the B-29 and the Convair B-36. In November 1945, the Army Air Forces asked Los Alamos for 200 Fat Man bombs, but there were only two sets of plutonium cores and high-explosive assemblies at the time. The Army Air Forces wanted improvements to the design to make it easier to manufacture, assemble, handle, transport, and stockpile. The wartime Project W-47 was continued, and drop tests resumed in January 1946.

Sandstone-Yoke, 49-kilotons; utilized a newly designed 'levitated-pit' to increase yield efficiency.

The Mark III Mod 0 Fat Man was ordered into production in mid-1946. High explosives were manufactured by the Salt Wells Pilot Plant, which had been established by the Manhattan Project as part of Project Camel, and a new plant was established at the Iowa Army Ammunition Plant. Mechanical components were made or procured by the Rock Island Arsenal; electrical and mechanical components for about 50 bombs were stockpiled at Kirtland Army Air Field by August 1946, but only nine plutonium cores were available. Production of the Mod 0 ended in December 1948, by which time there were still only 53 cores available. It was replaced by improved versions known as Mods 1 and 2 which contained a number of minor changes, the most important of which was that they did not charge the X-Unit firing system's capacitors until released from the aircraft. The Mod 0s were withdrawn from service between March and July 1949, and by October they had all been rebuilt as Mods 1 and 2. Some 120 Mark III Fat Man units were added to the stockpile between 1947 and 1949, when it was superseded by the Mark 4 nuclear bomb. The Mark III Fat Man was retired in 1950.

Espionage information procured by Klaus Fuchs, Theodore Hall, and David Greenglass led to the first Soviet device "RDS–1" (above), which closely resembled Fat Man, even in its external shape.

A nuclear strike would have been a formidable undertaking in the post-war 1940s due to the limitations of the Mark III Fat Man. The lead-acid batteries which powered the fuzing system remained charged for only 36 hours, after which they needed to be recharged. To do this meant disassembling the bomb, and recharging took 72 hours. The batteries had to be removed in any case after nine days or they corroded. The plutonium core could not be left in for much longer, because its heat damaged the high explosives. Replacing the core also required the bomb to be completely disassembled and reassembled. This required about 40 to 50 men and took between 56 and 72 hours, depending on the skill of the bomb assembly team, and the Armed Forces Special Weapons Project had only three teams in June 1948. The only aircraft capable of carrying the bomb were Silverplate B-29s, and the only group equipped with them was the 509th Bombardment Group at Walker Air Force Base in Roswell, New Mexico. They would first have to fly to Sandia Base to collect the bombs and then to an overseas base from which a strike could be mounted. In March 1948, during the Berlin Blockade, all the assembly teams were in Eniwetok for the Operation Sandstone test, and the military teams were not yet qualified to assemble atomic weapons.

In June 1948, General Omar Bradley, Major General Alfred Gruenther and Brigadier General Anthony McAuliffe visited Sandia and Los Alamos to be shown the "special requirements" of atomic weapons. Gruenther asked Brigadier General Kenneth Nichols (hosting): "When are you going to show us the real thing? Surely this laboratory monstrosity is not the only type of atomic bomb we have in stockpile?" Nichols told him that better weapons would soon become available. After the "astonishingly good" results of Operation Sandstone were available, stockpiling of improved weapons began.

The Soviet Union's first nuclear weapon was based closely on Fat Man's design thanks to spies Klaus Fuchs, Theodore Hall, and David Greenglass, who provided them with secret information concerning the Manhattan Project and Fat Man. It was detonated on 29 August 1949 as part of Operation "First Lightning".

== See also ==
- Third Shot, a Fat Man-type weapon intended for a third Japanese target after Nagasaki
