= Project A =

Project A may refer to:

- Project A (film), 1983 martial arts action-comedy film
- Project A Part II, 1987 Hong Kong martial arts action-comedy film
- Project Alberta, also known as Project A, a section of the Manhattan Project
- Valorant, a video game previously billed as Project A
