= Bernard Waldman =

American physicist (1913–1986)

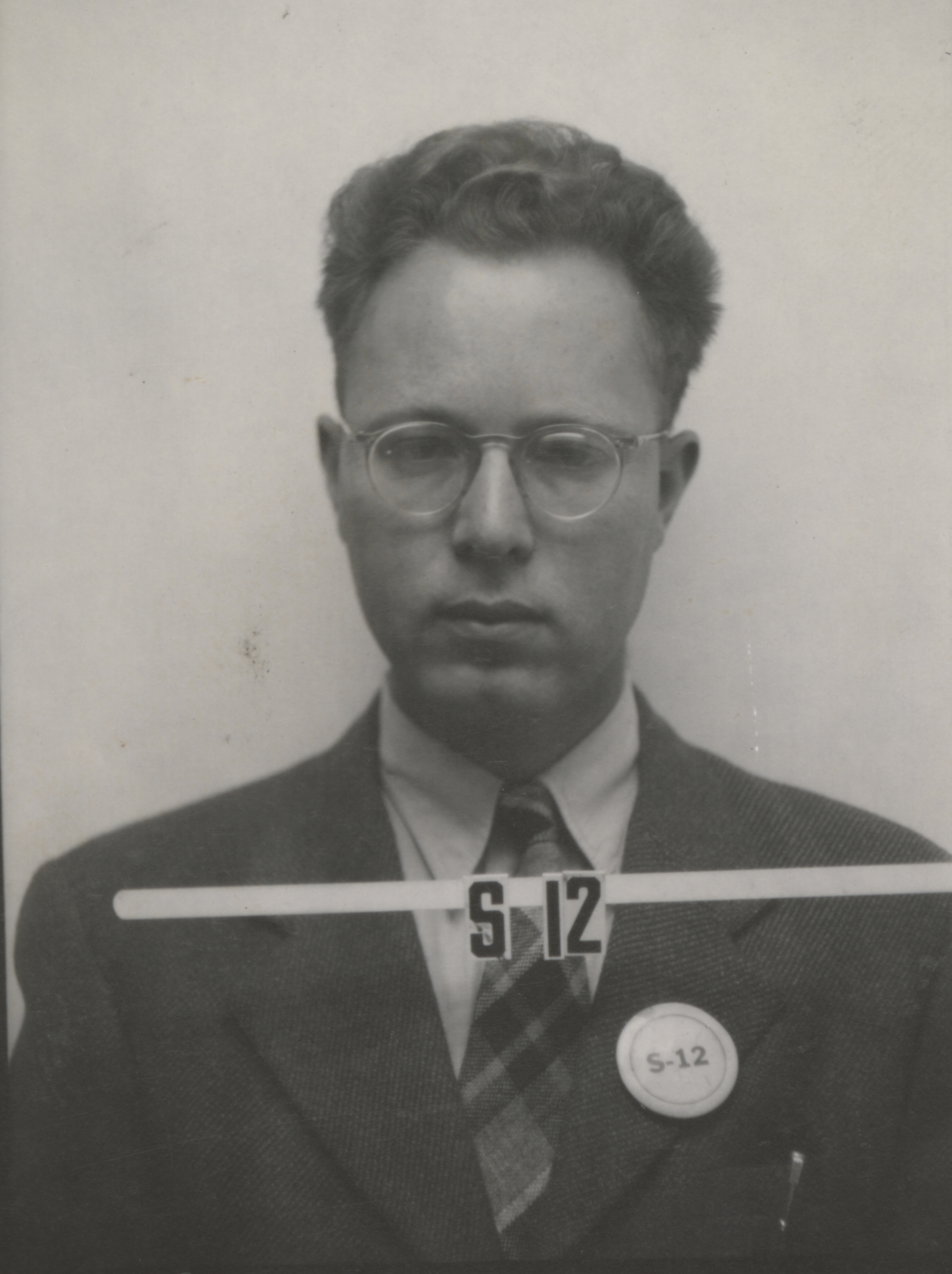
- Bernard Waldman's wartime Los Alamos security badge
- Born: October 12, 1913; New York, New York
- Died: November 1, 1986 (aged 73); Sanford, North Carolina
- Citizenship: United States
- Education: New York University
- Known for: Physics, Bombing of Hiroshima
- Scientific career
- Fields: Physics
- Workplaces: Los Alamos Laboratory; University of Notre Dame; Michigan State University
- Thesis: The Resonance Processes in the Disintegration of Boron by Protons (1939)

Bernard Waldman (October 12, 1913 – November 1, 1986) was an American physicist who flew on the Hiroshima atomic bombing mission as a cameraman during World War II.

A graduate of New York University, joined the faculty of the University of Notre Dame in 1938. During World War II, he served in the United States Navy as an engineering officer. He headed a group that conducted blast measurements for the Trinity nuclear test, and served on Tinian with Project Alberta.

After the war he returned to Notre Dame. He was director of the Midwestern Universities Research Association Laboratory from 1960 to 1964, dean of its Notre Dame College of Science at Notre Dame from 1967 to 1979, and associate director of the National Superconducting Cyclotron Laboratory from 1979 to 1983.

== Early life and education ==
Bernard Waldman was born in New York City on October 12, 1913. He attended New York University, from which he received Bachelor of Science and Doctor of Philosophy degrees. His thesis, on "The Resonance Processes in the Disintegration of Boron by Protons", formed the basis of a paper published in the Physical Review. His research supported the estimates of J. Robert Oppenheimer and Robert Serber.

Although he was a Congregationalist, Waldman joined the faculty of the University of Notre Dame in 1938. He became an assistant professor in 1941.

== Manhattan Project ==
During World War II, Waldman served in the United States Navy as an engineering officer, and was involved in construction and extension of naval bases in the United States. He took a leave of absence from Notre Dame and joined Oppenheimer and Serber at the Manhattan Project's Los Alamos Laboratory in 1943. He was assigned to Norman F. Ramsey's E-7 Group, which was part of the Ordnance (O) Division responsible for "integration of design and delivery". Most of the work involved preparing and checking instrumentation from drop tests involving dummy bombs.

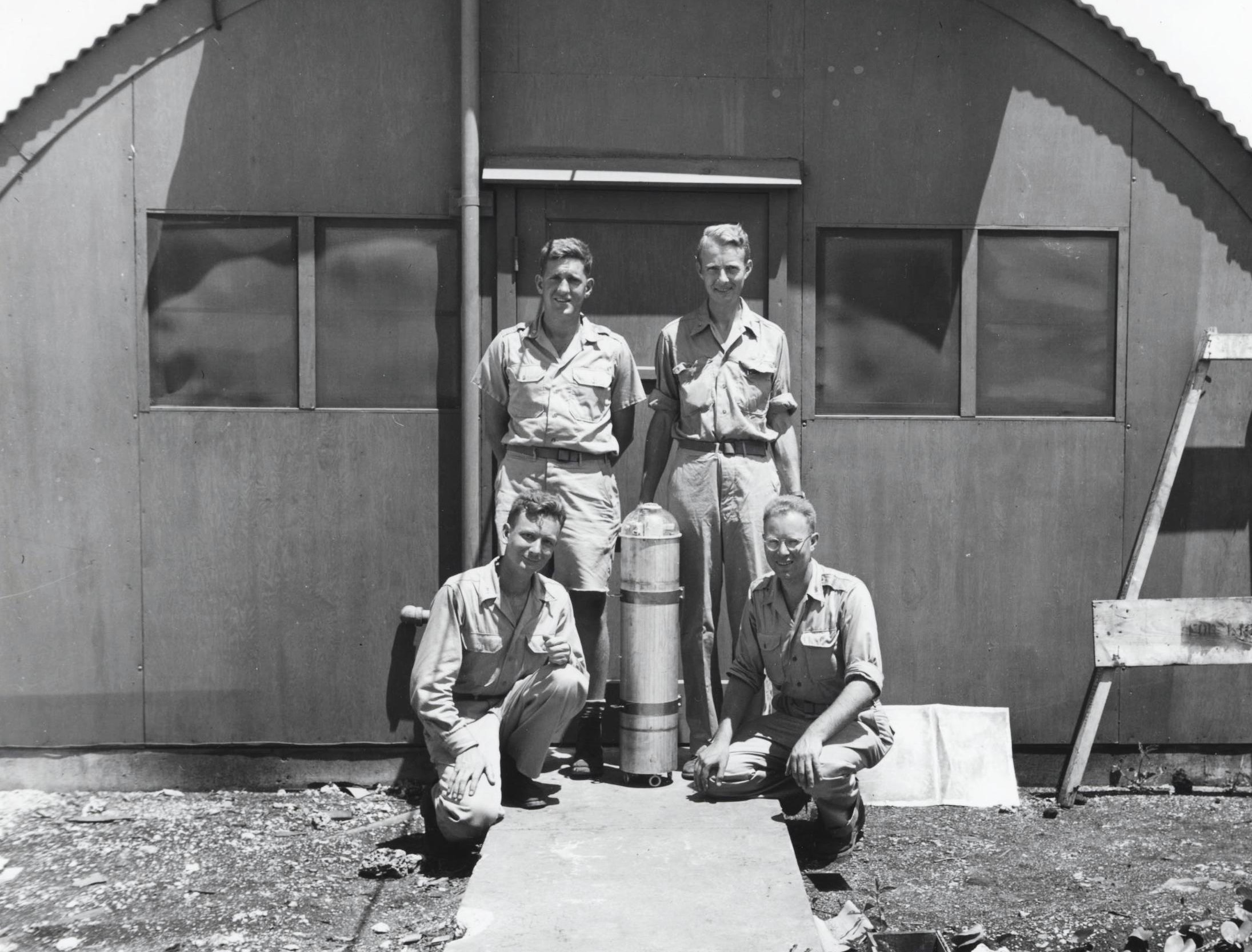
Waldman (bottom right) on Tinian with Harold Agnew (top left), Luis W. Alvarez (top right) and Lawrence H. Johnston (bottom left)

Waldman was the head of Group TR-6 (Airborne Measurements) for the Trinity nuclear test in July 1945. He developed microphones that were dropped by parachute to measure the effect of the blast. He was then assigned to Project Alberta, the part of the Manhattan Project that oversaw the preparation of facilities to test and deploy nuclear weapons, and support their use during the actual missions. As such, he participated in the atomic bombing of Hiroshima, as a camera operator on the observation aircraft. He was equipped with a special high-speed Fastax movie camera with six seconds of film in order to record the blast. Sources vary on how it came to be that there is no film of the event, with theories stating that Waldman forgot to take the lens off of the camera or that the footage was unusable or destroyed due to circumstances outside of his control.

== Later life ==
After the war ended, Waldman returned to Notre Dame, where he continued his research into the photodisintegration of deuterium and beryllium. For a time he was in charge of a 3-million volt particle accelerator that was the world`s second most powerful source of X-rays in 1949. In 1960, Waldman took a sabbatical from Notre Dame to become director of the Midwestern Universities Research Association (MURP) Laboratory. He set about fixing problems with the 50 MeV accelerator. These were resolved, but the Federal Government declined to fund MURP's activities, and Walden returned to Notre Dame in 1964. Waldman was appointed dean of Notre Dame's College of Science in 1967. He held this position August, 1979, when he retired at the age of 65. He then became as associate director of the National Superconducting Cyclotron Laboratory at Michigan State University, a position he held until 1983.

Waldman died in a hospital in Sanford, North Carolina, where he was being treated for cancer, on November 1, 1986. He was survived by his wife, Glenna and three daughters. A funeral service was held at the Basilica of the Sacred Heart on the campus of the University of Notre Dame, and he was interred in its Cedar Grove Cemetery. His papers are in the University of Notre Dame Archives.
