= Harold Agnew =

American physicist

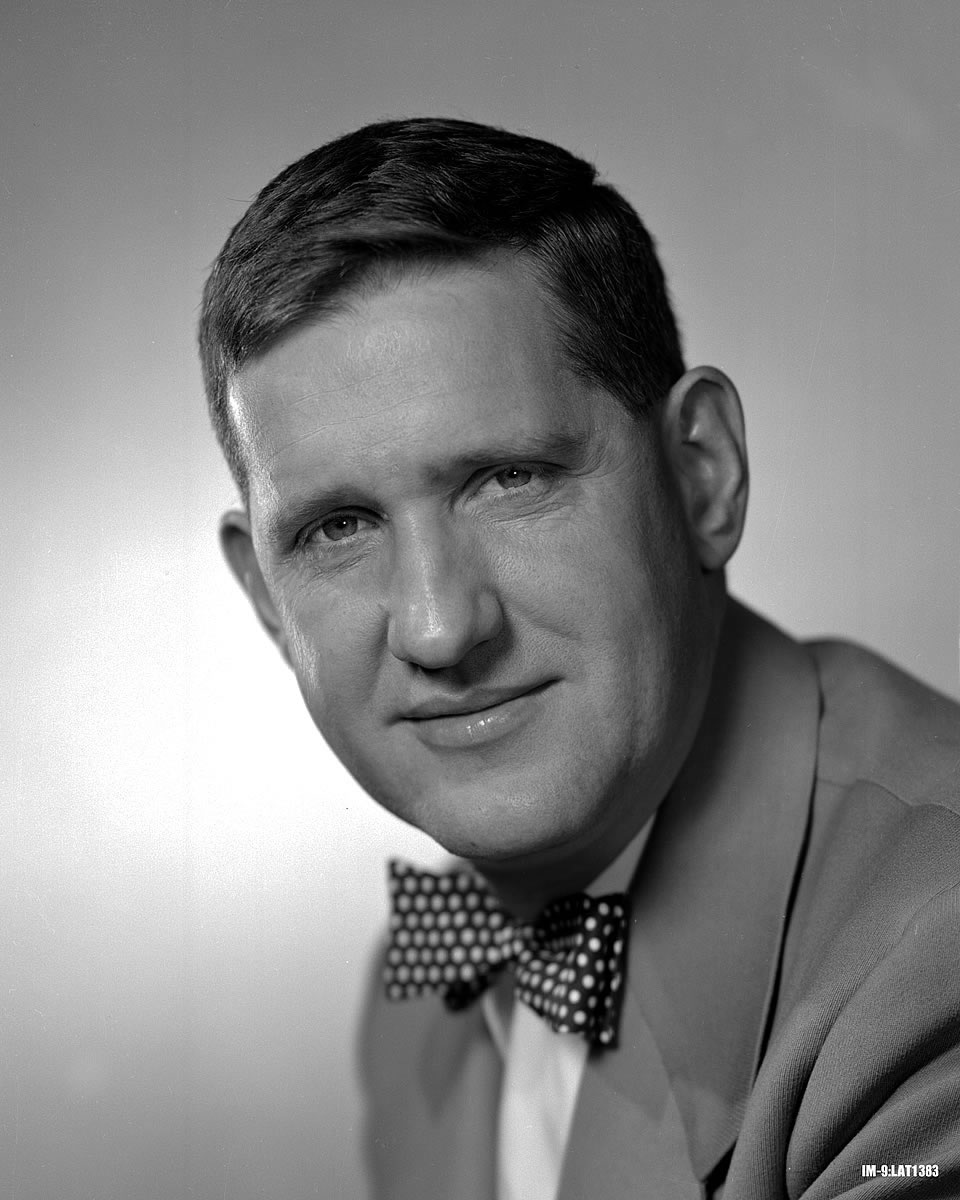
- Agnew in 1955
- Born: Harold Melvin Agnew; March 28, 1921; Denver, Colorado, U.S.
- Died: September 29, 2013 (aged 92); Solana Beach, California, U.S.
- Education: University of Denver (BA); University of Chicago (MS, PhD)
- Known for: Succeeded Norris Bradbury as director at Los Alamos
- Awards: E. O. Lawrence Award (1966); Enrico Fermi Award (1978)
- Scientific career
- Fields: Physics
- Workplaces: Los Alamos National Laboratory
- Thesis: The Beta-spectra of Cesium-137, Yttrium-91, Chlorine-147, Ruthenium-106, Samarium-151, Phosphorus-32, and Thulium-170 (1949)
- Doctoral advisor: Enrico Fermi

Harold Melvin Agnew (March 28, 1921 – September 29, 2013) was an American physicist, best known for having flown as a scientific observer on the Hiroshima bombing mission and, later, as the third director of the Los Alamos National Laboratory.

Agnew joined the Metallurgical Laboratory at the University of Chicago in 1942, and helped build Chicago Pile-1, the world's first nuclear reactor. In 1943, he joined the Los Alamos Laboratory, where he worked with the Cockcroft–Walton generator. After the war ended, he returned to the University of Chicago, where he completed his graduate work under Enrico Fermi.

Agnew returned to Los Alamos in 1949, and worked on the Castle Bravo nuclear test at Bikini Atoll in 1954. He became head of the Weapon Nuclear Engineering Division in 1964. He also served as a Democratic New Mexico State Senator from 1955 to 1961, and was the Scientific Adviser to the NATO Supreme Allied Commander Europe (SACEUR) from 1961 to 1964. He was director of the Los Alamos National Laboratory from 1970 to 1979, when he resigned to become President and Chief Executive Officer of General Atomics. He died at his home in Solana Beach, California, on September 29, 2013.

== Early life and education ==
Harold Melvin Agnew was born in Denver, Colorado on March 28, 1921, the only child of a pair of stonecutters. He attended South Denver High School and entered the University of Denver, where he majored in chemistry. He was a strong athlete who pitched for the university softball team that won a championship. He left the University of Denver in January 1942, but had enough credits to graduate Phi Beta Kappa with his Bachelor of Arts degree in June, and he received a scholarship to Yale University.

After the Japanese bombing of Pearl Harbor brought the United States into the Pacific War, Agnew and his girlfriend Beverly, a fellow graduate of South Denver High School and the University of Denver, attempted to join the United States Army Air Corps together. They were persuaded not to sign the enlistment papers. Instead, Joyce C. Stearns, the head of the physics department at the University of Denver, persuaded Agnew to come with him to the University of Chicago, where Stearns became the deputy head of the Metallurgical Laboratory. Although Agnew had enough credits to graduate, Beverly did not and had to remain behind. They were married in Denver on May 2, 1942. They then went to Chicago, where Beverly became a secretary to Richard L. Doan, then head of the Metallurgical Laboratory. Agnew and Beverly had two children, a daughter Nancy, and a son, John.

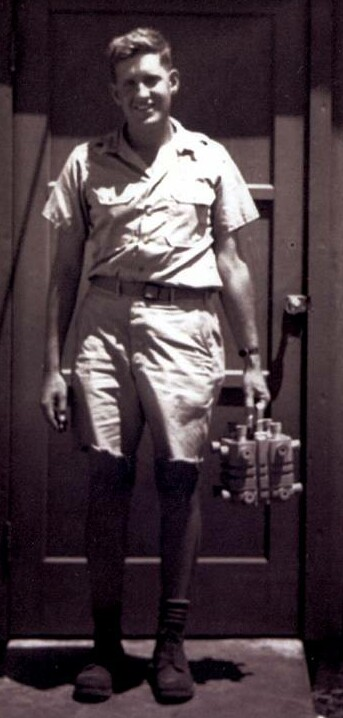
Harold Agnew on Tinian in 1945, carrying the plutonium core of the Nagasaki Fat Man bomb

At the Metallurgical Laboratory, Agnew worked with Enrico Fermi, Walter Zinn and Herbert L. Anderson. There, he was involved in the construction of Chicago Pile-1. Initially, Agnew worked with the instrumentation. The Geiger counters were calibrated using a radon-beryllium source, and Agnew received too high a dose of radiation. He was then put to work stacking the graphite bricks that were the reactor's neutron moderator. He witnessed the first controlled nuclear chain reaction when the reactor went critical on December 2, 1942.

Agnew and Beverly moved to the Los Alamos Laboratory in March 1943. Agnew, Beverly and Bernard Waldman first went to the University of Illinois, where the men disassembled the Cockcroft–Walton generator and particle accelerator while Beverly catalogued all the parts. The parts were shipped to New Mexico, where Agnew and Beverly met up with them, and rode the trucks hauling them to the Los Alamos Laboratory. There, Beverly worked as a secretary, initially with Robert Oppenheimer and his secretary Priscilla Green. She then became secretary to Robert Bacher, the head of Physics (P) Division, and later the Gadget (G) Division, for the rest of the war. Agnew's job was to reassemble the accelerator, which was then used for experiments by John Manley's group.

Los Alamos ID badges
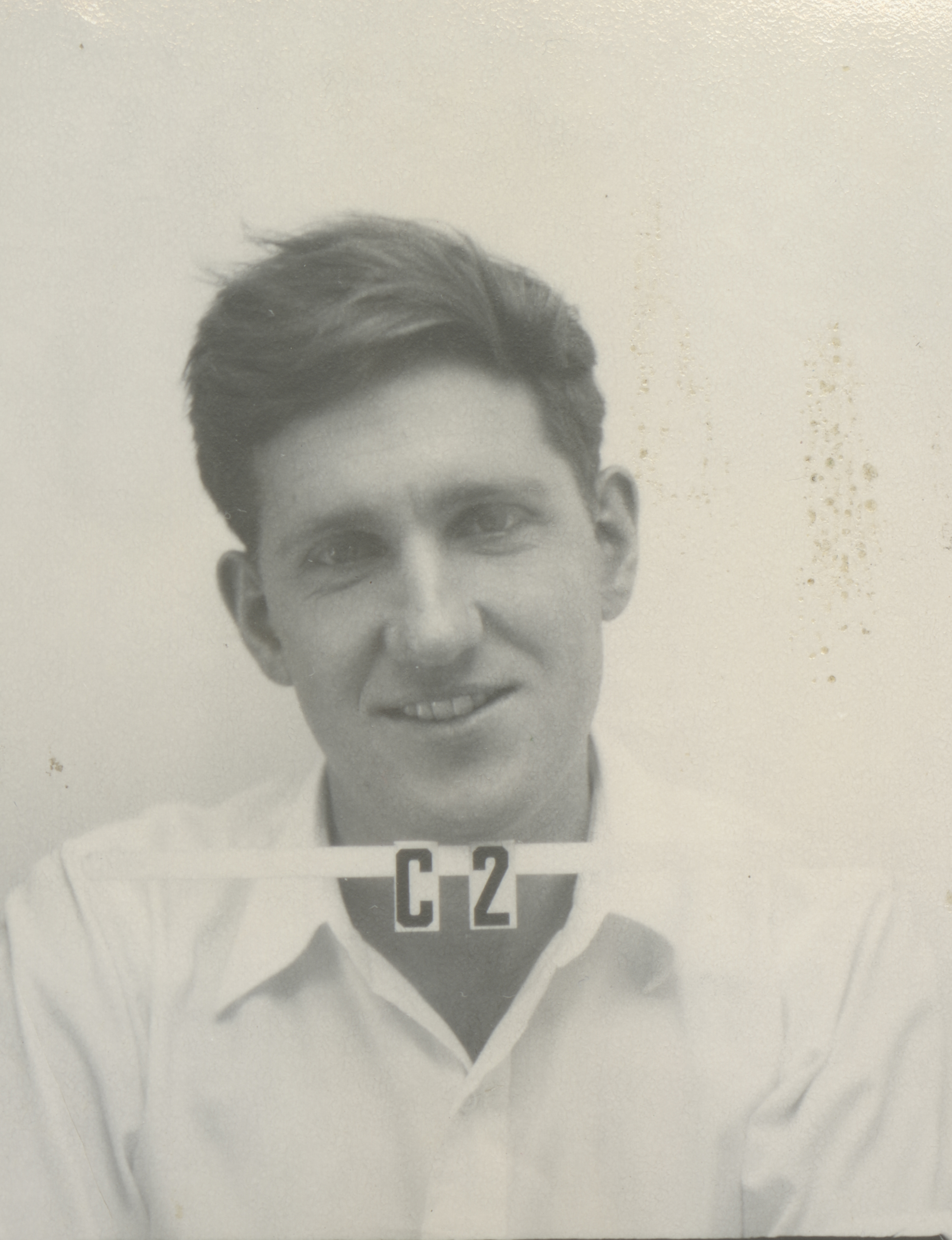
Harold M. Agnew

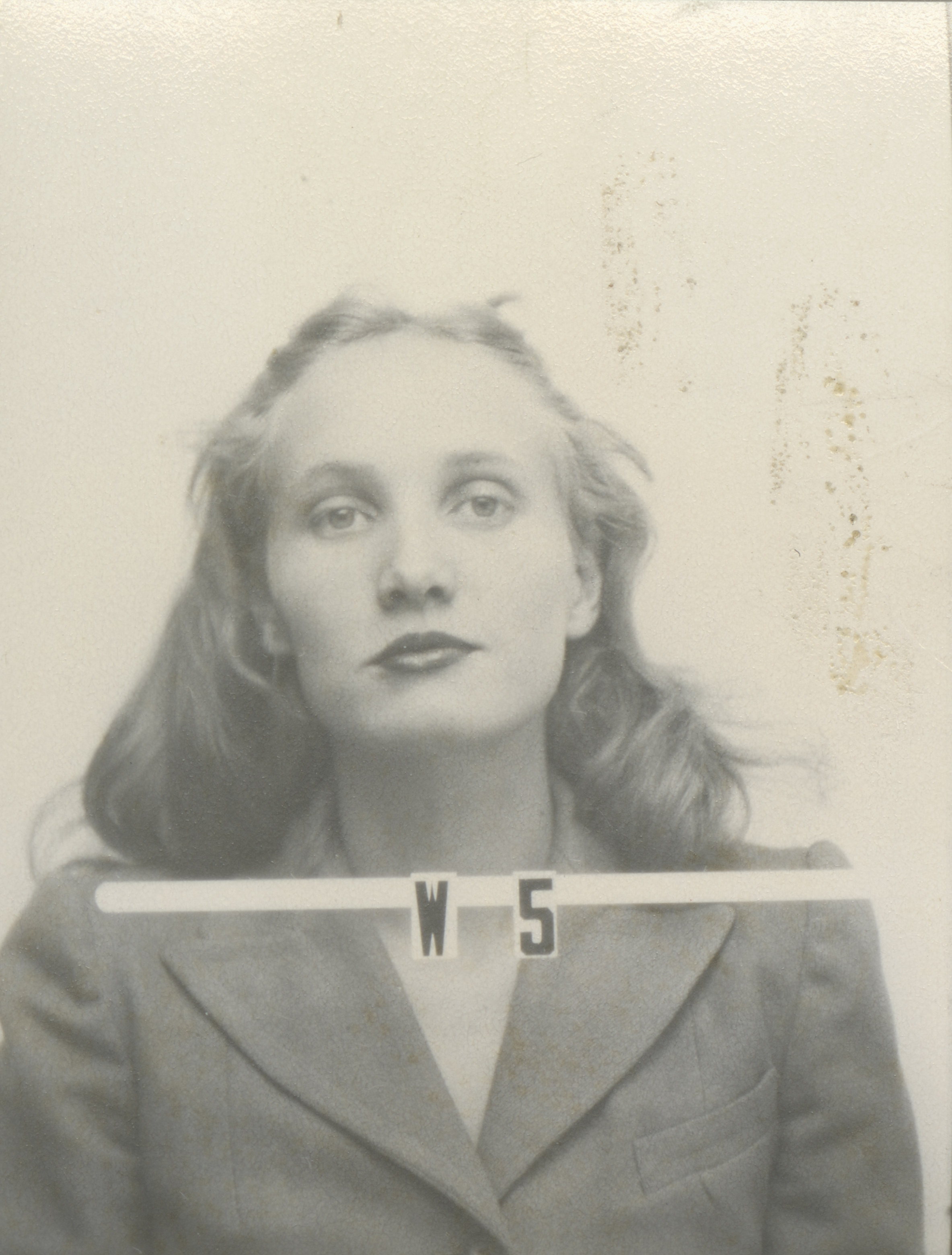
Beverly J. Agnew

When experimental work wound down, Agnew was transferred to Project Alberta, working as part of Luis W. Alvarez's group, whose role was to monitor the yield of nuclear explosions. With Alvarez and Lawrence H. Johnston, Agnew had devised a method for measuring the yield of the nuclear blast by dropping pressure gauges on parachutes and telemetering the readings back to the plane. In June 1945, he was issued an Army uniform and dog tags at Wendover Army Air Field, Utah, and was flown to Tinian in the Western Pacific in a C-54 of the 509th Composite Group. Agnew's first task was to install his yield measurement instrumentation in the Boeing B-29 Superfortress aircraft The Great Artiste.

During the atomic bombing of Hiroshima, on August 6, 1945, Agnew, along with Alvarez and Johnston, flew as a scientific observer in The Great Artiste, piloted by Charles Sweeney, which tailed the Enola Gay as the instrumentation aircraft. Agnew later recalled, "After we dropped our gauges I remember we made a sharp turn to the right so that we would not get caught in the blast – but we still got badly shaken up by it." He brought along a movie camera and took the only existing movies of the Hiroshima event as seen from the air.

After the war ended, Agnew entered the University of Chicago, where he completed his graduate work under Fermi. Agnew and Beverly stayed with Fermi and his family, due to the post-war housing shortage. He received his Master of Science (MS) degree in 1948 and his Doctor of Philosophy (PhD) degree in 1949, writing his thesis on "The beta-spectra of Cs137, Y91, Pm147, Ru106, Sm151, P32, Tm170". Fellow postgraduate students at Chicago at the time included Tsung-Dao Lee, Chen Ning Yang, Owen Chamberlain and Jack Steinberger.

== Los Alamos years ==
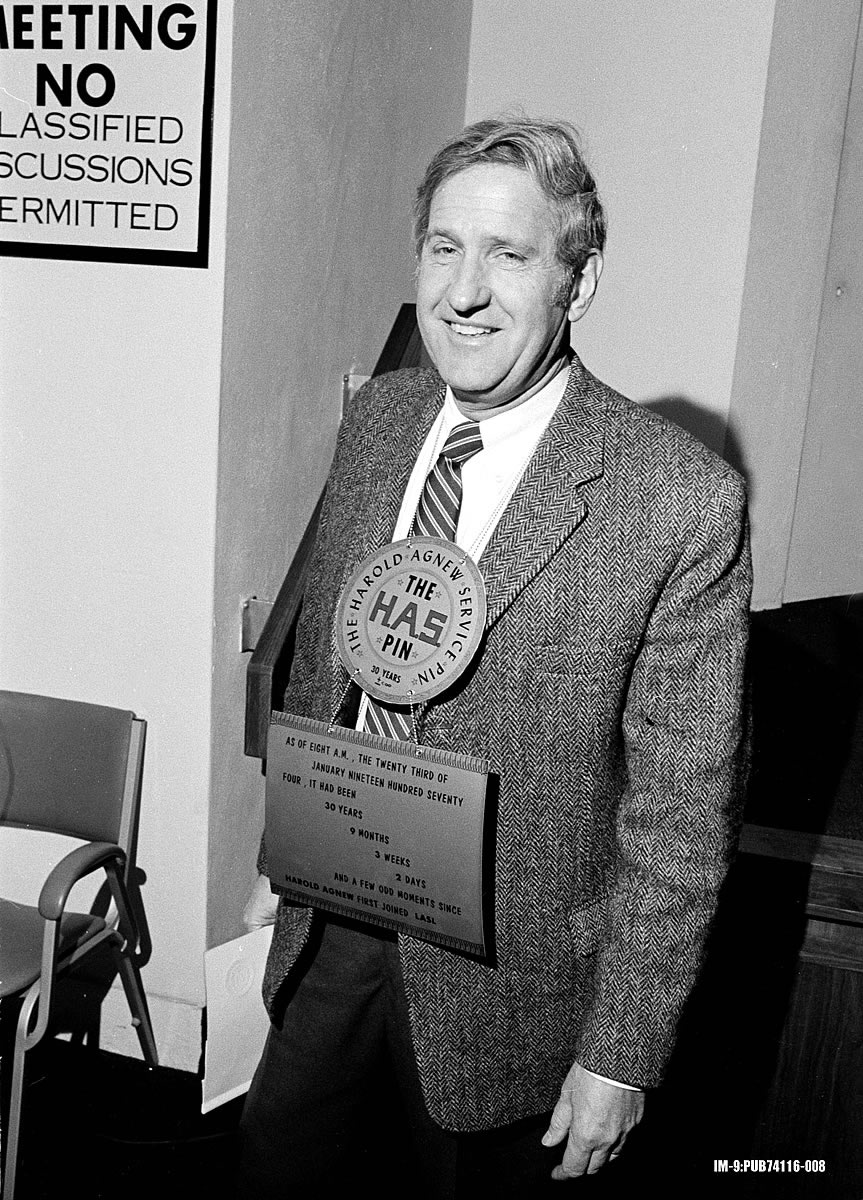
Harold Agnew receives his 30 years of service award in 1974

With his doctorate in hand, Agnew returned to Los Alamos as a National Research Foundation Fellow, and worked on weapons development in the Physics Division. In 1950, he was assigned to the thermonuclear weapons project, and was project engineer for the Castle Bravo nuclear test at Bikini Atoll in 1954. He became head of the Weapon Nuclear Engineering Division in 1964.

Agnew served as a Democratic New Mexico State Senator from 1955 to 1961. He was the first state senator to be elected from Los Alamos County. Senators served unpaid, receiving only a per diem allowance of five dollars. Since the New Mexico legislature convened for only 30 days in even numbered years and 60 days in odd numbered years, he was able to continue working at Los Alamos, taking leave without pay to attend. He attempted to reform New Mexico's liquor laws, which specified a minimum mark-up. He was unsuccessful in 1957, but the law was reformed in 1963.

From 1961 to 1964, he was Scientific Adviser to the NATO Supreme Allied Commander Europe (SACEUR). He also held a number of part-time advisory position with the military over the years. He was a member of the United States Air Force Scientific Advisory Board from 1957 to 1968, and was chairman of the Science Advisory Group of the United States Army's Combat Development Command from 1966 to 1970. He was a member of the Defense Science Board from 1966 to 1970, the Army's Scientific Advisory Panel from 1966 to 1974, and the Army Science Board from 1978 to 1984.

Agnew became director of the Los Alamos National Laboratory in 1970, when it had 7,000 employees. He took over at a time of great change. His predecessor, Norris Bradbury, had rebuilt the laboratory from scratch after the war, and many of the people he had brought in were approaching retirement. Under his directorship, Los Alamos developed an underground test containment program, completed its Meson Physics Facility, acquired the first Cray supercomputer, and trained the first class of International Atomic Energy Agency inspectors. Agnew managed to get the Los Alamos Laboratory responsibility for the development of the W76, used by the Trident I and Trident II Submarine Launched Ballistic Missiles, and the W78 used by the Minuteman III intercontinental ballistic missiles. He was proud of the work with insensitive high explosive that made nuclear weapons safer to handle. Support from the Atomic Energy Commission for reactor development dried up, but during the 1970s energy crisis, the laboratory explored other types of alternative fuels.

== Later life ==
In 1979, Agnew resigned from Los Alamos and became President and Chief Executive Officer of General Atomics, a position he held until 1985. In his letter of resignation to David S. Saxon, the President of the University of California, Agnew wrote that his decision was influenced by "dissatisfaction with University administration policies and a lack of advocacy for the total LASL [Los Alamos Scientific Laboratory] program" and "frustration with what I consider to be a continuing inequitable distribution of defense program funding by the Department of Energy between the LASL and LLL [Lawrence Livermore Laboratory]."

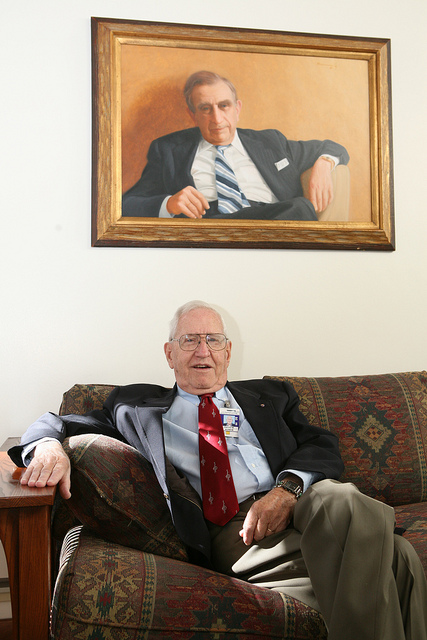
Harold Agnew at The Los Alamos Laboratory in 2006

Agnew chaired the General Advisory Committee of the Arms Control and Disarmament Agency from 1974 to 1978, and served as a White House science councillor from 1982 to 1989. He was a member of NASA's Aerospace Safety Advisory Panel from 1968 to 1974, and from 1978 to 1987. He became an adjunct professor at the University of California, San Diego in 1988. He was the recipient of the E.O. Lawrence Award in 1966, and of the Department of Energy's Enrico Fermi Award in 1978. Along with Hans Bethe, Agnew was the first to receive the Los Alamos National Laboratory Medal. He was a member of the National Academy of Sciences and the National Academy of Engineering.

A proponent of tactical nuclear weapons, Agnew pointed out in 1970 that the Thanh Hoa Bridge in Vietnam required hundreds of sorties to destroy with conventional weapons when a nuclear weapon could have done the job with just one. In a 1977 article for the Bulletin of the Atomic Scientists, Agnew argued that the fusion reactions of neutron bombs could provide "tactical" advantages over conventional fission weapons, especially in countering the "massive armor component possessed by the Eastern bloc." Citing conclusions reached by the Rand Corporation, Agnew argued that without affecting the armor of a tank, the neutrons produced by a fusion blast would penetrate the vehicle and "in a matter of a few tens of minutes to hours kill or make the crew completely ineffective." Because the neutron bomb reduced collateral damage, it could be used in a much more selective fashion than a fission weapon, thereby providing a clear "advantage for the military defender as well as for the nearby non-combatant."

Agnew maintained that no new U.S. nuclear weapon design could be certified without nuclear testing, and that stockpile reliability stewardship without such testing may be problematic. In a 1999 letter to the Wall Street Journal, he commented on the significance of allegations of Chinese nuclear espionage. "As long as any nation has a demonstrated nuclear capability and a means of delivering its bombs and warheads, it doesn't really matter whether the warheads are a little smaller or painted a color other than red, white, and blue," he wrote. "I suspect information published in the open by the National [sic.] Resources Defense Council has been as useful to other nations as any computer codes they may have received by illegal means."

In a 2005 BBC interview, Agnew stated, "About three-quarters of the U.S. nuclear arsenal was designed under my tutelage at Los Alamos. That is my legacy."

During his later years, Agnew was interviewed many times about his stance on the conflict and the usage of the bombs on Hiroshima and Nagasaki. In 2005, Agnew held a discussion in Hiroshima with bomb survivors who demanded an apology, to which he responded "Remember Pearl Harbor!" In another interview, Agnew said "There is nothing to apologize for. This is exactly why the Chinese are still upset with them. Many Japanese still refuse to take responsibility for what they did, for starting that war. They can point at us. But believe me, they did some awful bad things. We saved Japanese lives with those bombs -- an invasion would have been worse."

In another interview, he was asked how he felt about the dropping of atomic bombs on Hiroshima and Nagasaki. Agnew replied, "Oh, yeah, there is no difference to me. It’s not a copout, but we say that by ending the war so quickly, and it’s certainly true, we saved a lot of lives. Saved a lot of our lives, and then of course we need to be saying saved a lot of Japanese lives. Saved a lot of Chinese lives too. They were losing about 30,000 a week. The Japanese were just butchering them starting in Nanking in 1937. But really, I wasn’t interested. My objective was not saving lives, although that was clearly a prime factor as far as President Truman was concerned. But it was just to beat those bastards—that’s all."

Beverly died on October 11, 2011. Agnew was diagnosed with chronic lymphocytic leukemia, and died at his home in Solana Beach, California, on September 29, 2013, while watching football on television. He was survived by his daughter Nancy and son John. He had arranged to be cremated and to have his ashes interred with Beverly at the Guaje Pines Cemetery in Los Alamos.

== Notes ==
Government offices
Preceded by Norris Bradbury	Director of the Los Alamos Scientific Laboratory; 1970–1979	Succeeded by Donald Kerr
