= James Findley Nolan =

American obstetrician and gynecologist

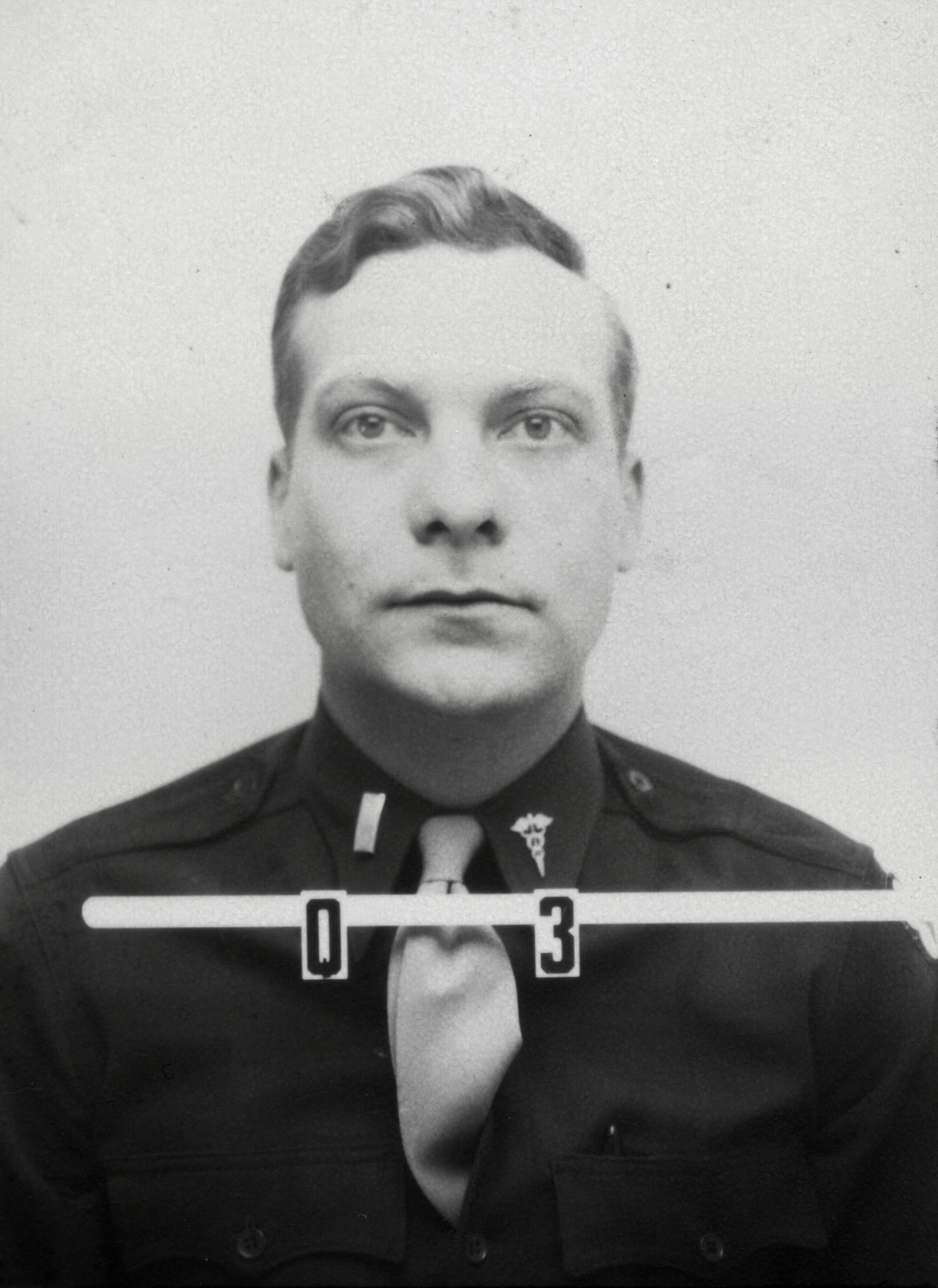
- Los Alamos wartime security badge, c. 1943
- Born: September 5, 1915; Chicago, Illinois, U.S.
- Died: June 17, 1983 (aged 67); Laguna Hills, California, U.S.
- Education: University of Missouri; Washington University
- Known for: Manhattan Project
- Medical career
- Profession: Obstetrician and gynecologist
- Military career
- Branch: United States Army Medical Corps
- Service years: 1943–1945
- Rank: Captain
- Service number: O-522870
- Conflicts: World War II: Bombing of Hiroshima and Nagasaki; Occupation of Japan
- Awards: Legion of Merit

James Findley Nolan (September 5, 1915 – June 17, 1983) was an American obstetrician and gynecologist who was the head of the medical group at the Manhattan Project's Los Alamos Laboratory during World War II. In July 1945, he escorted highly enriched uranium components of the Little Boy atomic bomb used in the atomic bombing of Hiroshima from Los Alamos to Tinian in the Pacific.

== Early life ==
James Findley Nolan was born in Chicago, Illinois, on September 5, 1915, the youngest of three sons of Joseph and Bernice Nolan. His older brothers later joined the military. He attended John Burroughs School in St. Louis, Missouri, where he met Ann Lawry, who became his wife in August 1936. He entered the University of Missouri, from which he graduated in 1935, and then the Washington University School of Medicine, which awarded him his Doctor of Medicine degree in 1938. His first child, James Lawry Nolan, was born that year.

Nolan completed a one-year internship in surgery and three years of residency in obstetrics and gynecology in hospitals in the St. Louis region. In 1942 he became a fellow at the Memorial Sloan Kettering Cancer Center, where he studied the use of radiation therapy to combat gynecologic cancer. While there, he applied for a commission in the United States Army Medical Corps, the United States having belatedly become a belligerent in World War II.

== Manhattan Project ==
=== Recruitment ===
In February 1943, Nolan received a phone call from Louis Hempelmann, a medical school classmate who had gone on to study radiology under Robert Stone at the University of California, Berkeley and had been tapped by Robert Oppenheimer, the director of the Los Alamos Laboratory (Project Y), to head the health group there. In turn, Hempelmann asked Nolan to take charge of the medical aspects of Project Y. He accepted a formal offer after meeting with Oppenheimer in Washington, D.C. Nolan and Hempelmann then set out for Los Alamos (Site Y) in March 1943. After a brief visit, they returned home to fetch their families, and established themselves at Los Alamos a few weeks later.

Nolan was commissioned as a first lieutenant in the Medical Corps in June 1943. As such, he was answerable to the post commander, who (in an exception to the normal chain of command) reported directly to Brigadier General Leslie R. Groves Jr., the director of the Manhattan Project. His military rank gave access to military supply channels and facilitated liaison between Los Alamos and the Army's Bruns General Hospital in Santa Fe, New Mexico, about 50 miles (80 km) away. Hempelmann remained a civilian. The two men divided the work between them, with Hempelmann assuming responsibility for the health and safety of the Technical Area while Nolan took charge of the post hospital and handled other medical aspects. However, the division of labor was not definite, and Hempelmann sometimes assisted Nolan, especially in the early days when the laboratory was getting established.

=== Hospital ===
To staff his hospital, which was little more than a five-bed infirmary located on the opposite side of Ashley Pond from the Technical Area, Nolan recruited two pediatric nurses from St. Louis, Harriet Peterson and Sara Dawson. Henceforth, St. Louis was the main recruiting ground for the medical staff of the hospital. Another doctor, First Lieutenant Henry L. Barnett, a pediatrician, arrived in July 1943, and third nurse, Margaret Schoppe. The two doctors and three nurses comprised the original medical staff of the hospital for which full equipment did not arrive for several months. There was also a three-bed Army infirmary at Los Alamos under First Lieutenant J. J. Horowitz. Military cases severe enough to warrant hospitalisation were sent to Bruns. All residents of Los Alamos were provided with free health care and the hospital was expanded in 1944 as the population grew.

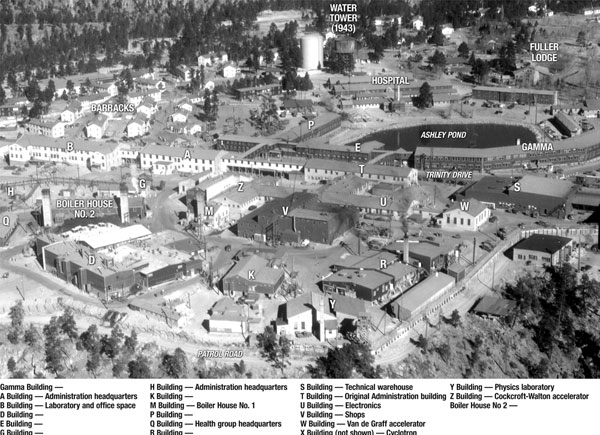
Aerial view of Los Alamos in 1945

The average age of residents of Los Alamos was around 25, around the time when many couples had children. By the end of the war, more than 200 babies had been born in Los Alamos. Because Site Y was a secret military base, their birth certificates recorded their place of birth as P.O. Box 1663, Santa Fe. Nolan delivered most of them, including his own second child, his daughter Lynne, who was born on August 16, 1943. Arrangements were made for Hemplemann to perform the delivery, but at the last minute Nolan decided that he would do it. (When Hempelmann attempted to deliver his first baby he passed out and woke up in the bed next to that of the new mother.) When a delivery was required in the middle of the night, Sergeant Myron Weigle would fetch Nolan in an ambulance. The most celebrated arrival was Toni Oppenheimer, the director's daughter, on December 7, 1944. The doctors put a sign that read "Oppenheimer" over the baby's crib for the benefit of the many well-wishers.

As the population of Los Alamos boomed, Nolan, now a captain, recommended in June 1944 that the infirmary be expanded to a 60-bed station hospital. Groves authorized an expansion to 54 beds, which occurred in fall of 1944. The extra staff required had to be drawn from the Army Medical Corps, as civilian staff were no longer procurable at this stage of the war. First Lieutenant Paul O. Hageman, an internal medicine specialist, replaced Horowitz in January 1944, and First Lieutenants Jack E. Brookes, a nose and throat specialist, and Alfred M. Large, a specialist in general surgery, arrived in the latter part of 1944. All three were graduates of the Washington University School of Medicine. In addition, nine graduates of the Washington University School of Nursing were on the staff, which grew to more than 100 men and women by the summer of 1945. Nolan's responsibilities went beyond the hospital; they also extended to the veterinarians who cared for the 15 guard dogs and 134 horses used by the security patrols.

=== Trinity ===
The workload of Hempelmann's group likewise grew, especially after plutonium began arriving at Los Alamos in February 1944. In February 1945, Nolan was asked to become the alternative group leader of the Health Group, and Barnett replaced him as head surgeon at the hospital. His primary responsibility, however, was the health and safety aspects of the Trinity nuclear test. Nolan later recalled:

Possible hazards were not too important in those days. There was a war going on... [Army] engineers were interested in having a usable bomb and protecting security. The physicists were anxious to know whether the bomb worked or not and whether their efforts had been successful... The bomb was designed as a weapon of warfare primarily utilizing blast and heat for destructive forces... radiation hazards were entirely secondary.

On June 17, 1945, Nolan went to Manhattan District headquarters at the Clinton Engineer Works in Oak Ridge, Tennessee, where he personally handed the Health Groups' recommendations for health and safety measures to Colonel Kenneth Nichols and Lieutenant Colonel John Lansdale Jr. Nolan found Groves unreceptive, fearing that some of the measures would compromise security, but Groves permitted the doctors to proceed with the health and safety plan. He did make secret arrangements with the Governor of New Mexico, John J. Dempsey, for the evacuation of the state if this was required.

=== Project Alberta ===
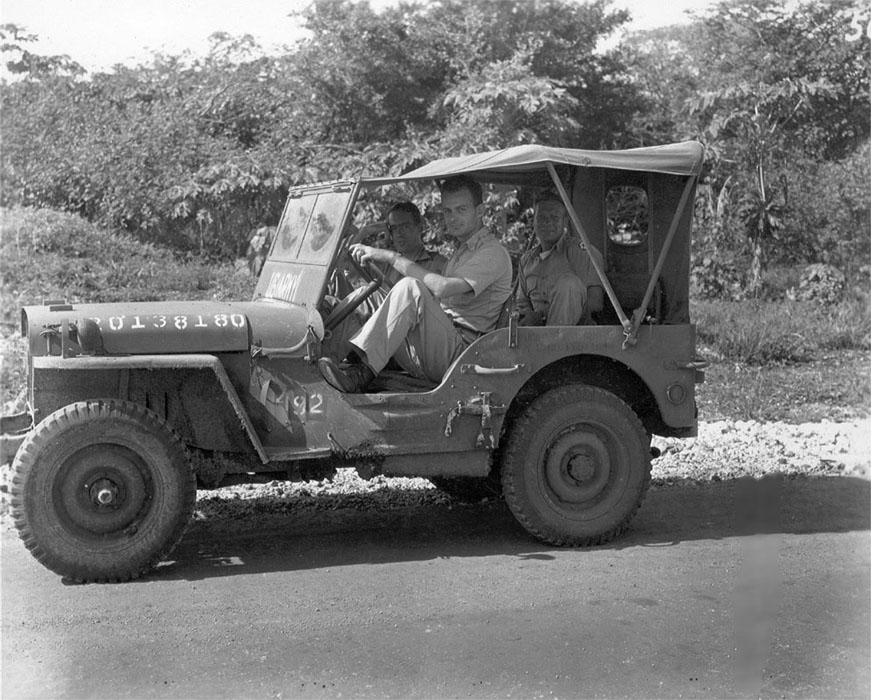
Nolan rides in the back of a jeep on Tinian, with Lieutenant Colonel Peer de Silva at the wheel

Nolan did not get to see the Trinity test. Groves selected Nolan and Major Robert F. Furman, an officer on his staff who had recently returned from Europe where he had rounded up German scientists as part of the Alsos mission, to escort the rings of highly enriched uranium that made up the projectile of the Little Boy atomic bomb. Nolan's wife Ann and their two children, Lawry and Lynne, moved to Los Angeles, where they stayed with Ann's sister, Jane Reynolds, while Nolan was overseas. For his service from July 1943 to July 1945, Nolan was awarded the Legion of Merit.

Nolan and Furman departed Los Alamos on July 14, 1945, two days before the test. The uranium went to Albuquerque, New Mexico, in a black truck escorted by seven cars. The one in which Nolan and Furman were travelling suffered a tire blowout, but otherwise everything went according to plan. The uranium, accompanied by Nolan and Furman, was flown from Kirtland Field to Hamilton Field, near San Francisco, and taken by another road convoy to Hunters Point Naval Shipyard, where it was loaded on board the cruiser USS Indianapolis. They travelled disguised as officers in the Field Artillery Branch, but the crew quickly discovered that Nolan knew nothing about artillery. The ship reached Tinian on July 26, where Nolan was met by Captain William S. Parsons, who informed him of the success of the Trinity test. The target inset for the bomb arrived by air two days later, escorted by Lieutenant Colonel Peer de Silva, Major Claude C. Pierce and Lieutenant Commander Francis A. Birch. The Indianapolis was sunk by a Japanese submarine soon after and Ann feared that Nolan had gone down with it until mail began arriving from Tinian.

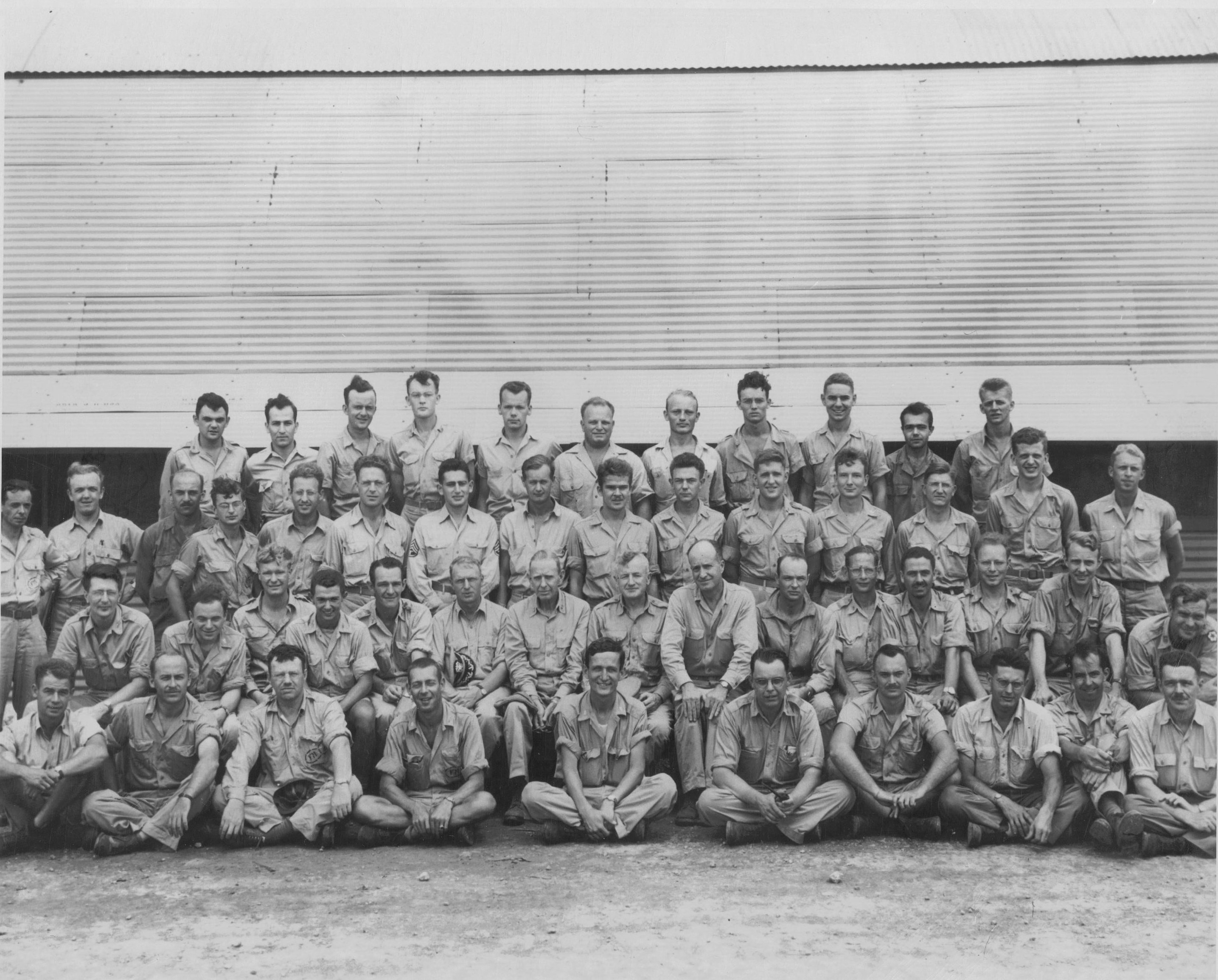
Group portrait of Project Alberta. Nolan is in the second row from the front, at the extreme right.

Shortly before the Enola Gay departed on the Hiroshima mission on August 6, 1945, Nolan instructed the emergency personnel that in the event of a crash on takeoff, they were not to approach the wreckage until he gave the all clear. When the crew returned from the mission, Nolan gave them a thorough medical examination and ran a Geiger counter over them. He was particularly concerned about the eyesight of the two crew members who forgot to bring or wear the protective goggles they had been supplied with. Nolan reassured the bombardier, Major Thomas Ferebee, that there had been no damage to his reproductive organs.

After the bombing of Nagasaki on August 9, Nolan, along with de Silva, Philip Morrison and William Penney, began planning for scientific, military and medical survey of the damage. Groves approved this mission, and designated Brigadier General Thomas F. Farrel and Colonel Stafford L. Warren, the head of the Manhattan District's medical section, to lead it. Nolan and Barrett were among those chosen to accompany the mission, but Hempelmann, being a civilian, was not. Nolan arrived in Japan by air, landing at Atsugi airport on September 5. A party that included Nolan and Warren reached Hiroshima four days later. They arrived back in Tokyo on September 15, and then flew to Nagasaki on September 19, where they stayed until October 8. They left Japan on October 12 on the Manhattan District's plane Green Hornet, just ahead of a devastating typhoon, reaching San Francisco on October 14, where he was reunited with his wife and children.

=== Operation Crossroads ===
Nolan and his family returned to Los Alamos, where he succeeded Hempelmann as head of the Health Group. Like Hempelmann, he performed this role as a civilian. Both were among the doctors who attended to Louis Slotin and others after the May 21, 1946 criticality accident that cost Slotin his life, but Nolan and Warren departed for the Marshall Islands to participate in the Operation Crossroads nuclear test series at Bikini Atoll a few days before Slotin died. Nolan departed Los Alamos on May 27 and boarded the hospital ship USS Haven the following day. He found the Navy, in its determination to demonstrate that warships were not made obsolete by nuclear weapons, uncooperative. On approaching the submarine USS Skate after the July 1 Able test, Nolan observed that his Geiger counter went off the scale but Vice Admiral William H. P. Blandy tried to make light of this in conversation with the Secretary of the Navy, James Forrestal. Nolan was one of the first to board the battleship USS New York after the test, deeming it radiologically safe. However, it was badly contaminated by the subsequent Baker test and deemed unsalvageable.

== Later life ==
After the Operation Crossroads tests concluded, Nolan returned to Washington University in St. Louis, where he became an assistant professor of obstetrics and gynecology, where he resumed his investigation into the use of radioisotopes to treat cancers, using cobalt-60 and gold-198. He served as a health and safety advisor with the Operation Sandstone nuclear test series at Enewetak Atoll in April and May 1948. He then moved to Los Angeles permanently. He was elected president of the American Radium Society in 1971, and served as president of the Western Association of Gynecologic Oncologists from 1970 to 1971.

Nolan's wife Ann died in 1978. The following year, he married Jane Davis Lamb, who had attended the John Burroughs School with Ann and Nolan. He resigned from the Cancer Center Southern California in 1982, and Nolan and Jane moved to a retirement village in Laguna Hills, California, where he died from atherosclerosis on June 17, 1983. He was commemorated by the annual James F. Nolan Award of the Western Association of Gynecologic Oncologists.
