= Project Alberta =

Section of the Manhattan Project, active 1945

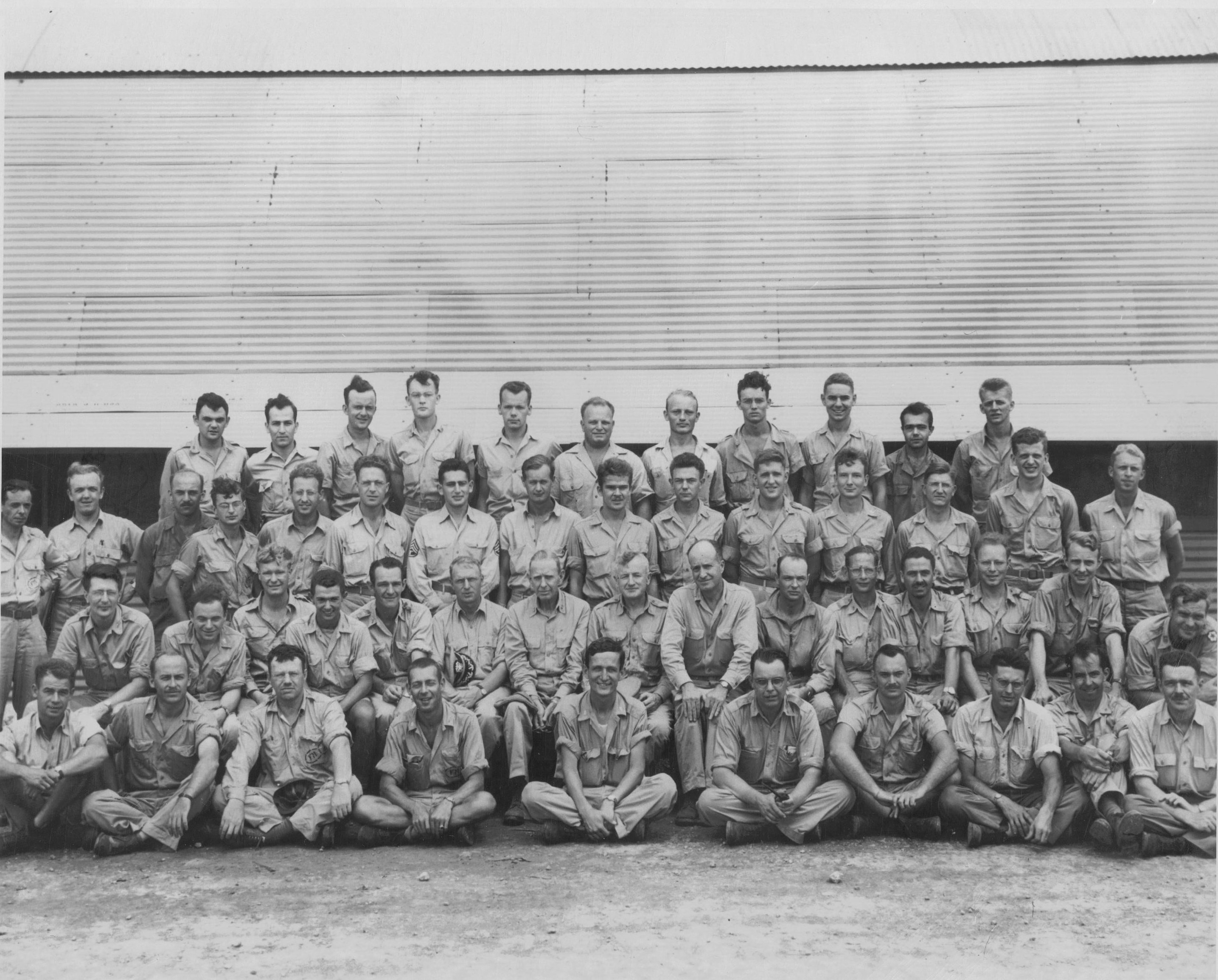
- Group photograph of Project Alberta on Tinian
- Active: March – September 1945
- Country: United States; United Kingdom
- Branch: Army Corps of Engineers
- Equipment: Little Boy, Fat Man, and Pumpkin bombs
- Engagements: Air raids on Japan; Atomic bombings of Hiroshima and Nagasaki; Occupation of Japan

Commanders
- Notable commanders: William S. Parsons

Project Alberta, also known as Project A, was a section of the Manhattan Project which assisted in delivering the first nuclear weapons in the atomic bombings of Hiroshima and Nagasaki during World War II.

Project Alberta was formed in March 1945, and consisted of 51 United States Army, Navy, and civilian personnel, including one British scientist. Its mission was three-fold. It first had to design a bomb shape for delivery by air, then procure and assemble it. It supported the ballistic testing work at Wendover Army Air Field, Utah, conducted by the 216th Army Air Forces Base Unit (Project W-47), and the modification of B-29s to carry the bombs (Project Silverplate). After completion of its development and training missions, Project Alberta was attached to the 509th Composite Group at North Field, Tinian, where it prepared facilities, assembled and loaded the weapons, and participated in their use.

== Origins ==
The Manhattan Project began in October 1941, just before U.S. entry into World War II. Most of the project was concerned with producing the necessary fissile materials, but in early 1943, the project director, Brigadier General Leslie R. Groves Jr., created the Los Alamos Laboratory, also known as Project Y, under the direction of Robert Oppenheimer to design and build atomic bombs. Within the Los Alamos Laboratory, responsibility for delivery lay with its Ordnance Division, headed by Captain William S. Parsons. With the Ordnance Division, the E-7 Group was created with responsibility for the integration of design and delivery. Led by physicist Norman F. Ramsey, it consisted of himself, Sheldon Dike and Bernard Waldman.

The size of the 17-foot (5.2 m) Thin Man bomb under development at Los Alamos in 1943 reduced the number of Allied aircraft that could deliver the bomb to the British Avro Lancaster and the American Boeing B-29 Superfortress, although the latter required substantial modification. Any other airframe would have had to be completely redesigned and rebuilt, or carry the bomb externally. Parsons arranged for tests to be carried at the Naval Proving Ground in Dahlgren, Virginia in August 1943. No B-29s or Lancasters were available so a 9-foot (2.7 m) scale model Thin Man was used, and dropped from a Grumman TBF Avenger. The results were disappointing, with the bomb falling in a flat spin. This indicated that a thorough test program was required.

Further testing of Silverplate B-29 aircraft and Thin Man and Fat Man bomb shapes was carried out at Muroc Army Air Field in March and June 1944. Testing shifted to Wendover Army Air Field, Utah, in October. Project Y controlled the scheduling and contents of the tests, which were carried out by the Flight Test Section of the 216th Army Air Forces Base Unit as Project W-47. The tests were supervised by Ramsey until November, when Commander Frederick Ashworth became Parsons's head of operations, and assumed responsibility for the test program. The test bombs were assembled by the 216th Army Air Forces Base Unit's Special Ordnance Detachment. Tests continued until the end of the war in August 1945. At first only the Ordnance Division's fuse and delivery groups were involved, but as the tests became more detailed, and live explosives were incorporated into the test bombs, other groups were drawn into the test program.

== Organization ==
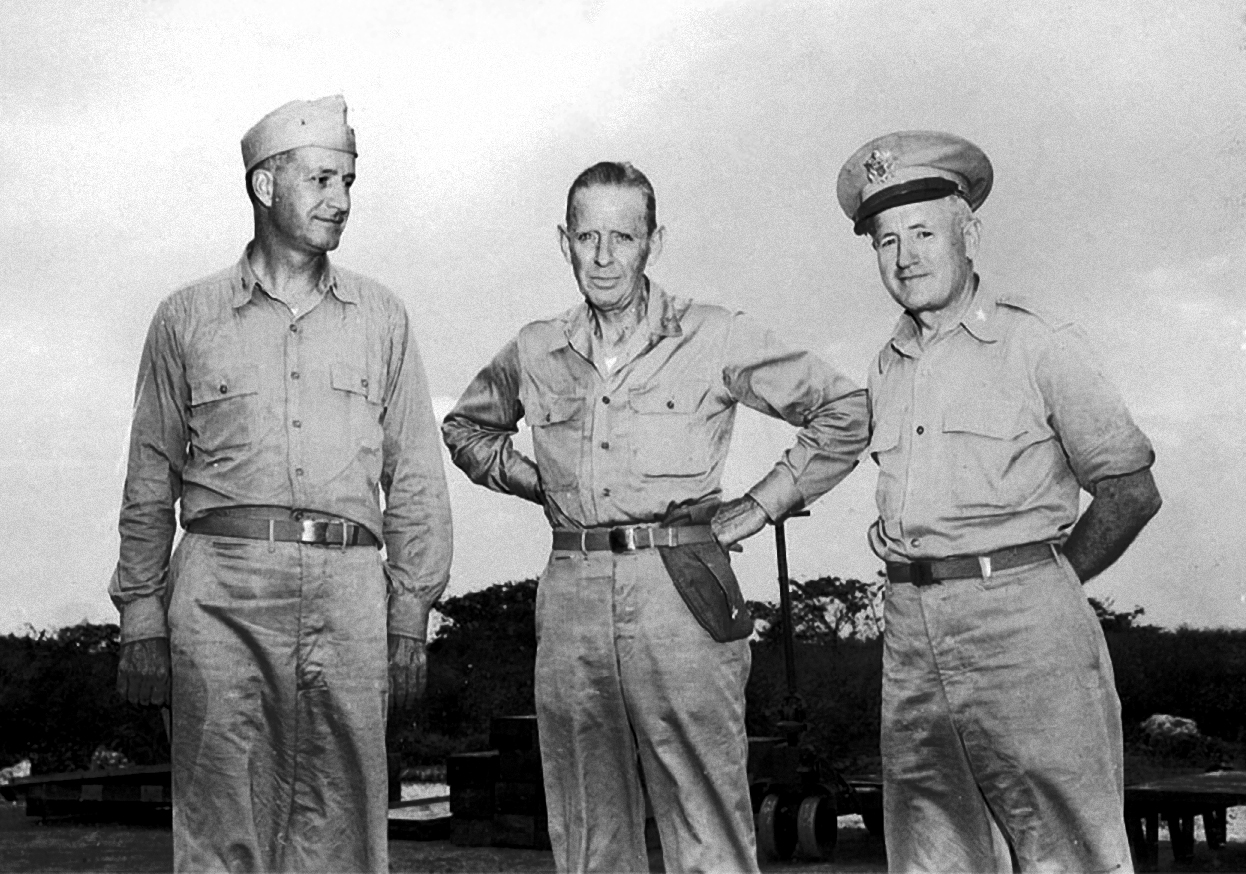
The "Tinian Joint Chiefs": Captain William S. Parsons USN (left), Rear Admiral William R. Purnell USN (center), and Brigadier General Thomas F. Farrell USA (right)

Project Alberta, also known as Project A, was formed in March 1945, absorbing existing groups of Parsons's Ordnance (O) Division that were working on bomb preparation and delivery. These included Ramsey's delivery group, now called O-2, Commander Francis Birch's O-1 (Gun) Group, Kenneth Bainbridge's X-2 (Development, Engineering, and Tests) Group, Robert Brode's O-3 (Fuse Development) Group and George Galloway's O-4 (Engineering) Group.

Parsons became the head of Project Alberta, with Ramsey as his scientific and technical deputy, and Ashworth as his operations officer and military alternate. There were two bomb assembly teams, a Fat Man Assembly Team under Commander Norris Bradbury and Roger Warner, and a Little Boy Assembly under Birch. Philip Morrison was the head of the Pit Crew, Bernard Waldman and Luis Alvarez led the Aerial Observation Team, and Sheldon Dike was in charge of the Aircraft Ordnance Team. Physicists Robert Serber and William Penney, and US Army Captain James F. Nolan, a medical expert, were special consultants. All members of Project Alberta had volunteered for the mission.

In all, Project Alberta consisted of 51 Army, Navy and civilian personnel. Army personnel were two officers, Nolan and First Lieutenant John D. Hopper, and 17 enlisted men from the Manhattan Project's Special Engineer Detachment. Navy personnel were Parsons, Ashworth, Lieutenant Commander Edward C. Stephenson, Lieutenant (junior grade) Victor A. Miller, and eight ensigns. The remaining 17 were civilians. The 1st Technical Service Detachment, to which the personnel of Project Alberta were administratively assigned, was commanded by Lieutenant Colonel Peer de Silva, and provided security and housing services on Tinian.

In addition, there were three senior officers on Tinian, who were part of the Manhattan Project but not formally part of Project Alberta: Rear Admiral William R. Purnell, the representative of the Military Liaison Committee; Brigadier General Thomas F. Farrell, Groves' Deputy for Operations; and Colonel Elmer E. Kirkpatrick, who was responsible for base development, and was Farrell's alternate. Purnell, Farrell and Parsons became informally known as the "Tinian Joint Chiefs". They had decision-making authority over the nuclear mission.

These scientists and technicians would move to Tinian as an independent unit of the Manhattan Project. According to Farrell, their primary mission: "(1) complete the bomb design for aerial delivery, then procure and assemble it; (2) continue the ballistic testing program at Wendover along with the additional modifications of the new Silverplate B-29s to perform the mission; and (3) train the ordnance crews in preparation for deployment overseas and, once on Tinian, assembling test bombs as well as the active bombs, loading them into the aircraft, and escorting them to the target -- to ensure proper delivery in case of technical problems that might develop during the flight." Parsons and Ashworth, "personal representatives of General Groves aboard the aircraft," had the title of "Weaponeer."

== Tinian ==
Manhattan Project and United States Army Air Forces (USAAF) officials agreed in December 1944 that operations would be based in the Mariana Islands, and the following month Parsons and Ashworth held a conference with USAAF officers to discuss the logistics of establishing such a base. In February 1945, Ashworth traveled to Guam bearing a letter for Fleet Admiral Chester W. Nimitz informing him of the Manhattan Project. Up to this point it had been expected that the 509th Composite Group would be based on Guam, but Ashworth was struck by the congestion in the harbor and the shortage of construction units there. USAAF suggested that he take a look at Tinian, which had two good airfields, and was 125 miles (201 km) further north, an important consideration for potentially overloaded aircraft. Ashworth toured Tinian with the island commander, Brigadier General Frederick V. H. Kimble, who recommended North Field. Ashworth agreed, and had Kimble hold them for future use.

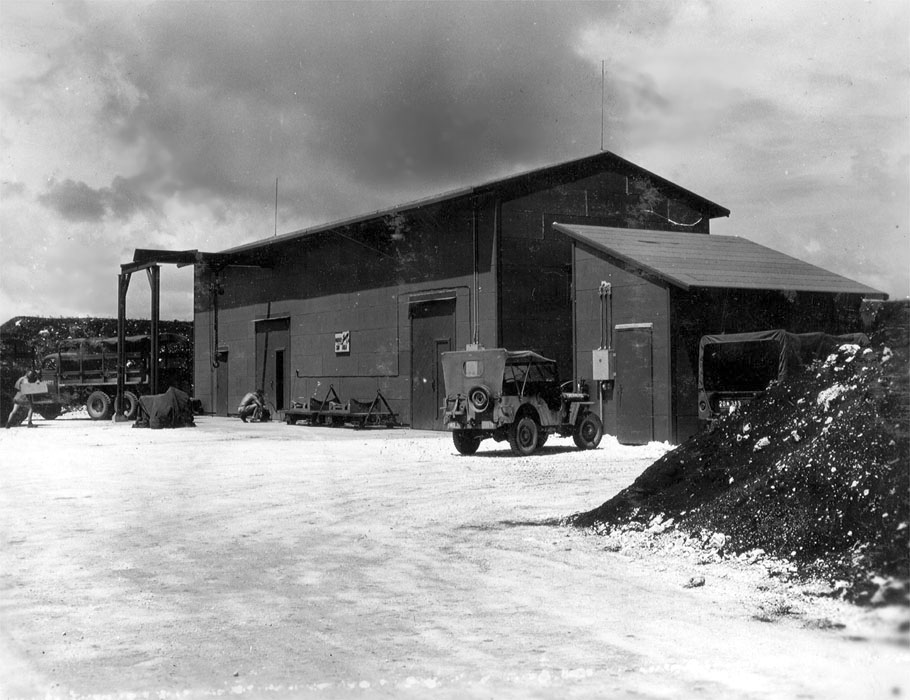
One of three identical buildings used to assemble the atomic bombs.

Groves sent Kirkpatrick to supervise construction on Tinian by the Seabees of the 6th Naval Construction Brigade. Three identical air-conditioned buildings, normally used by the navy for bombsight repair, were constructed for bomb assembly: Little Boy assembled in Building No. 1, Pumpkins assembled in Building No. 2, and the first Fat Man assembled in Building No. 3. Two redundant hydraulic lift bombing-loading pits were constructed 126 inches wide, 240 inches long, and 80 inches deep. There were five warehouses, a shop building, and assembly, ordnance and administrative buildings. Ramsey overcame the problem of how to ship through the San Francisco Port of Embarkation. The port wanted a detailed list of what was being sent so it could track it to ensure delivery, but what needed to be shipped was still subject to last-minute change. He simply designated everything as a "bomb assembly kit". Three of these, one for Little Boy, one for Fat Man and one spare, were shipped to Tinian, which was now codenamed Destination O, commencing in May. Kirkpatrick arranged for everything to be shipped direct to Tinian rather than via Guam, as was usual.

To meet the schedule, the 509th Composite Group's commander, Colonel Paul Tibbets, had his ground echelon depart Wendover on 25 April, followed by his air echelon in May. The 1st Ordnance Squadron carefully packed the Pumpkin bombs and Fat Man assemblies that they had received from Project Camel, the assemblies being sets of bomb components without the fissile pit or modulated neutron initiators. Uniforms were issued to Project Alberta's civilian personnel, and Nolan administered immunization shots. A Project Alberta Advance Party was created, consisting of Sheldon Dike for Air Force liaison, Theodore Perlman for Little Boy, and Victor Miller and Harlow Russ for Fat Man. The rest of the Fat Man team prepared the case-less Fat Man bomb used for the Trinity nuclear test. Parsons and Warner had decided that the combat use of the Little Boy would proceed regardless of the outcome of the Trinity test.

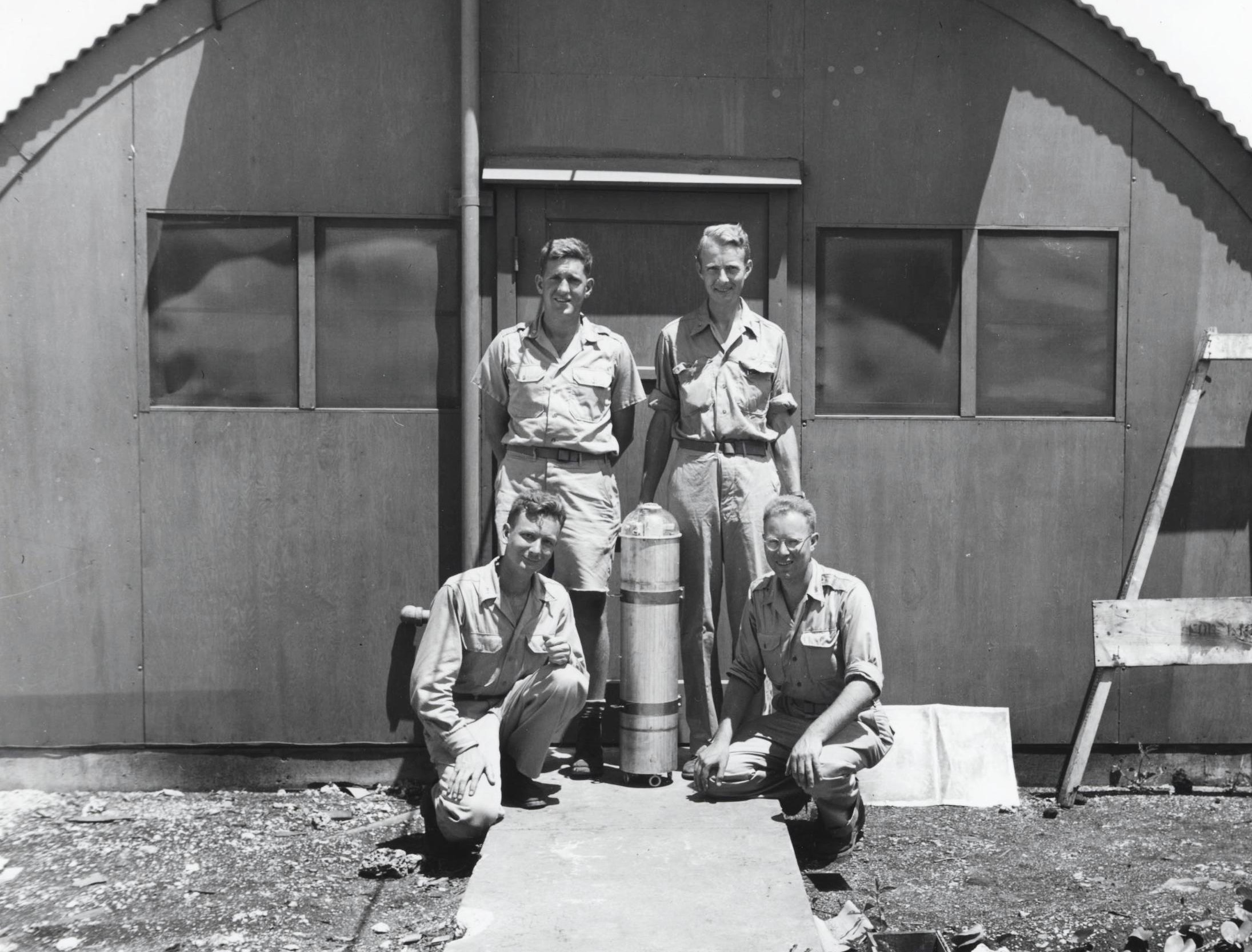
Project Alberta's Harold Agnew (top left), Luis Alvarez (top right), Lawrence Johnston (bottom left) and Bernard Waldman (bottom right) in front of the instrumentation laboratory on Tinian with a Bangometer canister. These were dropped by parachute to measure the force of the blast.

The Advance Party departed Los Alamos for Kirtland Field, New Mexico, by bus on 17 June. Accompanied by Major Bud Uanna and other members of the 1st Technical Service Detachment, they flew in C-54 "Green Hornets" of the 509th Composite Group's 320th Troop Carrier Squadron via the Port of Aerial Embarkation at Hamilton Field, California, and arrived on Tinian on 23 June. Sheldon Dike accompanied bombers of the 509th Composite Group's 393d Bombardment Squadron on practice bombing missions against airfields on Japanese-held Truk, Marcus, Rota, and Guguan. The rest of the Advance Party prepared the Little Boy assembly facility. They were joined on 6 July by a team under Edward B. Doll of the Fusing Group, who prepared for Pumpkin Bomb missions.

On 8 July, the Technical Service Detachment, and 509th Group, moved into the 13th Seabee Camp on Tinian. This included X-unit Ensigns John L. Tucker and Lesley Wilson Prohs, code name for the bomb electrical detonators, and ensign Bernard J. O'Keefe, who carried the final assembly drawings for Fat Man. On 14 July, Robert Furman departed Los Alamos with the Uranium-235 for Little Boy. The final phase of the project, dropping of the bombs in Operation Centerboard, was on schedule.

The rest of Project Alberta departed for Tinian following the successful completion of the Trinity test on 16 July. The remainder of the Little Boy assembly team arrived on 22 July, followed by Parsons, Ashworth, Purnell, Farrell and the remainder of the Fat Man assembly, Pit, Observation and Firing teams. The whole of Project Alberta was assembled on Tinian by 25 July, except for members who were couriers for bomb parts. Nolan arrived on 26 July on the cruiser USS Indianapolis, along with Major Robert Furman, Captain James F. Nolan, and Captain Charles H. O'Brien of the 1st Technical Services Detachment, with the Little Boy body and the Uranium-235 projectile slug. Three Green Hornets arrived the same day. One carried Parsons and George T. Reynolds, while a second contained the physics team. A third included Jesse Kupferberg and Raemer Schreiber with the plutonium Fat Man core. Birch accompanied the Little Boy uranium target.

The physics team included Dr. Norman Ramsey, Dr. Luis ALvarez, Dr. Roger Warner, Dr. Henry Linschitz, Dr. Robert Serber, Dr. Lawrence H. Johnston, Dr. Arthur B. Machen, Dr. Nora Asey, T/3 Eugene L. Nooker, T/4 Frank Fortine, T/3 Vincent Calsea, and T/3 Arthur W. Collins.

On 28 July, three high explosive spheres for the Fat Man bomb, left Kirtland on three B-29s bound for Tinian.

== Bombing of Hiroshima and Nagasaki ==
=== Preparations ===
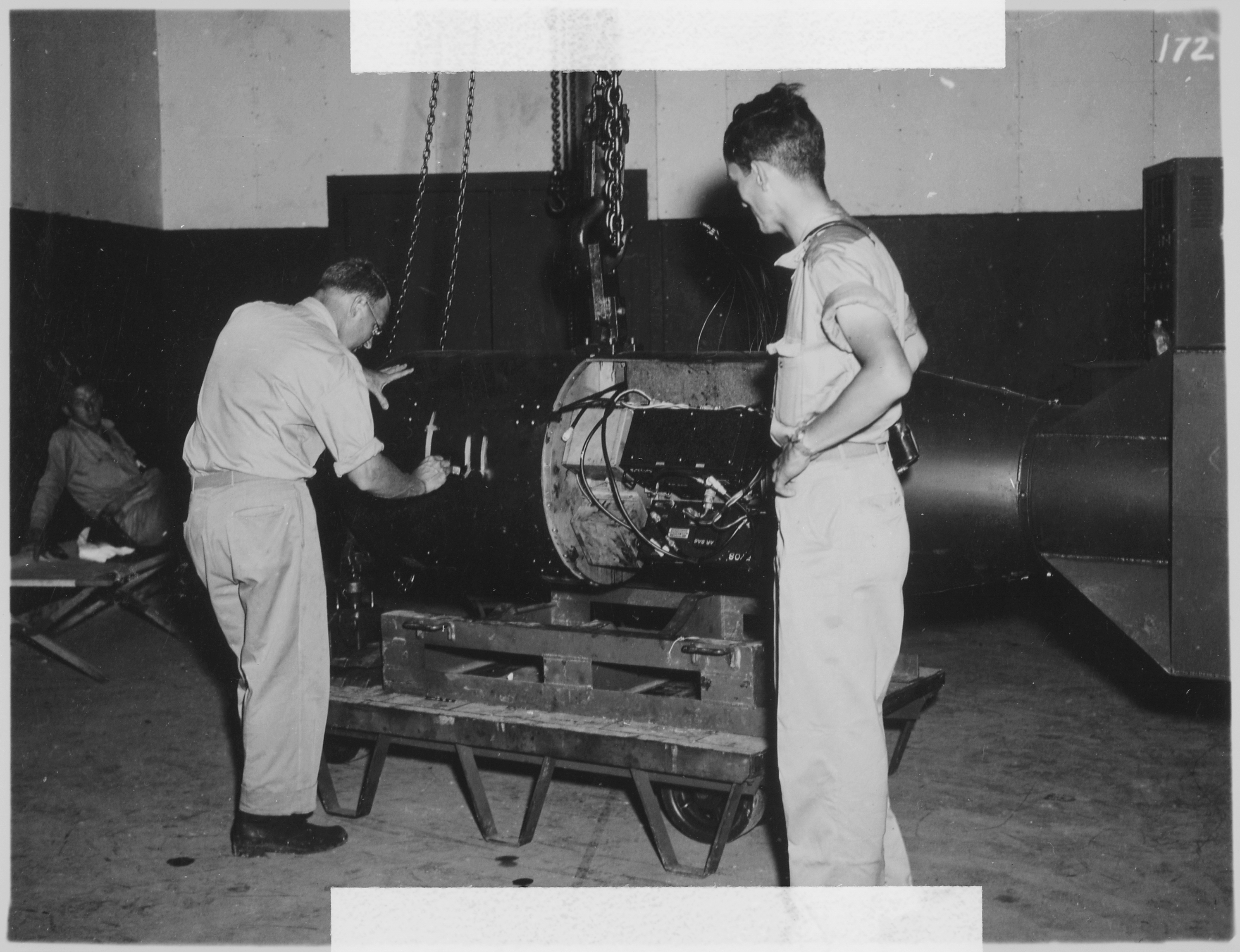
Project Alberta's Commander Francis Birch (left) assembles the Little Boy bomb while physicist Norman Ramsey watches.

Although Project Alberta had no attack orders, it proceeded with the plan to have the Little Boy ready by 1 August 1945 and the first Fat Man ready for use as soon as possible after that. In the meantime, a series of twelve combat missions were flown between 20 and 29 July against targets in Japan using high-explosive Pumpkin bombs. Project Alberta's Sheldon Dike and Milo Bolstead flew on some of these missions, as did the British observer Group Captain Leonard Cheshire. One serious incident occurred when a Pumpkin bomb was released in the bomb bay of the B-29 Strange Cargo while it was taxiing. The bomb fell through the closed bomb bay doors onto the taxiway. The aircraft and bomb came to a halt in a shower of sparks, but fire fighters doused the plane and the bomb in foam, and the bomb did not explode. The aircraft had to be jacked up to remove the bomb.

Four Little Boy assemblies, L-1, L-2, L-5 and L-6 were expended in test drops. On 23 July, the L-1 test showed the radar altimeter system and electrical system worked correctly. On 24 July, L-2 tested the fusing and firing system, that included six baro-switches in the tail cone. However, the electrical release failed, requiring a manual release. On 25 July, the L-5 test was conducted, and except for the L-2 electrical system issues, all three drops were successful. L-6 was used in the Iwo Jima dress rehearsal on 29 July, that included landing, unloading the bomb into a third pit constructed there, reloading onto another plane, returning to Tinian, and then dropping to verify the detonators worked properly. This was repeated on 31 July, but this time L-6 was test dropped near Tinian by Enola Gay. L-11 was the assembly used for the Hiroshima bomb. The Little Boy team had it completely assembled and ready for use on 31 July. The final item of preparation for the operation came on 29 July 1945. Orders for the attack were issued to General Carl Spaatz on 25 July under the signature of General Thomas T. Handy, the acting Chief of Staff of the United States Army, since General of the Army George C. Marshall was at the Potsdam Conference with the President. The order designated four targets: Hiroshima, Kokura, Niigata, and Nagasaki, and ordered the attack to be made "as soon as weather will permit after about 3 August."

Assembly of the Fat Man assembles was a complex operation involving personnel from the HE-ME, Pit, Fusing and Firing teams. To prevent the assembly buildings from becoming overcrowded and delaying work, Parsons only allowed personnel directly involved in an immediate operation within the buildings, with only two project officers within 50 feet (15 m). Three Fat Man tests drops included two inert configurations, and a third with the high explosives. The first inert test drop, F13, used plaster explosive blocks, eight live detonators, full fusing components, the Raytheon X-unit, inert nose fuses, radio informers, and smoke puffs. On 1 August, F13 was successfully drop tested. Three sets of Fat Man high explosive pre-assemblies, designated F31, F32, and F33, arrived on three B-29s of the 393rd Bombardment Squadron and 216th Army Air Forces Base Unit on 2 August. On inspection, the high explosive blocks of F32 were found to be badly cracked and unserviceable. The other two were assembled, with F33 earmarked for the live rehearsal, and F31 for operational use. On 5 August, the second inert test drop, F18, was also a success. On 8 August, the third test drop, a live rehearsal that included the high explosives, F33, was also a success.

=== Hiroshima ===
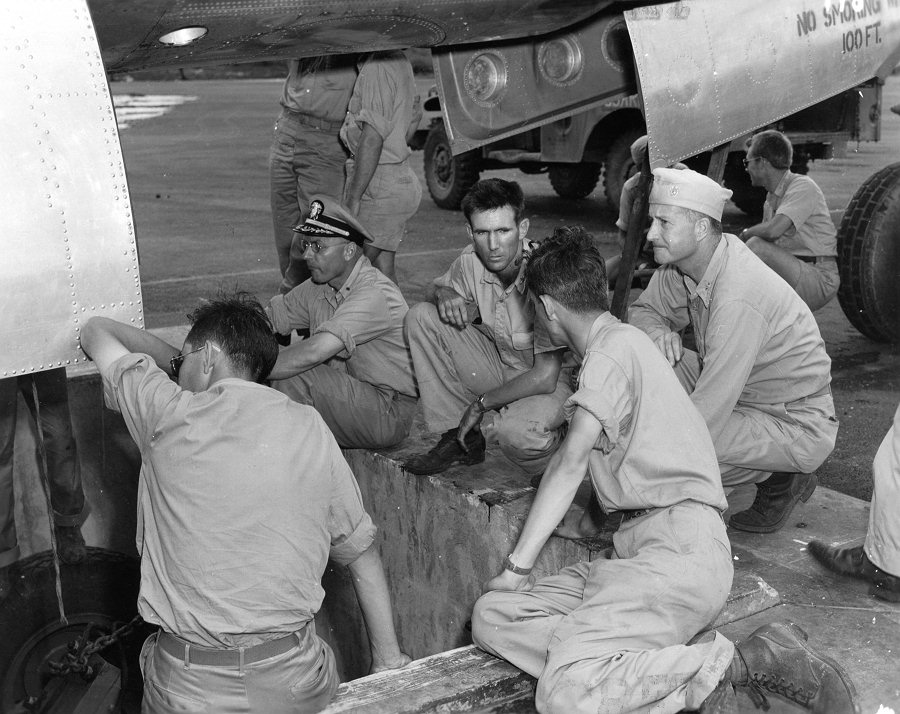
Parsons (right) supervises loading of Little Boy into the bomb bay of Enola Gay

In the space of a week on Tinian, four B-29s crashed and burned on the runway. Parsons became very concerned. If a B-29 crashed with a Little Boy, the fire could cook off the explosive and detonate the weapon, with catastrophic consequences. Consideration was given to evacuating the 20,000 personnel on Tinian from the island, but instead it was decided to load the four cordite powder bags into the gun breech to arm the bomb in flight.

Enola Gay took off at 02:45 (6 August), 7.5 long tons (7.6 t) overweight and near maximum gross weight. Arming of the bomb began eight minutes into the flight and took 25 minutes. Parsons, as the "weaponeer", was in command of the mission. Parsons and his assistant, Second Lieutenant Morris R. Jeppson of the 1st Ordnance Squadron, made their way into the bomb bay of the Enola Gay along the narrow catwalk on the port side. Jeppson held a flashlight while Parsons disconnected the primer wires, removed the breech plug, inserted the powder bags, replaced the breech plug, and reconnected the wires. Before climbing to altitude on approach to the target, Jeppson switched the three safety plugs between the electrical connectors of the internal battery and the firing mechanism from green to red. The bomb was then fully armed. Jeppson monitored its circuits.

Four other members of Project Alberta flew on the Hiroshima mission. Luis Alvarez, Harold Agnew and Lawrence H. Johnston were on the instrument plane The Great Artiste. They dropped "Bangometer" canisters to measure the force of the blast, but this was not used to calculate the yield at the time. Bernard Waldman was the camera operator on the observation aircraft. He was equipped with a special high-speed Fastax movie camera with six seconds of film in order to record the blast. Unfortunately, Waldman forgot to open the camera shutter, and no film was exposed. In addition, some members of the team flew to Iwo Jima in case Enola Gay was forced to land there, but this was not required.

The mission was flown as planned and executed without significant problems. The three target-area aircraft arrived over Iwo Jima approximately three hours into the mission and departed together at 06:07. The safeties on the bomb were removed at 07:30, 90 minutes before time over target, and 15 minutes later the B-29s began a climb to the 30,000-foot (9,100 m) bombing altitude. The bomb run began at 08:12, with the drop three minutes later. Simultaneously The Great Artiste dropped its three Bangometer canisters, after which the B-29s immediately performed steep 155-degree diving turns, The Great Artiste to the left and Enola Gay to the right. The detonation followed 45.5 seconds after the drop. Primary and "echo" shock waves overtook the B-29s a minute following the blast, and the smoke cloud was visible to the crews for 90 minutes, by which time they were almost 400 miles (640 km) away. The only footage of the mushroom cloud was taken by Harold Agnew while Robert "Bob" Caron took the definitive photograph of the cloud from the tail gunner position of the Enola Gay before the bomber returned to Tinian at 14:58.

The three parachute-dropped Pief Panofsky pressure gauges had drifted down above the bomb, and the calibration pulses, radio transmitters, and oscilloscopes indicated everything operated properly. Alvarez noted, "Suddenly a bright flash lit the compartment, the light from the explosions reflecting off the clouds in front of us and back through the tunnel. The pressure pulse registered its N-shaped wave on our screens, and then a second wave recorded the reflection of the pulse from the ground. A few moments later two sharp shocks slammed the pane." The pressure versus time data was later used by Frederick Reines and John Malik to estimate the yield.

=== Nagasaki ===
Purnell, Parsons, Tibbets, Spaatz and Curtis LeMay met on Guam on 7 August, the day after the Hiroshima attack, to discuss what should be done next. Parsons said that Project Alberta would have a Fat Man bomb ready by 11 August, as originally planned, but Tibbets pointed to weather reports indicating poor flying conditions on that day due to a storm, and asked if it could be readied by 9 August. Parsons agreed to do so.

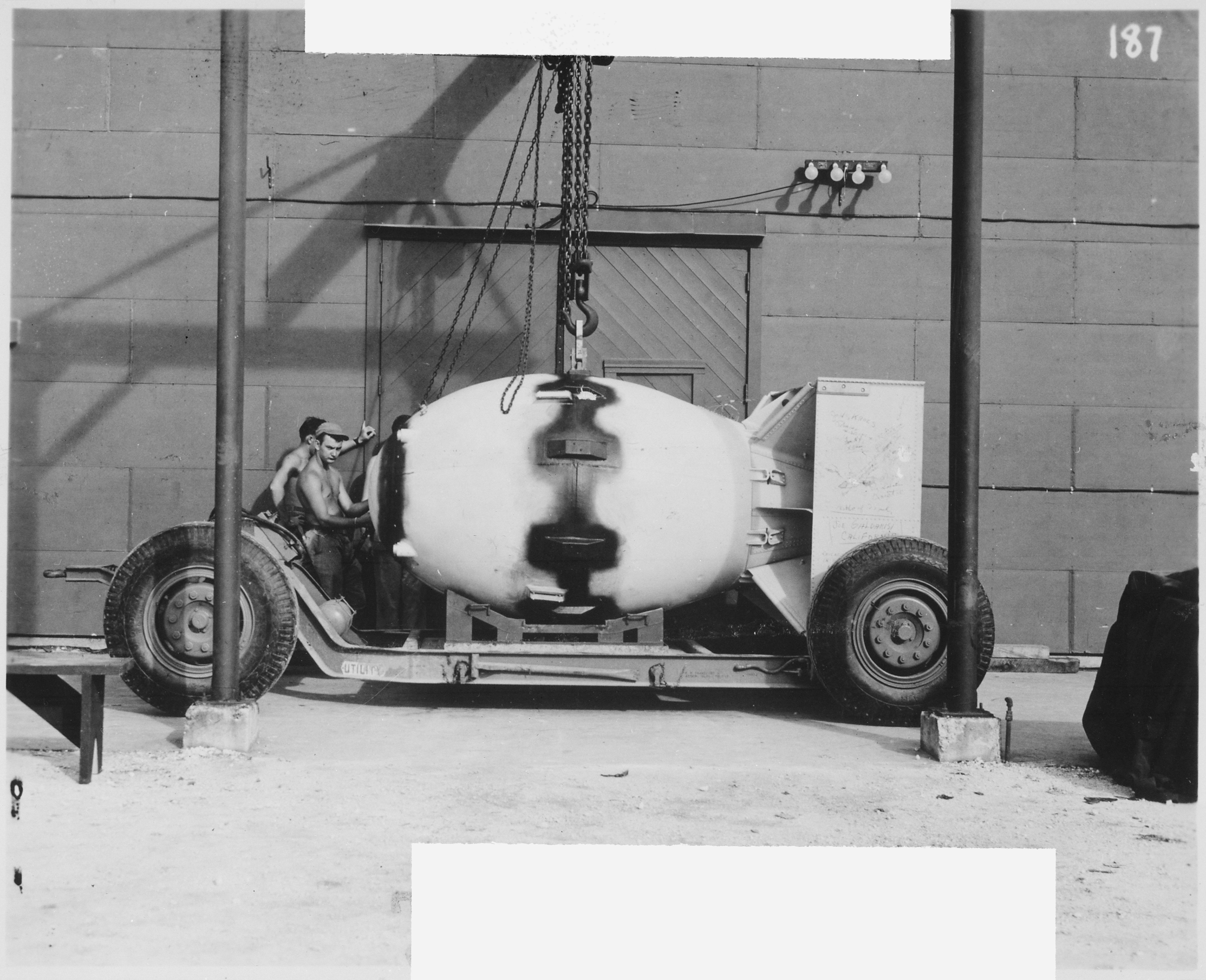
Fat Man unit being placed on trailer cradle in front of Assembly Building#2

For this mission, Ashworth was the weaponeer, with Lieutenant Philip M. Barnes, USN, of the 1st Ordnance Squadron as his assistant weaponeer on the B-29 Bockscar. Project Alberta's Walter Goodman and Lawrence H. Johnston were on board the instrumentation aircraft, The Great Artiste, along with William L. Laurence, a correspondent for The New York Times. Leonard Cheshire and William Penney were on the observation plane Big Stink. Project Alberta's Robert Serber was supposed to be on board but was left behind by the aircraft commander, group operations officer Major James I. Hopkins Jr., because he had forgotten his parachute. Since Serber was the only crew member who knew how to operate the high-speed camera, the whole point of the aircraft's mission, Hopkins had to be instructed by radio from Tinian on its use.

The weather that forced the mission to be advanced by two days also dictated a change in rendezvous to Yakushima, much closer to the target, and an initial cruise altitude of 17,000 feet (5,200 m) instead of 9,300 feet (2,800 m), both of which considerably increased fuel consumption. Pre-flight inspection discovered an inoperative fuel transfer pump in the 625-US-gallon (2,370 L) aft bomb bay fuel tank, but a decision was made to continue anyway. The plutonium bomb did not require arming in flight, but did have its safeties removed 30 minutes after the 03:45 takeoff when Bockscar reached 5,000 feet (1,500 m) of altitude.

It was discovered that the red arming light on the black box connected to Fat Man was lit, indicating that the firing circuit had closed. It took Ashworth and Barnes half an hour to isolate the failed switch that had caused the malfunction and correct the problem. When the daylight rendezvous point was reached at 09:10, the photo plane failed to appear. The weather planes reported both targets within the required visual attack parameters while Bockscar circled Yakushima waiting for the photo plane because Ashworth did not want to proceed without The Great Artiste and under radio silence it was not certain that it was that aircraft that had rendezvoused with them. Finally the mission proceeded without the photo plane, thirty minutes behind schedule.

When Bockscar arrived at Kokura 30 minutes later, cloud cover had increased to 70% of the area, and three bomb runs over the next 50 minutes were fruitless in bombing visually. The commanders decided to reduce power to conserve fuel and divert to Nagasaki, bombing by radar if necessary. The bomb run began at 11:58 (two hours behind schedule) using radar, but the a hole in the clouds enabled Fat Man to be dropped visually at 12:01. The photo plane arrived at Nagasaki in time to complete its mission, and the three aircraft diverted to Okinawa, arriving at 13:00. Trying in vain for 20 minutes to contact the control tower at Yontan Airfield to obtain landing clearance, Bockscar nearly ran out of fuel.

== Later activities ==
Project Alberta still had three test assemblies, F101, F102 and F103, but the damaged F32 was unserviceable, so new explosive blocks would have to be flown in from Project Camel. There were also shortages of some components, notably detonator chimneys. These were fabricated on Tinian. Seven B-29s of the 509th Composite Group flew Pumpkin bomb missions on 14 August. Word that Japan had surrendered reached Tinian the following day.

Farrell organized a mission to assess the damage done at Hiroshima and Nagasaki, which included personnel from Project Alberta, the 1st Technical Service Detachment, and the 509th Composite Group. The remainder of Project Alberta began packing up. The unused F101, F102 and F103 assemblies were packed along with spare components and shipped back to Los Alamos. For security reasons, components not returned to the United States were dumped at sea.

Project Alberta's scientific and technical personnel departed Tinian for the United States on 7 September. Kirkpatrick and Ashworth remained behind to supervise the disposal of Manhattan Project property. Project Alberta was then discontinued. Most of its personnel were transferred to the new Z Division, which began moving to Sandia Base.
