= Lawrence H. Johnston =

American physicist

Lawrence Johnston
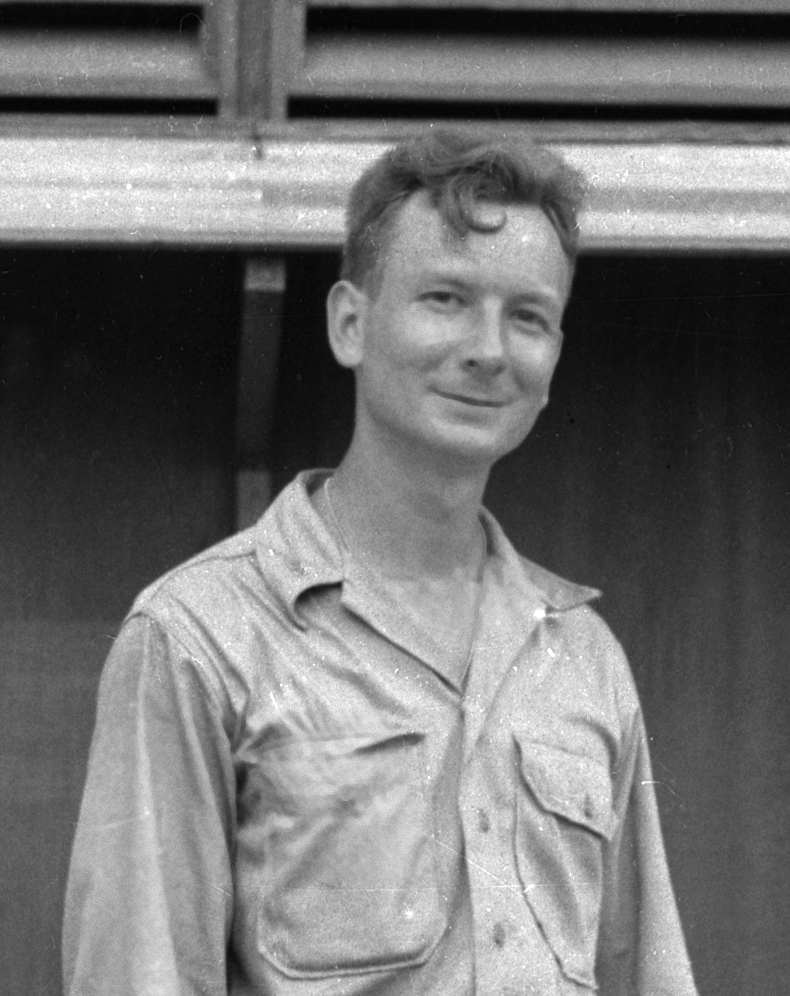
- Johnston on Tinian in 1945
- Born: February 11, 1918; Shandong, China
- Died: December 4, 2011 (aged 93); Moscow, Idaho, United States
- Education: University of California, Berkeley, B.S. 1940, Ph.D. 1950
- Spouse: Mildred (Millie) Hillis Johnston
- Children: 1 son, 4 daughters
- Scientific career
- Fields: Physics
- Workplaces: Los Alamos Laboratory; University of Minnesota; The Aerospace Corporation; Stanford Linear Accelerator Center; University of Idaho
- Doctoral advisor: Luis Walter Alvarez

Lawrence Harding Johnston (February 11, 1918 – December 4, 2011) was an American physicist, a young contributor to the Manhattan Project. He was the only man to witness all three atomic explosions in 1945: the Trinity nuclear test in New Mexico and the atomic bombings of Hiroshima and Nagasaki in Japan.

During World War II, Johnston worked at the MIT Radiation Laboratory where he invented ground-controlled approach radar. In 1944, he went to the Manhattan Project's Los Alamos Laboratory, where he co-invented the exploding-bridgewire detonator.

After the war, Johnston completed his Ph.D. thesis in 1950, and became an associate professor at the University of Minnesota in Minneapolis. He later worked at the Stanford Linear Accelerator Center as head of the electronics department, and was a professor at the University of Idaho in Moscow, where he taught until his retirement.

== Early life ==
Born in Shandong, China, on February 11, 1918, Johnston was the son of American Presbyterian missionaries. The family returned to the United States in 1923, and his father became a Presbyterian pastor in Santa Maria, California.

After graduation from Hollywood High School in 1936, Johnston earned an associate degree at Los Angeles City College. He transferred to the University of California, Berkeley, where Luis Walter Alvarez was a graduate student. Johnston received his bachelor's degree in physics in 1940.

== World War II ==
=== MIT Radiation Laboratory ===
Johnston intended to study for his doctorate under Alvarez, but instead followed him east to the MIT Radiation Laboratory near Boston in February 1941. Alvarez and Johnston worked together on ground-controlled approach radar. This allowed aircraft to be guided to a safe landing in adverse weather conditions, based on radar images, and would later prove crucial during the Berlin Airlift. They were awarded US Patents 2,555,101 and 2,585,855 for it.

While a graduate student at Berkeley, Johnston met Mildred (Millie) Hillis, a girl who shared his strong Christian faith. When Alvarez discovered how much Johnston missed Hillis, he arranged for Johnston to be flown back to Berkeley. Johnston and Hillis married, and returned to Boston together. She sometimes accompanied them on field trips to test the ground-controlled approach radar system. They had five children: Mary Virginia (Ginger), Margy, Dan, Lois, and Karen.

=== Manhattan Project ===
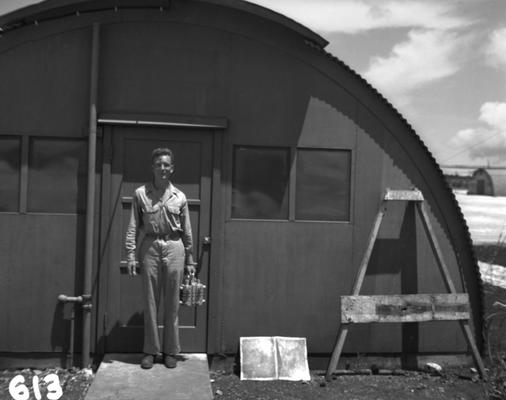
Johnston with the Fat Man plutonium core on Tinian in 1945

At age 26 in 1944, Johnston followed Alvarez to the Manhattan Project's Los Alamos Laboratory, where Robert Oppenheimer, who was also from the University of California, was the director. Johnston became involved in the development of the Fat Man plutonium bomb. Because of the high level of spontaneous fission in reactor plutonium, it was decided to use a nearly critical sphere of the metal and compress it quickly into a much smaller and denser core using explosives, a technical challenge at the time.

To create the symmetrical implosion required to compress the plutonium to the required density, thirty-two explosive charges were simultaneously detonated around the spherical core. Using conventional explosive techniques with blasting caps, progress towards achieving simultaneity to within a small fraction of a microsecond was discouraging. Alvarez directed Johnston to use a large capacitor to deliver a high voltage charge directly to each explosive lens, replacing blasting caps with exploding-bridgewire detonators. This detonated all thirty-two charges within a few tenths of a microsecond. The invention was critical to the success of the implosion-type nuclear weapon. Johnston was awarded US Patent 3,040,660 for the exploding-bridgewire detonator.

Johnston and Alvarez's next task for the Manhattan Project was to develop a set of calibrated microphone/transmitters to be parachuted from an aircraft to measure the strength of the blast wave from the atomic explosion, so as to allow the scientists to calculate the bomb's energy. He observed the Trinity nuclear test from a B-29 Superfortress that also carried fellow Project Alberta members Harold Agnew and Deak Parsons.

Flying in the B-29 Superfortress The Great Artiste in formation with the Enola Gay, Alvarez and Johnston measured the blast effect of the Little Boy bomb which was dropped on Hiroshima. A few days later, again flying in The Great Artiste, Johnston used the same equipment to measure the strength of the Nagasaki explosion. He was the only person to witness the Trinity test and the bombings of both Hiroshima and Nagasaki.

Johnston never regretted the part he had played in the bombings. Years later, Johnston recalled:

Back at Los Alamos there was lots of rejoicing. "We won the War!" But several important people were having pangs of conscience, most notably Oppenheimer. Yes we had stopped the wartime killing, but we had killed a lot of people with our bombs, and worst of all we had let the genie out of the bottle, and now nuclear war would be a specter for the world to face. … Oppie felt especially responsible for this nuclear worry, and he made public statements of remorse. I think it was because of this that Oppie was forgiven by the 1945 Peace Activists in the Physics community. Instead he became their hero. But Alvarez was not forgiven, and he suffered public insults as a warmonger. The same for Ernest Lawrence. The Peace activists sounded like they wished we had lost the war, or at least that it had ended in a bloody stalemate.

== After the war ==
After the war, Johnston returned to graduate school at Berkeley. Under Alvarez's supervision, he wrote his PhD thesis at the Lawrence Berkeley Laboratory on the "Development of the Alvarez-type proton linear accelerator". After he graduated in 1950, he became an associate professor at the University of Minnesota. There, he built a 68 MeV proton linear accelerator, which he used to perform proton-proton scattering experiments. In 1964, he joined the Physics Laboratory of The Aerospace Corporation, where he learned techniques for investigating far infrared radiation.

In 1964, Johnston moved to the Stanford Linear Accelerator Center as head of the Electronics Department. He worked there on the construction of a 2-mile-long (3.2 km), 20 GeV electron linear accelerator. He became a professor of physics at the University of Idaho in 1967, and focused on nuclear physics, far infrared lasers, and molecular spectroscopy. Johnston retired in 1988 at age 70, and continued to reside in Moscow as professor emeritus until his death.

In retirement, Johnston made a number of trips to Israel to work on biblical archaeology projects. He was a strong supporter of Christian ministries, and believed in intelligent design. Johnston died of lung cancer at age 93 in his home in Moscow on December 4, 2011. Married for 69 years, he was survived by his wife Millie and their five children.

== Honors ==
- Phi Beta Kappa, 1939
- Elected Member, Society of the Sigma Xi, 1950
- Elected Fellow, American Physical Society, 1953
- Elected Fellow, American Scientific Affiliation, about 1952
- Sigma Xi award, Outstanding Research Paper of the year, 1976
  - Stark Spectrum of Methyl Alcohol in the Far Infrared with R. P. Srivastava. J. Mol. Spectroscopy 61 147 (1976).

== Bibliography ==
- Alvarez, L. W. (1987). Alvarez: Adventures of a Physicist. Basic Books. ISBN 0-465-00115-7.
