= Goldcrest (disambiguation) =

The goldcrest is a passerine bird in the kinglet family.

Goldcrest may also refer to:

- USS Goldcrest (AM-78), a minesweeper commissioned in 1940
- USS Goldcrest (AM-80), a steel merchant trawler built in 1928
- USS Goldcrest (AMCU-24), a minesweeper laid down in 1944
- Goldcrest Films, a British film production company
- Goldcrest Point, a point of Bird Island, South Georgia
- Goldcrest, a cultivar of Cupressus macrocarpa

== See also ==
- USS Goldcrest, a list of US warships
