= USS Goldcrest =

USS Goldcrest is the name of three U.S. Navy warships:

- USS Goldcrest (AM-78), a minesweeper commissioned in 1940 and renamed Agate
- USS Goldcrest (AM-80), a steel merchant trawler built as Shawmut in 1928 by Bethlehem Shipbuilding Corporation's Fore River Shipyard in Quincy, Massachusetts
- USS Goldcrest (AMCU-24), was laid down 31 August 1944
