= Wat Tyler Cluverius Jr. =

United States Navy admiral (1874–1952)

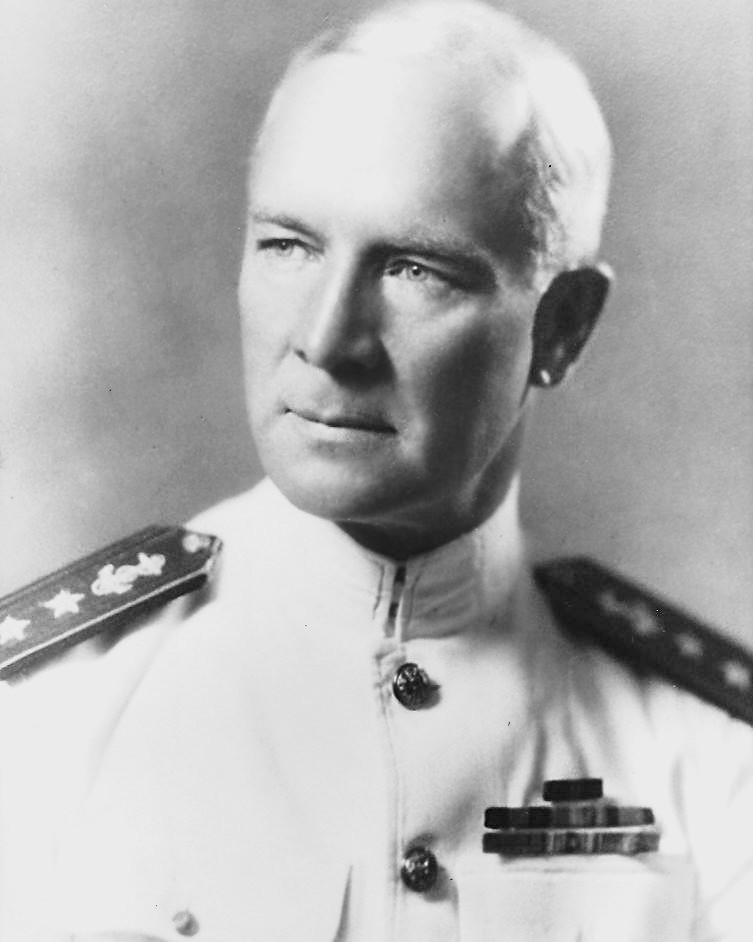
- Rear Admiral Wat Tyler Cluverius Jr.
- Born: 25 December 1874; New Orleans, Louisiana, U.S.
- Died: 28 October 1952 (aged 77); New Haven, Connecticut, U.S.
- Relatives: William Thomas Sampson (father in law); William S. Parsons (son in law); Wat T. Cluverius IV (grandson)
- Military career
- Allegiance: United States of America
- Branch: United States Navy
- Service years: 1896–1939, 1942–1945
- Rank: Rear Admiral
- Commands: Fourth Naval District; Ninth Naval District; USS West Virginia; USS Seattle; USS Baltimore; USS Shawmut; USS Dubuque; USS Sandoval; USS Alvarado; USS Talbot
- Conflicts: Spanish–American War; Philippine–American War; Mexican Revolution; World War I World War II
- Awards: Navy Distinguished Service Medal; Legion of Honor (France); Order of Leopold (Belgium); Order of St. Olav (Norway)

Wat Tyler Cluverius Jr. (12 December 1874 – 28 October 1952) was an admiral in the United States Navy and president of Worcester Polytechnic Institute. When he died, he was the last surviving officer of the sinking of USS Maine.

An 1896 graduate of the United States Naval Academy, Cluverius joined the crew of USS Maine in 1897 and was on board when the ship suffered an explosion in Havana Harbor in 1898. The sinking of Maine helped precipitate the Spanish–American War, a war in which Cluverius participated on a number of ships including USS Scorpion. During the Philippine–American War he served on the USS Solace. In 1914, he took part in the United States occupation of Veracruz, commanding a battalion of bluejackets from the battleship USS North Dakota. During World War I he commanded the minelayer USS Shawmut, laying the anti-submarine mine barrage across the North Sea, for which he was awarded the Navy Distinguished Service Medal.

Cluverius was Commandant of Midshipmen at the Naval Academy from 1919 to 1921, and attended the Naval War College from 1921 to 1922. He was aide to the Secretary of the Navy, Curtis D. Wilbur. Promoted to flag rank in 1928, he was Commandant of the Norfolk Navy Yard from 1928 to 1930, commanded Battleship Division Two the Scouting Fleet from June to November 1930, and was chief of staff to the Commander in Chief United States Fleet. He was commandant of the Ninth Naval District and the Fourth Naval District before retiring from the Navy on 1 January 1939. In retirement, Cluverius became president of Worcester Polytechnic Institute, but returned to active duty during World War II as secretary of the Naval office of Public Information and as a member of the Navy Board of Production Awards. In this capacity he was involved in the conferring of Army-Navy "E" Awards.

== Naval career ==
Wat Tyler Cluverius Jr. was born in New Orleans, Louisiana on 12 December 1874, the son of Wat Tyler Cluverius Sr., and his wife Martha Lewis née Manning. He attended Tulane University before being appointed to the United States Naval Academy at Annapolis, Maryland, which he entered on 20 May 1892.

In those days, naval cadets—the rank of midshipman would not exist for a few more years—by law had to serve for two years before they were eligible to take the examinations for the rank of ensign. Therefore, after graduation from the Naval Academy in June 1896, Cluverius was posted to the cruiser USS Columbia. In 1897 joined the crew of USS Maine. He was on board on 15 February 1898 when the ship suffered an explosion in Havana Harbor. Cluverius made his way out, splashing through water up to waist deep in the darkness, his path obstructed by wreckage. He joined other survivors on deck, and was rescued by SS City of Washington. He was one of only 89 survivors, of whom 18 were officers.

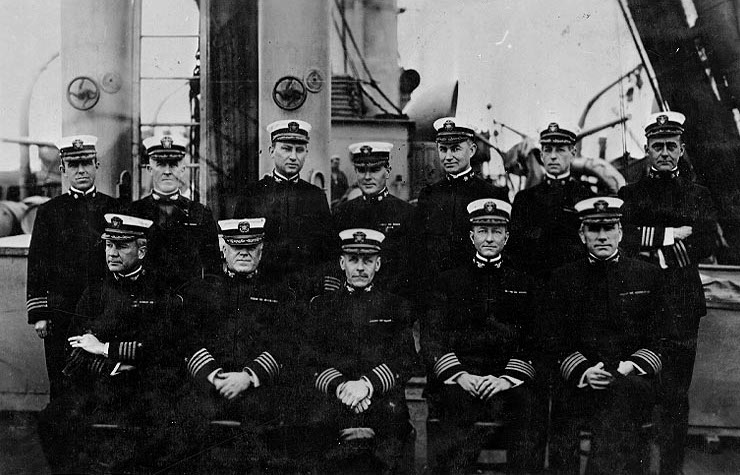
Senior officers of Mine Squadron One, in the North Sea, September 1918. Cluverius is front left.

The loss of Maine helped precipitate the Spanish–American War. Cluverius saw action during the conflict on a number of ships including USS Scorpion, on which he participated in the Second Battle of Manzanillo and the bombardments of Santiago and Aquadores. Commissioned as an ensign, he served in the Philippine–American War on USS Solace in 1900. He then served on the gunboat USS Newport.

In 1899, he became engaged to Hannah Walker Sampson, the daughter of Rear Admiral William T. Sampson. The families knew each other well, and Cluverius was an usher at the wedding of Hannah's sister Olive. On 5 April 1900, they were married in a ceremony at the Boston Navy Yard. Their marriage produced two daughters, Elizabeth (Betty) and Martha, and a son, Wat Tyler Cluverius III. Not only did their son become a naval officer, but both daughters married naval officers, John S. Crenshaw and William Sterling Parsons respectively. Both sons in law later became admirals.

Cluverius served at the Naval Academy on court martial duty and as commander of the torpedo boat USS Talbot. He became commander of the gunboat USS Alvarado in June 1901 and then USS Sandoval in October. He joined the torpedo boat USS Stockton in 1902. The next year he was promoted to lieutenant and was posted to the battleship USS Maine, the namesake of the ship whose sinking he had survived in 1898, as an engineering officer. He was involved with the 1904 sea trials of the cruisers USS Colorado and USS West Virginia before becoming senior engineer of the monitor USS Arkansas. In 1908 he became senior engineer of the newly commissioned USS Mississippi.

Shore duty followed in 1909 as a member of the Naval Examining Board of the Special Service Squadron. For a short time in 1910, Cluverius was navigator of USS Massachusetts, an old battleship now used as a training ship for midshipmen, before becoming Judge Advocate at the Court of Inquiry at the Philadelphia Navy Yard. He attended a conference of officers at the Naval War College in Newport, Rhode Island from May until August 1911, and then became Inspection Officer at the New York Navy Yard.

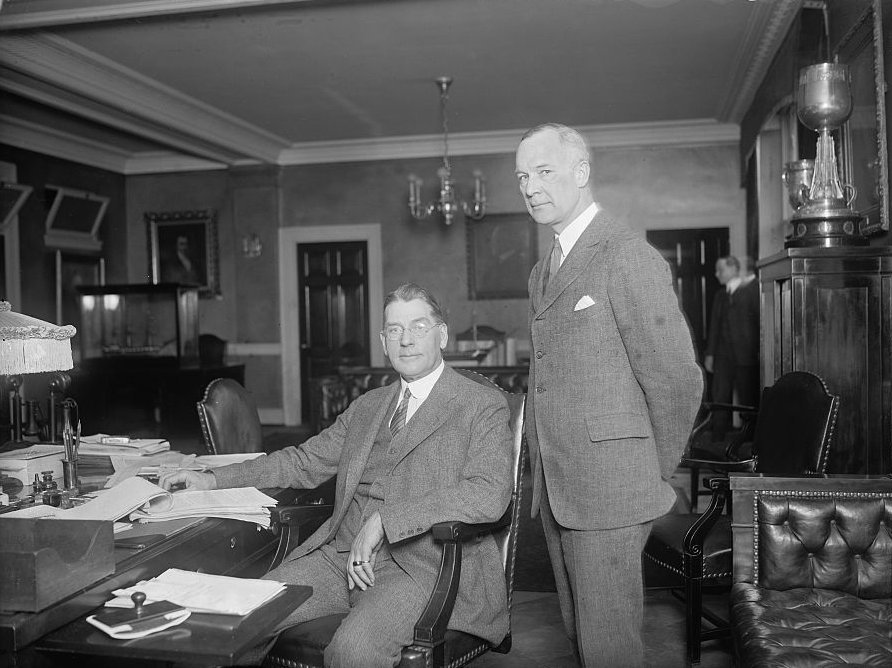
Secretary of the Navy Curtis D. Wilbur and his aide, Captain Wat Tyler Cluverius Jr., 25 February 1926

Cluverius, now a lieutenant commander, was posted to the battleship USS North Dakota in March 1914. From July to October 1914, he took part in the United States occupation of Veracruz, commanding a battalion of bluejackets that was landed from North Dakota. After returning to the ship he became its executive officer until July 1915, when he became commander of USS Dubuque. He was then posted back to the Naval Academy as an engineering instructor.

In November 1917, Cluverius became responsible for the conversion of the steamer SS Massachusetts to a minelayer. The ship was commissioned on 7 December 1917, and renamed USS Shawmut on 7 January 1918. She steamed to Britain in June 1918 and spent the rest of World War I laying the anti-submarine mine barrage across the North Sea. Shawmut laid 2,970 anchored mines before returning to the United States in December 1918. He was awarded the Navy Distinguished Service Medal "for exceptionally meritorious service in a duty of great responsibility as Commanding Officer of the USS Shawmut, engaged in laying mines in the North Sea." He also became an Officer of the French Legion of Honor, and Officer of the Belgian Order of Leopold and a Commander of the Norwegian Order of St. Olav.

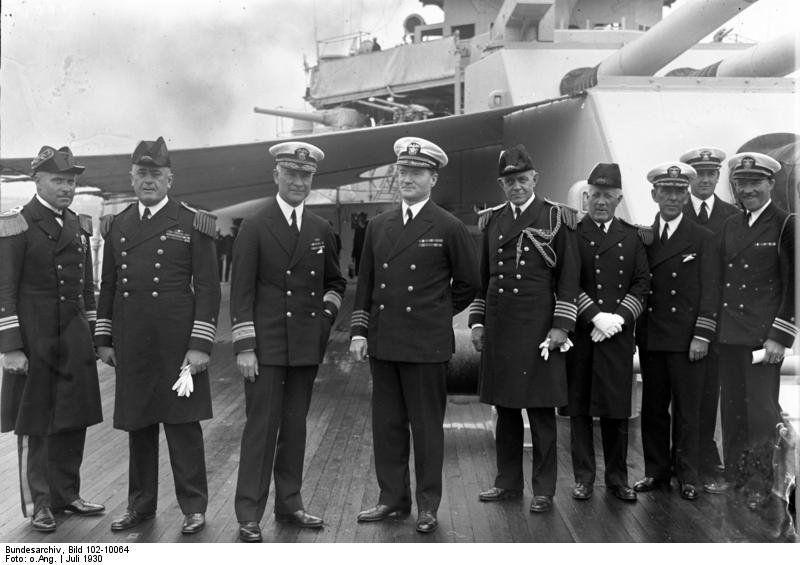
Rear Admiral Cluverius (third from left) with his staff on the deck of his flagship USS Arkansas in Kiel, Germany, 9 July 1930

Cluverius commanded the cruiser USS Baltimore from February until June 1919, when he became Commandant of Midshipmen at the Naval Academy, a post he held until 1921, when he left to attend the Naval War College. After graduating in 1922, he became Chief of Staff of Commander Base Force, Pacific Fleet. He commanded the cruiser USS Seattle from June to December 1923, when, following the usual pattern of sea duty alternating with shore duty, he was posted to the office of the Chief of Naval Operations. He became aide to the Secretary of the Navy, Curtis D. Wilbur.

Sea duty followed in 1926 as captain of the cruiser USS West Virginia. In 1928, he was promoted to rear admiral. He was one of only five captains promoted that year, the others being Arthur Japy Hepburn, Harry E. Yarnell, Albert Ware Marshall and Thomas Tingey Craven. He was Commandant of the Norfolk Navy Yard from 1928 to 1930, and commanded Battleship Division Two (BatDiv2) of the Scouting Fleet from June to November 1930. He then became chief of staff to the Commander in Chief United States Fleet, Admiral Jehu V. Chase, who flew his flag from the battleship USS Texas, the ship on which his son in law Deak Parsons was also serving.

Cluverius was commandant of the Ninth Naval District from 1932 to 1935. As such, he was the US Navy representative at the Century of Progress World's Fair in Chicago from 1933 to 1934. His last sea command was the Base Force, United States Fleet, from 1935 to 1937. In June 1937 he became Commandant Fourth Naval District and Philadelphia Navy Yard, a post he held until his retirement on 1 January 1939. He was decorated with Order of the Crown of Italy for his service in connection with aid for transatlantic flight of Italo Balbo.

== Later life ==
In retirement, Cluverius became president of Worcester Polytechnic Institute, in succession to Rear Admiral Ralph Earle, a Naval Academy classmate who died in February 1939. Cluverius announced that his priority would be to complete the building program envisaged by his predecessor. He began with a footbridge which was named in Earle's memory.

Cluverius returned to active duty during World War II as secretary of the Naval office of Public Information and as a member of the Navy Board of Production Awards. In this capacity he was involved in the conferring of Army-Navy "E" Awards. In 1943, Worcester was chosen as one of the colleges in the V-12 Navy College Training Program. He returned to Worcester in 1945 after the war ended. In 1951, he oversaw the establishment of an ROTC unit on the campus.

On 28 October 1952, Cluverius was returning by train from a Navy reunion in Philadelphia when he became so seriously ill that when the train stopped in New Haven he was taken to hospital, where he died. The last surviving officer of USS Maine, he was buried in Arlington National Cemetery, with his wife Hannah, who died on 20 January 1938. He was survived by his two daughters and his son.

== Decorations ==
Here is the ribbon bar of Rear admiral Wat Tyler Cluverius:

1st Row	Navy Distinguished Service Medal	Spanish Campaign Medal	Sampson Medal
2nd Row	Philippine Campaign Medal	Mexican Service Medal	World War I Victory Medal with Minelayer Clasp
3rd Row	American Campaign Medal	World War II Victory Medal	Officer of the Legion of Honour (France)
4th Row	Officer of the Order of Leopold (Belgium)	Commander of the Order of St. Olav (Norway)	Grand officer of the Order of the Crown of Italy
