= USS Oglala =

US minelayer sunk in 1941 at Pearl Harbor

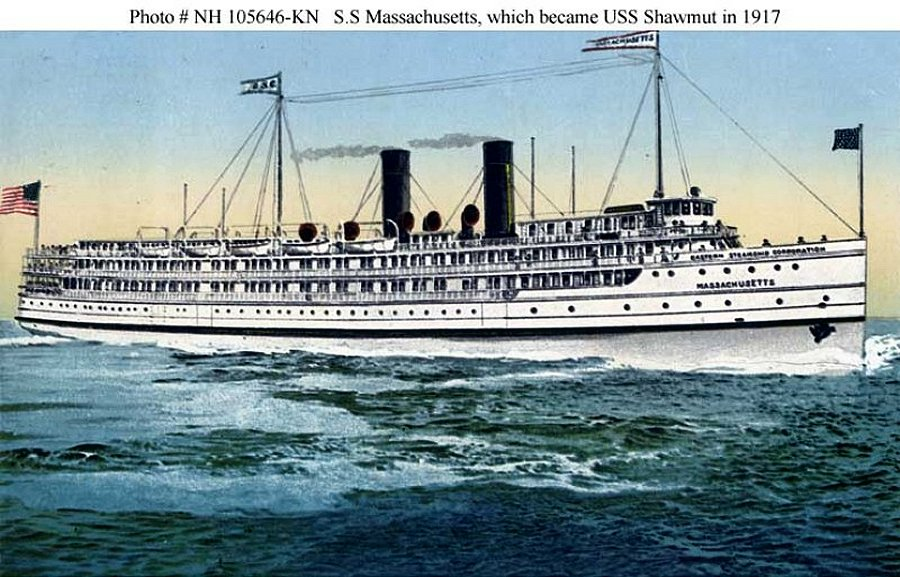
- Massachusetts after she was bought and remodeled by the Eastern Steamship Corporation in 1912.

History

United States
- Name: Massachusetts
- Namesake: Commonwealth of Massachusetts
- Owner: New England Navigation Company (1907–1911); Maine Steamship Company (1911–1912); Eastern Steamship Corporation (1912–1919); Eastern Steamship Lines (1917)
- Port of registry: Boston (1914)
- Ordered: 1907
- Builder: William Cramp & Sons, Philadelphia, Pennsylvania
- Yard number: 342
- Launched: 29 January 1907
- Refit: Converted to passenger service & fuel oil, 1911
- Home port: New London, CT
- Identification: US official number 204012; code letters: KWBM; w/t call sign: KJM (by 1914)
- Fate: Sold to US Navy, 31 October 1917

General characteristics
- Tonnage: 4,029 GRT (1908); 4,779 GRT (1913); 1,724 NRT (1908); 2,575 NRT (1913)
- Length: 375.0 ft (114.3 m) Registered
- Beam: 52.2 ft (15.9 m)
- Depth: 31.6 ft (9.6 m) (1908); 30.2 ft (9.2 m) (1913); 31.6 ft (9.6 m) (1914)
- Decks: 2
- Crew: 60 (1908); 107 (1913)
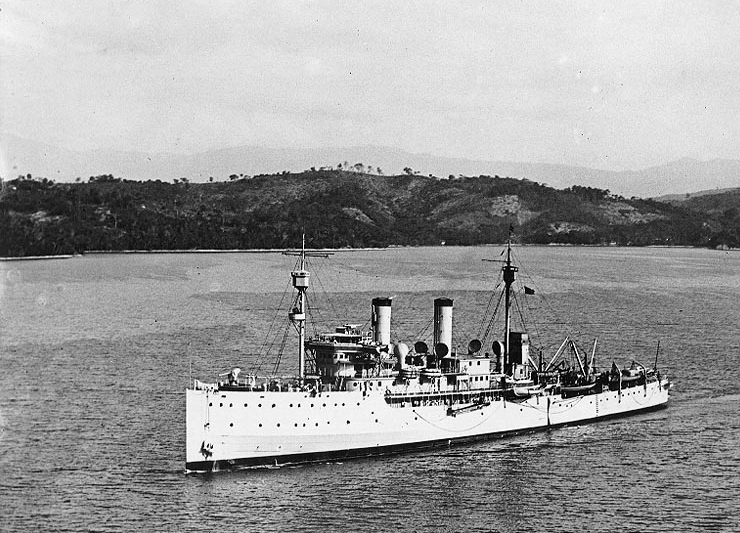
- Operating as USS Shawmut (CM-4) in the Caribbean in April 1924

United States
- Name: Massachusetts (1917–1918); Shawmut (1918–1928); Oglala (1928–1965)
- Namesake: Commonwealth of Massachusetts; Shawmut Peninsula; Oglala Lakota
- Acquired: 31 October 1917
- Commissioned: 7 December 1917; 28 February 1944
- Decommissioned: 11 July 1946
- Renamed: Shawmut, 7 January 1918; Oglala, 1 January 1928
- Reclassified: Minelayer (CM), 1920; Internal Combustion Engine Repair Ship (ARG), 21 May 1943
- Stricken: 12 July 1946
- Identification: Hull symbol: ID-1255; Code letters: GRJL; Hull symbol: CM-4; Code letters: NEPJ; Hull symbol: ARG-1; Code letters: NPXU
- Fate: Transferred to Maritime Commission (MARCOM), 12 July 1946; Transferred to War Shipping Administration (WSA), March 1947; Sold for scrap, November 1965

General characteristics
- Class & type: Aroostook-class minelayer
- Tonnage: 4,779 GRT (1918); 2,575 NRT (1918)
- Displacement: 3,800 long tons (3,900 t) (1918)
- Length: 395 ft (120 m) o.a (1918); 375 ft (114 m) p.p.
- Beam: 52 ft 2 in (15.90 m)
- Draft: 18 ft 6 in (5.64 m); 16 ft (4.9 m) (1921)
- Depth of hold: 31 ft 7 in (9.63 m)
- Installed power: 3 × White-Forster 180 psi (1,200 kPa) saturated steam boilers; 8 × single ended cylindrical boilers (1921); 7,000 ihp (5,200 kW); 337 NHP
- Propulsion: 2 × vertical triple expansion engines; 2 × screws
- Speed: 20 kn (37 km/h)
- Range: 5,000 nmi (9,300 km)
- Capacity: 110 men
- Complement: 407; 425 (1921)
- Armament: 1921; 1 × 3-inch (76 mm)/50 caliber dual-purpose (DP) gun; 2 × machine guns; 1944; 1 × 5-inch (127 mm)/38 caliber DP gun; 4 × 3-in/50 caliber DP guns; 2 × twin 40 mm (1.6 in) Bofors guns

USS Oglala (ID-1255/CM-4/ARG-1) was a minelayer in the United States Navy. Commissioned as Massachusetts, (Note: For other Navy vessels so named, see USS Massachusetts.) she was renamed Shawmut (Note: For other Navy vessels so named, see USS Shawmut.) a month later, and in 1928, was renamed after the Oglala, a sub-tribe of the Lakota, residing in the Black Hills of South Dakota.

Massachusetts was built as a fast cargo vessel for the New England Navigation Company by William Cramp & Sons of Philadelphia in 1907. In 1911 the ship was sold to the Maine Steamship Company and converted to passenger service. The next year Massachusetts was sold to the Eastern Steamship Corporation. The ship then operated in overnight coastal passenger steamer service through the Cape Cod Canal and Long Island Sound between Boston and New York City. After the US entered World War I, Massachusetts and her sister ship Bunker Hill, were among eight civilian steamships purchased to lay the North Sea Mine Barrage.

== Construction ==
Three new ships for the New England Navigation Company, controlled by the New Haven railroad interests, were designed to compete with the Metropolitan Line vessels Yale and Harvard using the outside, offshore passage yet be capable of using the inside passage through sounds. The three vessels were designed by the Quintard Iron Works Company of New York with heavy construction for offshore operation and characteristics necessary for inshore operation. The main deck, with the exception of machinery was designed for 1,500 tons of cargo. The second deck had officers quarters and a few passenger staterooms with more officers quarters on the upper deck. Massachusetts and Bunker Hill had reciprocating engines driving twin screws while the later Old Colony, otherwise identical, was designed with Parsons turbines driving triple screws.

Massachusetts was laid down in 1907, by the William Cramp & Sons Ship & Engine Building Company at Philadelphia, Pennsylvania, as hull number 342, U.S. Official Number 204012 and signal KWBM, for the New England Navigation Company. (Note: DANFS differs with respect to corporate origins; however, contemporary sources, including the U.S. registry, confirm the original owner/operator was New England Navigation Company. Launch dates also differ in other sources, ranging from January to April.) The ship was launched 29 January 1907.

As built propulsion machinery was by two four cylinder, triple expansion engines supplied with steam by eight single ended boilers. The vessel was twin screw with the contract requiring the engines develop 7,000 horsepower. The ship made a trial run on 4 June 1907 between New York and Fall River exceeded requirements for 18 kn (21 mph; 33 km/h) with 720 tons of cargo making the run in 7 hours and 48 minutes with an average speed of 20 kn (23 mph; 37 km/h) with 800 tons of cargo.

The conversion in 1911 changed registered tonnage from 4,029 GRT, 1,724 NRT to 4,779 GRT, 2,575 NRT and depth of hold from 31.6 ft (9.6 m) to 30.2 ft (9.2 m). Registered crew size went from 60 to 107 (Note: See photo of Massachusetts and Bunker Hill during conversion on page 39 of Shipbuilding at Cramp & Sons (reference Farr et al.))

== Commercial service ==
Along with her sister ships, Bunker Hill and Old Colony, Massachusetts provided overnight coastal cargo steamer service through the Cape Cod Canal and Long Island Sound between New York City, Boston, and Portland, Maine.

In 1911, Massachusetts and Bunker Hill returned to the Cramp & Sons shipyard for conversion to passenger service and from coal to fuel oil in 1912 with the ship being sold to the Eastern Steamship Corporation. Financial difficulties forced Eastern Steamship Corporation into receivership in 1914, and it emerged three years later as the Eastern Steamship Lines.

== Service history ==
=== World War I ===
In April 1917, the Allies formulated a plan to lay minefields in the North Sea to counter German U-boat attacks on their shipping in the Atlantic. Known as the North Sea Mine Barrage, or Northern Barrage, these mines laid between Scotland and Norway would, they thought, limit German submarine access to the Atlantic from the North Sea. This plan involved the creation of a new generation of minelayers of which Massachusetts was included.

On 2 November 1917, Massachusetts and Bunker Hill were purchased by the US Navy for $1,350,000 each and sent to the Boston Navy Yard for conversion to minelayers. Sister ship Old Colony was purchased for $1,150,000. Before Massachusetts completed her conversion she was renamed Shawmut after the Shawmut Peninsula on the Charles River that flows through Boston. She was the second ship in the Navy to carry the name and was commissioned as USS Massachusetts (ID 1255) on 7 December 1917, with Captain Wat T. Cluverius in command.

After her extensive conversion from a passenger steamer to a minelayer, Massachusetts was renamed USS Shawmut (ID 1255) on 7 January 1918 and departed the Navy Yard at Boston on 11 June 1918. She completed her sea trials in Presidents Roads, Massachusetts before steaming to Naval Base 17 at Inverness, Scotland, where she anchored on 30 June 1918. The sea trials had revealed that she and Aroostook – the new name for Bunker Hill – consumed fuel at a higher rate than expected, raising concerns that they would be unable to make a non-stop trans-Atlantic voyage. Cluverius and Commander Roscoe Bulmer devised a plan to refuel both ships while underway with hoses from the destroyer tender Black Hawk. Although this technique was uncommon at the time, and was done during a gale, both ships successfully refueled.

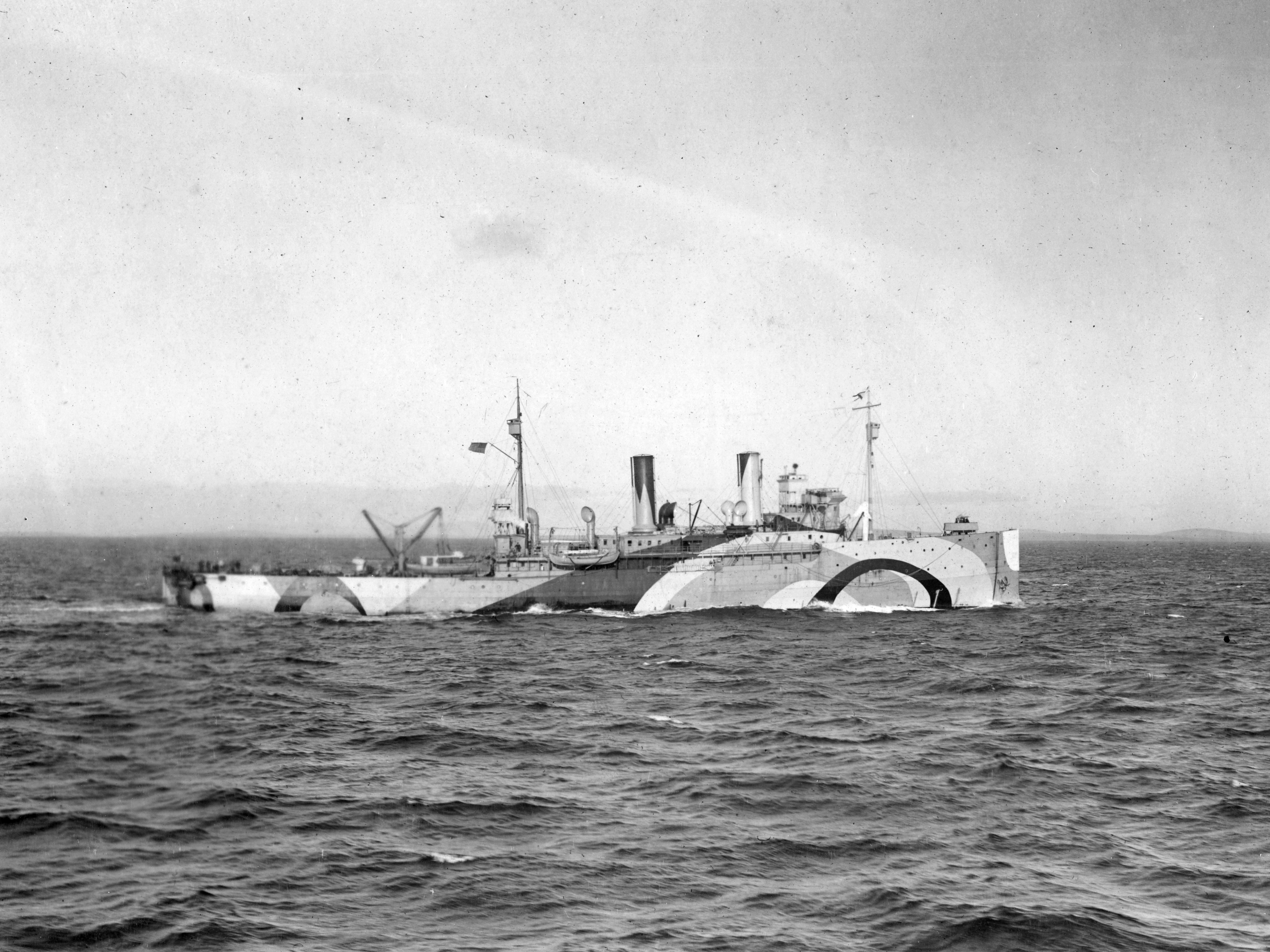
USS Shawmut laying mines in the North Sea, October 1918.

Over the next several months the Mine Force planted mines in the North Sea along with their Allied counterparts. Shawmut took part in ten minelaying excursions, placing 2,970 mines for the barrage.

Hostilities ceased on 11 November 1918. Shawmut then loaded 310 mines and set sail for the US with various other minelayers on 30 November. She reached Hampton Roads Naval Operations Base (NOB), Norfolk, Virginia, on 27 December 1918.

=== Between the wars ===
Shawmut was reassigned to the US Air Department after refitting at Boston Navy Yard to serve as a seaplane tender. The ship carried out the majority of her duties tending the amphibious aircraft off the eastern seaboard of the United States from Key West, Florida, to Narragansett Bay, Rhode Island. Her voyages frequently took her to foreign ports including: Guantánamo Bay, Cuba; Kingston, Jamaica; Samaná Bay, Dominican Republic; and Trujillo, Panama. On 17 July 1920, she was reclassified as CM-4 (Cruiser-Minelayer #4).

In June and July 1921, Shawmut participated in an event that is a major milestone in military aviation history, now known as Project B. The experiences of Brigadier General Billy Mitchell during the war had caused him to become an outspoken advocate for the use of winged aircraft in military operations, which was then a new concept. He argued for the establishment of an independent air force and expanding the use of winged aircraft. His undiplomatic style hindered acceptance by his colleagues, among the beliefs of whom was that aircraft would be ineffective as weapons against contemporary military vessels. Mitchell proved them wrong during a series of bombing exercises in the summer of 1921, in the Hampton Roads, off the coast of Virginia. For a part of these, two US Army photographers from Langley Army Air Field joined Shawmut to document attacks on the captured German U-boat, U-117, that was used as the first target.

After participating in the bombing exercises, Shawmut returned to her routine as an aircraft tender for the rest of summer of 1921. She entered the Philadelphia Navy Yard for an overhaul on 31 October, where she remained until 5 January 1922. She then returned to her primary duties as a minelayer but also continued to provide services to Navy planes. The duties took her back to the Caribbean, as well as operating along the US east coast for battle practice, gunnery and mining exercises.

In early November 1922, after she had finished maintenance and repair at the Philadelphia Navy Yard, Shawmut was ordered to Honduras, to return the body of that country's ambassador to the US, who had died in Washington, D.C. After the state funeral in Amapala, Honduras, she continued with the body for burial at La Libertad, El Salvador. Shawmut then returned to Philadelphia, where she underwent more upkeep and repair between 6 December 1922 – 3 January 1923.

In February 1923, Shawmut served as the radio control ship for the remotely-controlled target ship Coast Battleship No. 4 (ex-Iowa) during Fleet Problem I off the coast of Panama.

Through the next two decades, she served as a seaplane tender and minelayer. To avoid confusion with the similar sounding Chaumont, a hospital ship, the Shawmut was renamed Oglala on 1 January 1928. At about the same time, she was given new boilers and other modifications, changing her appearance from two smokestacks to one. Oglala was flagship of the 1934 Aleutian Islands Survey Expedition.

=== World War II ===
==== Pearl Harbor ====
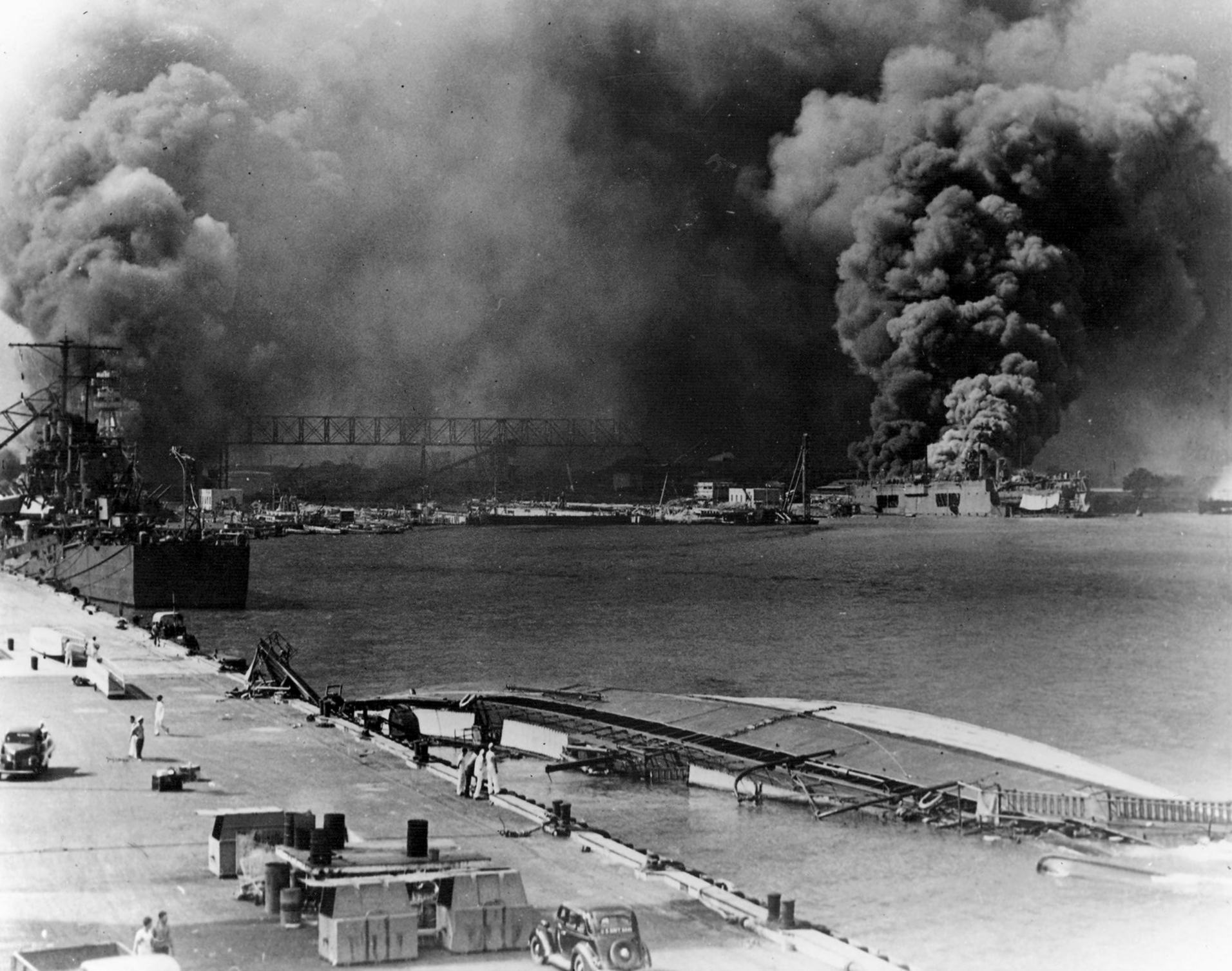
Oglala capsized at Pearl Harbor, USS Helena is on the left.

In 1941, Oglala became the flagship of Rear Admiral William R. Furlong, commander of minecraft for the Battle Force of the Pacific Fleet.

On the morning of 7 December 1941, Oglala lay moored outboard of light cruiser Helena alongside Ten Ten Pier, Pearl Harbor Navy Yard. Around 07:55, her sailors began firing on attacking Japanese aircraft. A Nakajima B5N2 "Kate" carrier torpedo bomber released a torpedo that detonated near her port side in between her and Helena. The blast ruptured her port hull and lifted fireroom floor plates, causing her to immediately take on water as, almost simultaneously, Japanese planes strafed her. Since the ship was receiving power from the dock, the crew was unable to start her pumps to deal with the deluge of water. This damage would later give her a reputation as "the only ship ever to sink from fright."

Approximately five minutes into the attack, a bomb fell into the water between Oglala and her companion cruiser, detonating near her fireroom. She began to list five degrees to port and the rate at which she was flooding meant she would not remain afloat. Commander Roland E. Krause, the executive officer, who was in command at the time, decided to move the ship clear of Helena and secure her directly to the pier. This was achieved by around 09:00, but 30 minutes later her list had increased to twenty degrees and the order was given to abandon ship. Sometime around 10:00, she rolled toward the dock severing her bridge structure and main mast as she settled to the bottom on her port side.

None of the crew of Oglala were killed in the attack, although three received injuries. In his subsequent report, Commander Edmond Pryor Speight, commanding officer of Oglala, commended the entire crew for performing in accord to the “highest tradition of the Navy,” but particularly singled out two sailors. Fireman Second Class Jerald "E" Johnson took decisive action in the immediate aftermath of the attack. Johnson secured the boiler and fireroom, preventing a boiler explosion and curtailing some flooding. Chief Boatswains Mate Anthony Zito was able to quickly get Oglala's 3-inch (76 mm)/50 caliber anti-aircraft gun into action to fire on the approaching Japanese planes. After the order was given to abandon Oglala, Zito commandeered a drifting motor launch and two of his shipmates then sped to give assistance to the ships on Battleship Row.

==== Salvage ====
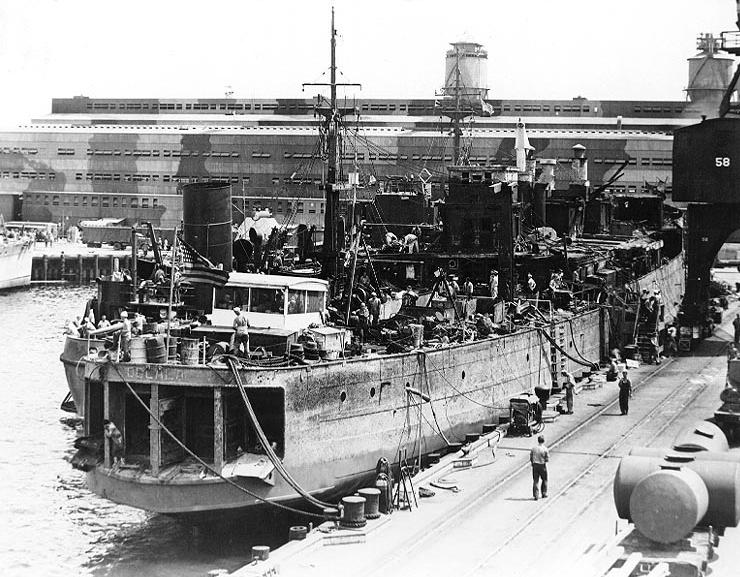
USS Oglala after refloating, 1942.

The effort to salvage Oglala began on 12 December 1941. The first attempt to refloat her by blowing compressed air into her hull was ineffective. Several plans for her future were considered, including floating her enough to drag her ashore, where she would be dismantled. After a re-examination of the situation, a plan was formulated to raise and refit her. By the early spring of 1942, the salvage operation was underway. It was decided that using ten 80 long tons (81 t) submarine salvage pontoons in concert with anchor chains and the aforementioned air bubble technique to right her. The salvage effort was made more complex by Oglala's poor stability. Fifteen to eighteen divers were kept busy for nearly 2,000 underwater hours during the salvage, patching her hull, rigging chains, cutting away unwanted structure and executing many other tasks. After her tophamper had been removed, the salvage pontoons were used to pull the ship upright while air was pumped into her to lighten the load. The parbuckling, or righting attempt, was begun on 11 April 1942, and on 22 April, the crane barge Gaylord, of the Hawaiian Dredging Company, was rigged to Oglala to pull her over, if needed, as she was righted the following day. The operation was a success and Oglala came upright to rest on her bottom.

On 23 June, after six months with her port side beneath the surface, Oglala was floated. The salvage crew was unable to bring her to the draft depth required by the keel blocks in the dry dock, however, and the ship was unsteady. Work began to increase draft and improve her stability but during the night of 25–26 June 1942, the pumps being used to keep her afloat were overwhelmed by an influx of water and she settled to the bottom again. An investigation revealed that the fuel line for the main gasoline powered pump had become clogged overnight, and the electrical back-up pump was not effective because the water level did not rise high enough. While attempting to refloat her again on 29 June, a failure to the cofferdam in aft section caused her once more to settle down. It was determined that, for a second time, the field crew had not built the cofferdam to the proper specifications. After repairs to that, she was floated for a third time on 1 July. A spillage of gasoline on the same day while refuelling caused a fire that was extinguished in 30 minutes, before it could cause any serious damage. When Oglala was finally towed to the dry dock, the bow was the only part of her above the waterline. Once she was settled into the keel blocks, the refitting work began.

==== Conversion to internal combustion engine repair ship ====
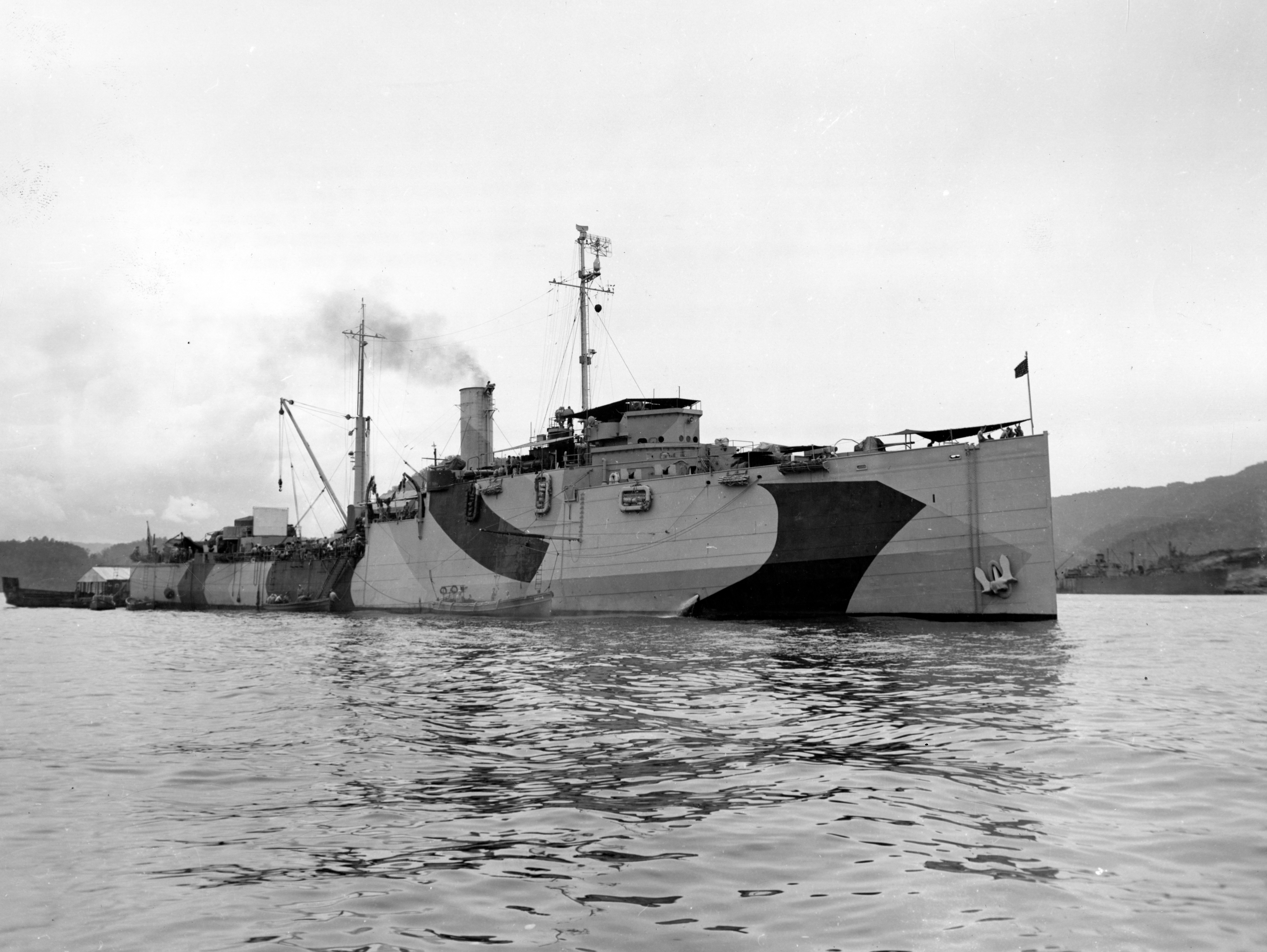
USS Oglala in the Southwest Pacific, 1944

On 23 December 1942, Oglala was seaworthy. She sailed via Mare Island for the shipyard at Terminal Island Naval Dry Docks and was moved into the shipyard itself on 1 March 1943. Reconstruction plans finalized at Mare Island meant that her days as a minelayer came to a close. Her refitting included a complete conversion into an engine repair ship. On 15 June 1943, Oglala was reclassified to an internal combustion engine repair ship ARG-1. While she was undergoing conversion, Oglala remained assigned to Mine Squadron (MinRon) 1 in the Service Squadron (ServRon) within the Pacific Fleet. In November, she received word that her assignment would be shifted to the Seventh Fleet when she completed converting.

Construction delays caused Oglala's conversion to miss the initial completion date of 1 February 1944. She had been scheduled to begin dock trials on 17 February, but the lack of progress by the construction crews caused them to be canceled. On 28 February, she was moved under tow to a berth at the Naval Supply Depot, San Pedro, California, to begin loading the ship's stores and continue the conversion. She began preliminary acceptance dock trials on 2 March. Oglala was accepted into service on 16 March. After completed her sea trials 21–26 March, she reported ready for duty on 30 March and was underway to her new home at Milne Bay, New Guinea, the following day. Oglala reported for duty at Milne Bay on 24 April and began receiving ships alongside for repair work on 29 April.

==== Southwest Pacific service ====
In the wake of Operations Reckless and Persecution in the late spring, May–June 1944, that pushed the Japanese out of Hollandia, New Guinea, Oglala got underway in the early dawn hours of 1 July, to provide repair services at Humboldt Bay, New Guinea. That night, at 22:00, Oglala's radar picked up several small vessels off of her port bow at approximately 3,300 yd (3,000 m). Thirteen minutes later the boats were 200 yd (180 m) off of her port beam. It appeared as if they would pass clear. Suddenly the lead craft made a turn to port and attempted to cross Oglala's bow. Oglala put her rudder hard to port and her engine to full stop in an attempt to avoid a collision. One of the picket boats struck her stern and a mechanized landing craft (LCM) struck the port bow frame. The LCM capsized, dumping her occupants into the sea, and the picket boat sank in approximately one minute. Oglala dispatched her whale boat and trained floodlights on the water to search for survivors. The whaleboat returned with 1st Lieutenant J.T. Barron, USA, of Company B, 533rd Engineer Boats and Shore Regiment, who informed Oglala's commanding officer, Commander Henry K. Bradford, that all of the men were safely pulled from the water. Barron was asleep in the picket boat at the time of the collision and could not provide an explanation as to why it made a sudden course correction. The formation was underway to Milne Bay from Finschhafen, New Guinea. The young officer was provided with new navigation charts having lost his copies when the picket boat sank and sent on his way. Oglala safely arrived at Humboldt Bay on 6 July 1944. She shifted her berth to Imbi Bay at Hollandia the next day.

With more successful Allied campaigns moving the Japanese off of more territory, Oglala was underway once again to provide support. On 14 December, in the waning days of the Battle of Leyte, 17 October–26 December 1944, she was ordered to San Pedro Bay, Leyte, Philippine Islands. Oglala lay at San Pedro Bay, tending various types of small craft, when she received word of the Japanese surrender, on 15 August. She remained in those waters until ordered to return to San Francisco in January 1946.

=== Decommissioning ===
On 9 January 1946, Oglala sailed for the US, via Guiuan and Pearl Harbor. She dropped anchor in San Francisco Bay on 10 February 1946. On 28 March 1946, infantry landing craft began stripping her of material in preparation to join the National Defense Reserve Fleet, Suisun Bay, California. She was decommissioned on 8 July 1946 and removed from the Naval Register on 11 July 1946.

Transferred to the Maritime Commission (MARCOM) on 11 July 1946, Oglala remained with the “mothball fleet,” berthed in the Reserve Fleet at Suisun Bay, for almost two decades. She was sold to Nicolai Joffe Corporation, Beverly Hills, California, on 15 July 1965 and withdrawn from the fleet 2 September 1965 to be broken up for scrap.

== Awards ==
- World War I Victory Medal with "MINELAYER" clasp
- American Defense Service Medal
- American Campaign Medal
- Asiatic-Pacific Campaign Medal with two battle stars
- World War II Victory Medal
- Philippine Liberation Medal

== Notable commanders ==
Half of Oglala's 24 commanders were United States Naval Academy graduates.

Name and rank	Highest rank	dates	notes
Captain Wat Tyler Cluverius, Jr.	Rear Admiral	7 December 1917 – 4 February 1919	Navy Distinguished Service Medal (1918)
Captain Alfred Wilkinson Johnson	Vice Admiral	1 October 1920 – 2 April 1921	Navy Distinguished Service Medal (1917); Legion of Merit (1945)
Captain William D. Leahy	Fleet Admiral	2 April 1921 – 28 June 1923	Navy Cross (1918); 3 × Navy Distinguished Service Medals; Chief of Staff to President Franklin D. Roosevelt (1942–1945)
Commander William S. Pye	Vice Admiral	2 May 1927 – May 1928	Navy Cross (World War I)
