= Shawmut =

Shawmut, according to 19th-century scholarship, is a term derived from the Algonquian word Mashauwomuk referring to the region of present-day Boston, Massachusetts. It appears in a number of present-day placenames.

== Origin of the word ==
It appears in print very early in the history of New England; records from 1630 note that William Blaxton was "dwelling on the other side of Charles River, alone, at a place by the Indians called Shawmutt".

The meaning of Shawmut is uncertain. Most explanations refer to either the salt water surrounding the peninsula, from which come explanations like "canoe landing place" or "place to ferry across", or to the springs of fresh water found within, a major inducement for the settlement of the Massachusetts Bay Colony at that site.

== Examples of the placename ==
This word appears in several place-names, not all of which can be traced with certainty to the Mashauwomuk place name.

- Shawmut Peninsula is the promontory on which Boston is built. Due to land reclamation efforts throughout the 19th century, the peninsula is now over twice its original size.
- Shawmut MBTA station is a subway station on the MBTA Red Line in Dorchester, Massachusetts, that opened in 1928.
- Shawmut Street in Bay Village, Boston.
- Shawmut Avenue in South End, Boston, site of the Goldsmith Block.
- Shawmut Bank was established in Boston in 1836 and its logo, the stylized bust of Sachem Obbatinewat, became widely recognizable in Greater Boston over the next century and a half. In 1988 the bank's parent, Shawmut Corporation, merged with Hartford National Corporation, owner of Connecticut National Bank and the Provident Institution for Savings, to form Shawmut National Corporation. The name and logo were retired in 1995 as a result of the merger of Shawmut National Corporation and Fleet Financial Group.
- Shawmut Capital Partners, an independent, stand-alone venture capital firm formed in 1998 by a former Chairman of Fleet Financial Group, now holds the rights to the Shawmut name and the logo of Chief Obbatinewat.
- Shawmut Aquatic Club is a USA swim club based in the Boston area.
- Shawmut Line was the popular name for the service operated by the Pittsburg, Shawmut and Northern Railroad and its successor, the Pittsburg and Shawmut Railroad. The name may originate in financial backing from the Shawmut Bank in Boston.
- Shawmut, Maine is a village located in the town of Fairfield, Maine. It was so named because the Shawmut Manufacturing Company, which ran a de-barking operation was chiefly financed by the Shawmut Bank of Boston, Massachusetts.
- Shawmut Dam on the Kennebec River on Maine was built by the Shawmut Manufacturing Company in 1914. As there are abandoned railroad tracks nearby, the Shawmut Manufacturing Company may be a link between Shawmut Bank and the other railroad-related uses of the Shawmut name.
- Shawmut, Montana is a small community near Harlowton. It takes its name from a train station, which, in turn, may have taken its name from the surname of a local rancher or may be connected to the railroad interests mentioned above.
- Shawmut Design and Construction is a large national construction management firm with headquarters in Boston and offices in New York City; Providence, Rhode Island; Las Vegas; Los Angeles, California; Miami; West Springfield, Massachusetts; and New Haven, Connecticut. Founded in 1982, the name Shawmut comes from the company's first office which was near the Shawmut MBTA station mentioned above.
- MV Shawmut was a steel commercial trawler, built in Quincy, Massachusetts, in 1938, which later served the U.S Navy as the USS Goldcrest (AM-80) during World War II.
- Shawmut Group is a public affairs and campaign consulting firm based in Boston. It is managed by Eric Fehrnstrom, Beth Myers, and Peter Flaherty.

== See also ==
- Shawmut Motor Company
- USS Shawmut
