= Obbatinewat =

Obbatinewat was a 17th-century Wampanoag sachem who lived in what is now Massachusetts.

Mourt's Relation, written c. 1620 and describing the early days of Plymouth Colony, has the following mention:

The sachem, or governor of this place, is called Obbatinewat, and though he lives in the bottom of the Massachusetts Bay, yet he is under Massasoit. He used us very kindly; he told us, he durst not then remain in any settled place, for fear of the Tarantines. Also the Squaw Sachem, or Massachusetts queen, was an enemy to him. We told him of divers sachems that had acknowledged themselves to be King James his men, and if he also would submit himself, we would be his safeguard from his enemies, which he did, and went along with us to bring us to the Squaw Sachem.

The image of Obbatinewat shown on this page was used as the logo of The National Shawmut Bank of Boston, later known as Shawmut Bank, until 1995 when it merged with Fleet Financial Group. The logo is now used by Shawmut Capital Partners.
