= Shawmut Design and Construction =

American employee-owned construction management company

- Company type: Private company
- Industry: Construction
- Founded: 1982; 44 years ago
- Founder: Jim Ansara
- Headquarters: Boston, United States
- Number of locations: Boston, MA, New York, NY, Providence, RI, Las Vegas, NV, Los Angeles, Worcester, MA, New Haven, CT, and Miami, FL
- Area served: United States
- Key people: Les Hiscoe (CEO)
- Services: General contracting and construction management
- Number of employees: 1075 (2015)
- Website: www.shawmut.com

Shawmut Design and Construction is an American construction management company. The company has 11 offices across the United States and aims to provide a better building experience. The company is employee-owned and works with a large number of top 500 companies in the US.

The company focuses on buildings for academia, commercial, corporate interiors, cultural and historic preservation, healthcare, life sciences, hotels, restaurants, retail, and sports venues.

== History ==
In 1982, Jim Ansara founded Shawmut with a handful of employees. The company specialized in building projects with complex and difficult conditions - the types of projects other general contractors didn’t want - completing them on fast-track schedules. The market responded positively to Shawmut’s approach to the construction process, and the company quickly grew to be one of New England’s most successful start-up companies.

Ansara served as Shawmut’s President/Chief Executive Officer for 18 years before assuming the position of Chairman and passing on the CEO role to Tom Goemaat. Goemaat focused on the development of Shawmut’s staff as well as the protection and proliferation of the company culture.

By 2008, Shawmut was a $900 million company, employing 875 full-time employees.

== Culture ==
Shawmut is a 100% employee-owned company through the company's Employee Stock Ownership Plan (ESOP). Every year, shares of the company are distributed into each employee's ESOP account which serves as a retirement savings vehicle for them.

== See also ==
- Construction
- Shawmut - area in Boston
