= USS Shawmut =

USS Shawmut, named for the shawmut, is the name of more than one ship of the United States Navy:

- USS Shawmut (1863) was an American Civil War gunboat in use 1863–1877.
- Massachusetts was renamed Shawmut (CM-4) in 1917 and was renamed USS Oglala on 1 January 1928; the minelayer was decommissioned in 1946.
- USS Shawmut (CM-11) was the final name of USS Salem (CM-11), a minelayer and net-laying ship during World War II.
