= USS Sandoval (1895) =

Gunboat of the United States Navy

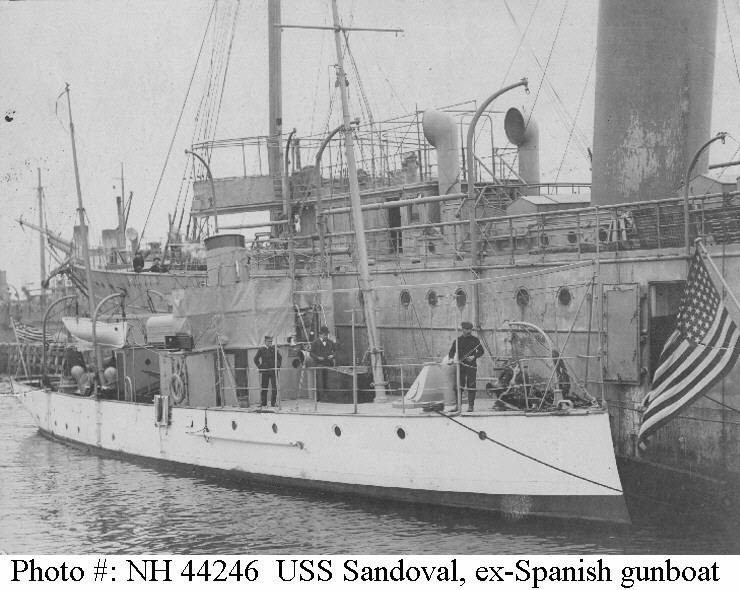
- The ex-Spanish gunboat Sandoval, moored alongside another warship.

History

United States
- Name: Sandoval
- Launched: 20 September 1895
- Commissioned: 2 September 1898
- Decommissioned: 10 May 1899
- In service: 14 October 1900
- Out of service: 1918
- Stricken: 23 July 1919
- Captured: from Spain, 17 July 1898
- Fate: Sold, 30 September 1919

General characteristics
- Type: Gunboat
- Displacement: 106 long tons (108 t)
- Length: 116 ft 10 in (35.61 m)
- Beam: 15 ft 6 in (4.72 m)
- Draft: 6 ft 3 in (1.91 m)
- Speed: 19 kn (22 mph; 35 km/h)
- Complement: 21
- Armament: 2 × 3-pounder (47 mm (1.85 in)) guns; 2 × Colt machine guns

USS Sandoval was an Alvarado-class gunboat acquired by the United States Navy from the Spanish as a prize-of-war. Duties assigned her by the Navy included patrolling coastal and river waterways, and, later, acting as a "practice ship" for the United States Naval Academy at Annapolis, Maryland and for the New York Naval Militia as well.

== Service history ==
The first ship to be named Sandoval by the U.S. Navy, she was a steel gunboat launched on 20 September 1895 at Clydebank Engine and Shipbuilding Co., Clydebank, Scotland, for the Spanish Navy. She was captured on 17 July 1898 upon the surrender of Spanish forces at Santiago de Cuba. Taken in tow by the tug Potomac, Sandoval was berthed alongside Vulcan on 2 September and commissioned the same day. Upon completing preliminary repairs, Sandoval was taken in tow by the tug Manati, and beached near Fisherman's Point, Cuba. There she was careened and her hull cleaned in preparation for the voyage to the United States. Towed off the beach on 1 October, Sandoval ran steam trials on 27 October and departed Santiago Bay on 3 November.

Calling at Key West, Florida, on 9 November, Sandoval sailed on 13 November in company with her sister ship Alvarado for Jacksonville, Florida; Port Royal, South Carolina; Charleston, South Carolina; Wilmington, North Carolina; Hampton Roads, Virginia; and arrived at Norfolk, Virginia, on 24 December. After calling at Annapolis, Maryland, on 29 December, Sandoval reached the Washington Navy Yard on 3 January 1899 for repairs. Standing down the Potomac River on 3 April after overhaul, Sandoval and Alvarado continued northward to New York City; Providence, Rhode Island; Boston, and Marblehead, Massachusetts. Then proceeding to the Portsmouth (N.H.) Navy Yard, Sandoval was decommissioned on 10 May and placed in reserve.

Recommissioned on 14 October 1900, Sandoval was assigned to the United States Naval Academy as a practice ship. Sandoval and her sister, Alvarado, remained at Annapolis until 1906, returning to the Norfolk Navy Yard to decommission on 22 March 1906. Loaned to the New York Naval Militia on 16 November, she arrived in Lake Ontario in September 1907. Commissioning each summer for training duty on the Great Lakes, she was based at Charlotte Harbor, New York, and frequently cruised to Ogdensburg and Sackets Harbor, New York. During World War I, Sandoval continued her training duties on the Great Lakes—calling at ports such as Erie, Pennsylvania and Chicago—into 1918. Declared surplus to Navy requirements, Sandoval was ordered sold on 10 July 1919 and accordingly struck from the Naval Vessel Register on 23 July. She was sold on 30 September to Charles S. Neff of Milwaukee. She was registered until 1924 as a private yacht.
