= USS Goldcrest (AMCU-24) =

Minesweeper of the United States Navy

History

United States
- Name: USS Goldcrest
- Builder: New Jersey Shipbuilding Company, Barber, New Jersey
- Laid down: 31 August 1944, as LCI(L)-869
- Launched: 29 September 1944
- Commissioned: 7 October 1944
- Decommissioned: March 1955
- Reclassified: AMc(U)-24, 7 March 1952; MHC-24, after decommissioning
- Stricken: 1 January 1960
- Identification: IMO number: 5000641
- Fate: Scrapped

General characteristics
- Class & type: LCI(L)-351-class large landing craft
- Displacement: 209 long tons (212 t)
- Length: 159 ft (48 m)
- Beam: 24 ft (7.3 m)
- Draft: 5 ft 8 in (1.73 m)
- Speed: 14 knots (26 km/h; 16 mph)
- Complement: 21
- Armament: 5 × 20 mm AA guns

USS Goldcrest (AMCU-24) was laid down as LCI(L)-869 by the New Jersey Shipbuilding Company, Barber, New Jersey, on 31 August 1944; launched on 29 September 1944; and commissioned on 7 October 1944.

== World War II Transfer to the Pacific Theatre ==
With shakedown in the Chesapeake Bay, the new large infantry landing craft departed Key West, Florida, on 12 November for the Pacific, transited the Panama Canal on the 19th, and arrived San Diego, California, on 1 December. There she joined LCI Group 57, sailed for Hawaii on 29 January 1945, and arrived Pearl Harbor on 7 February.

LCI(L)-869 got underway for the war zone on the 15th, refueled at Johnston Island five days later, and reached the Palaus, via Majuro, Kwajalein, Eniwetok, and Guam, on 7 April. There she joined a picket line which had been formed to seal off by-passed Japanese-held islands in the area from reinforcements and to protect American bases from invasion. While on picket station, LCI(L)-869 repulsed a suicide swimming attack, sank several floating mines which threatened American ships, and heard countless mortar shells whined overhead.

On the afternoon of 2 September, the Japanese forces in the Palaus surrendered.

== Mission complete ==
With her mission accomplished, LCI(L)-869 returned to the United States, decommissioned at Norfolk, Virginia, in March 1947, and entered the Atlantic Reserve Fleet.

The landing craft was renamed USS Goldcrest and redesignated AMc(U)-24 on 7 March 1952. USS Goldcrest was converted to a minehunter at the Charleston Navy Yard, assigned to the 6th Naval District, and operated out of Key West, Florida. She decommissioned at Charleston, South Carolina, in March 1955 and re-entered the Atlantic Reserve Fleet at Charleston, South Carolina. There she was reclassified a coastal minehunter and redesignated MHC-24.

USS Goldcrest was struck from the Navy List on 1 January 1960 and scrapped.
