= USS Alvarado =

Gunboat of the United States Navy

History

United States
- Name: USS Alvarado
- Laid down: date unknown
- Launched: 1895
- Acquired: 17 July 1898
- Commissioned: 4 August 1898
- Decommissioned: 10 May 1999
- In service: 20 September 1900
- Out of service: 1912
- Stricken: 21 May 1912
- Captured: from Spain, 17 July 1898
- Fate: Sold, 10 June 1912

General characteristics
- Type: Gunboat
- Displacement: 106 long tons (108 t)
- Length: 116 ft 10 in (35.61 m)
- Beam: 15 ft 6.75 in (4.7435 m)
- Draft: 6 ft 3 in (1.91 m) (aft) (full load)
- Propulsion: Steam engine
- Speed: 13 kn (15 mph; 24 km/h)
- Complement: 33
- Armament: 1 × 57 mm (2.2 in) gun; 1 × 37 mm (1.5 in) gun

USS Alvarado was a gunboat captured from the Spanish Navy during the Spanish–American War, and then commissioned for use as a United States Navy gunboat. After the war was over, she was again commissioned for use as a training ship for the United States Naval Academy and the Louisiana Naval Militia.

== Service history ==
Alvarado—a gunboat built in 1895 at Clydebank, Scotland, by the Clydebank Engine & Shipbuilding Co. for the Spanish Navy—was captured by the United States Navy at the fall of Santiago de Cuba on 17 July 1898 and was commissioned on 4 August 1898. During the waning days of the Spanish–American War, she patrolled waters around Cuba. On 12 August, the gunboat participated in the bombardment and capture of Manzanillo located on the southeastern coast of the island. Following the end of hostilities, Alvarado continued to cruise between ports of Cuba until November. She began her voyage north on 6 November, and after a number of stops along the East Coast of the United States, arrived at Washington, D.C., on 3 January 1899. She remained at Washington exactly three months before getting underway again on 3 April. The warship operated along the middle Atlantic coast for about a month before arriving at Portsmouth, New Hampshire, on 5 May. Five days later, she was decommissioned and berthed in the navy yard there.

On 20 September 1900, Alvarado was placed back in commission, probably assigned to training duty at the U.S. Naval Academy at Annapolis, Maryland. There is some information to suggest that, about this time, she also cruised the Atlantic coast making port visits for recruiting purposes. In any event, she served as a training platform at Annapolis until 1906. On 22 March 1906, she was decommissioned once more, this time at the Norfolk Navy Yard. On 16 November, she was turned over to the Louisiana Naval Militia for which she served as a training vessel until 1912. She was returned to Navy custody on 21 May 1912, and her name was struck from the Naval Vessel Register simultaneously. On 10 June 1912, she was sold at New Orleans, Louisiana.
