= USS Goldcrest (AM-80) =

Naval trawler

History

United States
- Name: USS Goldcrest
- Builder: Bethlehem Shipbuilding Corp., Quincy, Massachusetts
- Launched: 1938, as MV Shawmut
- Acquired: 29 November 1940
- Commissioned: 15 May 1941
- Decommissioned: 12 December 1945
- Renamed: USS Goldcrest, 12 December 1940
- Fate: Sold to former owner, 20 June 1946

General characteristics
- Type: Naval trawler
- Displacement: 400 long tons (406 t)
- Length: 122 ft 6 in (37.34 m)
- Beam: 23 ft (7.0 m)
- Draft: 11 ft (3.4 m)
- Propulsion: 1 × 600 shp (447 kW) Atlas 6H M3358 diesel engine, no reduction gear, one shaft
- Speed: 11 knots (20 km/h; 13 mph)
- Complement: 36
- Armament: 1 × 3"/50 caliber gun

USS Goldcrest (AM-80), a steel-hulled commercial trawler built as MV Shawmut in 1928 by the Bethlehem Shipbuilding Corp., Quincy, Massachusetts, was acquired by the United States Navy from the Massachusetts Trawling Co. of Boston, Massachusetts, on 29 November 1940, and converted to a minesweeper. The ship was commissioned as a naval trawler at the Boston Navy Yard on 15 May 1941.

== World War II East Coast operations ==
Following shakedown training at Mine Warfare School, Yorktown, Virginia, Goldcrest arrived New York on 10 August 1942 to base at Staten Island while serving as an inshore patrol and NROTC cadet school ship under the 3rd Naval District. On 24 August, she became flagship of Division 1 of the Inshore Patrol Force. In Sandy Hook Bay, New Jersey, while on patrol 11 March 1943, she sank by gunfire three mines that had drifted from defensive minefields. On 29 March, she assisted a damaged merchantman off Staten Island.

Her patrol and school ship duties continued until 5 August 1945 when she transferred to Charleston, South Carolina, for minesweeping duty.

== End-of-War decommissioning ==
Goldcrest was decommissioned on 12 December 1945 and was sold on 20 June 1946 to her former owner.
