= USS Goldcrest (AM-78) =

Minesweeper of the United States Navy

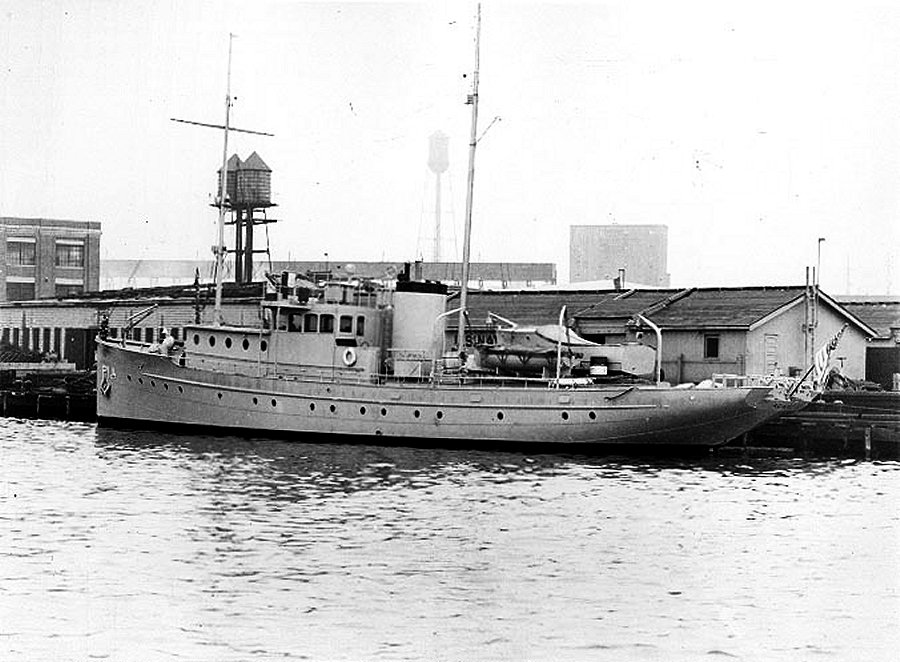

History

United States
- Ordered: as Armina
- Laid down: date unknown
- Launched: 1930
- Acquired: 27 October 1940
- Commissioned: 31 January 1941
- Decommissioned: 29 September 1944
- Stricken: date unknown
- Fate: Disposed of, 3 July 1945

General characteristics
- Displacement: 168 tons
- Length: 110 ft 6 in (33.68 m)
- Beam: 21 ft (6.4 m)
- Speed: 13 knots
- Complement: not known
- Armament: one 3" gun mount

USS Goldcrest (AM-78) was a minesweeper acquired by the U.S. Navy for the dangerous task of removing mines from minefields laid in the water to prevent ships from passing.

== Career ==
Originally classified Agate (AM-78), Agate became PYc-4, 20 December 1940. She was built in 1930 by Mathis Yacht Building Co., (Hull # 209, O.N. 229834) Camden, New Jersey. as Armina (for William W. Atterbury, Pres. Penn R.R.Co.) (later renamed Stella Polaris); acquired by the Navy 27 October 1940 (from then owner, Mr.Livingston Short); and commissioned 31 January 1941.

Throughout most of World War II Agate was assigned to the 15th Naval District where she patrolled the Panama Canal. She departed the Panama Canal Zone 12 August 1944 en route to Philadelphia, Pennsylvania. There she was decommissioned 29 September 1944. She was turned over to the Maritime Commission for disposal 3 July 1945. (Thence sold by the War Shipping Admin. 19 May 1945 to Mr, Vince R. Trabucco, of Steger Il for $14,000.00 as "Stella Polaris", Chicago Il. The wood house was replaced/rebuilt/enlarged at Kingston NY for $75,000.00 and delivered July 1949. Redesigned to sleep 25, including 12 crew. $15,000 to $20,000 furnishings were shipped to Montreal and installed en route Chicago Il. Home-ported Chicago thru summer 1952, transiting the Mississippi to St Petersburg Fl Sept-Oct 1952. Nov 1952, sold to H. R. Davis, who had the owner's quarters enlarged below decks. Eventually sold and renamed Vallarta Alegre, being enlarged/modified as a dinner cruise vessel in Mexico. 2010, extensive upgrades, overhaul, and re-conversion to yacht status in San Diego, Ca.)**
