= Koko Kondo =

Japanese activist and atomic bomb survivor

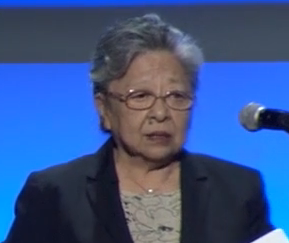
Kondo in 2018

Koko Tanimoto (Née Koko Kondo (近藤紘子, Kondō Kōko), born November 20, 1944) is a prominent atomic bomb survivor, peace activist, and the eldest of at least four children of Kiyoshi Tanimoto, a Methodist minister famous for his work for the Hiroshima Maidens. Both appear in John Hersey's 1946 book Hiroshima.

On May 11, 1955, her immediate family, including 10-year-old Koko and her father, Kiyoshi, unwittingly appeared on a television program popular in the United States at that time, This Is Your Life, where they were placed in the uncomfortable position of meeting with Captain Robert A. Lewis, copilot of the Enola Gay, which dropped the first atomic bomb on Hiroshima. Kondo later recounted that as a child she had come to hate Lewis and thought of him as a monster for what he had done. But when Lewis shook her father's hand on the stage in 1955 she saw a tear on Lewis's face and came to forgive him. "I never heard [of] a monster that had tears. That means he's not a monster. That means he's the same as me. We're human beings."

She lived and studied in Washington, D.C. for five-and-a-half years, graduating from American University in 1969.

Kondo has espoused global peace in such places as Iraq, and speaks frequently at American University. Kondo regularly accompanies both Japanese and international students, mostly Americans, from her alma mater, on a peace study tour throughout Japan focusing on the atomic bomb.

When she was living in the United States, she lived with Nobel Prize winner Pearl S. Buck, who greatly influenced her personal work with Japanese orphans.

Kondo received an honorary degree from Webster University in 2014.

In 2025, she said she was collaborating with Cannon Hersey, the grandson of John Hersey, on a film about Hiroshima.

== See also ==
- List of peace activists
- Peace education
- Religion and peacebuilding
- World peace
