= American University Nuclear Studies Institute =

American research institute

Coordinates: 38.937055°N 77.086922°W

The Nuclear Studies Institute was founded in 1995 at American University in Washington, D.C. as a component of the American University College of Arts and Sciences. The purpose of the Institute is to educate American University graduate and undergraduate students, as well as the general public, about the key points of nuclear history, nuclear culture in the United States, and the threats still posed by nuclear weapons in the modern world.

Under the direction of Dr. Peter Kuznick, the Institute runs during the University summer session, offering on-campus classes dealing with American nuclear culture and also a two-week study trip to Japan. In Japan, American University students, along with other American and Canadian students, travel and study alongside Japanese students, mainly from Ritsumeikan University as well as other universities in Japan and the region. The study tours the cities of Kyoto, Hiroshima, and Nagasaki, where the students hear lectures, visit landmarks, and attend the memorial ceremonies for the atomic bombings of Hiroshima and Nagasaki, as well as their respective peace museums, in an effort to foster closer ties on both sides of the Pacific.

The 2010 Nuclear Studies Institute trip to Japan was covered by NHK, Japan's national broadcasting corporation, and broadcast on Japanese television and featured on the NHK program “Japan Seven Days.”

The Institute provides participants to hear many stories of the hibakusha (被爆者, literally “explosion-affected people"), including those of Koko Kondo, peace activist, American University graduate, and daughter of Reverend Kiyoshi Tanimoto, who figures heavily in John Hersey’s Hiroshima. Tadatoshi Akiba, mayor of Hiroshima and president of the Mayors for Peace organization, also regularly meets with the participants during their study in Hiroshima.

The Institute participates in the Nuclear Education Project; a worldwide effort to improve access to teaching and learning materials regarding the history of the nuclear arms race and the ongoing movement to curb the proliferation of nuclear weapons. The Nuclear Education Project was founded in 2004 by Dr. Peter Kuznick, Mayor Tadatoshi Akiba, Dr. John W. Dower of MIT and Dr. Mark Selden.

== Staff ==
- Peter J Kuznick, Director
- Kana Kobayashi, Outreach Liaison

== See also ==
- American University
- Article 9 of the Japanese Constitution
- Campaign for Nuclear Disarmament
- Comprehensive Test Ban Treaty
- Nuclear arms race
- Nuclear-free zone
- Nuclear Non-Proliferation Treaty
- Nuclear proliferation
- Nuclear warfare
- Nuclear weapon
