= Shigeko =

- Gender: Female

Origin
- Origin: Japanese
- Meaning: Different meanings depending on the kanji used

Other names
- Alternative spelling: 重子

Shigeko (written: 成子, 滋子 or 繁子) is a feminine Japanese given name. Notable people with the name include:

- Shigeko Higashikuni (東久邇 成子; 1925–1961), Japanese princess
- Shigeko Kawanishi (川西 繁子; born 1948), Japanese swimmer
- Shigeko Kubota (久保田 成子; born 1937), Japanese artist
- Shigeko Sasamori (笹森 恵子; 1932–2024), Japanese peace and anti-nuclear activist
- Shigeko Uchida (内田 滋子), Japanese manga artist known by the pen-name Shungicu Uchida
- Uryū Shigeko (瓜生 繁子; 1862–1928), Japanese educator
