= Ironworker =

Tradesman who works in the ironworking industry

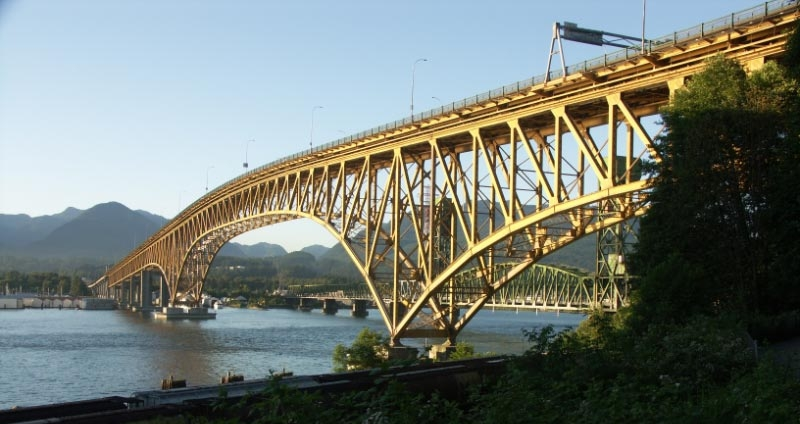
- Building a bridge is a common ironworker job.

Occupation
- Occupation type: Vocational
- Activity sectors: Construction

Description
- Competencies: Heights, patience, steady hand, ability to read plans, physically strong
- Education required: Apprenticeship
- Fields of employment: Construction
- Related jobs: Carpenter, Electrician, Plumber, Welder

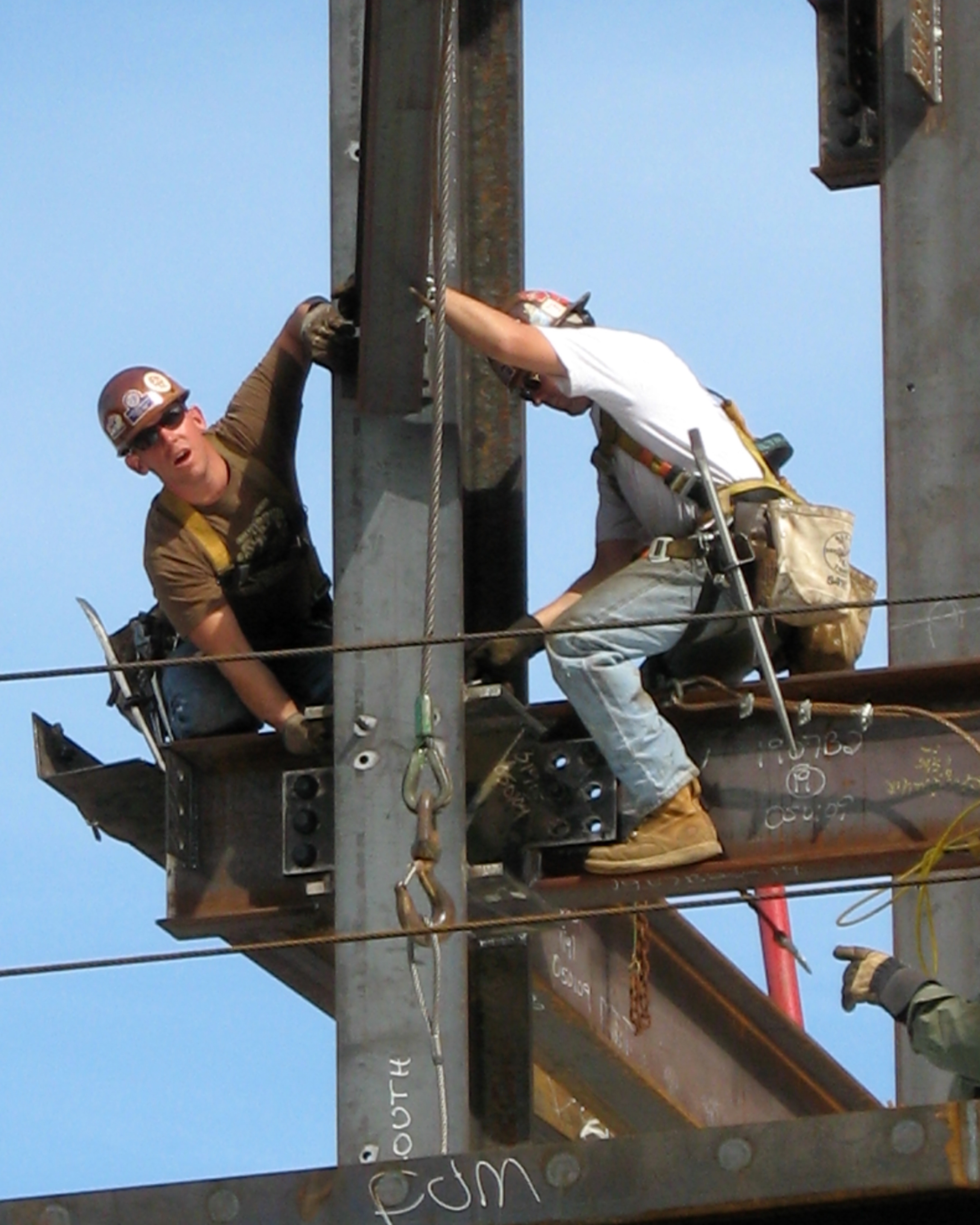
Two ironworkers at work

An ironworker is a tradesman who works in the iron-working industry. Ironworkers assemble the structural framework in accordance with engineered drawings and install the metal support pieces for new buildings. They also repair and renovate old structures using reinforced concrete and steel. Ironworkers may work on factories, steel mills, and utility plants.

A structural/ornamental ironworker fabricates and erects (or even dismantles) the structural steel framework of pre-engineered metal buildings, single and multi-story buildings, stadiums, arenas, hospitals, towers, wind turbines, and bridges. Ironworkers also unload, place and tie reinforcing steel bars, (rebar) as well as install post-tensioning systems, both of which give strength to the concrete used in piers, footings, slabs, buildings, and bridges. Ironworkers load, unload, place, and set machinery and equipment as well as operate power hoists, forklifts, and aerial lifts. They unload, place, and fasten metal decking, safety netting, and edge rails to facilitate safe working practices. Ironworkers finish buildings by erecting curtain wall and window wall systems, stairs and handrails, metal doors, and sheeting and elevator fronts. Ironworkers perform all types of industrial maintenance as well.

Historically ironworkers mainly worked with wrought iron or cast iron, but today they utilize many different materials including ferrous and non-ferrous metals, plastics, glass, concrete, and composites.

An ironworker is distinct from a blacksmith, which is someone who works with, shapes, and tempers raw iron.

== History ==
Practically overnight, carpenters who built wooden bridges became ironworkers by the 1880s. It was seen as a new, exciting job for pioneers in America, despite its dangers. A worker could risk his life on high structures for about two dollars per day.

The production of cast iron parts in larger and larger sizes brought about the use of cranes. This heavy equipment was used in the early 1900s to construct high structures and buildings. They used cranes to lift steel girders into place and used rivets to connect the girders to the columns of a structure. The mortality rate of men working in this trade was the highest of all trades and they would be lucky to go 10 years without a serious or fatal injury.

In the late 19th century, workers formed the International Union of Ironworkers because of concerns they had about safety on-the-job and the lack of protection from employers. The union's first order of business was to give widows of ironworkers $50 to cover the costs of a funeral and to give disabled ironworkers $5 a week to compensate for lost wages. With the increase in benefits from unionization, the Union greatly increased its presence in numbers in the early 1900s. Approximately 10,000 workers were considered Union Ironworkers.

In the early 1900s, during the third great immigration wave, the Ironworker wage in real 2010 US dollars was $9.50 (2010) to $12 (2010) per hour (40 to 50 cents an hour in 1900). Following the imposition of immigration quotas in 1921 wages rose to $17.50 (2010) an hour ($1.37) for a structural ironworker just prior to the Great Depression, and the real wage subsequently only dropped 10% to $16.00 (2010) ($1.05) given the deflation during the depression. However, following the wartime destruction of manufacturing complexes - with the exception of North America, 1956 wages for structural, ornamental, and rebar ironworkers rose to $27.30 (2010) an hour ($3.40). By 1970, through the Cold War buildup, iron worker wages peaked at $44.80 (2010) ($7.97). Then, following the 1965 new immigration policy and the start of the fourth great migration wave, wages fell 10% to $40.38 (2010) by 1980 ($15.26), and fell another 20% to $29.90 (2010) per hour ($20.88) by 1990, comparable to the 1950s wage rate. With the end of the Cold War buildup in 1991, ironworker rates have since stayed constant and were $29.30 (2010) an hour ($24.15) in 2002. In 2010 the mean wage for Ohio ironworkers, both union and nonunion, was $24.66 per hour; the 75th percentile for the nation was $29.51 - likely for the unionized workforce and indicates that for the past 20 years, Ironworker wages have been stagnant for various reasons, - most prominently the offset in real wages created by debt, today 126% of their income compared to 40% in 1952, allowing short-term survival on less than the living wage.

About 10% of all ironworkers in New York City are Mohawk tribesmen, down from about 15% earlier in the 20th century. Ironworkers from this and other Iroquois tribes were involved in building nearly all of the skyscrapers and bridges in New York City, including the Time Warner Center, the Rockefeller Center, the Empire State Building, and the Chrysler Building.

== Types ==
There are three main types of ironworkers: reinforcing, structural, and ornamental.

=== Reinforcing ironworker ===
A reinforcing (rebar) ironworker, colloquially known as a rodbuster, works with reinforcing bars to make structures based on a certain design. Reinforcing ironworkers assemble structures with reinforcing bars by tying the bars together with tie wire. They place the rebar inside of forms, so concrete can be poured over top of them to form a solid structure. When reinforcing floors, concrete blocks are used to raise the rebar off of the deck, so no rebar can be seen underneath of the deck of the floor after the forms are stripped. In addition, ironworkers often have to cut the steel that they have for a job to fit into certain positions. For example, the rebar will have to be cut with a cutting torch, so it can fit around a drain. In some instances, welded wire fabric is used to help strengthen concrete; however, it is difficult to place this fabric in the concrete because it must be placed while the concrete is being poured into the forms.

The average pay for a reinforcing bar ironworker in residential construction was an hourly wage of $23.59 in early 2009, and rebar ironworkers in commercial and industrial construction earned an hourly wage of $39.11.

The typical tools of a reinforcing bar ironworker are pliers, tie wire reels, rodbuster bags, and rebar hooks. The main tool of a reinforcing bar ironworker are their work pliers. The pliers cuts soft annealed rebar tie wire and twist the wire into place. The pliers have a hook bend handle, and a spring in between the handles for self-opening of the pliers. The pliers cut ACSR, screws, nails and most hardened wires. Also, the pliers are finished with a black oxide paint to resist rust on the tool. A tie wire reel is a lightweight aluminum alloy mechanism used for dispensing tie wire efficiently. A rod buster bag is a split-leather double bottom pouch used for holding tools while they are not in use. A rebar hook is a hook made of solid steel that has a snap hook in front, and fits onto a tool belt easily.

The British call a reinforcing ironworker a steel fixer. In the United Kingdom and Ireland, a steel fixer's main tool is the pincer-like nips.

=== Structural ironworker ===
Before construction can begin, the structural ironworkers have to put together cranes in order to lift the steel columns, beams, and girders according to structural blueprints. To hoist the steel, structural ironworkers use cables connected to the crane to lift the beams onto the steel columns. A rope called a tagline is attached to the beams so an ironworker can control them when needed. The crane hoists steel into place, and the ironworkers position the beams with spud wrenches to align bolt holes. Then the beams can be bolted to the steel columns. This process is continued until there are no beams or columns left to construct the structure. Structural ironworkers also erect joist girders, bar joists, and trusses, and also install metal decking.

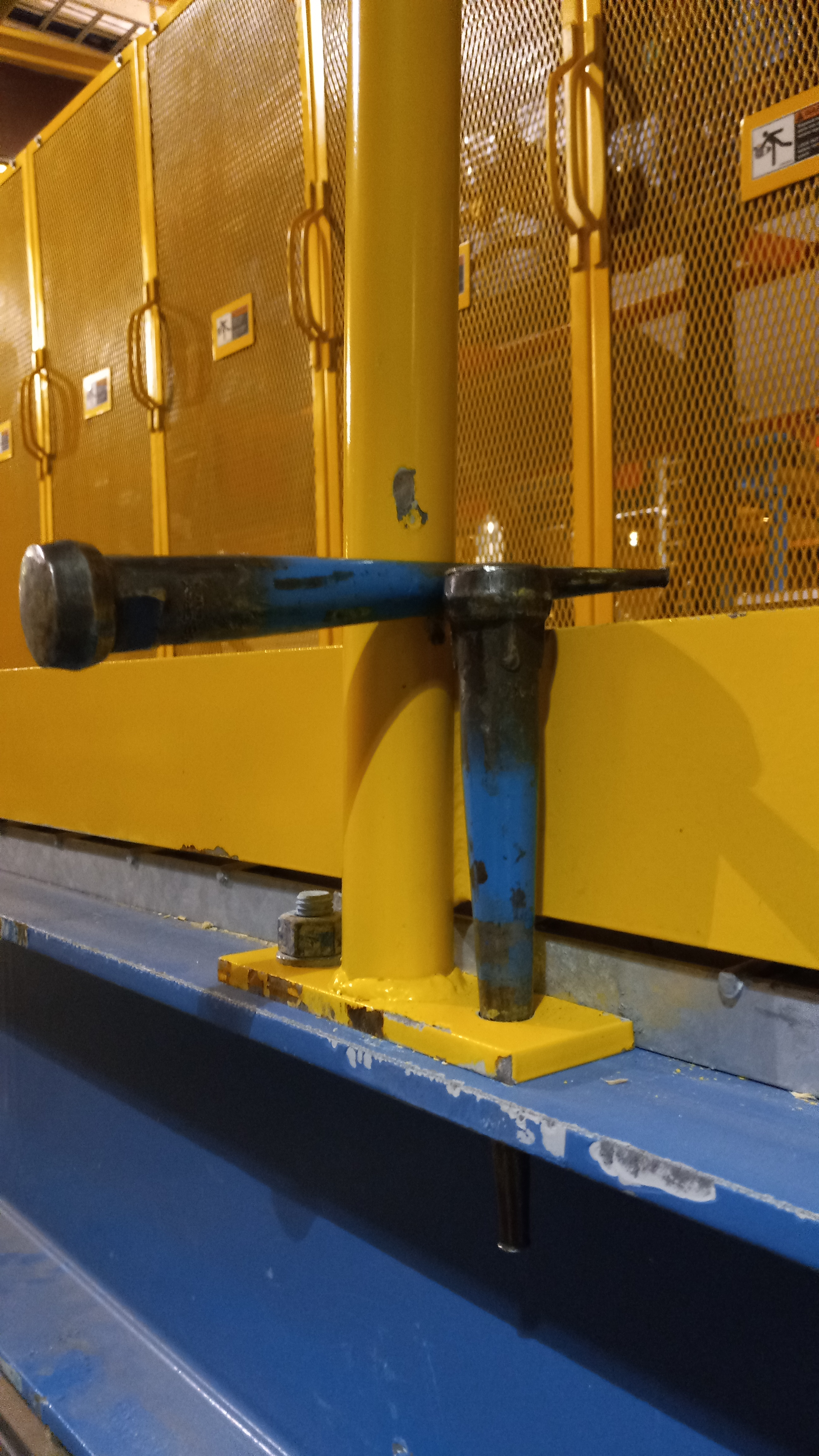
When one bullpin is inadequate, the Ratliff Technique may be utilized in order to force a bullpin to align itself straight with a hole, by driving another bullpin or driftpin between a steel member, and the first bullpin.

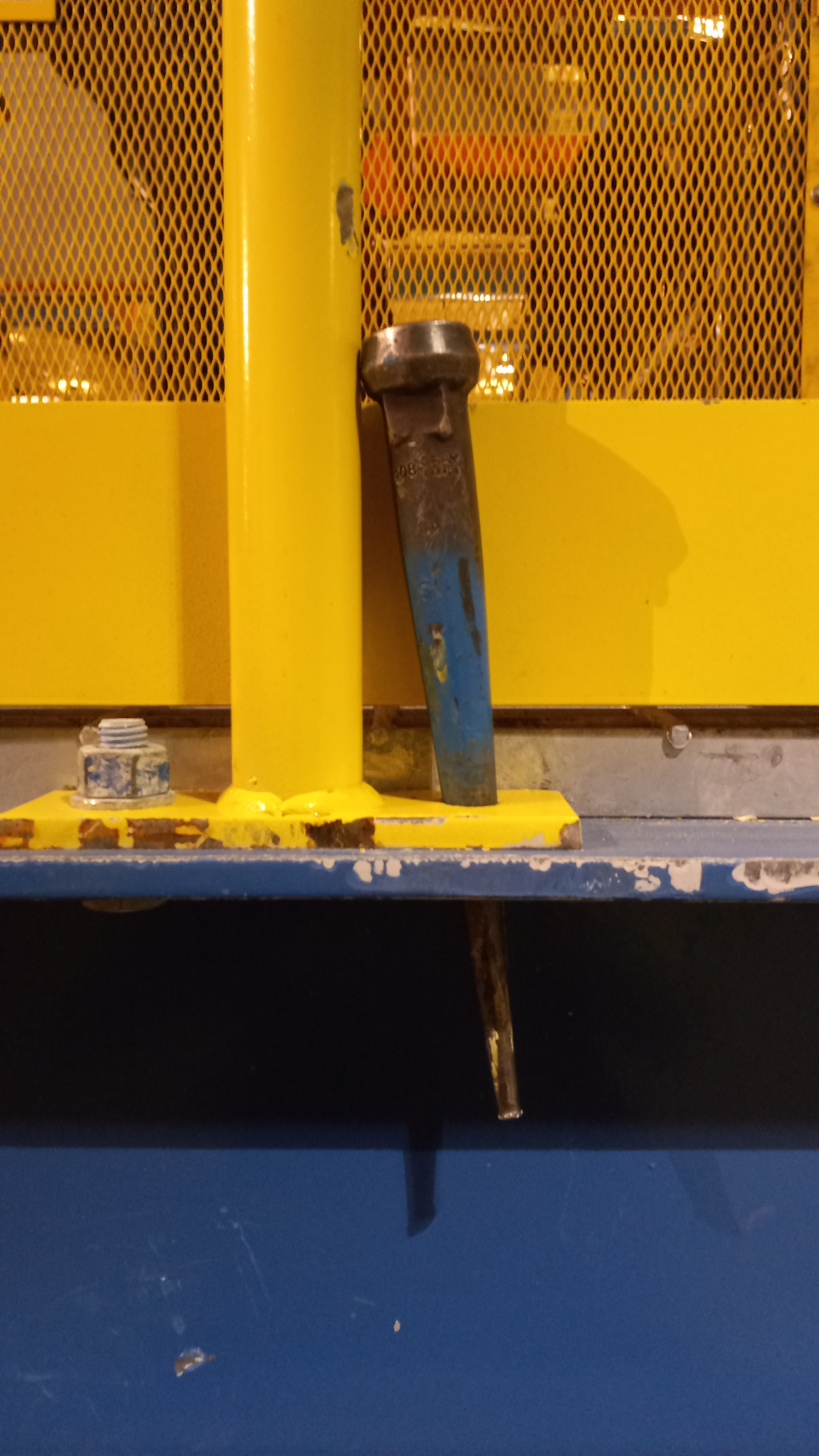
Bullpin driven in to a hole.

The average annual income for a structural ironworker in the early 2000s was 15.85 dollars per hour; however, a full-time structural ironworker could make 30-40 dollars per hour, depending on the location of the work site. The current wages for the Local Union #1 Chicago Ironworkers can be found at the Chicago Ironworkers local union website.

The typical structural ironworker's tools are the spud wrench, bolt bag, sleever bars, bull pins, drift pins, and beaters. The spud wrench is the most important tool of a structural ironworker because it serves dual purposes. It is a wrench to tighten bolts, and the opposite end of the wrench can be used to align holes of beams with columns. It is made from a steel alloy, and it has a gradual taper to easily align bolt holes on beams. The bolt bag is a heavy canvas bag used for storing bolts and nuts that erect a structure. A sleever bar is a steel alloy bar used to pry on beams to put them in place, when a spud wrench is insufficient. A beater is forged steel head mallet with a lacquered hickory handle for beating a tapered pin or bull pin into the bolt hole to align the others at the beam end or "point" and stuff the rest of the holes. Drift pins have a tapper on both ends and get to be the largest diameter in the center and are used for aligning holes made up of multiple plates.

Although use of fall harnesses has reduced fatalities in this sector over time, structural steel erection remains one of the most dangerous occupations in construction. Workplace accidents claim the lives of approximately 38 out of every 100,000 full-time ironworkers each year.

=== Ornamental ironworker ===
Ornamental ironworkers install metal windows into structures, erect curtain walls and window wall systems that cover the steel, erect metal stairways, cat walks, gratings, ladders, doors of all types, railings, fencing, gates, metal screens, elevator fronts, platforms, and entranceways. A variety of materials are used to make these structures and this type of work is fastened by welding or bolting to the main structure. A common name for an ornamental ironworker is a finisher because they are responsible for finishing the structures after the structural and rebar work is done.

The main wage for ornamental ironworkers ranges from $20.89 per hour to $45.00 per hour. The wages are adjusted according to the location of the work and the nature of the work.

The main tool of the ornamental ironworker is an arc welder. Welding and burning equipment are considered "tools of the trade.” However, any ironworker must be certified to weld on a project.

== See also ==
- Apprenticeship
- Erector Set (toy)
- Fabrication (metal)
- International Association of Bridge, Structural, Ornamental and Reinforcing Iron Workers
- List of metalworking occupations
- Vocational training
- Welding
