= The Untold History of the United States =

- Genre: Television documentary
- Created by: Oliver Stone
- Written by: Oliver Stone; Peter Kuznick; Matt Graham
- Directed by: Oliver Stone
- Narrated by: Oliver Stone
- Composers: Budd Carr; Craig Armstrong
- Country of origin: United States
- Original language: English
- No. of episodes: 12

Production
- Executive producers: Oliver Stone; Tara Tremaine; Rob Wilson
- Producers: Carlos Guillermo; Chris Hanley; José Ibáñez; Serge Lobo; Fernando Sulichin
- Editors: Michael Klaumann; Alex Márquez
- Production company: Ixtlan Productions

Original release
- Network: Showtime
- Release: November 12, 2012 – October 15, 2013

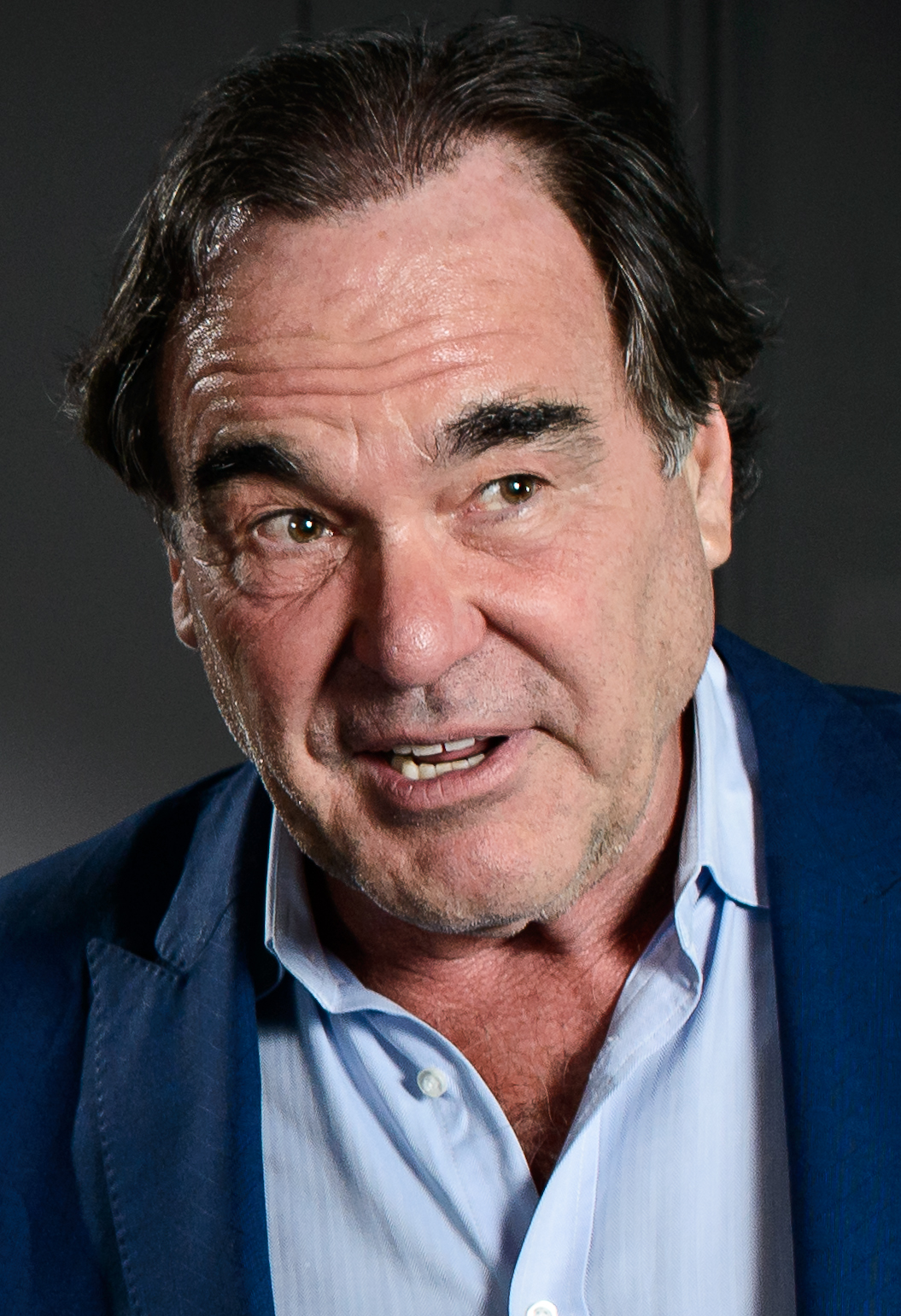
Oliver Stone, 2013

The Untold History of the United States (also known as Oliver Stone's Untold History of the United States) is a 2012 documentary television series created, directed, produced, and narrated by Oliver Stone about the reasons behind the Cold War, the decision to drop atomic bombs on Japan, and changes in America's global role since the fall of Communism.

== Production and release ==
Oliver Stone and historian Peter Kuznick (director of American University's Nuclear Studies Institute) began working on the project in 2008. Stone, Kuznick and British screenwriter Matt Graham co-wrote the script. The documentary miniseries for Showtime had a working title Oliver Stone's Secret History of America. Kuznick objected to the working title "Secret History", claiming that "the truth is that many of our 'secrets' have been hidden on the front page of The New York Times. If people think the secrets will be deep, dark conspiracies, they'll be disappointed. We'll be drawing on the best recent scholarship". It was subsequently retitled The Untold History of the United States.

The series covers "the reasons behind the Cold War with the Soviet Union, U.S. President Harry Truman's decision to drop atomic bombs on Japan, and changes in America's global role since the fall of Communism." Stone is the director and narrator of ten regular episodes and two prologue episodes. The series is a reexamination of some of the underreported and darkest parts of American modern history, using little-known documents and newly uncovered archival material. The series looks beyond official versions of events to the deeper causes and implications and explores how events from the past still have resonant themes for the present day. Stone said, "From the outset I've looked at this project as a legacy to my children and a way to understand the times I've lived through. I hope it can contribute to a more global insight into our American history."

The first three episodes of the series premiered at the New York Film Festival on October 6, 2012, with Indiewire describing them as "extremely compelling" and "daring." The series was personally presented by Stone at the Subversive Festival on May 4, 2013, in Zagreb, Croatia, which next to film screenings also included debates and public lectures by prominent intellectuals such as Slavoj Žižek and Tariq Ali.

Stone described the project as "the most ambitious thing I've ever done. Certainly in documentary form, and perhaps in fiction, feature form." Production took four years to complete. Stone confessed, "It was supposed to take two years, but it's way over schedule". The premiere was finally set for November 12, 2012. Stone spent $1 million of his own money on the film as the budget inflated from $3 million to $5 million.

Regarding the program's accuracy, Stone told TV host Tavis Smiley: "This has been fact checked by corporate fact checkers, by our own fact checkers, and fact checkers [hired] by Showtime. It's been thoroughly vetted... these are facts, our interpretation may be different than orthodox, but it definitely holds up."

The series premiered on Showtime in November 2012. The executive producers were Oliver Stone, Tara Tremaine and Rob Wilson.

The Untold History of the United States was released on Blu-ray on October 15, 2013. All ten episodes of the show are featured on four discs, and the Blu-ray release also includes various bonus content, as well as two prologue episodes. The first prologue episode deals with World War I, the Russian Revolution and Woodrow Wilson. The second prologue episode highlights the pre-World War II era of Franklin D. Roosevelt, Adolf Hitler and Joseph Stalin. The series was released on DVD on March 4, 2014.

== Companion book ==
The ten-part series is supplemented by a 750-page companion book, The Untold History of the United States, also written by Stone and Kuznick, released on October 30, 2012 by Simon & Schuster.

== Audiobook ==
The audiobook was released by Brilliance Publishing on June 4, 2013. The Untold History of the United States audiobook was also written by Stone and Kuznick, narrated by Peter Berkrot. It runs 36 hours and 25 minutes.

== Style and format ==
The series has been said to be reminiscent of the famed British Thames Television series The World at War (1973–74). With the exception of an on-camera introduction and conclusion by Oliver Stone, the series contains no interview subjects. Instead, each episode consists of archival material: stock film, photographs, video and audio recordings, computer generated maps and diagrams, clips from fictional movies, and Stone's voiceover narration. Historical quotations and writings from various figures are read by voice actors.

== Usage of movies and TV shows ==
Oliver Stone used clips from about 60 fictional movies and TV shows over the course of The Untold History of the United States. He used them as a vehicle for telling stories of specific topics during given episodes.

== Critical reception ==
In 2012, The Guardian journalist Glenn Greenwald highly recommended the series and book, describing it as "riveting", "provocative" and "worthwhile".

Former Soviet President Mikhail Gorbachev wrote approvingly of the book:

Oliver Stone and Peter Kuznick provide a critical overview of US foreign policy during the past few decades. ... Such a perspective is indispensable at a time when decisions are being taken that will shape America's role in the global world of the twenty-first century. At stake is whether the United States will choose to be the policeman of a "Pax Americana", which is a recipe for disaster, or partner with other nations on the way to a safer, more just and sustainable future.

David Wiegand wrote for the San Francisco Chronicle: "The films are at their best when they provide a panoramic view of our history in the middle part of the 20th century. Ably abetted by the superb editing work by Alex Marquez". Verne Gay for Newsday similarly praised the craft: "By far the most interesting part of 'Untold' is the visual presentation. Stone has cobbled together a mother lode of chestnuts, including grainy newsreel footage and Soviet propaganda films. It's all weirdly engrossing" but found the content less than provocative: "You keep waiting for a fresh insight, a new twist, a bizarre fact and after a while would even be profoundly grateful for some wacky Stone revisionism. It never comes. What's 'untold' here?"

In November 2012, historian Ronald Radosh of the conservative Hudson Institute lambasted it as "mendacious" Cold War revisionism and "mindless recycling of Stalin's propaganda," claiming similarities to Communist author and NKVD agent Carl Marzani's Soviet-published treatise We Can Be Friends. Radosh wrote:

Over and over, Stone uses the same quotations, the same arrangements of material, and the same arguments as Marzani. This is not to accuse Stone of plagiarism, only to point out that the case he now offers as new was argued in exactly the same terms by an American Communist and Soviet agent in 1952.

Journalist Michael C. Moynihan criticized the book for "moral equivalence between the policies of the psychotically brutal Soviet Union and the frequently flawed policy of the United States" and called the title "misleading" in that nothing within the book was "untold" previously. Moynihan also claimed factual errors and questionable sources.

In 2013, Princeton University history professor Sean Wilentz also remarked that the book and films "have a misleading title" and that "Most if not all of the interpretations that they present... have appeared in revisionist histories of American foreign policy written over the last fifty years". Wilentz went on to say:

Although the book by Stone and Kuznick is heavily footnoted, the sourcing...recalls nothing so much as Dick Cheney’s cherry-picking of intelligence, particularly about the origins and early years of the cold war. ... This book is less a work of history than a skewed political document.

== Untold History Education Project ==
In October 2013, Stone and Kuznick launched the Untold History Education Project to expand upon the narratives and events discussed in the Untold History documentary series and book. The project is devoted to fostering critical thinking and debate amongst students and teachers in high schools and universities. With the input of educators and historians, Stone and Kuznick also designed a curriculum guide for the series and primary source-based lesson plans for each episode.

== Episodes ==
Prequels (only on Blu-ray & DVD)

- Episode A: 1900-1920 – World War I, The Russian Revolution & Woodrow Wilson
- Episode B: 1920-1940 – Roosevelt, Hitler, Stalin: The Battle of Ideas
- Episode C: – On History: Tariq Ali and Oliver Stone in Conversation

Season 1

- Chapter 1: World War II
  - This chapter delves into the history of World War II, with a focus on the often-overlooked events that played a key role in the war's outcome. The Spanish Civil War, Roosevelt's desire to join the allies, Japan's strategic decisions leading up to Pearl Harbor, and the Soviet Union's contribution to the war effort are all explored in detail.
- Chapter 2: Roosevelt, Truman & Wallace
  - In this chapter, we examine the aftermath of World War II, including Stalin's attempts to exert control over Poland and Eastern Europe, the Democratic party's efforts to remove Henry Wallace from the presidential ticket in 1944, and Britain's attempts to maintain its colonial holdings.
- Chapter 3: The Bomb
  - Chapter three centers around the conclusion of World War II, with a particular focus on the events leading up to the use of atomic bombs and Japan's subsequent surrender. This chapter explores the Truman era of American history, with special attention given to the overlooked role of Henry A. Wallace.
- Chapter 4: The Cold War: 1945-1950
  - The origins of the Cold War are analyzed in this chapter, with a month-by-month breakdown of the initial aggressors. The chapter also covers Winston Churchill's famous "Iron Curtain" speech, the rise of the "Red Scare" in the US, and Joseph McCarthy's controversial anti-Communist crusade.
- Chapter 5: The '50s: Eisenhower, the Bomb & The Third World
  - Eisenhower and the CIA are the main focus of this chapter, with an examination of their role in shaping the global political landscape of the 1950s. The chapter delves into the development of the Cold War and the US's battle against communism.
- Chapter 6: JFK: To the Brink
  - Chapter six focuses on JFK's presidency, including the Bay of Pigs invasion and the Cuban Missile Crisis. The chapter also explores early US involvement in Vietnam and JFK's attempts at peace with Khrushchev, as well as the assassination of JFK.
- Chapter 7: Johnson, Nixon & Vietnam: Reversal of Fortune
  - The Vietnam War is the central theme of this chapter, with a focus on the public's disillusionment with modern military power in the face of guerrilla-style warfare. Richard Nixon's administration is also examined, with a particular focus on its methods and their impact on American politics.
- Chapter 8: Reagan, Gorbachev & Third World: Rise of the Right
  - This chapter explores the relationship between Mikhail Gorbachev and Ronald Reagan, which led to new attempts at peace as the Berlin Wall came down. However, the chapter also covers the Iranian hostage crisis, which heightened fears and uncertainty around the world.
- Chapter 9: Bush & Clinton: American Triumphalism – New World Order
  - In this chapter, we examine the US invasion of Panama and its failed attempt at establishing peace in the aftermath of the Cold War. The chapter also explores the George W. Bush administration's approach to security, which ultimately led to a new era of "endless war" in Iraq and Afghanistan.
- Chapter 10: Bush & Obama: Age of Terror
  - The final chapter of the book centers around homeland security and the worldwide global security state. It also covers the economic struggles facing the US, as well as the presidency of Barack Obama and the future of the American Empire.

== See also ==
- Noam Chomsky
- Howard Zinn's A People's History of the United States
