= Shigeko Sasamori =

Japanese anti-nuclear activist (1932–2024)

- 笹森恵子
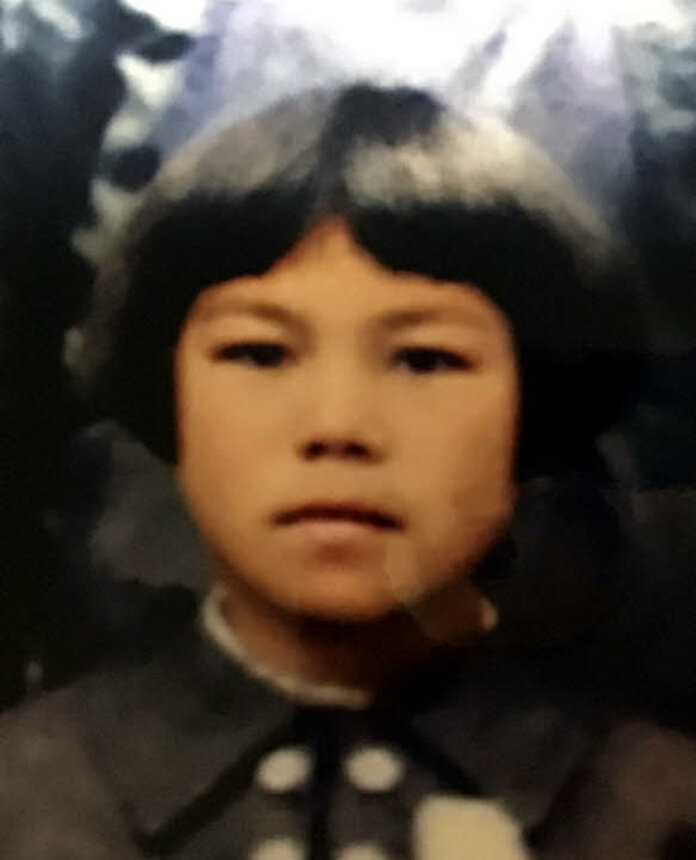
- Sasamori c. 1944
- Born: Shigeko Niimoto; June 16, 1932; Hiroshima, Empire of Japan
- Died: December 15, 2024 (aged 92); Marina del Rey, California, U.S.
- Occupation: Nurse's aide
- Known for: Survivor of the Hiroshima atomic bombing and peace advocacy

Shigeko Sasamori (笹森恵子; née Niimoto; June 16, 1932 – December 15, 2024) was a Japanese peace and anti-nuclear activist. After the atomic bombing of Hiroshima on August 6, 1945 left her with severe burn injuries throughout her body, she helped found a support group for other young women who had survived the bombing alongside Methodist minister Kiyoshi Tanimoto in 1951. In 1955, as one of the 25 Hiroshima Maidens, she traveled to the United States to receive reconstructive surgery, which restored much of her face and improved her manual dexterity. While there, she formed a close relationship with Norman Cousins, the editor of the Saturday Review of Literature.

After her surgeries, with Cousins's support, Sasamori lived in the United States for most of her life. She worked in various nursing and care-related positions throughout the country, including as a live-in nurse for the photographer Margaret Bourke-White. Later in life, she became active in the renewed anti-nuclear movement that grew to prominence during the late 1970s and early 1980s, addressing audiences about the impacts of nuclear war. She appeared in the documentary White Light/Black Rain: The Destruction of Hiroshima and Nagasaki in 2007 and was active with the Hibakusha Stories project. She died in Marina del Rey, California, at the age of 92.

== Early life and bombing of Hiroshima ==
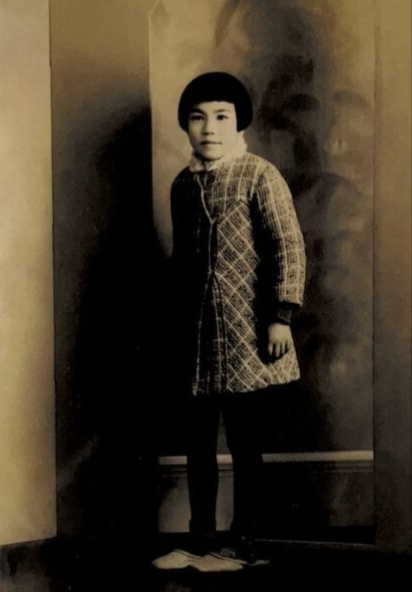
Sasamori c. 1944

Shigeko Sasamori was born Shigeko Niimoto on June 16, 1932, in Hiroshima, Japan. Her father, Masayuki Niimoto, was an oyster fisherman, and her mother, Sato Niimoto (née Tanabe), a homemaker. On August 6, 1945, at the age of 13, she survived the atomic bombing of Hiroshima. She was about two miles (3.2 km) from the explosion's hypocenter, suffering severe burns on over a quarter of her body, including her face, chest, arms, and hands.

After being knocked out by the blast, Sasamori met with her friend, Sachiko Araki. The two tried to free Araki's mother from the debris of Araki's destroyed home but were forced to abandon her when the neighboring house caught fire. Sasamori fled into the Motoyasu River, where many others were also seeking refuge. However, when several people drowned after being pushed into the river depths by the crowd, she returned to shore and ran toward her school, where she fainted. She awoke in the school auditorium, unable to move due to her injuries. She remained there for four days before her mother found her. She was taken to her parents' summer house on an improvised stretcher.

Sasamori recovered quickly, and by October, was able to sit up in bed. She initially stayed indoors as her injuries healed but eventually ventured out, visiting the church of Methodist minister Kiyoshi Tanimoto in summer 1951 out of boredom. Tanimoto later invited her to a neighborhood meeting of other hibakusha. She went hoping to make friends but disliked the older adult attendees, finding their stories unduly miserable and overly political. On the way home, she talked to Tanimoto about establishing a support group for young women affected by the bomb. Tanimoto agreed to arrange a meeting with several women he knew.

== Hiroshima Maidens ==
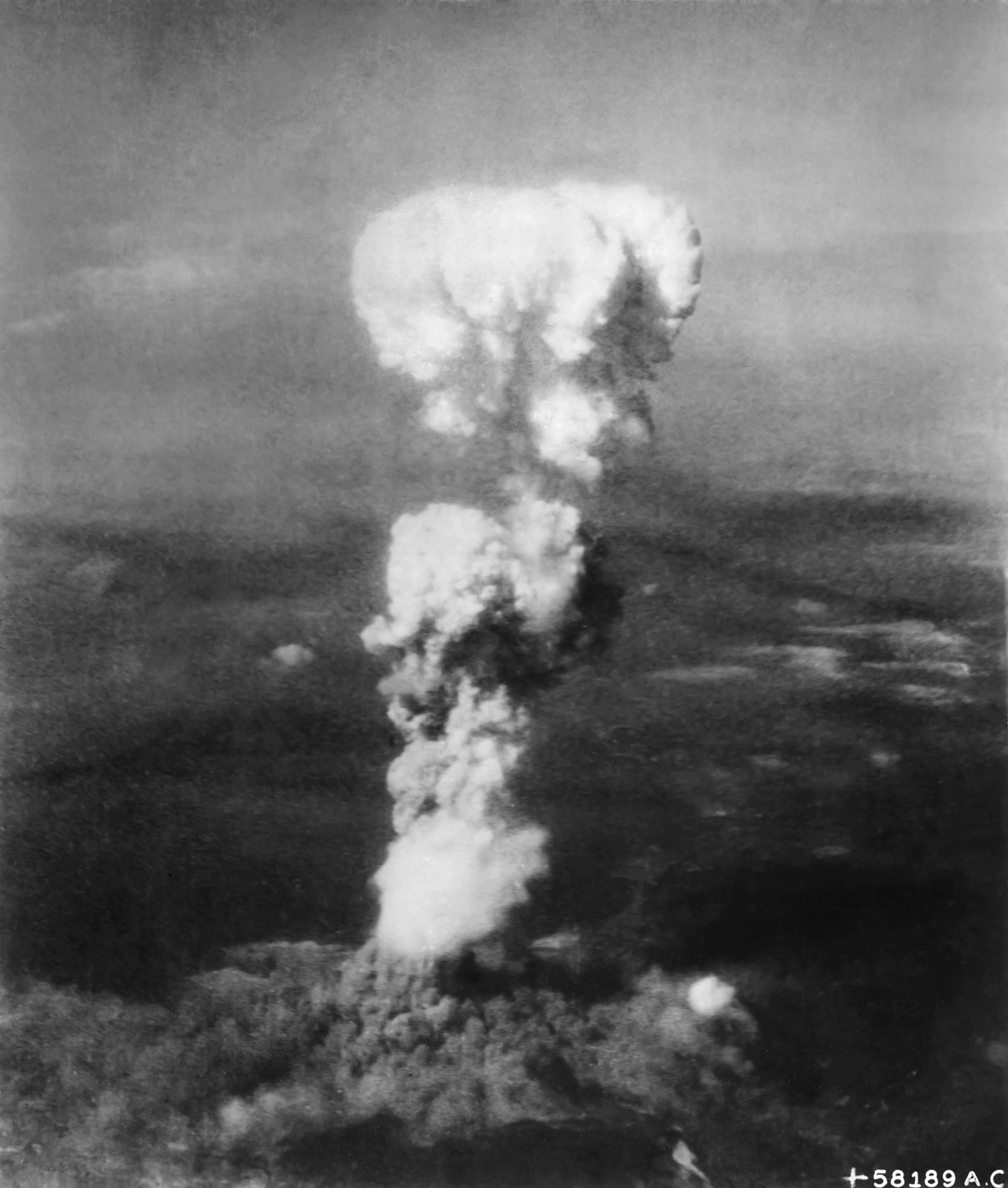
Sasamori survived the atomic bombing of Hiroshima, making her a hibakusha.

The group, which consisted of about 40 unmarried hibakusha women, met in the basement of Tanimoto's church. Tanimoto faced resistance when he tried to seek medical care for the women in Hiroshima, where they were known as "Tanimoto's Keloid Girls", and attempts at reconstructive surgery in Tokyo and Osaka were unsuccessful. He began working with the editor of the Saturday Review of Literature, Norman Cousins, to promote the women's cause, convincing Cousins that the best course of action was to take them to the United States to receive surgery there. Cousins coined the term "Hiroshima Maidens" to describe the women. Twenty-five of the Maidens, including Sasamori, met the criteria for reconstructive surgery at Mount Sinai Hospital in New York City. They left for New York in April 1955 and, after visiting Hawaii and California, arrived the following month.

In New York, Sasamori underwent multiple surgeries over the course of a year. Doctors initially encountered difficulties treating her wounds, but ultimately, while her scars were still visible, the surgeries reconstructed her face and improved her manual dexterity. Most of the Maidens recuperated with Quaker host families after their surgeries, but Sasamori stayed in Cousins's family's guest room at their house in New Canaan, Connecticut, forming a close relationship with Cousins and comforting him after one of the Maidens died during surgery. She returned to Japan in November 1956.

== Career ==
=== Education and early career ===
In 1957, Sasamori returned to the United States, living with the Cousins family in New Canaan, where she was treated like a family member. In June of that year, Cousins delivered the commencement speech at the Waterbury School of Nursing, and soon after, Sasamori was accepted into the fall class, leading her to believe that Cousins had struck a deal with the school on her behalf. In August 1958, she participated in a march in New York from Bryant Park to the United Nations Plaza, where she was presented with flowers and gave a brief address discussing her love for Japan and the United States. She also stated her desire to become a "citizen of the world".

Sasamori struggled with her studies, and eventually, she dropped out of nursing school, moved in with a nisei family in New York, and took a job as a nurse's aide at St. Luke's Hospital in Manhattan (now Mount Sinai Morningside). There, she cleaned patients' bedpans and served them meals. Around this time, she became integrated into the local Japanese-American community and started regularly receiving social invitations. In 1959, she was selected as the "Queen of the 442nd" at an annual dance organized by former members of the 442nd Infantry Regiment, a Japanese-American combat unit that fought in World War II.

=== Pregnancy and single motherhood ===
She also began a romance with a young man whose father was a member of the Japanese House of Councillors. After she became pregnant, this young man, whose surname was Sasamori, left her. She traveled to Los Angeles to seek support from Helen Yokoyama, a Japanese-American woman who had acted as the Maidens' "den mother" while they were in the United States. While in California, she gave birth to a boy, whom she named Norman Cousins Sasamori, on September 21, 1962.

Several months later, Shigeko moved back to Connecticut, where Cousins helped her obtain a position as a live-in nurse for photographer Margaret Bourke-White, who had Parkinson's disease. She bathed, cooked for, and shopped for Bourke-White, as well as helping her with speech and physical therapy. After a year, Bourke-White's regular nurse returned, and Shigeko briefly left for Japan to try to learn a trade from her brother. However, as a single mother, she was unable to find the time to do so, and she returned to the United States to work at Mount Sinai Hospital as a nurse's aide.

After moving back in with Cousins for a period, Shigeko moved to Newton, Massachusetts, where she attempted to establish herself as a "healer", taking shiatsu massage classes and continuing her work as a nurse's aide. She also worked as a freelance home care therapist for people with physical disabilities, mostly victims of accidents or strokes. She usually worked part-time so she would have time to care for her son. Cousins also provided her with financial support.

=== Activism ===
In the late 1970s and early 1980s, global nuclear anxiety grew amidst the Soviet–Afghan War and the election of Ronald Reagan in the United States. A renewed anti-nuclear movement emerged from this anxiety, with movement activists organizing the March for Nuclear Disarmament in 1982, the largest protest in the history of the United States at the time. Shigeko became active in this movement, addressing students, international organizations, and legislators. In 1980, she testified before a United States Senate subcommittee, describing the health impacts of nuclear war.

Shigeko appeared in the 1982 documentary Race to Oblivion, and in 1983, she published her autobiography, Go on, Shigeko, in Japan. She later appeared in the 2007 documentary White Light/Black Rain: The Destruction of Hiroshima and Nagasaki. At a screening of the documentary held in New York, she participated in a discussion with the documentary's director, Steven Okazaki, and Theodore Van Kirk, a crew member of the Enola Gay. Van Kirk argued that the bombing of Hiroshima saved lives, while Shigeko argued that bombing innocent civilians did not lead to an early end to the war. She also participated in Hibakusha Stories, a program that aims to educate young people about the effects of nuclear weapons through firsthand survivor testimonies.

== Later life and death ==
Shigeko spent her later years in Marina del Rey, California, and remained active in peace advocacy until her death there on December 15, 2024, at the age of 92. Her death came shortly after the 2024 Nobel Peace Prize was awarded to Nihon Hidankyo, a Japanese organization of atomic bomb survivors.

== Sources ==
- Adelman, Marguerite (2019). "Burlington Branch Hosts Two Atomic Bomb Survivors". Peace and Freedom. 79 (1). ISSN 0015-9093.
- Barker, Rodney (1985). The Hiroshima Maidens: A Story of Courage, Compassion, and Survival. New York: Viking. ISBN 0-670-80609-9.
- Fujino, Diane C. (2005). Heartbeat of Struggle: The Revolutionary Life of Yuri Kochiyama. Minneapolis: University of Minnesota Press. ISBN 978-0-8166-4593-0. OCLC 57069512.
- Krajcsik, Janet (2019). "Hiroshima bombing survivor and grandson of President Truman get together for "Navigating Peace"". Penn Live.
- Maar, Henry Richard III (2022). Freeze!: The Grassroots Movement to Halt the Arms Race and End the Cold War. Cornell University Press. ISBN 978-1-5017-6089-1.
- Mizumoto, Kazumi (2009). "新たな潮流と先の見えない課題: 2007 年の核をめぐる動向と論調" [New Trends and Unforeseen Challenges: Developments and Discourses Surrounding Nuclear Issues in 2007] (PDF). 広島平和記念資料館資料調査研究会研究報告 [Hiroshima Peace Memorial Museum Research Study Group Research Report] (Report). Vol. 5. Hiroshima: Hiroshima Peace Memorial Museum. pp. 59–79.
- Odo, Franklin (2024). "442nd Regimental Combat Team". Densho Encyclopedia.
- Phu, Thy (2012). Picturing Model Citizens: Civility in Asian American Visual Culture. Philadelphia: Temple University Press. ISBN 978-1-4399-0721-4.
- Sandomir, Richard (2024). "Shigeko Sasamori, Hiroshima Survivor Who Preached Peace, Dies at 92". New York Times. Archived from the original on December 30, 2024.
- Serlin, David (2004). Replaceable You: Engineering the Body in Postwar America. Chicago: University of Chicago Press. ISBN 978-0-226-74883-2.
