= Terufumi Sasaki =

Surgeon at the Red Cross hospital in Hiroshima, survivor of the atomic bomb

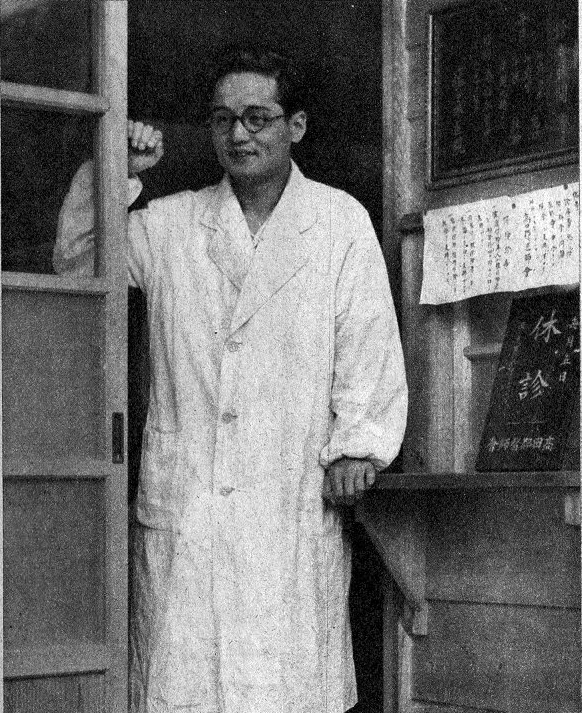
Dr. Terufumi Sasaki

Terufumi Sasaki (Japanese: 佐々木 輝文, Hepburn: Sasaki Terufumi) was a surgeon at the Red Cross hospital in Hiroshima and was situated 1,650 yards (1,510 m) from the hypocenter of the Little Boy explosion on August 6, 1945. Twenty-five years old that year, out of an initial 30 interviewed, he became one of the six central characters found in John Hersey's 1946 story for The New Yorker magazine that was subsequently published as the book Hiroshima. He lived at his family home in Mukaihara district prior to the detonation and practiced medicine in communities with poor health care without a permit.

After the detonation occurred, he was one of the first to observe, document, and attempt to treat "atomic bomb sickness," now known as acute radiation syndrome. Dr. Sasaki led intensive research into the syndrome in the weeks and months after the bombing, leading to the establishment of three recorded stages of the syndrome. Within 25 to 30 days of the explosion, Sasaki noticed a sharp drop in white blood cell count and established this drop, along with symptoms of fever, as prognostic standards for Acute Radiation Syndrome. In the years afterward he would become one of the leading surgeons continuing to document and treat the Hibakusha (explosion-affected) community, serving as an important source of knowledge for the Atomic Bomb Casualty Commission, and later Radiation Effects Research Foundation, who began and continue the Life Span Study of atomic bomb survivors, respectively.

== Dosage ==
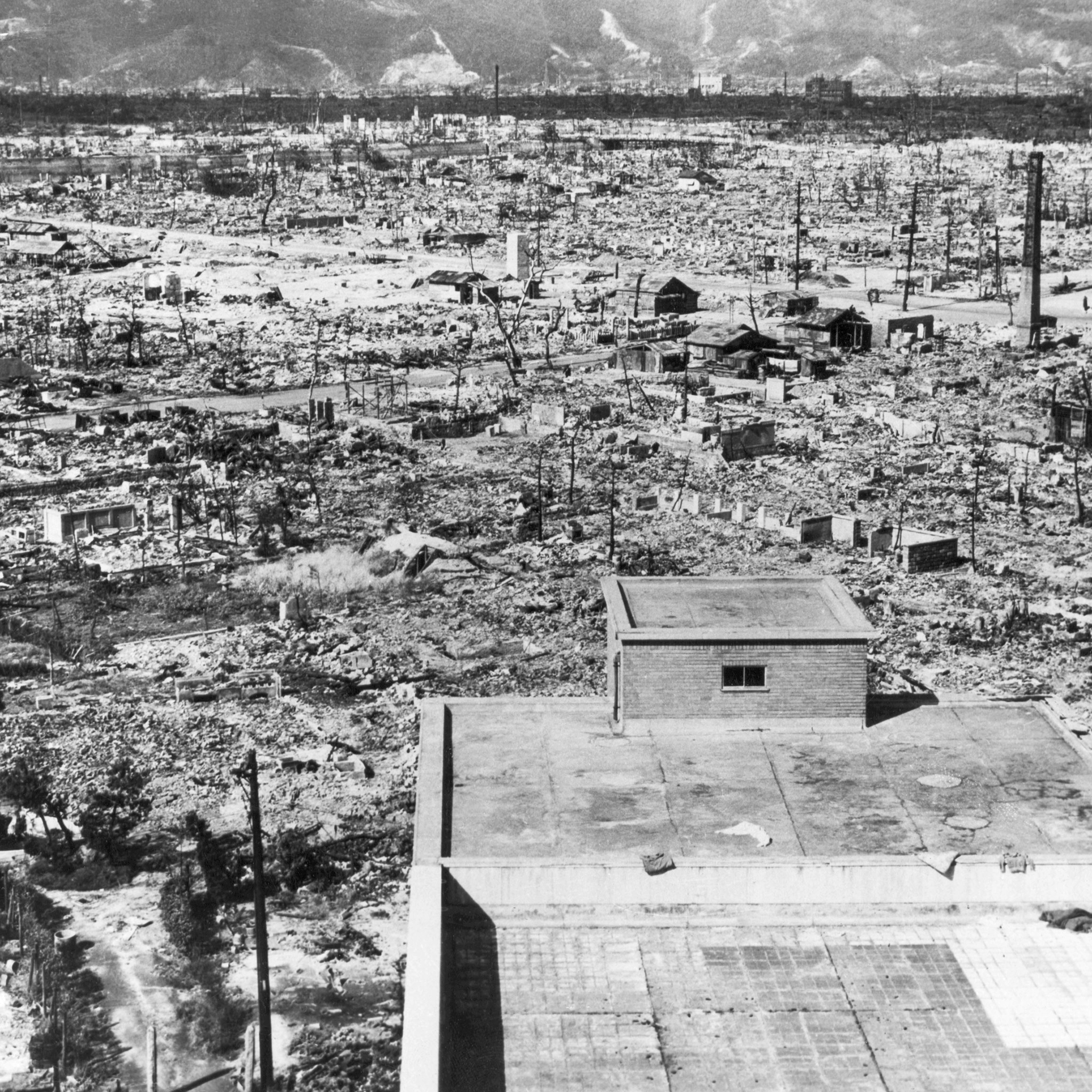
Picture of Hiroshima taken from the roof of the Red Cross Hospital.

The gamma ray dose received by a set of photographic film, and therefore those within the reinforced concrete Red Cross building at Hiroshima, was approximately 15 rad on the third floor.
