= Trinity: A Graphic History of the First Atomic Bomb =

Graphic novel by Jonathan Fetter-Vorm

- Author: Jonathan Fetter-Vorm
- Illustrator: Jonathan Fetter-Vorm
- Language: English
- Genre: Young adult, Non-fiction
- Publisher: Hill and Wang
- Publication date: 2012
- Publication place: United States
- Media type: Print
- Pages: 154 pp.
- ISBN: 978-0-8090-9468-4
- OCLC: 752471723

Trinity: A Graphic History of the First Atomic Bomb is the debut graphic novel written and illustrated by Jonathan Fetter-Vorm. It provides an account of the Manhattan Project and the atomic bombings of Hiroshima and Nagasaki, as well as mentioning the chain of events after. The title arises from the code-name, Trinity, given to the test site for the first nuclear weapon.

The book is written as a "work of history", although Fetter-Vorm writes at the end of the book "for the most part, the dialog from the principal characters in this book is taken from written records. When that was impossible, I introduced language that hews closely to what I have learned of these characters over the course of my research..." He goes on to provide a bibliography of the works he consulted in creating the book.

== Plot summary ==
Trinity begins with a conversation between a soldier named Private Daniels and J. Robert Oppenheimer as they are entering Los Alamos National Laboratory in New Mexico. Oppenheimer asks Daniels if he has ever heard of Prometheus, and upon receiving a "No, sir", recounts the myth.

The novel then goes back in time to 1898, when the Marie Curie and her husband discover radioactivity. The story presents a brief timeline that continues up into the 1930s, when James Chadwick discovers neutrons and the discovery of nuclear fission. The novel takes a shift, and begins to discuss the political environment. Leo Szilard becomes troubled as he sees the dangers that these nuclear weapons could produce, and travels with Eugene Wigner to talk with Albert Einstein about the possibility of Nazi scientists creating a bomb. News soon reaches the United States president, who authorizes the precursor to the Manhattan Project. After the bombing of Pearl Harbor, the United States founds covertly Los Alamos National Laboratory and other cities to create nuclear weapons. The scientists and their families are sworn to secrecy. Soon, the scientists at Los Alamos discover how to create a nuclear chain reaction, leading to the development of the first atomic weapons: Little Boy and Fat Man.

Soon, the day of the Trinity test arrives, and President Truman receives notice at the Potsdam Conference in Potsdam, Germany. Although it has ended in Europe, the war continues in the Pacific, with Japan refusing to surrender even after the aerial raid of Tokyo. The author briefly mentions history of warfare weapons, up to the new atomic bomb. Eventually, Truman authorizes the bombing of Hiroshima. The crew from Enola Gay is seen on their way to the skies over Hiroshima, and then drop the bomb. The book describes in detail what happens:

"The effect was like this: The heat and the light hit before the sound. Now, in a world without sight or sound, a wave of air traveling at more than 800 miles per hour sweeps outwards in all directions. In its wake comes the earth-trembling roar of the atmosphere aflame. The blast is so hot that everything flammable within a few hundred yards of ground zero vaporizes in a flash of smoke. Then suddenly the air pressure spikes. Your eyes and your lungs bulge, swell, and burst. Your eardrums explode. In a few seconds the air pressure settles back to normal, and the wind slow...and then picks up speed in the opposite direction, sucking everything inward to the churning heart of the explosion."

The news of the bombing becomes worldwide. The Japanese still refuse to surrender. The US prepares to drop a bomb on the city of Kokura, but cannot because of the weather; at the same time, there is not enough fuel to carry the bomb back to the US base in Tinian. As a result, the flight crew ends up dropping the bomb on Nagasaki.

The book cuts out to a scene of two children on their way home from school when the bomb drops and incinerates them. One of the boys is still alive, and walking around searching for water, as the view pans out to the carnage and death that resulted from the bombing. Japan ends up surrendering.

In the aftermath, the survivors begin to be afflicted by a mysterious disease, called Disease X, which turns out to be radiation poisoning. The world now sees the possible results of nuclear warfare, and the doctrine of mutually assured destruction arises. Nuclear weapons begin to proliferate. The public now prepares itself as it enters into the new Atomic Age.

== Reception ==
The book was published to generally positive reviews. Ray Olson, writing in Booklist, praised the artwork and design, saying that "the page layouts are attractively busy and varied, never crowded and hard to read, while the text proceeds stepwise down each page, never courting confusion by running in circles or zigzagging...", and finishing by calling the book "exemplary".

One reviewer, however, writing for Publishers Weekly, found the text confusing to follow and derided the marketing, along with book itself, because of "flat illustrations, heavy use of captions, and stiff, static panels of talking heads".

== See also ==
- Bulletin of the Atomic Scientists
- Hiroshima (1946)
- Los Alamos Primer (1992)
- Survival Under Atomic Attack (1950)
- List of books about nuclear issues
