= Rodney Barker (writer) =

American investigative journalist and writer (born 1946)

- Born: February 9, 1946 (age 80); Lewisburg, Pennsylvania, U.S.
- Education: Knox College (BA)
- Occupations: Journalist and writer

Rodney Barker (born February 9, 1946), also known as Rod Barker, is an American investigative journalist and writer. He has published several books with Simon & Schuster, Viking Books, Ballantine Books, and other major American publishers.

== Early life and education ==
Barker was born on February 9, 1946, in Lewisburg, Pennsylvania, and raised in Darien, Connecticut. Barker received his BA degree, majoring in philosophy, from Knox College in 1968 and then went to the San Francisco State University for a two-year creative writing master's program.

== Career ==
After attending the Creative Writing Masters Program at San Francisco State University, Barker started his writing career as the editor of a Durango, Colorado weekly newspaper. He moved on to working as a freelance investigative reporter and feature writer for various regional and national magazines, before becoming a full-time author of non-fiction books.

In 1985, Barker published his first book, The Hiroshima Maidens: A Story of Courage, Compassion and Survival, which was the first published account of an international philanthropic project that brought twenty-five Japanese women, severely disfigured in the atomic bombing of Hiroshima, to the United States in 1955 for reconstructive surgery. The women resided in the homes of American Quakers while recovering from surgery, and two of them stayed with Barker's family when he was nine. His book, published on the 40th anniversary of the bombing, chronicles the complex history of the project, and follows the women's lives when they returned to Japan.

His second book, The Broken Circle: A True Story of Murder and Magic in Indian Country, was published in 1992. The book chronicles the events surrounding the mutilation murders of three Navajo men in 1974 by local teenagers in Farmington, New Mexico, the violent aftermath, and the struggle by Native American activists to create a positive civil rights legacy.

In 1996, Barker authored his third book, Dancing with the Devil: Sex, Espionage and the U.S. Marines: the Clayton Lonetree Story, in light of research opportunities that opened up in the former Soviet Union with the end of the Cold War. In this book, Barker unveils previously unknown facts about the headline-making sex-for-secrets Marine spy scandal at the U.S. Embassy in Moscow in the late 1980s.

And the Waters Turned to Blood, his fourth book, was published in 1997, and tells the true story of the toxic microorganism, Pfisteria, that emerged in the polluted coastal waters of North Carolina, causing fish kills and human health effects, and the struggle of a female scientist, Dr. JoAnn Burkholder, to get state and federal authorities to respond.

In 2002, Barker took a break from writing to mount a Santa Fe, New Mexico-based philanthropic public art project called The Trail of Painted Ponies, which he expanded into a collectible horse figurine company of the same name.

== Bibliography ==
- The Hiroshima Maidens: A Story of Courage, Compassion, and Survival. New York: Viking Books, 1985.
- The Broken Circle: A True Story of Murder and Magic in Indian Country. New York: Simon & Schuster, 1992.
- Dancing with the Devil: Sex, Espionage, and the U.S. Marines: The Clayton Lonetree Story. New York: Ballantine Books, 1996.
- And the Waters Turned to Blood: The Ultimate Biological Threat. New York: Simon & Schuster, 1997.
- The Trail of the Painted Ponies. 2nd ed. Santa Fe, NM: Trail of the Painted Ponies, 2002.
