= Hiroshima (book) =

1946 book by John Hersey

- First edition
- Author: John Hersey
- Language: English
- Publisher: Alfred A. Knopf, Inc.
- Publication date: 1946
- Pages: 160 pp
- ISBN: 978-0679721031
- OCLC: 680840
- Dewey Decimal: 940.54/25 19
- LC Class: D767.25.H6 H4 1989

Hiroshima is a 1946 book by American author John Hersey. It tells the stories of six survivors of the atomic bomb dropped on Hiroshima. It is regarded as one of the earliest examples of New Journalism, in which the story-telling techniques of fiction are adapted to non-fiction reporting.

The work was originally published in The New Yorker, which had planned to run it over four issues but instead dedicated the entire edition of August 31, 1946, to a single article. Less than two months later, the article was printed as a book by Alfred A. Knopf. Never out of print, it has sold more than three million copies. "Its story became a part of our ceaseless thinking about world wars and nuclear holocaust," New Yorker essayist Roger Angell wrote in 1995.

== Background ==
Before writing Hiroshima, Hersey had been a war correspondent in the field, writing for Life magazine and The Nan working in the Pacific Theater and followed Lt. John F. Kennedy through the Solomon Islands. One of the first Western journalists to view the ruins of Hiroshima after the bombing, Hersey was commissioned by William Shawn of The New Yorker to write articles about the impact of a nuclear explosion by using witness accounts, a subject virtually untouched by journalists. Hersey interviewed many witnesses; he focused his article on six in particular.

=== Publication in The New Yorker ===
Hersey's article was published in the August 31, 1946, issue and began where the magazine's regular "Talk of the Town" column usually began. At the bottom of the page, the editors appended a short note: "TO OUR READERS. The New Yorker this week devotes its entire editorial space to an article on the almost complete obliteration of a city by one atomic bomb, and what happened to the people of that city. It does so in the conviction that few of us have yet comprehended the all but incredible destructive power of this weapon, and that everyone might well take time to consider the terrible implications of its use. The Editors." One of the few people other than the principal editors of The New Yorker tipped to the forthcoming publication was the magazine's principal writer E. B. White, to whom Harold Ross confided his plans. "Hersey has written thirty thousand words on the bombing of Hiroshima (which I can now pronounce in a new and fancy way)", Ross wrote to White in Maine, "one hell of a story, and we are wondering what to do about it ... [William Shawn, managing editor of The New Yorker] wants to wake people up, and says we are the people with a chance to do it, and probably the only people that will do it, if it is done."

=== Literary reception ===
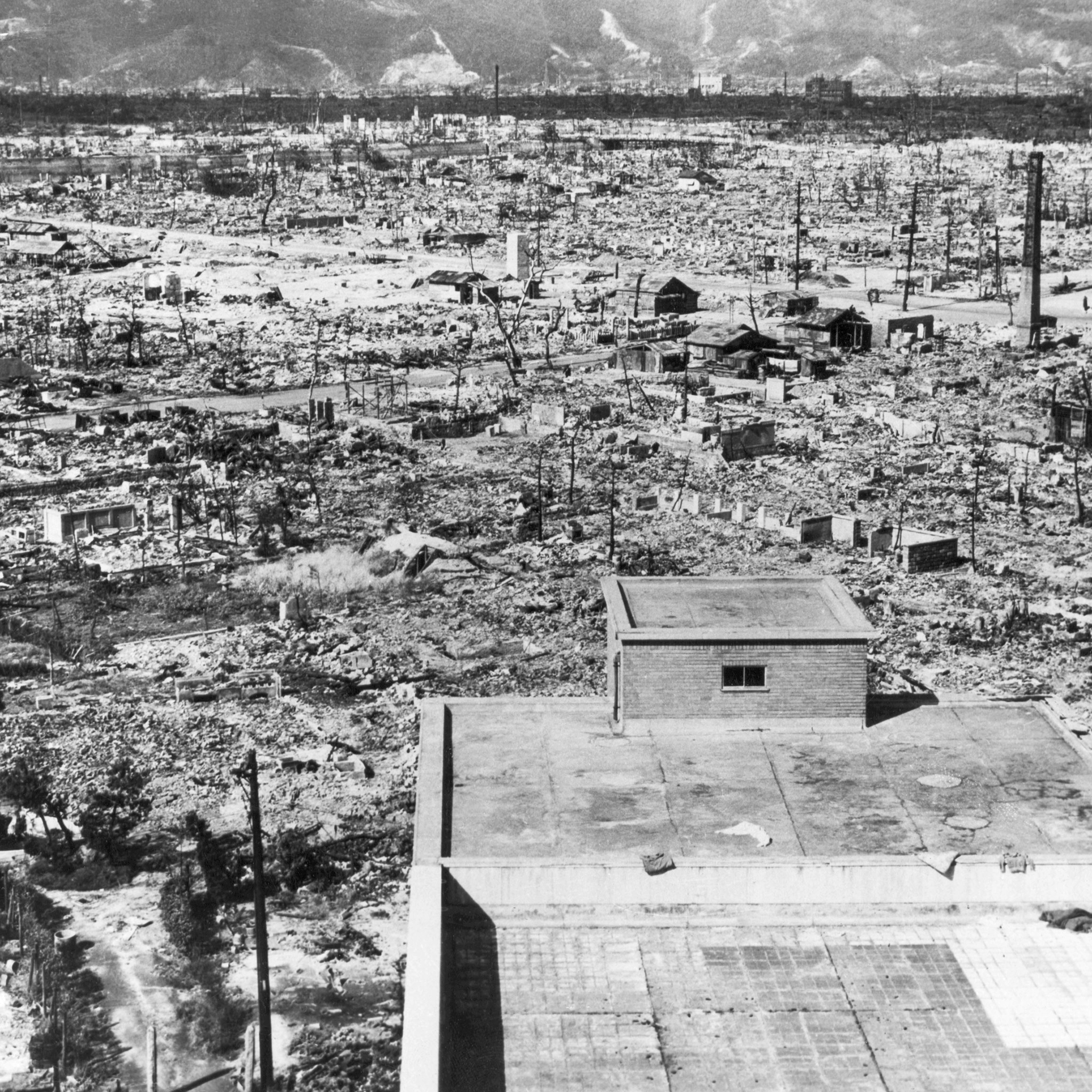
Hiroshima in ruins, October 1945, two months after the atomic bomb exploded.

Containing a detailed description of the bomb's effects, the article was a publishing sensation. In plain prose, Hersey described the horrifying aftermath of the atomic device: people with melted eyeballs, or people vaporized, leaving only their shadows etched onto walls. The New Yorker article Hiroshima was an immediate best seller and was sold out at newsstands within hours. Many requests for reprints were received by the magazine's offices. The ABC Radio Network preempted regular programming to broadcast readings of the complete text by well-known actors in four half-hour programs. This broadcast received an honorable mention at the 1946 Peabody Awards. Many radio stations abroad did likewise, including the BBC in Britain, where newsprint rationing that continued after the war's end prevented its publication; Hersey would not permit editing of the piece to cut its length. The Book of the Month Club rushed a copy of the article into book format, which it sent to members as a free selection, saying "We find it hard to conceive of anything being written that could be of more important [sic] at this moment to the human race."

Published a little more than a year after the atomic bomb was dropped on Hiroshima, it showed the American public a different interpretation of the Japanese from what had been previously described in the media. After reading Hiroshima, a Manhattan Project scientist wrote that he wept as he remembered how he had celebrated the dropping of the atomic bomb. Scientists along with the American public felt shame and guilt at the suffering of the people of Hiroshima.

The 31,000 word article was published later the same year by Alfred A. Knopf as a book. Hersey's work is often cited as one of the earliest examples of New Journalism in its melding of elements of non-fiction reportage with the pace and devices of the novel. Hersey's plain prose was praised by critics as a model of understated narrative. Hersey rarely gave interviews and abhorred going on anything resembling book tours, as his longtime editor Judith Jones recalled. "If ever there was a subject calculated to make a writer overwrought and a piece overwritten, it was the bombing of Hiroshima", wrote Hendrik Hertzberg; "yet Hersey's reporting was so meticulous, his sentences and paragraphs were so clear, calm and restrained, that the horror of the story he had to tell came through all the more chillingly."

The author said he adopted the plain style to suit the story he strove to tell. "The flat style was deliberate", Hersey said 40 years later, "and I still think I was right to adopt it. A high literary manner, or a show of passion, would have brought me into the story as a mediator. I wanted to avoid such mediation, so the reader's experience would be as direct as possible."

The founder of The New Yorker Harold Ross told his friend, author Irwin Shaw: "I don't think I've ever got as much satisfaction out of anything else in my life." But The New Yorker's publication of Hersey's article caused trouble with respect to Hersey's relationship with Henry Luce, the co-founder of Time-Life and Hersey's first mentor, who felt Hersey should have reported the event for one of Luce's magazines instead. Despite Luce's misgivings about Hersey's choice of The New Yorker to print the Hiroshima story, the magazine's format and style allowed the author much more freedom in reporting and writing. The Luce publications – Time, Life and Fortune – had nothing similar. Moreover, The New Yorker went to unprecedented lengths to keep the Hersey story secret. The weekly magazine's top editors observed complete secrecy about the printing of the article. While editors Harold Ross and William Shawn spent long hours editing and deliberating every sentence, the magazine's staff was not told anything about the forthcoming issue. Staffers were baffled when the normal weekly proofs were not returned, and their inquiries were not answered. Even the advertisement department was deliberately not informed.

Time magazine said about Hiroshima:

Every American who has permitted himself to make jokes about atom bombs, or who has come to regard them as just one sensational phenomenon that can now be accepted as part of civilization, like the airplane and the gasoline engine, or who has allowed himself to speculate as to what we might do with them if we were forced into another war, ought to read Mr. Hersey. When this magazine article appears in book form the critics will say that it is in its fashion a classic. But it is rather more than that.

The magazine later termed Hersey's account of the bombing "the most celebrated piece of journalism to come out of World War II."

It was also met with approval by The New Republic which said "Hersey's piece is certainly one of the great classics of the war". While the majority of the excerpts praised the article, Mary McCarthy said that "to have done the atomic bomb justice, Mr. Hersey would have had to interview the dead". It was quickly a book in the Book-of-the-Month Club; it was distributed for free because of the questions it raised about the humanity of the human race.

=== Publication in Japan ===
Although the US military government (headed by Douglas MacArthur) dissuaded publishers from bringing out the book in Japan, small numbers of copies were distributed; in January 1947 Hersey gave a reading in English in Tokyo. A Japanese translation of Hiroshima was first published in 1949 in Japan; it has not been out of print since. According to Gar Alperovitz in The Decision to Use the Atomic Bomb, "Occupation authorities suppressed various accounts of the atomic bombings. A noteworthy instance involved the denial in later 1946 of a request by the Nippon Times to publish John Hersey's Hiroshima (in English)." MacArthur said in 1948 that despite numerous charges of censorship made against the censor's office by the US news media, Hiroshima was not banned in Japan.

== Outline ==
The article begins on the morning of August 6, 1945, the day the atomic bomb was dropped, killing an estimated 135,000 people. The book begins with the following sentence:

At exactly fifteen minutes past eight in the morning on August 6, 1945, Japanese time, at the moment when the atomic bomb flashed above Hiroshima, Miss Toshiko Sasaki, a clerk in the personnel department of the East Asia Tin Works, had just sat down at her place in the plant office and was turning her head to speak to the girl at the next desk.

— Hiroshima, John Hersey, 1946

Hersey introduces the six characters: two doctors, a Protestant minister, a widowed seamstress, a young female factory worker and a German Catholic priest. It describes their mornings before the bomb was dropped. Through the book, the lives of these six people overlap as they share similar experiences. Each chapter covers a time period from the morning of the bombing to one year later for each witness. An additional chapter covering the aftermath 40 years after the bombing was added in later editions.

Book Characters
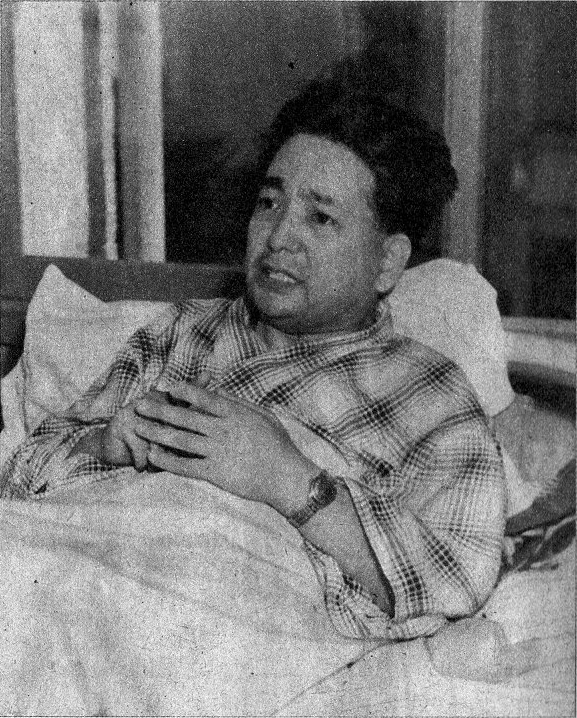
Kiyoshi Tanimoto

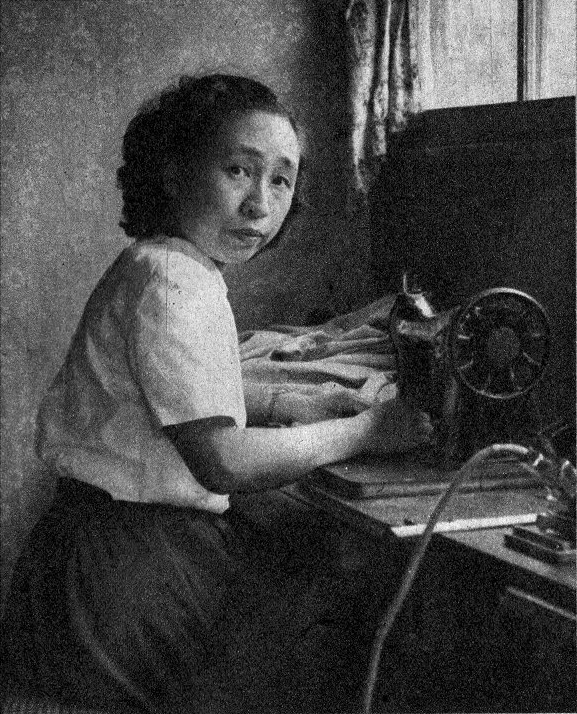
Toshiko Sasaki (Sister Dominique Sasaki)

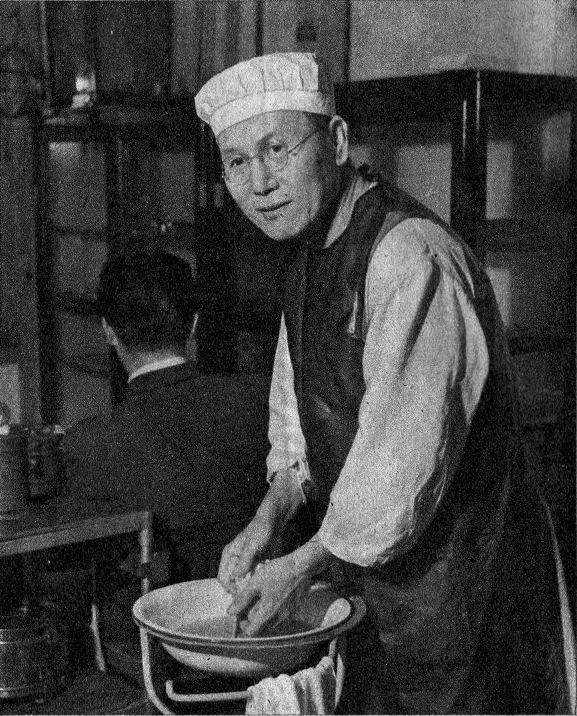
Dr. Masakazu Fujii

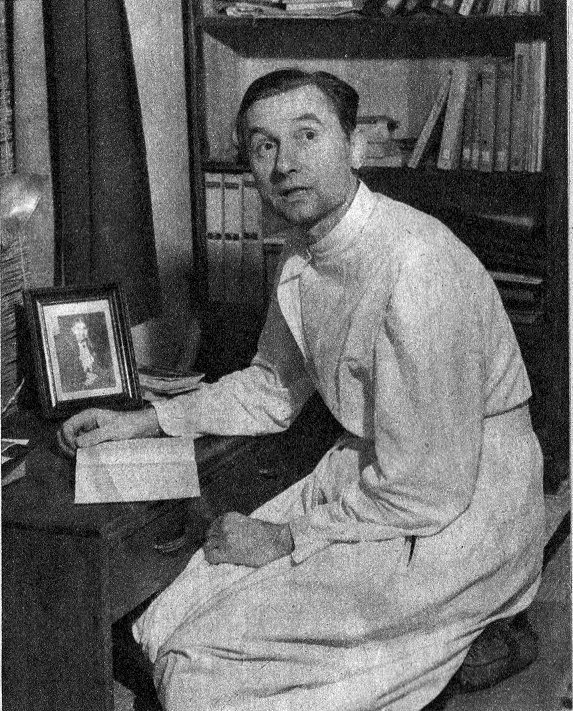
Father Wilhelm Kleinsorge (later Makoto Takakura)

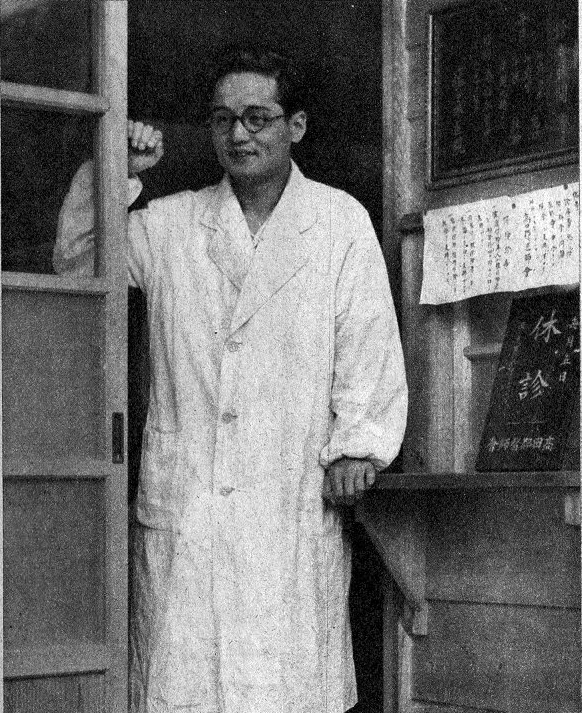
Dr. Terufumi Sasaki

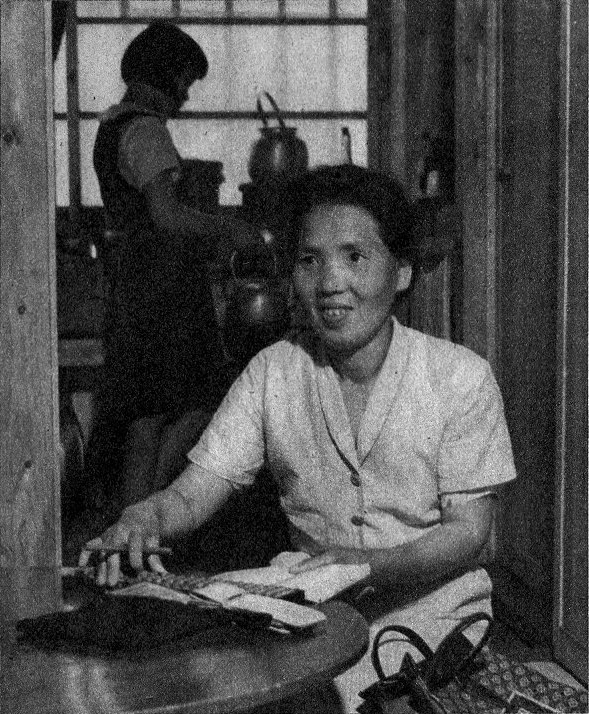
Mrs. Hatsuyo Nakamura

The six characters are:

Reverend Mr. Kiyoshi Tanimoto

Tanimoto is 3,500 yards (3,200 m) from the explosion. A pastor at Hiroshima Methodist Church, a small man in stature, "quick to talk, laugh and cry", weak yet fiery, cautious and thoughtful, he was educated in theology in the U.S. at Emory University, in Atlanta, Georgia, speaks excellent English, obsessed with being spied on, Chairman of Neighborhood Association.

Mrs. Hatsuyo Nakamura

Nakamura is 1,350 yards (1,230 m) from explosion center. She is a widow of a tailor who is raising her three children (10-year-old boy Toshio, eight-year-old girl Yaeko, and five-year-old girl Myeko). Her husband had been killed in Singapore in 1942.

Dr. Masakazu Fujii

Fujii is 1,550 yards (1,420 m) from explosion center. He is described as hedonistic, owner of a private 30-room hospital that contains modern equipment, has family living in Osaka and Kyushu, and is convivial and calm.

Father Wilhelm Kleinsorge (Makoto Takakura)

Kleinsorge is 1,400 yards (1,300 m) from explosion center. Kleinsorge at the time is a 38-year-old German Jesuit priest. Weakened by his wartime diet, he feels unaccepted by the Japanese people and has a "thin face, with a prominent Adam's apple, a hollow chest, dangling hands, big feet.". His father superior within the mission station is Hugo Lassalle.

Dr. Terufumi Sasaki

Dr. Terufumi Sasaki is 1,650 yards (1,510 m) from the center of the explosion. He works as a 25-year-old surgeon at the Red Cross Hospital. He lives with his mother in Mukaihara, an idealist. Upset with poor health services, he practices medicine without a permit in communities lacking in quality health care. He is not related to Miss Toshiko Sasaki.

Miss Toshiko Sasaki (Sister Dominique Sasaki)

Sasaki is 1,600 yards (1,500 m) from the center of the explosion. She is 20 years old and engaged to a soldier, as well as working as a "clerk in the personnel department of the East Asia Tin Works"

=== "A Noiseless Flash" ===
This chapter introduces the characters and details the witnesses' accounts of the morning before and their perception of the explosion of the atomic bomb. The explosion occurred at exactly 8:15 am, local time. Miss Toshiko is at her desk and talking to a fellow employee at the Tin factory when the room filled with "a blinding light" and the flash was so powerful that it pushed over a bookshelf crushing Miss Toshiko's leg while she went unconscious. She was covered with a bookshelf while the building collapsed around her. While sitting on his porch, Dr. Masakuza Fujii witnessed a "brilliant yellow" flash and toppled into the river. He injured his shoulder severely. After returning to her home from a safe area, Mrs. Nakamura saw a flash "whiter than any white she had" seen before. She was thrown into the next room while her children were buried in debris. While reading his morning paper, Father Wilhelm Kleinsorge witnesses a "terrible flash ... [like] a large meteor colliding with the earth". He found himself in the vegetable garden of the missionary with only small cuts. Standing alone in a corridor, Dr. Terufumi Sasaki saw a "gigantic photographic flash". The explosion ripped the hospital apart but Dr. Sasaki remained untouched except his glasses and shoes had been blown off his body. Dr. Sasaki was now the only doctor to be unhurt in the hospital and the hospital was quickly filled with patients. Reverend Kiyoshi Tanimoto saw a "tremendous flash of light cut across the sky". Tanimoto threw himself against a wall of his home and felt pressure, splinters, and debris falls on him.

=== "The Fire" ===
Chapter 2 documents the time immediately after the explosion where the fires are spreading and the witnesses are trying to save others and find safety for themselves. Immediately after the explosion, Reverend Tanimoto ran in search of his family and parishioners. He puts aside the search for his family when he comes across people in need of help and then resumes the search for his family. Mrs. Nakamura travels with her children and neighbor to Asano Park at the Jesuit mission house. Mrs. Nakamura and her children are continuously vomiting. Father Kleinsorge is found wandering the mission grounds with numerous pieces of glass in his back. Father Kleinsorge ran into his room and grabbed a first aid kit and his suitcase containing money and paperwork of the mission. Father Kleinsorge and others go out and bring food back for everyone at Asano Park.

Dr. Fujii's hospital was in the nearby river while he was trapped between its beams, unable to move. Dr. Fujii looks at the city and calls it "an endless parade of misery". Dr. Sasaki "worked without method" in deciding which patient would receive care next. Patients filled every inch of the hospital. People were throwing up everywhere. He became like a robot, repeating treatment on patient after patient. Miss Sasaki still lies unconscious under the bookshelf and crumbled building. Her leg is only severely broken. She is propped up alongside two badly wounded people and left. Father Kleinsorge sets off for Asano Park. Mr. Tanimoto has crossed town to find his family and parishioners. He apologizes to the wounded as he passes by for not being injured. Only out of luck does he run into his wife and child on the banks of the Ōta River. They split up so that she may return to Ushida and he may take care of the church.

=== "Details are Being Investigated" ===
Chapter three chronicles the days after the dropping of the bomb, the continuing troubles faced by the survivors, and the possible explanations for the massive devastation that the witnesses come across.

On August 12, the Nakamuras continued to be sick and discovered the rest of their family had perished. Mr. Tanimoto continues to ferry people from one side of the river to the other in hopes of bringing them to safety from the fires. Father Kleinsorge, weakened by his injuries and previous illness, remains in the Park. He is finally welcomed by the Japanese and no longer feels like a foreigner. Dr. Fujii sleeps on the floor of his destroyed family's home. His left clavicle is broken and is covered in many deep cuts. Ten thousand wounded have shown up at the Red Cross Hospital. Dr. Sasaki is still trying to attend to as many people as possible. All that can be done is to put saline on the worst burns. Dead patients were lying everywhere. Miss Sasaki is still left with no help outside the factory. Finally friends come to locate her body and she is transferred to a hospital.

At the end of the chapter, on August 15, the war is over.

=== "Panic Grass and Feverfew" ===
It has been twelve days since the bomb was dropped on Hiroshima. Four square miles of the city had been completely destroyed. Since the bombing, Hiroshima has been flooded, which continued chaos and destruction. Many people are now developing radiation sickness and a hatred for the Americans has been festering but decreased once Hiroshima was designated to have safe radiation levels. Father Kleinsorge's wounds were examined and found to have reopened and become inflamed. Even into September, Father Kleinsorge is getting worse. He was taken to the hospital for a high fever, anemia and low leukocyte levels. Mrs. Nakamura still felt nauseated and her hair began to fall out. Once given the okay that the radiation levels in Hiroshima were acceptable and her appearance was presentable, she returned to her home to retrieve her sewing machine but it was rusted and ruined. Mr. Tanimoto also fell ill without any notice. His fever reached 104 degrees Fahrenheit and he was given Vitamin B1 injections to combat the radiation disease. Miss Sasaki remains hospitalized and in pain. The infection has prevented doctors from being able to set her fractured leg. She was discharged from the hospital at the end of April but was severely crippled. Dr. Fujii is still living in a friend's summer home and his injuries have progressed well. He has been noting that many survivors are continuing to experience strange problems. He bought a new clinic in a Hiroshima suburb and once healed began a successful practice. Dr. Sasaki has been studying the progression of patients and assigned three stages to the disease. After six months, the Red Cross Hospital began to function normally. He remained the only surgeon on staff but finally had time to get married in March.

One year after the bombing, Mr. Tanimoto's church had been ruined and he no longer had his exceptional vitality; Mrs. Nakamura was destitute; Dr. Fujii had lost the thirty-room hospital it took him many years to acquire, and no prospects of rebuilding it; Father Kleinsorge was back in the hospital; Dr. Sasaki was not capable of the work he had once done; Miss Sasaki was a cripple.

=== "The Aftermath" ===
This chapter was added forty years after the initial publication in The New Yorker. It appeared in the July 15, 1985 issue of The New Yorker. Hersey returned to Hiroshima to learn what has become of the six survivors. His record of what he found became chapter 5 in subsequent editions of the book. The survivors of the Hiroshima bombing are now referred to as hibakusha (explosion-affected people). The Japanese initially refused to take any responsibility for the American atomic bombing or the population affected. The victims were discriminated against, and many employers refused to hire a hibakusha because they could not work as hard. Their exposure, called "A-bomb sickness" in Japan, left them with chronic weakness, dizziness and digestive issues, among others. In 1954, the Lucky Dragon No. 5 contamination incident created a political movement for the hibakusha and created the A-bomb Victims Medical Care Law. This law allowed for medical attention for the hibakusha and a monthly allowance for them.

Kiyoshi Tanimoto continued to preach the gospel to the people rebuilding in Hiroshima. He was brought to the United States by the Methodist Board of Missions to raise money for his church. On March 5, 1949, his memorandum, Hiroshima Ideas, was published. In 1950, he returned to America for his second speaking tour. On this trip, he spoke to members of the House Foreign Affairs Committee. Because of his worldwide tours, he was nicknamed "The A-bomb minister". In 1955, he returned to America with more Hiroshima Maidens, women who were school-age girls when they were seriously disfigured as a result of the bomb's thermal flash, and who went to the U.S. for reconstructive surgery. During this trip, he appeared on This Is Your Life with Ralph Edwards. He was surprised to meet Captain Robert Lewis, the co-pilot of the Enola Gay. He died on September 28, 1986.

For a time, Mrs. Nakamura made only enough income to get by and feed her family. She fell ill and could no longer work. To receive treatment, she was forced to sell her sewing machine. She worked odd jobs like delivering bread where she could take three or four days off to recover before working again. She continued to earn just enough to survive. She worked at a mothball factory for 13 years but did not immediately sign up for her health allowance through the A-bomb Victims Medical Care Law. She was invited to be a member of the Bereaved Family Association and traveled the world.

In 1948, Dr. Fujii built a new medical practice in Hiroshima. He was fortunate enough to face no long-lasting effects of the A-bomb sickness. Dr. Fujii died on January 12, 1973.

Father Wilhelm Kleinsorge continued to suffer from radiation exposure. In 1948, he was named the priest at a much larger church in another part of town. He became a Japanese citizen and changed his name to Father Makoto Takakura. He fell into a coma and died on November 19, 1977. There were always fresh flowers on his grave.

Dr. Terufumi Sasaki, who suffered no side effects from the bombing, was haunted by the images of the Red Cross Hospital after the bombing. In 1951, Dr. Sasaki quit working at the Red Cross Hospital. He started his own practice in his hometown and normally performed simple surgeries. He decided to build a geriatric hospital. He continued to regret not keeping better track of all the cremated bodies at the hospital.

Toshiko Sasaki was abandoned by her fiancé after being left crippled. Over a 14-month period she underwent orthopedic surgery to improve the condition of her leg. After working in an orphanage for five years, she became a nun with the Society of the Helpers of Holy Souls. Taking her final vows in 1953, she adopted the name of Sister Dominique. She was quickly noticed for her potential and made a director of the Garden of St. Joseph, an old people's home. She retired in 1978 and was rewarded with a trip to the Holy See. She did volunteer work and spent two years as Mother Superior at Misasa, where she had undergone her novitiate.

== Lasting impact ==
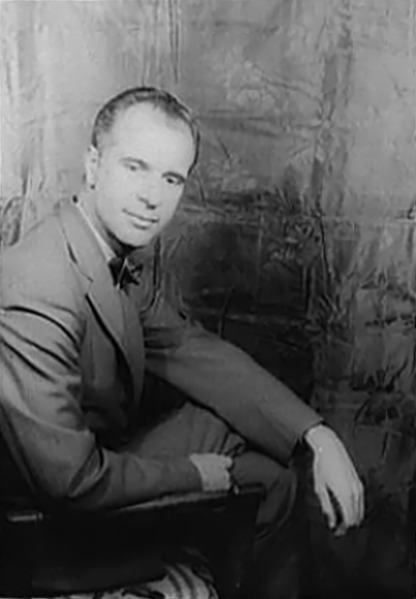
John Hersey

The publication of the article placed Hiroshima and the atomic bomb at the heart of the nuclear war debate. In Hiroshima in History and Memory, Michael J. Hogan writes that Hiroshima created a realization of the magnitude of the event and an entrance into the analysis of the event. It put forward three issues that before had not been faced: the force of modern science, the bomb and the future of nuclear weapons.

The events of the dropping of the atomic bomb live in the psyche of everyone and were brought to light by Hersey. Hiroshima has been "part of our ceaseless thinking about world wars and nuclear holocaust". The effects of the radiation sickness have continued to be a concern for the world and the safety of nuclear power. These concerns have resurfaced since the Fukushima Daiichi nuclear reactor incident. The images brought to the public after the publishing of Hiroshima were revived in the world's eyes.

In his essay From Yellow Peril to Japanese Wasteland: John Hersey's "Hiroshima", Patrick B. Sharp also saw Hiroshima as a counterpoint to "Yellow Peril" fiction like Flash Gordon and Buck Rogers, which were "narrated from the point of view of an 'everyman' who witnesses the invasion of his country first hand. As the narrators struggle to survive, we get to witness the horror of the attack through their eyes, and come to loathe the enemy aliens that have so cruelly and unjustly invaded their country." While in Yellow Peril fiction scientists and soldiers who defeat the invaders are portrayed as heroes, Hersey portrays Japanese and German clergymen, doctors, and other ordinary citizens as heroes.

Essays on the Red Circle Authors website included Hiroshima in the Atomic Bomb Literature cycle. Still, relevant anthologies like Nihon no Genbaku Bungaku or The Crazy Iris and Other Stories of the Atomic Aftermath are confined solely to Japanese writers. In her 1953 short story Fireflies, writer Yōko Ōta, a representative of the Atomic Bomb Literature, repeatedly refers to Hersey's report and Dr. Sasaki, whom she calls Dr. X in her story, "the young doctor that John Hersey had written about in Hiroshima".

In 1999, the original article was ranked as the finest piece of American journalism of the 20th century by a panel of experts assembled by New York University's journalism department.

The book was featured on BBC Radio 4's A Good Read in November 2020.

== See also ==
- Trinity: A Graphic History of the First Atomic Bomb
- List of books about nuclear issues
