= Kiyoshi Tanimoto =

Japanese Methodist minister (1909–1986)

- 谷本 清
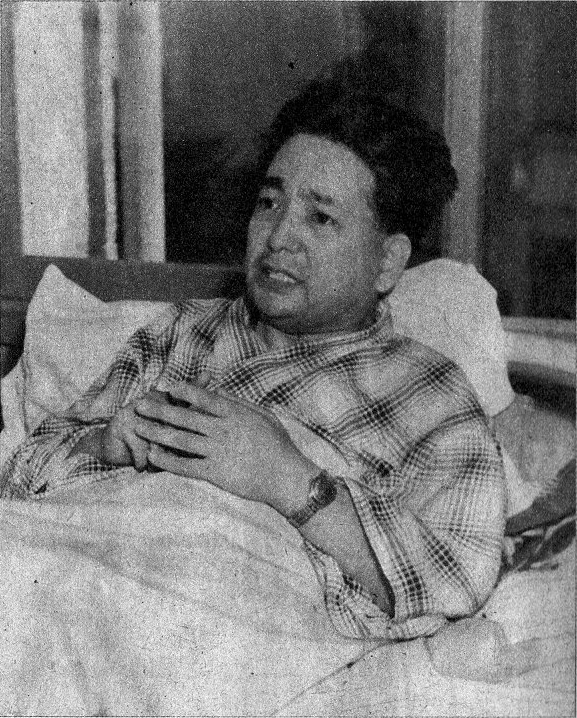
- Kiyoshi Tanimoto, c. 1950
- Born: June 27, 1909; Sakaide, Kagawa, Japan
- Died: September 29, 1986 (aged 77); Hiroshima, Japan
- Education: Kwansei Gakuin University; Emory University
- Occupation: Methodist minister
- Spouse: Chisa Tanimoto (d. 2011)
- Children: 5 (including Koko)

Kiyoshi Tanimoto (谷本 清, Tanimoto Kiyoshi; June 27, 1909 – September 28, 1986) was a Japanese Methodist minister famous for his humanitarian work for the Hiroshima Maidens. Tanimoto was a U.S educated Methodist minister who moved to Hiroshima with his wife during the midst of World War II. He survived the atomic bombings of Hiroshima and Nagasaki, and was one of the six Hiroshima survivors whose experience of the bomb and later life are portrayed in John Hersey's book Hiroshima.

== Biography ==
Kiyoshi Tanimoto was born on June 27, 1909 in Sakaide, Kagawa Prefecture and was the youngest of eight children. Kiyoshi was raised Buddhist, but was introduced to Christianity by Bertha Starkey during a visit to Korea. Following his visit, his mother suddenly died, solidifying his decision to convert to Christianity. His father was greatly upset by the move, and removed him from the family register, refusing to talk to him. Tanimoto studied Christianity at the Kwansei Gakuin University before being awarded a scholarship to attend the Candler School of Theology at Emory University in Atlanta, Georgia. He was briefly able to talk to his father before moving to Atlanta in 1937 and becoming an ordained minister after graduation. He served in churches in California and Okinawa.

He returned to Japan and married Chisa Tanimoto, and relocated to Hiroshima in 1943, in the midst of World War II. Despite the city being relatively unscathed during the war, Tanimoto felt uneasy and thought something big was going to happen to the city after hearing frequent air raid sirens. On the morning of August 6, 1945, the United States dropped Little Boy on Hiroshima during the Atomic bombings of Hiroshima and Nagasaki. Tanimoto was outside moving furniture with a friend, and after seeing a bright flash of light, he sought cover between two large rocks. Tanimoto, unhurt, ran into the city and found his family safe. He quickly put himself to work aiding others by bringing water, carrying them to safety, and if there was nothing else he could do, reading them verses from the Bible in Japanese.

Following the release of John Hersey's book Hiroshima, and Tanimoto's personal accounts about his experience, Tanimoto started to gain recognition for it, and went on a 15-month U.S tour, giving speeches in 31 states. During his time he met prominent figures such as Nobel Prize-winning author Pearl S. Buck and political journalist Norman Cousins. These meetings led to the establishment of the Moral Adoption Program, which facilitated Americans to offer financial support and send presents to orphans whose parents died during the bombings. After his time in the U.S and giving 582 lectures, he then returned to Japan. On May 11, 1955, believing he was there for a news interview, Tanimoto unwittingly appeared on a television program popular in the United States at that time, This Is Your Life, where his experience was highly dramatized with sound effects, dramatic music, and actual footage of the city being destroyed in the bombing, as he was asked to walk the studio audience and viewers through the events. He, his wife, and his four children, including his daughter and eventual peace activist, Koko Kondo, were placed in the uncomfortable position of meeting with Captain Robert A. Lewis, the copilot of the Enola Gay, which dropped Little Boy on Hiroshima. At the end, the audience was encouraged to donate to the Hiroshima Maidens. The episode would later be described as "[exemplifying] a number of the ways in which America comes to terms with...its responsibility for Hiroshima. The first of these ways is Disneyfication, the tendency to view Hiroshima as a dramatic spectacle, an exercise in special effects: the ticking clock, the rolling kettledrums, and the image of the mushroom cloud produce an emotional frisson, and little more than that."

Due to his public fundraising activities, he developed an unwanted reputation as a publicity seeker and attracted the attention of the U.S and Japanese authorities as a potential "anti-nuke trouble-maker". In 1972, he was interviewed by Thames Television, for the 24th episode of the acclaimed British documentary television series, The World at War.

He died of pneumonia as a result of liver failure in Hiroshima on September 29, 1986.

The annual Kiyoshi Tanimoto Peace Prize is named after him.

== See also ==
- Humanitarianism
- Humanitarian aid
- Peace education
- Philanthropy
- Religion and peacebuilding
- World peace
