= Effects of the Cold War =

The effects of the Cold War on nation-states were numerous both economically and socially until its subsequent century. For example, in Russia, military spending was cut dramatically after 1991, which caused a decline from the Soviet Union's military-industrial sector. Such a dismantling left millions of employees throughout the former Soviet Union unemployed, which affected Russia's economy and military.

After Russia embarked on several economic reformations in the 1990s, it underwent a financial crisis. The Russian recession was more oppressive than the one experienced by United States and Germany during the Great Depression. Although Russian living standards worsened overall after the Cold War, the economy held an overwhelming growth after 1998. In early 2005, it became known that the economy had returned to its 1989 levels of per capita GDP.

The Cold War has continued to influence global politics after its end. The dissolution of the Soviet Union ended the Cold War and led to world that is widely considered as uni polar, with the United States being the sole remaining hyperpower, but many other rising powers hold great influence in the world and are certainly superpowers. The Cold War defined the political role of the United States after World War II. By 1989, the United States had military alliances with 50 countries and 1.5 million troops posted abroad in 117 countries, which institutionalized a global commitment to a huge permanent peacetime military-industrial complex and the large-scale military funding of science. In addition, the US led to the permanent creation of Peacetime Defense and the armaments industry, which was referred to in the farewell address of President Dwight Eisenhower.

Military expenditures by the US during the Cold War were estimated to have been roughly 8-9 trillion dollars, and nearly 100,000 Americans died during the Korean War and the Vietnam War.

In addition to the loss of life by uniformed soldiers, millions died in the superpowers' proxy wars around the globe, most notably in Southeast Asia. Most proxy wars and subsidies for local conflicts ended along with the Cold War. The incidence of interstate wars, ethnic wars, revolutionary wars, as well as refugees and disagreements between the leaders of the nations that were affected by the warfare, declined sharply after the Cold War.

The legacy of the Cold War is not easily erased, as many of the economic and social tensions that were exploited to fuel competition in parts of the Third World have remained acute. The breakdown of state control in a number of areas formerly ruled by communist governments has produced new civil and ethnic conflicts, particularly in the former Yugoslavia. In Eastern Europe, the end of the Cold War has ushered in an era of economic growth and a large increase in the number of liberal democracies, but in other parts of the world, such as Afghanistan, independence was accompanied by state failure.

With the fall of the Berlin Wall, the annulment of the Warsaw Pact, and the dissolution of the Soviet Union, the Cold War was officially terminated, particularly in the deployment of nuclear-armed ballistic missiles and defensive systems. Because there was no formalized treaty ending the Cold War, the former superpowers have continued to various degrees to maintain and even to improve or modify existing nuclear weapons and delivery systems. Moreover, other nations that have not been previously acknowledged as nuclear states have developed and tested nuclear-explosive devices.

The risk of nuclear and radiological terrorism by possible subnational organizations or individuals is now a concern, but no incidents of nuclear terrorism has occurred yet because of the efforts of counterterrorist organisations.

== Radiation legacies ==
US radiation warning symbol

The military and non-military exploitation of nuclear fission caused the Cold War to bring forth some significant involuntary exposures to high-level radiation. The nuclear bombings of Hiroshima and Nagasaki caused large-scale destruction led to acute and lingering radiation throughout the affected areas. Scientists, technicians, military personnel, civilians, and animals were exposed to radiation above the normal background levels as a result of decades of nuclear production, experimentation, and testing. In addition, several significant nuclear and radiation accidents occurred at military and civilian nuclear reactors and facilities. The accidents exposed the public to above-normal radiation and also killed workers.

The exposures did not stop the Americans and the Soviets from creating large numbers of missiles and nuclear weapons.

Many nuclear legacies can be identified from the Cold War, such as the availability of new technologies for nuclear power and energy. The legacies created great tensions between the superpowers, especially since world hegemony was disputed between both of them.

Environmental remediation, industrial production, research science, and technology development have benefited from the carefully-managed application of radiation and other nuclear processes.

== Security legacies ==
The immense power of nuclear weapons has caused countries to inherit substantial responsibilities in protecting and stabilizing their nuclear forces.

Since the Cold War, nuclear weapons and their delivery systems have been immensely secured and protected for fear that such weapons of mass destruction would be stolen. However, many nuclear weapons have been lost in accidents and are still unaccounted for. Nuclear facilities and devices, such as reactors and propulsion systems, were safeguarded. An appropriate continuing level of security remains necessary in all lifecycle phases, from production to decommissioning, as the entire military nuclear infrastructure requires protection, which requires a commensurate allocation of funding.

Having once had widespread overseas nuclear bases and facilities, both the United States and Russia have inherited particular responsibilities and costs. Moreover, all nuclear states had developed not only production and service facilities but also sometimes extensive military staging and storage facilities.

World inventories of weapons-grade fissile materials are substantial, which is much greater than that needed for military purposes. Until the materials can be demilitarized, they need to be securely safeguarded to prevent deliberate, accidental, or unauthorized nuclear devastation. Moreover, terrorists and hackers have continued to interfere with nuclear stability and confidence.

== Military legacies ==
Internal national security military postures still dominate behavior among sovereign nations, and as the former superpowers did not formally consummate the end of Cold War military equipment, strategic and tactical nuclear and conventional forces remain at levels that are comparatively high for a peacetime environment. Localized conflicts and tensions replaced the former bilateral nuclear confrontation. As a lingering result, large inventories of nuclear weapons and facilities remain stabilized. Some facilities are being recycled, dismantled, or recovered. Valuable substances as well as some chemical and biological weapons that were developed during the Cold War are still in existence, but many are being demilitarized.

Military policies and strategies are slowly being modified to reflect the increasing interval without major confrontation and because of the large extent of inventories on weapons, fissile materials, and rapid-response delivery systems. However, a mutual danger exists for accidental, misjudged, or miscalculated incidents or warfare.

There is a general trend among former Cold War states of a slow nuclear disarmament. A few other nations, however, have attempted or succeeded in carrying out nuclear-explosive tests and so have created their own nuclear deterrence.

During the Cold War, an international fabric of arms-control constraints evolved, and much of them were carried over as a beneficial heritage with institutional mechanisms for multilateral or international function and verification.

== Institutional legacies ==
Aside from the tangible measures of national defense, such as standing military and security forces and hardware, various institutional structures of government and functionality have had less to do directly with military or security factors but more to do with underlying public attitudes and risks. The institutional structures and perceptions have had their own challenges and adjustments after the Cold War ended.

Strong impressions were made and continue to effect the national psyche as a result of close brushes with all-out nuclear warfare. In some cases, that has resulted in an aversion to warfare, but in other cases, that has to callousness regarding nuclear threats. Peaceful applications of nuclear energy received a stigma that is still too difficult to exercise as it heightens the fear of nuclear risk, which can result in resistance to military drawdown.

Public impressions and insecurities gained during the Cold War carried over to the peacetime environment. The new peaceful era created a territorial expansion of democratic capitalism, which had an open invitation to proclaim the obsolescence of the war itself. Several countries built specific institutions of democracy in postcommunist areas with the wide belief that it would favor peaceful conflict resolution, as wars would not occur in democracies. That exacerbated the idea of democracy being peaceful, which surged across the nations affected by the Cold War and became a popular opinion for international relation experts since peace lay in the political strength of democracy and popular sovereignty.

After the tensions of the Cold War diminished, the United Nations commenced an extensive journey, marked by the sole objective to analyze, reflect, and debate in detail issues related to the advocates of human rights and to the creation of the construction of a perfect society that would live in a culture involving peace around foreign nations, a utopia-like fantasy.

With the end of communism after the Soviet Union collapsed from its economic weaknesses, German unification and even the dissolution of Czechoslovakia, historical events occurred with immense speed. Therefore, the end of the 20th century was marked as the start of widespread peace in Europe, other Western countries, and beyond.

== Economic legacies ==
After the end of World War II in 1945, Europe faced great difficulties in achieving an economic, political, and social recovery. Although historians and scholars maintain different positions regarding the causes of the development of the Cold War and its effects, all concur that the tensions between the superpowers had been accumulating, which were the spark that ignited the flame. Such tensions were described by the immense separation between the capitalist and communist countries. The communists had an economy planned by the state, and the capitalists pursued the idea of a free-market economy.

The Potsdam Agreement divided Germany into two large blocks, each led by the most powerful nations of the moment: the Soviet Union, the United Kingdom, France and the United States. The first three represented the Western Bloc and the capitalist system, and the Soviet Union led the Eastern Bloc and expanded its communist system. That caused a huge fiscal mortgage to be placed on many domestic economies, as financial obligations included those that were necessary to avoid further dislocations during the change from a wartime footing to a peacetime environment. The most important social causes are caused by economic influence, which led to national military establishments and the reconfiguration of alliances. Highly-dependent institutional frameworks were restructured, and new obligations were acquired by nations that had been bystanders to the east–west confrontation.

== Psychological legacies ==
The Cold War led to some less-than-desired psychological effects. The United States and Russia and, to a greater extent, the world, lived in fear of impending nuclear doom. The psyche of US citizens during the Cold War was unstable due to the overwhelming sense of fear, powerlessness, and uncertainty about the future. That is evident in adolescent children of the 6th, 7th, and 8th grades, as polled in a study conducted by Daniel J. Christie and C. Patricia Hanley. The study measured the general anxiety surrounding the Cold War and the thought of impending doom by administering a test in which the students would rate how they felt on certain issues from a scale of 1 to 5, 1 being never describing the individual and 5 being always describing the individual. This study found that 85% of the adolescents reported feeling powerless, 90% reported feeling uncertainty about the future, and 88% feeling fearful. The study was very influential as to seeing inside the mind of the youth, which would go on to become adults during the Cold War. Many of them were so uncertain about the future and even if they would have a future to grow up in. Additionally, another paper, published by Sibylle K. Escalona, analyzed the psychological development of children during the Cold War. Children see and have "somewhat" of a grasp on reality. One quote from the study from Escalona is revealing: "During the sixties we conducted a study where we asked children about the future in ten years while giving no reference to the bomb..... we found that 99% of the 2,000 children polled in the study mentioned the bomb in some capacity." Additionally, Escalona made another point that children are not just little brainless beings that run amok: "To children, as the rest of us, nuclear danger is a part of the total social atmosphere." The impending fear of a nuclear war was ever present in the mindset and the everyday social anxieties of US citizens during the Cold War. The Cold War led to not only economic, societal, and militaristic changes but also psychological changes that shaped a generation.

== Sources ==
- Alexander DeVolpi (2009): Nuclear Insights: The Cold War Legacy, Volume 2: Nuclear Threats and Prospects (A Knowledgeable Assessment)
- Thad Dunning (2004): Conditioning the Effects of Aid: Cold War Politics, Donor Credibility, and Democracy in Africa.
- Petra Goedde (2019): The Politics of Peace: A Global Cold War History. Oxford University Press.
- Aldo Marchesi (2019): Latin America's Radical Left: Rebellion and Cold War in the Global 1960s
- Andrew Sumner (2016): Global Poverty: Deprivation, Distribution, and Development Since the Cold War.
