= Hiroshima Maidens =

Group of Japanese women disfigured by the atomic bombing of Hiroshima

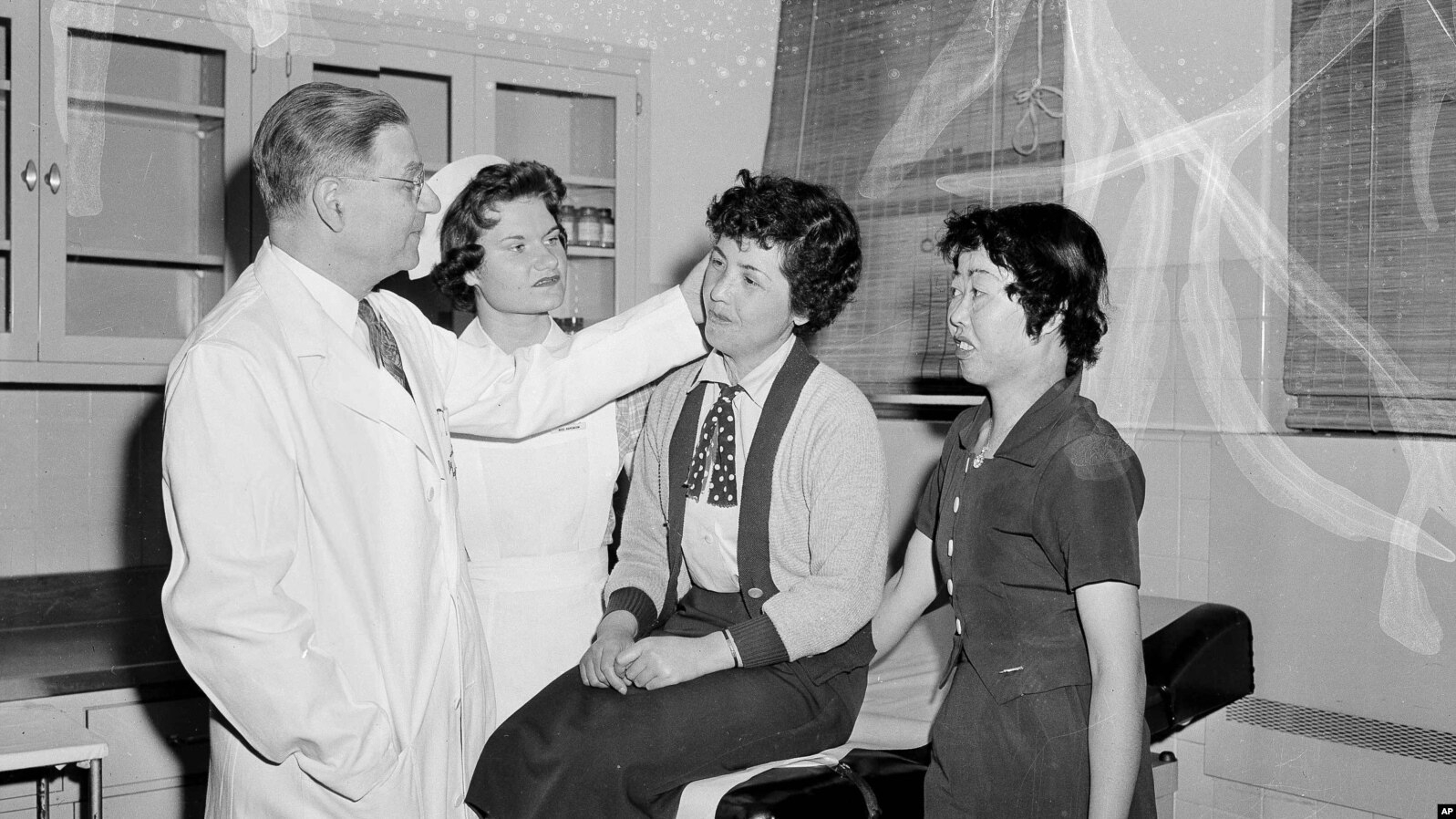
Hiroshima Maidens Toyoko Minowa (箕輪 豊子) and Michiko Sako (迫 道子) being examined by Dr. Arthur Barsky in Mount Sinai Hospital, New York, 1955

The Hiroshima Maidens (Japanese: 原爆乙女 (Genbaku Otome); lit. 'atomic bomb maidens') were a group of 25 Japanese women who were disfigured by the atomic bombing of Hiroshima and subsequently went on a highly publicized journey to obtain reconstructive surgery in the United States. Originating from a support group organized by Methodist minister Kiyoshi Tanimoto, the Maidens attracted widespread media attention in Japan, with some undergoing surgeries in Tokyo and Osaka. After these surgeries failed, Tanimoto worked with the editor of The Saturday Review of Literature, Norman Cousins, to bring the Maidens to the United States for surgery. They traveled there in 1955.

While in the United States, a team of surgeons at Mount Sinai Hospital in New York performed 138 operations on the Maidens while they stayed at the Pendle Hill Quaker Center for Study and Contemplation and with Quaker host families. One Maiden, Tomoko Nakabayashi, died during surgery. The Maidens returned to Japan in 1956 to mixed reception from the Japanese people. Some viewed them as tools of Cold War propaganda and cultural assimilation, while others praised them for improving Japan–United States relations. After their experience in the United States, the Maidens were portrayed in various dramatic productions and in the 1988 movie Hiroshima Maiden.

== Origins ==
=== Raising support in Japan ===
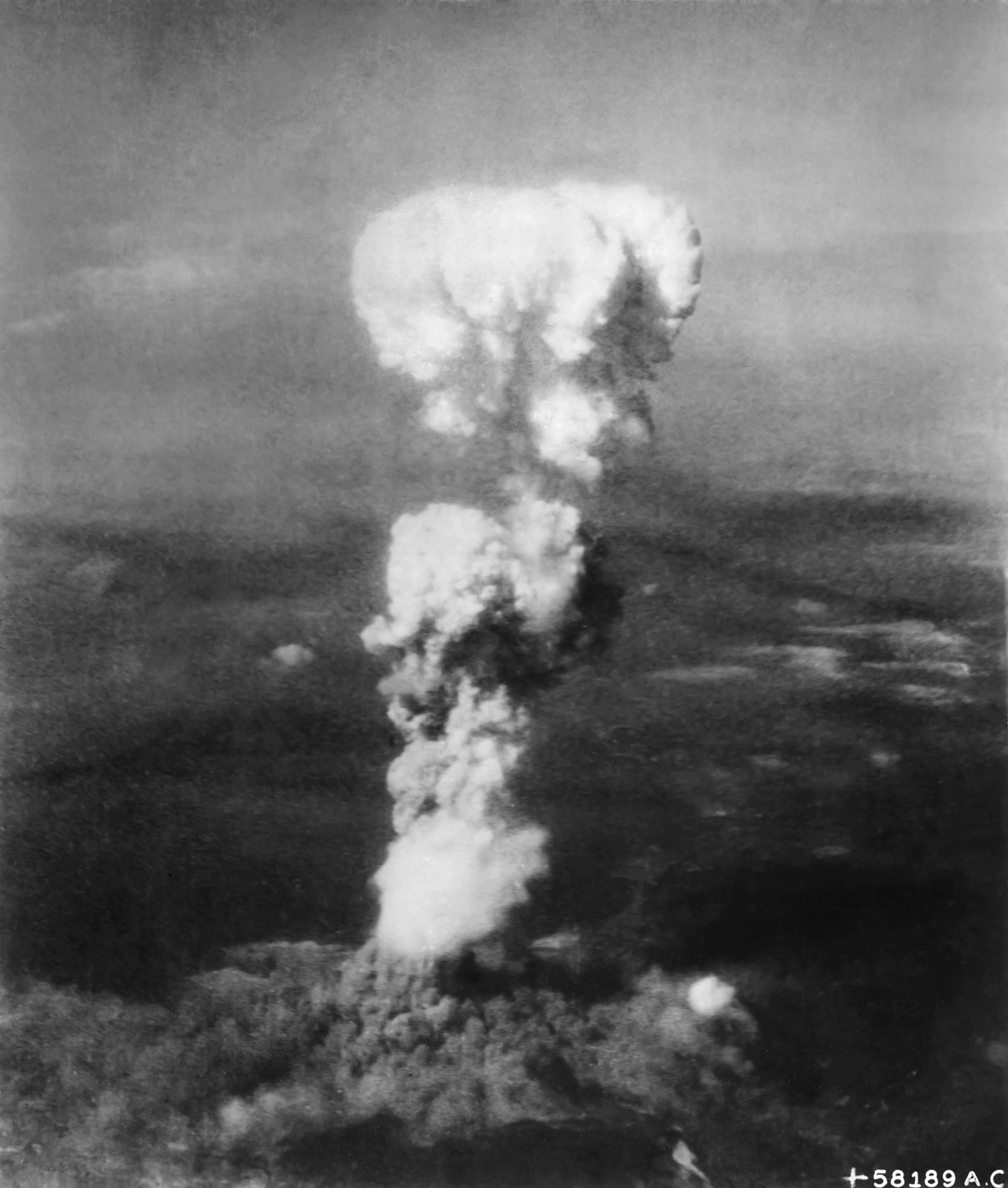
The atomic bombing of Hiroshima

On 6 August 1945, an American plane dropped an atomic bomb on Hiroshima, Japan. Survivors of the bombing called themselves hibakusha. Numerous people experienced deep flash burns from heat rays, as well as hair loss and purpura from the radiation. Many of the flash burns developed into keloid scars. Methodist minister Kiyoshi Tanimoto, inspired by hibakusha Shigeko Niimoto, helped create a support group consisting of about 40 unmarried hibakusha women in his church basement. Radiation sickness sufferers were stigmatized in Japanese society, and hibakusha's injuries were often seen as shameful. Many of the women had been hidden away by their families, who feared that their disfigurements would damage their family's reputation.

Tanimoto faced resistance when he tried to seek medical care for the women in Hiroshima, where they were known as "Tanimoto's Keloid Girls". However, with the assistance of a journalist for the widely-circulated Yomiuri Shimbun, he took several of the women on an all-expenses-paid trip to Tokyo, Japan, where they drew the attention of the press, who called them the "Genbaku Otome" (lit. 'atomic bomb maidens'). As part of this trip, the women visited Sugamo Prison. While there, they met with Japanese war criminals, expressing sympathy for them and claiming that while they once held a grudge against them, since so much time had passed since the war ended, they had "[begun] to realize that the war criminals' plight was the same as theirs". This visit proved controversial, with fellow hibakusha Kiyoshi Kikkawa, who was also present for the visit, finding the women's behavior "disturb[ing]". Soon after, some of the women returned to Tokyo to undergo reconstructive surgery. Others were treated at the Osaka University Medical Center. These surgeries, undertaken by Japanese doctors inexperienced in reconstructive operations, failed to achieve the desired results and in some cases exacerbated the women's injuries.

=== Raising support in America ===
In 1951, Tanimoto began working with the editor of The Saturday Review of Literature, Norman Cousins, to promote the women's cause, convincing him that the best course of action for the women was to take them to the United States to receive surgery there. It was Cousins who first used the English name "Hiroshima Maidens" for the women. Cousins consulted Dr. William Hitzig, his personal physician at Mount Sinai Hospital in New York, about the feasibility of reconstructive surgery, asking him to assemble a team of doctors to perform them. Then he arranged for lawyer Alfred Rose to pay for hospitalization costs. Due to their pacifist beliefs, Cousins asked the Quakers to provide lodging for the maidens. They agreed to volunteer their homes as "retreats" for the Maidens. Activists Bill and Yuri Kochiyama also raised support for the project in the New York Japanese American community, and it was arranged for Japanese American Helen Yokoyama to accompany the Maidens to the United States as their "den mother".

With the aid of Kiyoshi Togasaki, the editor of The Japan Times, Cousins also convinced general John E. Hull to provide air transportation for the Maidens. While the United States Department of State initially opposed the project, fearing that it would be interpreted as an admission of wrongdoing on the part of the United States for dropping the atomic bomb, they eventually acquiesced to it after Marvin Green of the Hiroshima Peace Center convinced them that it would have a positive effect on Japan–United States relations. 43 women were initially selected as candidates to travel to the United States, and when Hitzig and his team traveled to Japan to perform preliminary examinations, it was determined that 25 met the surgery criteria. The Maidens left for New York in April 1955.

== Time in America ==
=== Arrival and press coverage ===
On the way to New York, the Maidens briefly stopped in Hawaii, where local Japanese American residents welcomed them with leis. They stayed in the officer's quarters at Hickam Air Force Base and took a sightseeing tour of the island. They then flew to Travis Air Force Base in California, where they were greeted by the California Japanese Benevolent Society and a group of women representing the Northern California Peace Council, who gave a speech protesting thermonuclear weapons. Finally, they arrived in New York on 9 May 1955. Upon arrival, members of the New York press rushed the Maidens, angering Cousins, who nearly entered into a physical altercation with a photographer from the New York World-Telegram and The Sun. Afterward, they were escorted by the New York City Police Department to a welcome party hosted at Hitzig's five-story townhouse. After that, they were taken to the Pendle Hill Quaker Center in Pennsylvania.

Descriptions of the Maidens in the press emphasized the severity of their injuries, connecting them to the atomic bomb using epithets like "bomb-scarred", "A-scarred", and "Hiroshima-scarred". This press coverage, combined with New York screenings of the 1953 film Hiroshima, led the State Department to issue an internal memo stating that "helping victims of misfortune is a very worthwhile endeavor but every effort should be made to keep the project involving the Hiroshima girls from stirring up propaganda against nuclear weapons".

On 11 May, Tanimoto and several of the Maidens flew to Los Angeles to appear on an episode of the television show This Is Your Life. Tanimoto, who had been told that he was going to be interviewed about the Maidens, was surprised by the format of the show: a dramatic retelling of his life featuring sound effects, an orchestral score, and guest appearances from important figures from his past. At the end of the segment, two of the Maidens, Tadako Emori and Toyoko Minowa, appeared and thanked the people of the United States for their assistance, though they were hidden behind screens so as not to "embarrass" them.

=== Surgeries ===
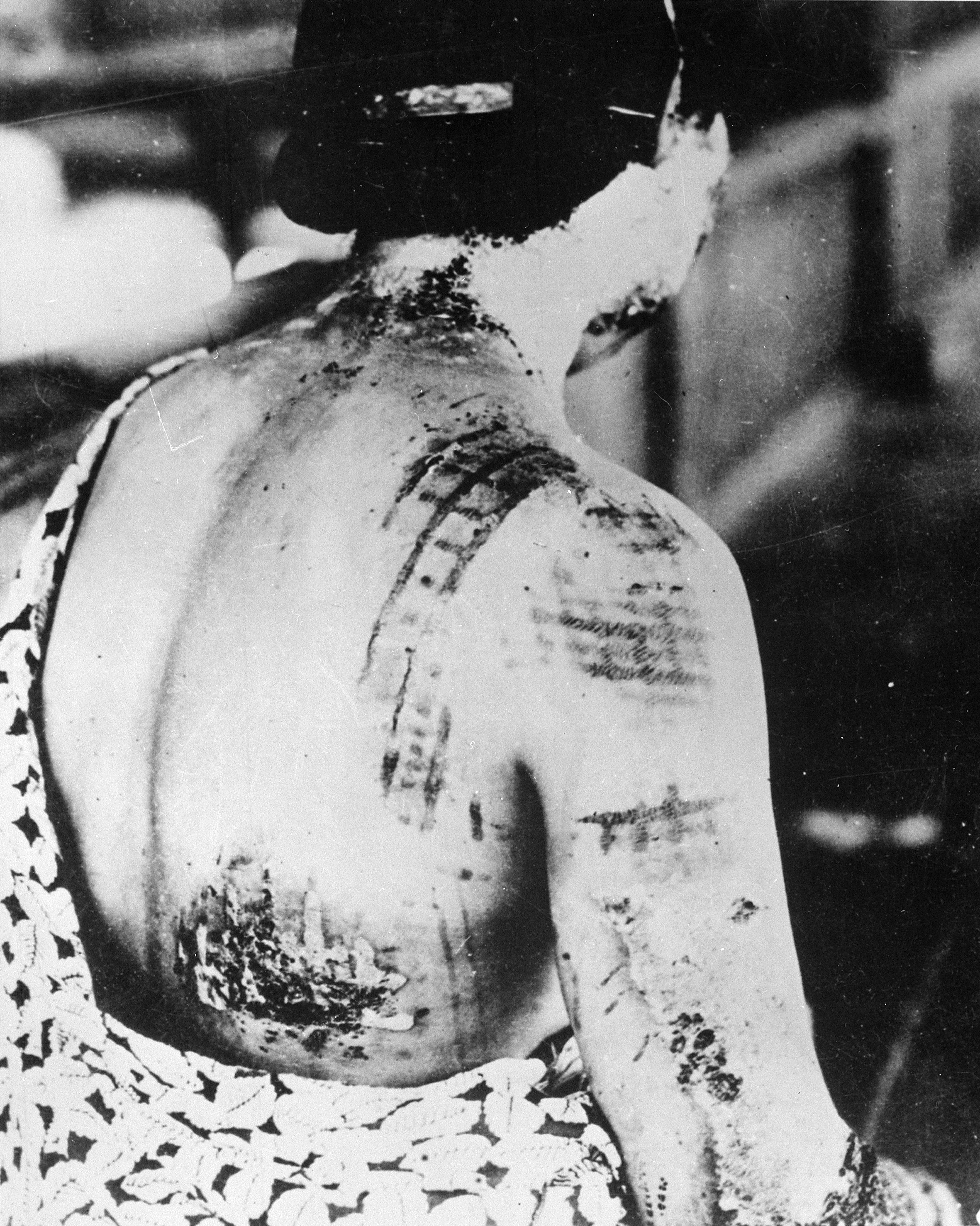
A Hiroshiman hibakusha with symptomatic nuclear burn scars

The Maidens' surgical team included Hitzig; doctors Arthur Barsky, Bernard Simon, and Sidney Kahn; and three Japanese doctors who had traveled with the Maidens to assist with the operations. The first four operations performed by the team included the removal of a keloidal adhesion from one woman's neck, which allowed her to move her head freely; the removal of a scar from another woman's right hand; the grafting of hair-bearing skin from behind one woman's ear to form a new set of eyebrows; and the grafting of a piece of skin from another woman's arm to repair her damaged eyelid. The woman whose eyelid was repaired, Mitsuko Kuramoto, was the subject of rumors, with many claiming that her eyelid had been destroyed entirely and that the exposed eye wept uncontrollably as a result. This story was rebutted by surgeon Bernard Simon, who clarified that a person without an eyelid would probably go blind within a few days. More surgeries followed, most involving pedicle grafts. (Note: A type of graft that involves moving healthy tissue to an injured area from other parts of the body.)

After each surgery, the Maidens recuperated at the homes of various Quaker host families in Connecticut, New Jersey, and New York. These host families bought the Maidens American clothing and encouraged them to participate in activities at local educational institutions, with many taking classes in cosmetology, nursing, painting, and secretarial work. The Maidens' host families were described by Cousins as their "new parents", while some members of the press portrayed the matrons of these families as their "new American mothers". (Note: Chung Simpson criticizes these portrayals in her book An Absent Presence: Japanese Americans in Postwar American Culture, 1945-1960, describing them as "anecdotes that [are] often blatantly maudlin sketches of unbounded devotion" and arguing that they fail to adequately represent the roles that Japanese Americans like Yuri Kochiyama and Helen Yokoyama played in the Maidens' lives.)

As part of a plan to study their mental health, Hitzig brought in a psychiatrist to assess the Maidens without informing them ahead of time. This decision was criticized by Yokoyama, Barsky, and Quaker representative Ida Day, who argued that the planned study would be exploitative. It was ultimately discontinued.

The surgeries were originally scheduled to conclude within a year of the Maidens' arrival. However, because the number of beds at the hospital was insufficient, the timeline was extended into the summer of 1956. In order to accommodate the original timeline, it was determined that half of the Maidens would return to Japan while the rest would remain in the United States to complete their surgeries. Among those selected to return was Tomoko Nakabayashi, (Note: Various given names are used for Nakabayashi in different accounts. Barker, Chung Simpson, and Jacobs write her name as Tomoko. However, Serlin writes her name as Tomako and Phu writes her name as Tamako.) who requested that the team perform one last procedure on her: the removal of a scar on the inner part of her forearm. Barsky assented to the procedure, which took place on 24 May 1956. Complications during the surgery caused Nakabayashi to experience heart failure, and she died in the evening. Her death received little attention in American media but was heavily covered by some Japanese newspapers, which claimed that the Maidens were being used as "guinea pigs" for American experimentation.

The first group of Maidens returned to Japan in June 1956. The second group returned in November. In all, 138 surgeries were performed on the Maidens. Their reception in Japan was mixed, with some viewing them as "victims of Cold War propaganda" whose surgeries were undertaken to hide the damage inflicted by the atomic bombs, others viewing them as "victims of cultural assimilation", and still others viewing them with sympathy, believing that their experience could help to connect the Japanese people with the people of the United States.

== Lives after reconstruction ==
After returning, a number of the Maidens married and became mothers. One, Masako Wada, became a social worker, initially finding employment at Tanimoto's Blind Children's Home before becoming a caseworker at a home for elderly hibakusha in Hiroshima. Another, Hideko Hirata, also became a social worker, advocating on behalf of burakumin (lit. 'hamlet/village people'). Others, such as Emiko Takemoto, Hiroko Tasaka, and Toyoko Morita, gravitated toward design, with Morita attending the Parsons School of Design and later becoming a well-known fashion designer in Japan. Still others took professional positions as switchboard operators and secretaries or found employment as manual laborers. Niimoto, who had inspired the creation of the group, moved to America to live with Cousins. She subsequently moved in with a Japanese American family, working for some time as a nurse at Mount Sinai Morningside hospital in New York and then, after the birth of a child, in various freelance positions, including as a home-care nurse. In 1980, she testified before the United States Senate about the health impacts of nuclear weapons.

== Legacy ==
Pictures of three of the Maidens appear without credit in the book Principles and Practice of Plastic Surgery, written by Barsky and co-edited by Kahn and Simon, to demonstrate the effects of radiation burns. They are also the subject of the 1984 dance drama No More Hiroshimas—A Lone Star Shinning. Written by Hideo Kimura and scored by Shigeo Tohno, the drama portrays the experiences of hibakusha on the day that Hiroshima was bombed. A Maiden named "Hideko" appears in the play Gretty Good Time, written by John Beluso, and the Maidens are also mentioned in the play No One as Nasty, written by Susan Nussbaum:

...and the Hiroshima maidens got burned and disfigured, there's a word, "disfigured", because of, why? Because—They were in Hiroshima. They were too close to avoid the fire, too far to be consumed...

The Maidens are also portrayed in the 1988 movie Hiroshima Maiden, which depicted a hibakusha woman staying with an American family. In 1994, poet Daniel James Sundahl released a book titled Hiroshima Maidens: Imaginary Translations from the Japanese, which recounts the psychological impact the bombing of Hiroshima might have had on the Maidens.

=== Interpretations and criticism ===
Discussions of the Hiroshima Maidens project have centered on American exceptionalism, American culpability for dropping the atomic bomb, and interpretations of the Maidens' femininity. In 1985, Rodney Barker released a biography of the Hiroshima Maidens. This biography, described by historian Caroline Chung Simpson as "the most comprehensive story of the 1955 project", was criticized by New York Times critic Taylor Branch for dismissing Japanese culture while praising "American values". Barker responded by claiming that his book was "no comment on cultural superiority" but that it did show how certain aspects of American culture helped the Maidens prosper as humans. According to Chung Simpson, Barker saw the Hiroshima Maidens project as a "story of love and compassion" that showed how people from different backgrounds could come together in "sacrifice and generosity". Chung Simpson herself rejects this premise, instead arguing that the project's primary allure was in its affirmation of "American domesticity" during the difficult postwar period.

Academic David Serlin argues that supporters of the Hiroshima Maidens viewed them through "Western paradigms of beauty" and womanhood, suggesting that their public treatment allowed everyday people to see both the promise and "horror" of medical science. Later, in a 2010 paper, historian Robert Jacobs argues that the project allowed American media to portray America as a "healer" of atomic bomb survivors rather than as the source of their injuries. In Jacobs's view, this narrative reinforced the representations of American "technological prowess" and goodwill that were used to justify dropping atomic bombs on Japanese citizens in the first place. He also argues that the project ignored male hibakusha, claiming that if young Japanese men were included in the project, it would have invoked unwanted memories of Japanese soldiers, thus making them unfit for American generosity.

Historian Naoko Shibusawa claims that the use of maternal language when describing the Maidens made both American aid and American authority seem natural while shifting the responsibility for caring for hibakusha to private groups rather than the US government. According to historian Naoko Wake, the femininity of the Maidens made them "worthy recipients of care" despite the US government's refusal to recognize their right to treatment officially. She further claims that the Maidens' injuries served as a public spectacle and that they were "quickly replaced" by Americans who were afraid that they would become victims of atomic warfare next.

== List ==
- Atsuko Yamamoto (Note: Barker and Wahrman list Yamamoto's given name as Atsuko while Serlin lists it as Atsue.)
- Chieko Kimura
- Emiko Takemoto
- Hideko Hirata
- Hideko Sumimura
- Hiroko Tasaka
- Keiko Kawasaki
- Masako Wada
- Michiko Sako
- Michiko Yamaoka
- Michiyo Zomen
- Misako Kannabe
- Mitsuko Kuramoto
- Motoko Yamashita
- Shigeko Niimoto
- Suzue Oshima
- Tadako Emori
- Takako Harada
- Tazuko Shibata
- Terue Takeda
- Tomoko Nakabayashi
- Toyoko Minowa
- Toyoko Morita
- Yoshie Enokawa
- Yoshie Harada

== See also ==
- Sadako Sasaki
- White Light/Black Rain: The Destruction of Hiroshima and Nagasaki (2007). documentary by Steven Okazaki, HBO, August 6, 2007.

== Sources ==
- Barker, Rodney (1985a). The Hiroshima Maidens: A Story of Courage, Compassion, and Survival. New York: Viking. ISBN 0-670-80609-9.
- Barker, Rodney (1985b). "Hiroshima Maidens in America". The New York Times.
- Branch, Taylor (1985). "Symbols of Guilt and Generosity". The New York Times.
- Chung Simpson, Caroline (2002). An Absent Presence: Japanese Americans in Postwar American Culture, 1945-1960. Durham: Duke University Press. ISBN 978-0-8223-2746-2.
- Cousins, Norman (1967). "Hiroshima Maidens" (PDF). Hibakusha Stories. Youth Arts New York.
- Dunning, Jennifer (1984). "Dance: Hiroshima Story". The New York Times.
- Fujino, Diane C. (2005). Heartbeat of Struggle: The Revolutionary Life of Yuri Kochiyama. Minneapolis: University of Minnesota Press. ISBN 978-0-8166-4593-0. OCLC 57069512.
- Jacobs, Robert (2010). "Reconstructing the Perpetrator's Soul by Reconstructing the Victim's Body: The Portrayal of the 'Hiroshima Maidens' by the Mainstream Media in the United States". Intersections. Canberra: Australian National University.
- Kennedy, Janice (1988). "Wonderworks' Hiroshima Maiden focuses on survivor of atomic blast: [Final Edition]". The Gazette. Montreal. pp. T11. ProQuest 431627702.
- Kort, Michael (2007). The Columbia Guide to Hiroshima and the Bomb. New York; Chichester: Columbia University Press. ISBN 9780231527583.
- Lewis, Victoria Ann (1998). "The Dramaturgy of Disability". Michigan Quarterly Review. XXXVII (3). Ann Arbor: Michigan Publishing, University of Michigan Library. ISSN 1558-7266.
- Meginnis, Mike (2014). "The Atomic Bombing of Hiroshima is The Stuff of Reality TV". Electric Literature.
- Miyamoto, Yuki (2015). "Unbearable light/ness of the bombing: normalizing violence and banalizing the horror of the atomic bomb experiences". Critical Military Studies. 1 (2). Taylor & Francis: 116–130. doi:10.1080/23337486.2015.1050268. ISSN 2333-7486.
- Phu, Thy (2012). Picturing Model Citizens: Civility in Asian American Visual Culture. Philadelphia: Temple University Press. ISBN 978-1-4399-0721-4.
- Sandomir, Richard (28 December 2024). "Shigeko Sasamori, Hiroshima Survivor Who Preached Peace, Dies at 92". The New York Times.
- Serlin, David (2004). Replaceable you: Engineering the Body in Postwar America. Chicago: University of Chicago Press. ISBN 978-0-226-74883-2.
- Shibusawa, Naoko (2021). America's Geisha Ally: Reimagining the Japanese Enemy. Cambridge, MA: Harvard University Press. ISBN 978-0-674-04356-5.
- Tomonaga, Masao (2019). "The Atomic Bombings of Hiroshima and Nagasaki: A Summary of the Human Consequences, 1945-2018, and Lessons for Homo sapiens to End the Nuclear Weapon Age". Journal for Peace and Nuclear Disarmament. 2 (2). Taylor & Francis: 491–517. doi:10.1080/25751654.2019.1681226. ISSN 2575-1654.
- Wahrman, Aron D. (2020). "Caring for the Hiroshima Maidens". ACS.
- Wake, Naoko (2022). "The 'Hiroshima Maidens' on Different Shores: Decentralising Scarred Japanese Femininity in the A-Bomb Victimhood". Gender & History. 34 (1). Wiley-Blackwell: 201–221. doi:10.1111/1468-0424.12527. ISSN 0953-5233.
