= Hiroshima (disambiguation) =

Hiroshima is the capital of Hiroshima Prefecture and the largest city in the Chūgoku region, Japan.

Hiroshima most often also refers to:

- Atomic bombings of Hiroshima and Nagasaki
- Hiroshima Prefecture

Hiroshima may also refer to:

- Hiroshima (also Sanuki Hiroshima), one of Japan's Shiwaku Islands
- Hiroshima (book), a 1946 book written by John Hersey
- Hiroshima (1953 film), a 1953 Japanese film about the bombing of Hiroshima and its aftermath
- Hiroshima (1995 film), a 1995 Japanese-Canadian film about the bombing of Hiroshima
- Hiroshima: BBC History of World War II, a 2005 television documentary
- Hiroshima (band), an American jazz band formed in 1974
- Hiroshima (painting), a 1961 painting by Yves Klein
- "Hiroshima" (song), a song by Dave Morgan and recorded by Wishful Thinking in 1971 and Sandra in 1990
- Hiroshima – Rising from the Abyss, a 2001 album by Toshiko Akiyoshi - Lew Tabackin Big Band
- "Hiroshima", a song by Ben Folds
- "Hiroshima", a song by Bjorn Afzelius
- Hiroshima (Mazda factory), an automobile manufacturing complex in Aki, Hiroshima
