= Toshiko Saiki =

Japanese peace activist (1919–2017)

- 佐伯敏子
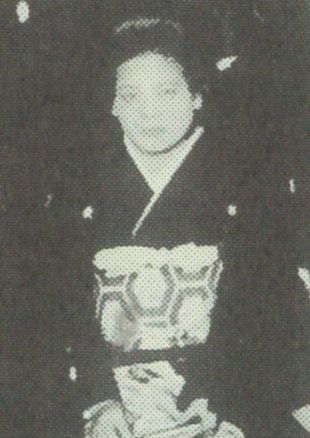
- A photo of Saiki taken before 1945
- Born: Toshiko Mosoji; 24 December 1919; Hiroshima, Japan
- Died: 3 October 2017 (aged 97); Hiroshima, Japan
- Occupation: Peace activist
- Years active: 1955–2017
- Known for: Work commemorating the victims of the atomic bombing of Hiroshima

Toshiko Saiki (née Mosoji, Japanese: 佐伯 敏子, romanized: Saeki Toshiko; 24 December 1919 – 3 October 2017) was a Japanese anti-nuclear activist. A survivor of the atomic bombing of Hiroshima, she was known as the "guardian of the Atomic Bomb Memorial Tower" (原爆供養塔の守り人, Genbakukuyōtō no mamoribito) and the "Great Mother of Hiroshima" (ヒロシマの大母さん, Hiroshima no dai kāsan) due to the years she spent voluntarily cleaning the Atomic Bomb Memorial Tower at the Hiroshima Peace Memorial Park, which housed the unclaimed remains of atomic bomb victims. In addition, Saiki provided testimonies as a hibakusha to contribute to the anti-nuclear movement, as well as the peace movement.

== Early life and marriage ==
Saiki was born on 24 December 1919 in Midorii, a village in what is now the Asaminami-ku ward of Hiroshima. She was the sixth child born to Japanese paper makers, with two older brothers and three older sisters. In 1927, Saiki's younger sister was born.

In 1939, Saiki married and moved to Hakushima Kyukencho in Hiroshima; she had her first son in 1941. Following the outbreak of the Pacific War in 1943, her husband was deployed to China. Shortly afterwards, Saiki left her son to be cared for by her sister-in-law in Otsuka, a village on the outskirts of Hiroshima, while she moved in with her mother in Hirose Motomachi.

== Atomic bombing of Hiroshima ==
On 6 August 1945, Saiki was visiting her son at her sister-in-law's home when an atomic bomb was dropped on the city. Her sister-in-law's home was located 10 kilometres from where the bomb detonated, and so was not damaged by the bombing, though the homes of both her mother, as well as their family home, were closer to the epicentre. Saiki searched for her family members; two of her brothers and one of her sisters died in front of her, while her mother's head was found the following month. In total, Saiki lost 13 relatives in the first 70 days following the bombing, including her husband's parents, her oldest brother's wife, a niece and a nephew, two uncles, an aunt, and a cousin. Saiki subsequently worked supporting survivors of the bombings, though found it difficult to find assistance from local residents, including members of her own family, due to fears that radiation sickness could be contagious; others stated that the deaths of the injured would reduce the number of people needing food, which had become scarce following the bombing.

Following the end of World War II in 1945, Saiki continued to in Hiroshima with her husband, who returned from China; they had a second son in 1947. Saiki was exposed to residual radiation due to the time she spent in Hiroshima in the immediate aftermath of the bombing; she suffered from temporary ill health, including all of her teeth falling out, requiring dentures, and leukopenia, following which her weight dropped to 28 kilograms. At that time, there was no medical assistance provided for hibakusha, and Saiki could not afford medical care. In 1953, following the birth of her third son, Saiki was found to have cancer in several of her organs, and required surgery to remove her ovaries and stomach.

== Activism ==
=== Atomic Bomb Memorial Tower ===
In 1955, the Atomic Bomb Memorial Tower was completed at the Hiroshima Peace Memorial Park. It was built to bury the unclaimed bodies of people killed during the atomic bombing. Initially, it did not receive many visitors, and became overgrown with weeds. Saiki began to visit the park daily in order to clean the tower, including sweeping away fallen leaves, weeding, and tending to flowers that had been left at the tower. Saiki was motivated to do so in part due to it being possible that members of her family whose bodies had not been located, including her mother, might be buried there. She also stated that she did so as an act of penance after not helping those who had been injured in the initial aftermath of the bombing due to her focusing on locating her family members. Saiki said that she felt she had a duty as a survivor to "covey the voiceless voices of the victims" who she described as "waiting for their loved ones to come and get them". Due to the frequency in which Saiki was seen cleaning the memorial, many members of the public assumed she was employed by the city as a cleaner.

The journey from Saiki's home to the memorial took around an hour by bus. While cleaning the memorial, Saiki wore mofuku, a traditional black mourning dress. On the sixth day of every month, Saiki invited a monk to perform a memorial service in front of the tower on the monthly anniversaries of the bombing; the previous night, she would light candles beside the tower and hold a tsuya, a Buddhist ceremony held prior to a funeral.

In 1965, a radio broadcast by RCC Broadcasting listed the names of victims of the bombing who were buried at the Atomic Bomb Memorial Tower, which included Saiki's parents-in-law. As a result, she was able to retrieve their bodies and rebury them. After this had happened, Saiki considered giving up her cleaning of the tower, though ultimately continued after her youngest son told her "it would be wrong to quit now that your own family has been found".

==== Identification of bodies ====
In 1970, Saiki was given access to the ossuary, containing the remains of 70,000 people located beneath the memorial and asked if she would clean it in addition to the tower. The ossuary included a notebook containing the names of the identified deceased whose bodies had not been claimed by their families. Saiki began to attempt to make contact with the families of unclaimed victims by identifying details such as surnames and contacting people in phone books with the same name. In the first six months, Saiki was able to get ten bodies claimed by their families; her husband would transport her to the homes of families, while her children picked up household chores in her absence. Further bodies were identified in 1973 when Saiki's work in the ossuary was featured in a local newscast.

As more remains were claimed by their families, criticism of the government of Hiroshima for its "negligence" concerning the management of bodies increased, including newspaper articles stating that Saiki was doing the work that "the city should be doing". Public pressure led to local authorities in Hiroshima in 1975 publishing the list of people whose bodies were interred at the memorial, and posting them out to cities, towns and villages in Hiroshima Prefecture. Of the 2500 identified remains in the ossuary, 1000 were claimed in 1975 alone. Saiki stopped her identifying work when the city took over, but continued her daily cleaning of the memorial tower.

=== Public testimonies ===
In 1967, after public signs at the memorial were removed identifying it as containing human remains, Saiki, concerned that the nuclear bombing of Hiroshima would be forgotten, began writing her experiences into notebooks, which she posted out to over 40 schools in the city. While the initial response to Saiki's writing was muted, it later came to the attention of the Atomic Bomb Literature Reading Group (原爆文献を読む会, Genbaku bunken o yomu kai), which in 1972 published her notes in the form of a magazine entitled Watching the Deaths of Thirteen People (十三人の死をみつめて, Jū san-ri no shi o mitsumete). The magazine was popular, which drew greater public attention to Saiki; some schools incorporated her writings into their curriculum. The Atomic Bomb Literature Reading Group's subsequent presence in Tokyo led to her becoming more known outside of Hiroshima, with some Tokyo schools starting school trips to visit Hiroshima.

The increase of visits to the Atomic Bomb Memorial Tower led to Saiki taking on a greater role as a storyteller in addition to her cleaning of the memorial; she spoke about her experiences during the bombing and the war, and stressed the importance of peace. Saiki said one of her motivations was to prevent young people "mistakenly thinking that war was something cool". Saiki began to make talks away from the school, including at schools, where she wore mofuku and described herself as "in mourning 365 days a year", in addition to calling Hiroshima a "city of the dead".

While her public profile as a hibakusha grew, Saiki did not join any survivor groups or political movements; she publicly stated the Japanese government had never apologised for the deaths of her family members during the war, and added that she wanted to think for herself and not as part of a group. As a result, some members of the anti-nuclear movement and survivor groups described her as "unfriendly".

=== Other memorials ===
In 1977, Saiki participated in a project in which roof tiles damaged in the bombing where collected from the Motoyasu River. In 1981, Saiki collected buttons from the Motoyasu River from the school uniforms of students who had jumped into the river after being burned in the bombing, building a memorial shrine at the river.

== Later life and death ==
In 1988, Saiki's husband died. During the 1990s, her health deteriorated, and she was frequently hospitalised. Stating publicly "I want to do as much as I can for as long as I can", Saiki increased the number of public testimonies she gave, sometimes speaking up to seven times a day, despite the urges of her friends to not overexert herself; she reportedly said "if I reduce the number of testimonies I give, does that guarantee I will live longer?".

In 1998, Saiki experienced a stroke which prevented her from going out and also impacted her speaking; she was unable to continue her daily visits to the Atomic Bomb Memorial Tower and giving talks. She did continue to provide testimonies to people who visited her at her home, where she was recuperating.

By 2016, Saiki was unable to walk and had lost sight in both of her eyes, and was living in a nursing home in Higashi-ku. She continued to be visited, including by outlets such as NHK, and she stated in one of her last interviews "humans are making things that kill humans. I want this kind of foolishness to end with just us. If you want to know about Hiroshima, please visit the memorial tower. Come and listen to the words of the dead. That is my wish".

In late 2017, Saiki was hospitalised after experiencing a decline in her health. On 3 October, she died of heart failure at the age of 97.

== Recognition ==
In 1984, Saiki had featured in the anti-nuclear documentary film A Testimony for Survival: From Hiroshima Today (生きるための証言 - いま、ヒロシマから, Ikiru tame no shōgen - ima, Hiroshimakara), in which she recounted her experiences during the bombing. The following year, she featured in a segment of NHK General TV's Ohayo Journal entitled "Do You Know About War? A Message to Children" (戦争を知っていますか? 子どもたちへのメッセージ, Sensō o shitte imasu ka? Kodomo-tachi e no messēji). Saiki's testimony was featured again in the 1997 documentary Let's Meet Again (またあいましょう, Mata aimashou), which was aired by the Asahi Broadcasting Corporation.

The illustrator Shigeo Nishimura was inspired by a meeting with Saiki to write the picture book The Hiroshima Atomic Bomb in Pictures (絵で読む広島の原爆, E de yomu Hiroshima no genbaku), which was published in 1995 with writing by Masamoto Nasu, who had also met Saiki. The work was featured in a 2008 exhibition of original art inspired by the bombings at the Hiroshima Peace Memorial Museum.

In 1994, students at Kochi Municipal Fourth Elementary School put on a performance based on Saiki's life, entitled There's No Age Limit in Hiroshima (ヒロシマに歳はないんよ, Hiroshima ni toshi wa nai n yo). Between 1996 and 1998, schools in Osaka, moved by Saiki's testimony, raised 320, 000 JPY, which was used for memorial services for victims of the bombing, as well as for peace work.

In 2000, after ill-health prevented Saiki from speaking publicly, Ikuo Teranishi, a former civil servant, began performing There's No Age Limit in Hiroshima. By 2018, Den no Kai, a group comprising Teranishi and three others, regularly performed the piece. They also perform another piece about Saiki's life, entitled Great Mother of Hiroshima, performed since 2001, including annual performances outside the Atomic Bomb Memorial Tower on the anniversary of the bombing of Hiroshima.

In 2005, Saiki received the Hiroshima Citizens' Award, in recognition of her 40 years of volunteer work cleaning the Atomic Bomb Memorial Tower, as well as her 20 years of public testimonies about her experiences as a survivor of the bombing.

In 2015, Keiko Horikawa published The Atomic Bomb Memorial Tower: 70 Years of Forgotten Remains (原爆供養塔 忘れられた遺骨の70年, Genbakukuyōtō wasure rareta ikotsu no 70-nen), chronicling both the life of Saiki as well as the Atomic Bomb Memorial Tower. It won the Grand Prize in the Grassroots Democracy category at the 15th Ishibashi Tanzan Memorial Journalism Awards from Waseda University, as well as Best Book at the 2016 Soichi Oya Nonfiction Awards. It was also given a Special Prize by the Japan National Press Club.

In August 2022, the Hiroshima Fieldwork Executive Committee, a citizens group, published a compilation of Saiki's work, entitled Continuing to Protect the Atomic Bomb Surviving Relics: The Testimony of Toshiko Saiki (原爆納骨安置所を守り続けて 佐伯敏子さんの証言, Genbaku nōkotsu anchi-sho o mamori tsudzukete Saiki Toshiko-san no shōgen).
