= Hubert Schiffer =

Survivor of atomic bombing of Hiroshima

Father Hubert Schiffer
- Schiffer (left) with Enola Gay co-pilot and aircraft commander Robert A. Lewis in 1951
- Born: Hubert Friedrich Heinrich Schiffer; July 15, 1915; Gütersloh, Province of Westphalia, Prussia, German Empire
- Died: March 27, 1982 (aged 66); Frankfurt, West Germany
- Occupation: Jesuit
- Known for: Surviving the bombing of Hiroshima

Father Hubert Friedrich Heinrich Schiffer, S.J. (July 15, 1915 – March 27, 1982) (Note: Schiffer's lifespan is given as 1915–1982 in the Archive of the Central European Province of the Jesuits (Archiv der Zentraleuropäischen Provinz der Jesuiten). Newspaper writers reporting on Schiffer in 1950, when he was speaking in the United States, mentioned his year of birth as 1915 and his age as 35. A 1982 newspaper article stated that Schiffer was 57 when he died, which suggests a circa 1925 birth year, but this lacks corroboration and is inconsistent with other sourcing that states Schiffer became a Jesuit in 1934.) was a German Jesuit who survived the atomic bomb "Little Boy" dropped on Hiroshima.

== Life ==
=== Early life ===
Hubert Friedrich Heinrich Schiffer was born in Gütersloh, Westphalia, on 15 July 1915. He was the son of Fritz Schiffer, an accountant, and his wife Anna (née Gertzen).

Schiffer was educated at the Prinz-Georg Gymnasium, Gymnasium der Weißen Väter, and the Hohenzollern-Gymnasium in Düsseldorf.

=== Becoming a Jesuit ===
In 1934, Schiffer entered the Jesuit order in 's-Heerenberg in the Netherlands, where the German Jesuits had settled after their expulsion was caused by the Kulturkampf of Bismarck and the Jesuit Law.

In 1935, Schiffer was sent to Japan, where he studied Japanese and philosophy in Tokyo. He studied for the priesthood at St. Miki College before being ordained in 1943 by Bishop Johannes Ross of the Hiroshima diocese. Schiffer learned to speak both Japanese and English while in Tokyo.

Schiffer acted as an interpreter for the Chinese bishop Tschao and for the French missionaries there. After this, he studied theology in Shanghai before returning to Japan.

Schiffer was an assistant in a parish church in July of 1945 at Hiroshima.

== Hiroshima bombing ==
Schiffer was one of several Jesuit priests who were at their mission compound, less than 1 mile (1.6 km) from ground zero when the explosion occurred.

Jesuits and their location

Many retellings of the event state there were eight Jesuit priests (or missionaries), who were eight blocks from ground zero. John Hersey, in his contemporary 1946 account Hiroshima, lists four Jesuit priests (Father Superior LaSalle [sic], Father Wilhelm Kleinsorge, Father Cieslik, and Father Schiffer) and places them 1,400 yards (1,300 m) "from the center." Schiffer himself states there were four Jesuit priests — "Father Hugo Lassalle, Superior of the whole Jesuit Mission in Japan, and Fathers Kleinsorge, Cieslik, and Schiffer" — and describes his own location as "within the most deadly one-mile radius." Schiffer also notes the name of their church — "the Jesuit Church of Our Lady's Assumption."

Explosion

According to the 1946 account of Jesuit priest Father John Siemes, who had been on the outskirts of the city:

They were in their rooms at the Parish House—it was a quarter after eight, exactly the time when we had heard the explosion in Nagatsuke—when came the intense light and immediately thereafter the sound of breaking windows, walls and furniture. They were showered with glass splinters and fragments of wreckage. Father Schiffer was buried beneath a portion of a wall and suffered a severe head injury. The Father Superior received most of the splinters in his back and lower extremity from which he bled copiously. Everything was thrown about in the rooms themselves, but the wooden framework of the house remained intact.

Schiffer's own account describes the explosion:

Suddenly, a terrific explosion filled the air with one bursting thunderstroke. An invisible force lifted me from the chair, hurled me through the air, shook me, battered me, whirled me 'round and 'round like a leaf in a gust of autumn wind.

Survivors

All four Jesuit priests survived the explosion. Quoted in 1950, Schiffer said, "Of 14 clergy and laymen we lost only one, a Japanese." The Jesuits were in a building stronger than most surrounding buildings, as noted by Hersey and Siemes, respectively:

[Father Kleinsorge saw] that all the buildings round about had fallen down except the Jesuits’ mission house, which had long before been braced and double-braced by a priest named Gropper, who was terrified of earthquakes

The solidity of the structure which was the work of Brother Gropper again shone forth.

They were not the only survivors close to ground zero; an estimated 14% of people within 1 kilometre (0.62 mi) of ground zero survived the explosion. Other survivors included ten people in a streetcar 750 metres (820 yd) from ground zero, and a woman in a bank 260 metres (280 yd) away from the blast. One person survived at a distance of just 170 metres (190 yd), protected in the basement of a building while looking for documents.

Religious aspects

The survival of the priests has sometimes been referred to as a miracle. In 1951, Schiffer said:

I won't call it a miracle exactly, but I think we were under the special protection of God.

Similarities with Nagasaki are sometimes highlighted, where a Franciscan friary established by St. Maximilian Kolbe was "unaffected by the bomb which fell there", as "the friary was protected from the force of the bomb by an intervening mountain".

== Later life ==
Schiffer met both the pilot and co-pilot of the B-29 that bombed Hiroshima, the Enola Gay.

Schiffer met co-pilot Robert A. Lewis in New York City in 1951. Schiffer invited Lewis to visit Hiroshima in August 1952 for the dedication of a "palace of prayer", which Lewis accepted; however, there is no record of Lewis actually making such a visit. The two also appeared together at Fordham University in 1957, on the twelfth anniversary of the bombing, with Schiffer noting that they had become "very fast friends."

Schiffer later met pilot Paul Tibbets in Dallas in 1975.

Schiffer, who had received a bachelor's degree in Japan, received a master's degree from Fordham University in 1952, and a doctorate there in 1958. In the 1960s, Schiffer worked as an associate professor of economics at St. Joseph's College in Philadelphia, and wrote a book on the Japanese banking system.

Schiffer died in the city of Frankfurt, then part of West Germany, on March 27, 1982.

== Works ==
- Schiffer, Hubert F. (1953). "The Rosary Of Hiroshima". Sacred Heart University.
- Schiffer, Hubert F. (1962). The Modern Japanese Banking System. New York: University Publishers. LCCN 61-14337. OCLC 3099323 – via HathiTrust.

== See also ==
- Julia Canny, another survivor of the bombing of Hiroshima
- Hibakusha, a Japanese term for people affected by the atomic bombings
