= Robert A. Lewis =

US Air Force officer

- Capt. Lewis, c. 1945
- Born: October 18, 1917; Brooklyn, New York, U.S.
- Died: June 18, 1983 (aged 65); Newport News, Virginia, U.S.
- Spouse: Mary Eileen Kelly
- Military career
- Allegiance: United States of America
- Branch: United States Army Air Forces
- Rank: Major
- Unit: 509th Composite Group
- Conflicts: World War II
- Awards: Silver Star
- Other work: Chemist, Manager, Pilot

Robert Alvin Lewis (October 18, 1917 – June 18, 1983) was a United States Army Air Forces officer serving in the Pacific Theatre during World War II. He was the co-pilot and aircraft commander of the Enola Gay, the B-29 Superfortress bomber which dropped the atomic bomb Little Boy on the Japanese city of Hiroshima on August 6, 1945.

== Military career ==
Robert Alvin Lewis was born on October 18, 1917, in Brooklyn, New York. He grew up in Ridgefield Park, New Jersey, where he attended Ridgefield Park High School, graduating in 1937. During World War II, he had to wait after enlisting to be processed into the USAAF Officer Candidate School (OCS). Lewis went on to be a multi-engine test pilot in B-24, B-26, B-17 and B-29 bombers, which later led to him as co-pilot and his crew being selected for the Hiroshima bombing mission.

Lewis was field promoted to captain by General Curtis LeMay after demonstrating the B-29 and training the general on how to fly it. LeMay addressed Lieutenant Lewis as "Captain Lewis" on the field at the conclusion of several days of training and testing. Lewis tried to correct the general as to his rank, but LeMay insisted on captain, with the field commission arriving several weeks later by USAAF mail to him based in the midwestern US at the time.

Lewis was always a "crew-first" pilot who survived two crashes due to electrical failure and engine failure. Articles from New York City area newspapers attested to his "cool head under stressful conditions", ultimately leading to his selection as captain of a B-29 crew. Lewis led hundreds of bombing runs from Utah to Salton Sea in California leading up to his selection with his crew by Colonel Paul Tibbets. In early June, Lewis and his co-pilot Dick McNamara flew the entire crew and support crew from Utah to Tinian, in the B-29 specially modified to carry Little Boy to Japan from the huge Tinian base that General LeMay controlled from Guam.

On August 6, 1945 – August 5 in the United States, due to the time difference – Lewis was the co-pilot of the Enola Gay when it dropped Little Boy on Hiroshima. Normally the aircraft commander assigned to the Enola Gay, for this important mission he acted as co-pilot and co-commander, assisting Enola Gay's new aircraft commander, Colonel Tibbets. Lewis and his crew, minus their original co-pilot Dick McNamara, were Tibbets' crew for the mission, and it included two specialists for the arming of Little Boy, the uranium-235 fission bomb.

The entire story was written by Lewis just before his death in 1983. His log, the only minute-by-minute recording on paper by any crew member that day, is part of his copyrighted historical manuscript owned by the Lewis children.

== Post-war ==
After the war, Lewis became a pilot for American Overseas Airlines, specializing in the New York to London routes. He left in 1947 to rejoin his prewar employer, the Henry Heide Candy Company, where he became plant manager and personnel director of their factory in New Brunswick, New Jersey. He was granted at least three patents during his time at Heide. In the 1950s, Lewis lived with his family in Ridgefield Park, Maywood and Lake Mohawk. He and his wife had a daughter and four sons.

=== Survivor meetings ===
In New York City in 1951, Lewis met Hiroshima survivor Father Hubert Schiffer, who was eight blocks from ground zero when the explosion occurred and was seriously injured. Schiffer invited Lewis to visit Hiroshima in August 1952 for the dedication of a "palace of prayer", which Lewis accepted; however, there is no record of Lewis actually making such a visit. The two also appeared together at Fordham University in 1957, on the twelfth anniversary of the bombing, with Schiffer noting that they had become "very fast friends."

In 1955, Lewis appeared on the television show This Is Your Life, in an episode not without controversy. The show had as its guest Reverend Kiyoshi Tanimoto, who had been living in Hiroshima at the time of the bombing and survived the explosion, as recounted in John Hersey's 1946 book Hiroshima. Tanimoto had traveled to the United States with the Hiroshima Maidens to get reconstructive surgery for them, and while there was the subject of the May 11 episode of This Is Your Life. After some acquaintances were introduced and interviewed, a surprise for Tanimoto was meeting Lewis – on live television broadcast to a nationwide audience – representing the crew of the aircraft that had so dramatically changed his life. Contemporary reaction to the episode was mixed, ranging from "one of [the] best" to a "new low in poor taste." Lewis described the Enola Gay's flight and the dropping of the bomb on Hiroshima. When asked by host Ralph Edwards if he remembered his reaction on that fateful day, he remarked, "I wrote down later, 'My God, what have we done?' "

=== Later life ===
Lewis became a self-taught stone sculptor, working in marble and alabaster, following a business trip to Florence where he saw some apprentices at work. One of his sculptures, titled ‘God’s Wind’ at Hiroshima?, depicted a mushroom cloud. In the 1970s, Lewis lived in a small cottage on West Shore Trail in the quiet Lake Mohawk community of Sparta, New Jersey.

In 1971, Lewis sold his manuscript log from the Hiroshima mission, which he had written during the flight at the request of journalist William L. Laurence; it was auctioned by Christie's and sold for $37,000. The manuscript was later resold to Malcolm Forbes, and after Forbes' death was purchased by an anonymous buyer. Prior to the 1971 sale, Lewis made six hand-written copies of the log, one each for his wife and five children; one copy was sold in 2015 for $50,000.

In 1975, Lewis took a position with the Estee Candy Corporation, until his retirement in 1981. He was portrayed by Gregory Harrison in the 1980 television film Enola Gay: The Men, the Mission, the Atomic Bomb. Lewis lived in Smithfield, Virginia, for two years before his death in 1983 of a heart attack at home; he was declared dead at Riverside Hospital in Newport News, Virginia.
