= Hiroshima: BBC History of World War II =

2005 British television documentary

- DVD cover art
- Genre: Documentary; History; Military
- Written by: Paul Wilmshurst
- Directed by: Paul Wilmshurst
- Narrated by: John Hurt
- Theme music composer: Daniel Pemberton
- Country of origin: United Kingdom
- Original language: English

Production
- Producer: Paul Wilmshurst
- Editors: Luke Dunkley; Horacio Queiro
- Running time: 89 minutes

Original release
- Network: BBC One; BBC America; Discovery Channel
- Release: 5 August 2005

Hiroshima is a BBC docudrama that premiered as a television special on 5 August 2005, marking the eve of the 60th anniversary of the atomic bombing of Hiroshima. The programme was aired on the Discovery Channel and BBC America in the United States. The documentary features historical reenactments using firsthand eyewitness accounts and computer-generated imagery of the explosion. The film won an Emmy and three BAFTA awards in 2006.

== Summary ==
The documentary recounts the world's first nuclear attack and examines the repercussions. Covering a three-week period from the Trinity test to the atomic bombing of Hiroshima, the program chronicles America's political gamble and the planning for the momentous event. Archival film, dramatizations, and special effects depict what occurred aboard the Enola Gay and inside the nuclear blast.

== Eyewitness interviews ==
Six Japanese survivors are interviewed: Kinuko Laskey (a nurse in a communications hospital), Morio Ozaki (an army cadet), Teruko Fujii (16-year-old tram driver), Thomas Takashi Tanemori (an eight-year-old schoolboy), Dr. Shuntaro Hida (a doctor at a military hospital), and Akiko Takakura (a 17-year-old city bank clerk).

From the United States the interviewees are Paul Tibbets (the commanding officer and pilot of the Enola Gay), Theodore Van Kirk (the navigator of the aircraft), Morris R. Jeppson (the weapon test officer), and Russell Gackenbach (the navigator of the accompanying photographic aircraft Necessary Evil). White House Map Room Duty Officer George Elsey is interviewed as an eyewitness to the Potsdam Conference.

== Alternate titles ==
- Hiroshima
- Hiroshima: BBC History of World War II
- Hiroshima: The First Weapon of Mass Destruction

== See also ==
- Atomic bombings of Hiroshima and Nagasaki
- Hibakusha
- Paul Tibbets
- White Light/Black Rain: The Destruction of Hiroshima and Nagasaki
