= Joe Kieyoomia =

United States Army soldier

- Born: Joe Lee Kieyoomia; November 21, 1919
- Died: February 17, 1997 (aged 77)
- Burial place: San Juan County, New Mexico
- Military career
- Allegiance: United States of America
- Branch: United States Army
- Rank: Sergeant
- Units: 200th Coast Artillery
- Conflicts: World War II: Philippines campaign (1941–1942) (POW); Bombing of Nagasaki
- Awards: Purple Heart; Prisoner of War Medal

Joe Lee Kieyoomia (November 21, 1919 – February 17, 1997) was a Navajo soldier in New Mexico's 200th Coast Artillery unit who was captured by the Imperial Japanese Army after the fall of the Philippines in 1942 during World War II. Kieyoomia was a POW in Nagasaki at the time of the atomic bombing but survived, reportedly having been shielded from the effects of the bomb by the concrete walls of his cell.

The Japanese tried unsuccessfully to have him decode messages in the Navajo Code used by the United States Marine Corps, but although Kieyoomia understood Navajo, the messages sounded like nonsense to him. Although the code is based on the Navajo language, it is decipherable only by individuals specifically trained in its usage.

Kieyoomia is notable for having not only survived the Bataan Death March and related internment and torture in a concentration camp, but also for being a hibakusha (atomic bomb survivor).

== Capture of the Philippine Islands ==
The surrender of Bataan hastened the fall of Corregidor, a month later. Without this final stand however, the Japanese might have quickly overrun all of the U.S. bases in the Pacific. Conflict in Bataan forced them to slow down, giving the allies valuable time to prepare for conflicts such as the Battle of the Coral Sea and the Battle of Midway which followed closely thereafter. Ultimately, Kieyoomia, along with more than 60,000 Filipino and 15,000 U.S. prisoners of war were forced into the infamous Bataan Death March.

== Prisoner of war ==
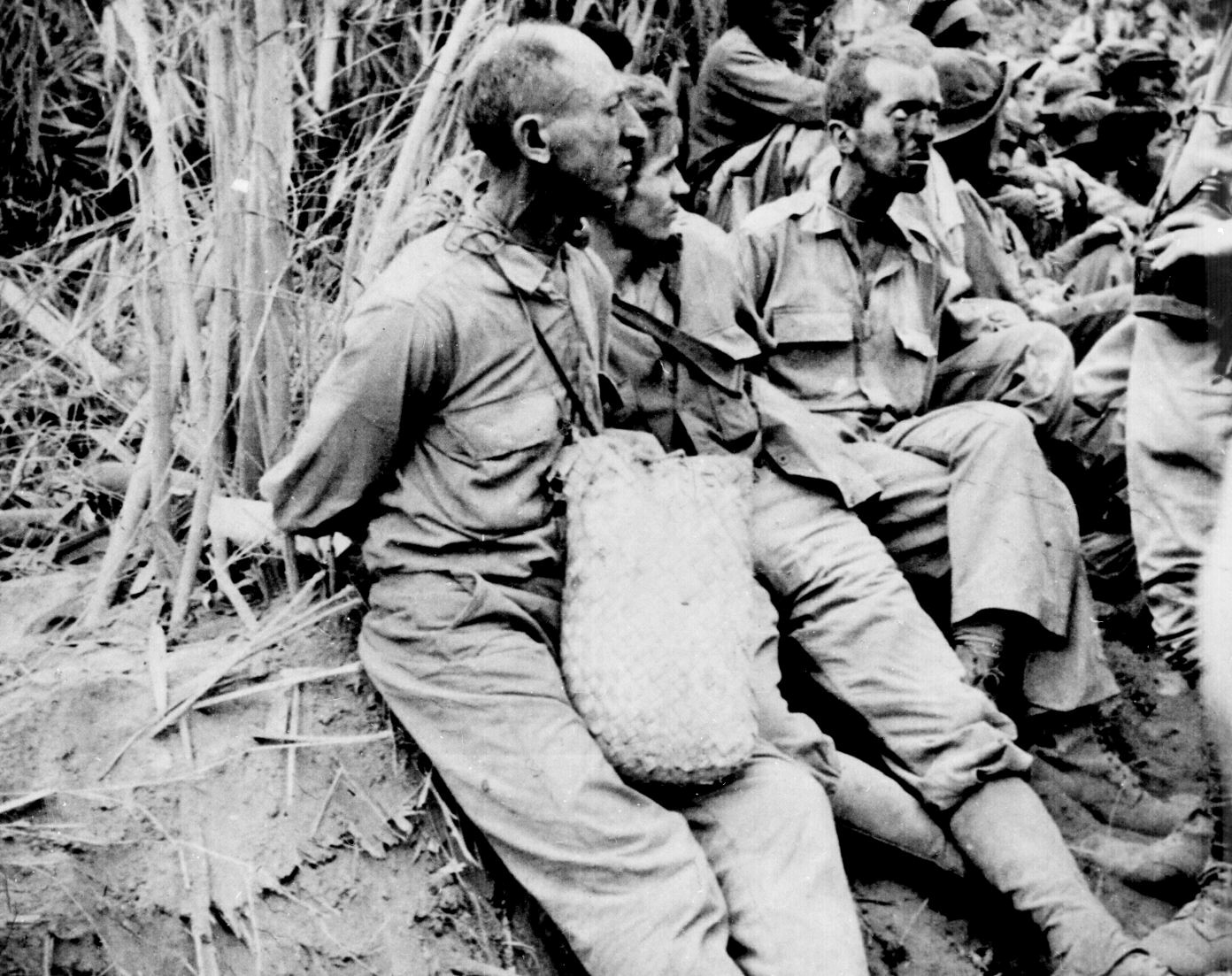
Prisoners on the march from Bataan to the prison camp, May 1942. (National Archives)

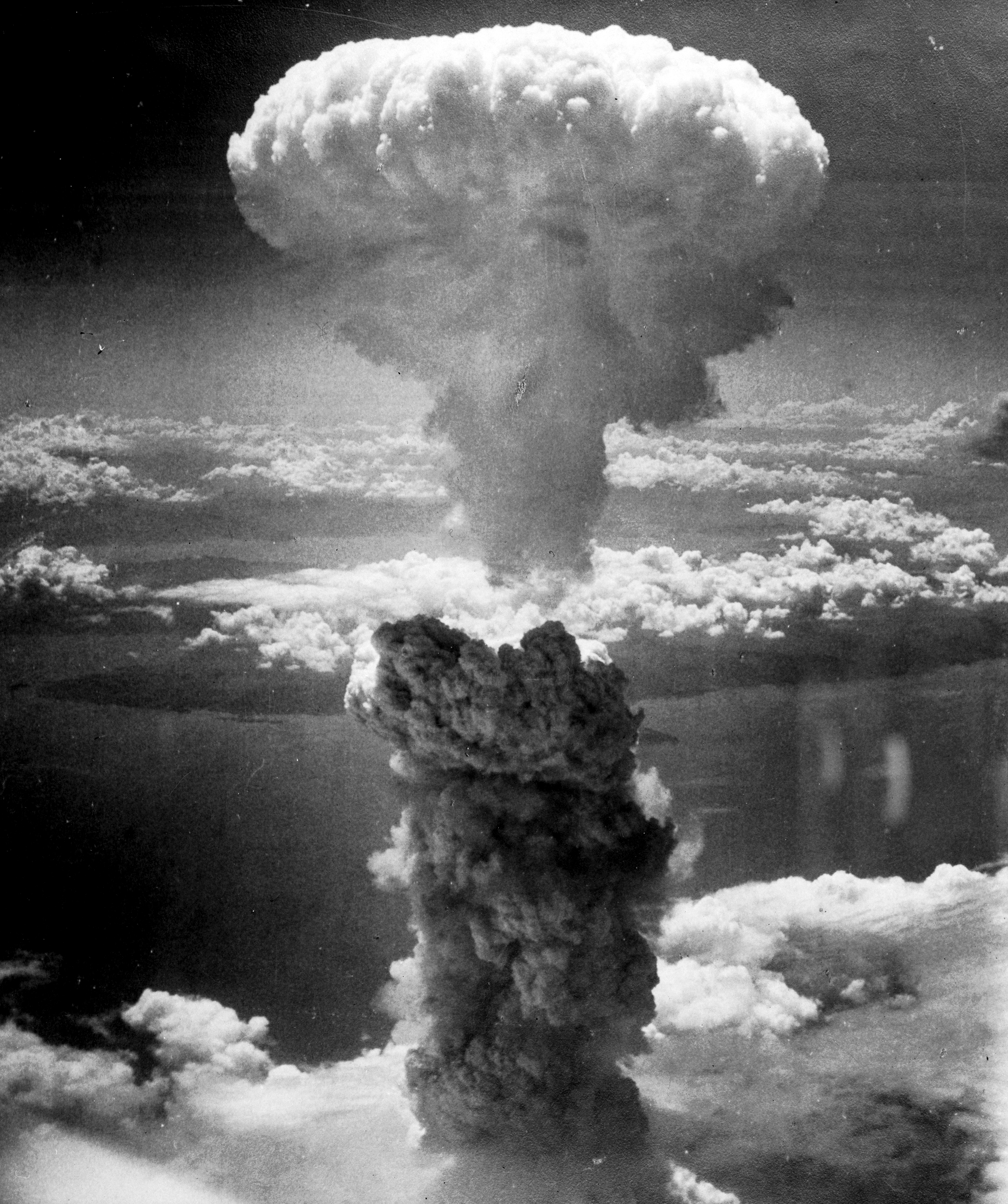
The atomic bomb's mushroom cloud after detonating over Nagasaki

Initially tortured because his captors thought he was Japanese-American (and therefore a traitor), Kieyoomia suffered months of harsher punishment and beatings before the Japanese accepted his claim to Navajo ancestry.

He survived the death march that killed thousands of starved U.S. and Philippine soldiers. When the Navajo Code had the Japanese baffled, Kieyoomia was questioned and tortured although, as he was deployed to the Philippines with New Mexico's 200th Coast Artillery, he did not even know of the code's existence, and could only understand bits and pieces of what the code talkers were saying. Eventually, this led him to tell the Japanese that it sounded like nonsense to him.

As punishment for his inability to crack the code and possibly because the Japanese viewed him as unwilling to crack it, he was stripped naked and forced to stand for hours in deep snow until he talked. When he was finally allowed to return to his cell, a guard shoved him, causing the soles of his feet to tear as they were frozen to the ground. He continued to be beaten, to the point that he could no longer use his right leg.

After surviving the prison camps, hell ships and torture, Kieyoomia was a prisoner in Nagasaki when it was the target of the second atomic bomb dropped by the U.S. Army Air Forces (USAAF). He survived the attack, saying he was protected by the concrete walls of his cell. After 3 1/2 years as a prisoner of war, he was abandoned in the city for three days after the bombing, but said a Japanese officer finally freed him.

== Later life and death ==
After the war, Kieyoomia returned to the U.S. and regained the use of his wounded leg, and his feet healed. He lived to age 77, dying in 1997.

== See also ==
- United States Army
- Native Americans and World War II
- Southern Athabaskan languages
