= Sumiteru Taniguchi =

Japanese atomic bombing survivor

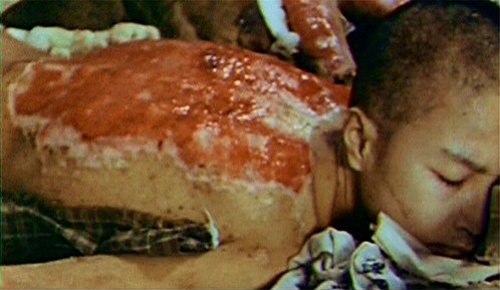
- Photograph of Taniguchi taken by USMC photographer Joe O'Donnell in January 1946, it has been featured in multiple exhibitions and is currently held by the Nagasaki Atomic Bomb Museum.
- Born: 26 January 1929; Fukuoka, Empire of Japan
- Died: 30 August 2017 (aged 88); Nagasaki, Japan
- Other name: 谷口 稜曄
- Known for: atomic bombing survivor; anti-nuclear weapons activist

Sumiteru Taniguchi (谷口 稜曄, Taniguchi Sumiteru; 26 January 1929 – 30 August 2017) was a Japanese anti-nuclear activist and survivor of the 1945 atomic bombing of Nagasaki, who was chairman of the Nagasaki Council of A-Bomb Sufferers.

== Early life ==
Taniguchi Sumiteru was born in Fukuoka, Japan in 1929. His mother died when he was a year and a half old. After this, his father decided to relocate elsewhere for work and ended up being a locomotive operator in Manchuria. Taniguchi and his two brothers went to live with his mother's family in Nagasaki where he was raised by his aunt. In early 1943, Taniguchi began working as a carrier for the Nishiura-Kami post office in Nagasaki. He continued this into 1945 when the nuclear explosion took place.

== Atomic bombing of Nagasaki ==
On the morning of 9 August 1945, the 16-year-old Taniguchi was approximately 1,800 metres (5,900 ft) north from the hypocenter, delivering mail on his bicycle without a shirt on due to the warm summer weather, when "Fat Man" exploded in the sky over Urakami. The bomb's heat flash heavily injured Taniguchi with near instant burns resulting, but the blast that arrived afterward did not cause any severe injuries to him, as he clung to the ground while buildings were blown down around him. Heavy burns melted skin from his back and left arm, but Taniguchi states that he did not bleed or feel any pain due to the nerve endings being burned away. Tired and disoriented, he walked over to the tunnel of Mitsubishi Sumiyoshi Tunnel Arms Factory located about 200 meters away from where he was at the time of the blast, where a female survivor assisted in cutting off loose portions of skin and rubbed machine oil on his damaged arm.

== Recovery ==
Come nightfall, Taniguchi was carried to a hill to rest, where he was surrounded by confused and thirsty survivors. The next morning everyone but Taniguchi was dead. During the next two days rescue teams passed by without noticing him, as he was too weak to muster a call for help. Taniguchi was finally rescued on 11 August and taken to a country clinic about 29 km (18 miles) away from Nagasaki. By mid-September he was moved to a primary school clinic in Nagasaki to receive the first course of medical treatment from a University Hospital team. The clinic was unsanitary and initial treatments proved inadequate as his wounds became infected and worsened.

In November, Taniguchi was transferred to Omura Navy Hospital, where he spent the next 21 months lying on his stomach due to the severe third degree burns on his back. During this time, Taniguchi developed severe bedsores on his chest. As he recalls, "holes opened between my ribs and the movement of my heart and other organs became visible through the skin." In October 1945, U.S. Marine photographer Joe O'Donnell snapped a picture of Taniguchi's back while recording the aftermath of the bombing in 50 Japanese cities; this photograph is now exhibited in museums as a graphic depiction of the injuries sustained by survivors of the bombings. Taniguchi's business card featured this photograph with the caption, "I want you to understand, if only a little, the horror of nuclear weapons."

The color photograph(s) of Sumiteru Taniguchi's red back are from motion picture film taken by (attributed to) Lieutenant Herbert Sussan. Sergeant Joe O'Donnell took an earlier black and white photograph and this is included in his book, Japan 1945: A U.S. Marine's Photographs from Ground Zero.

By May 1947, Taniguchi could finally sit up, and on 20 March 1949, he was discharged from the Omura hospital. He returned to work back at the post office in Nagasaki shortly upon discharge despite needing to receive medical treatment and doctors advising him that he would not be able to. His wounds were not treated properly until 1960, however, and continued to cause him great physical discomfort until his death. The improper burn healing and to some degree the delayed stochastic effects of radiation exposure during and after the bombings manifested in the growth of numerous burn keloid tumors.

From 2007 until his death, Taniguchi had undergone ten surgeries to remove benign growths. Taniguchi also had multiple skin grafting surgeries on his back and left arm.

== Activism ==
Taniguchi devoted his life to informing people of the consequences of the 1945 atomic bombing and campaigning against nuclear proliferation. He made frequent public appearances to speak to student groups and participate in demonstrations calling for nuclear disarmament. Taniguchi gave numerous interviews recounting his experiences and was featured in Steven Okazaki's 2007 documentary White Light/Black Rain: The Destruction of Hiroshima and Nagasaki.

== Death ==
Taniguchi died of duodenal papilla cancer in Nagasaki on 30 August 2017 at the age of 88.

== See also ==
- Hibakusha
- Treaty on the Prohibition of Nuclear Weapons - Preamble
