= Masaru Kawasaki =

Masaru Kawasaki 川崎 優
- Born: 19 April 1924; Hiroshima
- Died: 29 November 2018 (aged 94) Tokyo
- Genre: Classical
- Occupations: Composer, conductor, teacher, flautist
- Instrument: Flute
- Years active: 1955-2018
- Website: sites.google.com/site/masarukawasaki/

Masaru Kawasaki (川崎 優, Kawasaki Masaru; 19 April 1924 – 29 November 2018) was a Japanese conductor and composer. He was known for writing original compositions specifically for concert band, as did Toshio Akiyama and Ichitaro Tsujii, but has also written many works for the flute.

== Biography ==
Born in Hiroshima, Japan, as the son of an opera singer, he was in his second year at music school when he was drafted into the Second Unit, Hiroshima Transport Corps of the Japanese army, age 19. This took him to Hiroshima, where he worked on sonar due to his good hearing (but poor sight). He was there when the city was obliterated by the atomic bomb in 1945, being only 1.5 km from the epicenter of the blast and suffering horrendous injuries which were still being treated 60 years later. He is thus a Hibakusha.

After the war he studied at Tokyo University of the Arts under Saburō Moroi, graduating in 1949. Later, in 1965-66 he had the opportunity to study further at the Juilliard School of Music, in New York, under Vincent Persichetti and Václav Nelhýbel.

He was professor of composition, music theory and flute at Tokoha Gakuen University, lecturer in flute and woodwind ensemble at Tokyo University of the Arts, and director of 'Tokyo Wind Symphony Orchestra' ja:東京吹奏楽団.

He was active in WASBE, the World Association for Symphonic Bands and Ensembles and the Japanese Bandmasters Association.

He also was musical director from 1979 to 1994 of the "International Youth Musicale" in Shizuoka, Japan, and took part as adjudicator in many international music competitions. He himself won numerous awards, such as the Composition Prize of the Ministry of Education (1956), NHK Presidential Composition Prize (1956; both at the National Arts Festival), and UNESCO fellowship for Creative Artist (1966-1967).

He has written opera, solo and ensemble pieces including many for wind band, and published many works for and about this format.

Despite initially being reluctant to take up the atomic bombing as a theme in his music, he eventually felt he had a "mission as an A-bomb victim" and in 1975 composed the first in a series of "Prayer music", the "Dirge" which was requested by and dedicated to the city of Hiroshima and has since been played every year on 6 August at the Hiroshima Peace Memorial Ceremony. As of 2012 he was still composing pieces in this series, and has said "I have made it a personal commitment to continue creating compositions in tribute to all the victims of the atomic bomb".

He lived in Chigasaki, with his dog. He had two sons from his wife Taeko Koide, and enjoyed gardening. Some of his children and grandchildren have worked or attended university in the U.S.A. and his own works have also been published in America.

== Selected works ==
=== Orchestral works ===
- 1955 Suite for Orchestra
- 1956 Suite Warabe-Uta for choir and orchestra
- 1957 Symphony on the thematic material inspired by Japanese folk songs
- 1997 Prayer music No. 1 "Dirge"
- 2010 Piccolo Concerto

=== Wind Band Works ===
- 1963 March lay of Hope
- 1966 March Forward for Peace
- 1966 Warabe-Uta for Symphonic Band
- 1969 March Expo' 70 (March Progress and Harmony)
- 1969 The Sketch of Pastoral Scenery
- 1970 Harmony with Progress march - reworking of EXPO March
- 1971 Fantasy for Symphonic Band for the 1971 music festival in Uster, Switzerland
- 1973 Scherzando Suite for Symphonic Band for the 1974 Uster music festival
  1. Prologue
  2. Pastorale
  3. Intermezzo
  4. Perpetual mobile
  5. Epilogue
- 1973 Fantasia on folk themes for wind band - to commemorate the 30th anniversary of publisher Ongaku no Tomo
- 1974 Three little Fantasy on the thematic material inspired by Japanese children's song
  1. Rabbit
  2. Evening grow
  3. Wild goose
- 1975 Dirge: Prayer Music for Band No. 1
- 1976 Poem for Symphonic Band
- 1976 Poetic Tune
- 1977 Elegy: Prayer Music for Band No. 2 - first performed in Uster
- 1978 Fireworks Music on Festival - first performed in Geneva
- 1979 Romantic Episode for the 1981 Uster music festival
- 1982 Romance for Trumpet and Symphonic Band
- 1982 Cupid March
- 1983 Jugenparade
- 1986 Jugend Parade march
- 1986 Song of Hiroshima: Prayer music No. 3 for Symphonic Band
- 1989 Der Alte im Märchenland
- Fantasy in Folk Song Style

=== Stage works ===
- 1957 The Fountain of Hawk Opera about a young Noh actor; for soprano, tenor, baritone, choir and piano

=== Vocal/Choral Works ===
- 1956 The Sea for massed choirs
- 1966 Mugon ka (Song Without Words)
- 1968 Tanpopo (Dandelion)
- 1973 Kozue (Treetop)
- 1973 Singing from the Bottom of my Heart for massed choirs
- 1975 Paean of Ocean Exposition
- 1977 Cherry Blossoms of Japan for massed choirs; text by Maria Hodgson
- 2006 Love You Dearly
- 2006 Daddy's Lullaby

=== Chamber Music etc. ===
- 1958 Sonate nr. 1 for Flute and Piano
- 1961 Sonata No. 2 for Flute and Piano
- 1963 Essay on a Day for Flute and Piano
- 1965 String quartet primo
- 1965 String quartet in two movements
  1. Allegro
  2. Adagio ma non troppo
- 1972 Two Movements for flute
- 1973 Two Pieces for Flute
  1. Andantino
  2. Lento
- 1975 Warabe-Uta for Flute and Piano
  1. Lullaby
  2. Zui Zui Zukkorobashi
  3. Sunset
  4. Rabbit
  5. Grip your hand and open your hand
  6. When this day breaks
  7. Pass by
  8. Wild Goose
- 1984 Cantabile for piano
- 1985 Uta-Vocalize Japanesque for Flute and Piano
- 1988 Nine Dodecaphonic Pieces for two flutes - exercises for twelve-tone music playing
- 1990 La Lagrima for Flute and Piano
- 1991 Three Lyric Pieces for Flute and Piano
  1. Lullaby
  2. Aria
  3. serenade
- 1992 In the Depth of Night for Flute and Cello
- 1994 He Kisses the Flute for Flute, Soprano and Piano
- 1995 Fantastic Composition for Flute and Piano
- 1996 Invitation to the Rhythm for Flute, Percussion and Piano
- 1998 Pretty Violinist for Viol and Piano
- 2001 Theme and Variations on 'Nel cor Piu non mi Sento' (flute/piano)
- 2002 A Ballad for Solo Bass Clarinet
- 2003 Omnibus Piece (flute/piano)
- 2004 Flowing Tune "The Reverie" (flute/piano)
- 2004 String Trio "La improvvisazione", first performed in Cremona
- 2005 Longing (Akogare) (flute/piano)
- 2006 La Preghiera (Inori), Prayer Music No. 4 for viola solo
- 2006 Matins (Akatsuki no Inori), Prayer Music No. 5 for flute/piano
- 2006 12 Pieces for piano in the Relaxed Mood (Kutsurogi no Piano)
- 2010 Vespers (Yuube no Inori), Prayer Music No. 6 for flute/piano
- 2012 After the long years (Iku seisou sugiru to mo), Prayer Music No. 7 for flute/piano

=== Works for flute choir or flute orchestra ===
- 1984 Crystal for flute orchestra
- 1986 Romantic Episode for flute orchestra
- 1987 March Cupid for flute orchestra
- 1992 La Storia dei fiori for flute choir (flutes 1/2/3, alto flute, bass flute)
  1. Crocuc
  2. Don't-forget me not
  3. Sweet pea
  4. Sun flower
- 1993 Two Pieces from Greek Myths for flute choir
  1. Seven maidens pursued by Orion
  2. Flowers born from the tears of Aphrodite
- 1994 Yuki-Onna for flute choir
- 1995 Fenice for flute choir
- 1996 Per gli amanti for flute choir
- 1997 Pinocchio for flute choir
- 1998 Composition for Flute Choir No. 1 "Hymn for Celesta"
  1. Prologue
  2. Dialogue
  3. Celestial Serenade
- 2000 Composition for Flute Choir No. 2 "Digital piano"
  1. A piece for Harpsichord in memory of Maestro Joaquin Rodorigo
  2. La Campana e il Canto
- 2003 Romance for flute orchestra

== Bibliography ==
- Wolfgang Suppan, Armin Suppan: Das Neue Lexikon des Blasmusikwesens, 4. Auflage, Freiburg-Tiengen, Blasmusikverlag Schulz GmbH, 1994, ISBN 3-923058-07-1
- Works by Japanese composers 1991-1992, Compiled by the Japan Federation of Composers, Tokyo: Japan Federation of Composers, 118 p.
- Works by Japanese composers 1989-1990, Compiled by the Japan Federation of Composers, Tokyo: Japan Federation of Composers, 112 p.
- Works by Japanese composers 1983-1984, Compiled by the Japan Federation of Composers, Tokyo: Japan Federation of Composers, 111 p.
- Paul E. Bierley, William H. Rehrig: The heritage encyclopedia of band music : composers and their music, Westerville, Ohio: Integrity Press, 1991, ISBN 0-918048-08-7
- David M. Cummings, Dennis K. McIntire: International who's who in music and musician's directory - (in the classical and light classical fields), Twelfth edition 1990/91, Cambridge, England: International Who's Who in Music, 1991. 1096 p., ISBN 0-948875-20-8
- Hitoshi Matsushita: A checklist of published instrumental music by Japanese composers, Tokyo: Academia Music Ltd., 1989. 181 p., ISBN 4-870170-39-6
- Norman E. Smith: March music notes, Lake Charles, La.: Program Note Press, 1986, ISBN 978-0-9617346-1-9
- Norman E. Smith, Albert Stoutamire: Band Music Notes.- Composer Information and Program Notes for over 600 Band Favorites, Revised Edition, Neil A. Kjos Music Company, San Diego, CA, 1977, 1979, 1989. ISBN 0-8497-5401-1
- Japanese composers and their works (since 1868), Tokyo: 1972
