= Michihiko Hachiya =

Japanese diarist

- Born: 蜂谷道彦; 1903; Okayama Prefecture, Japan
- Died: 1980 (aged 76–77); Okayama Prefecture
- Occupation: Physician
- Known for: Author of Hiroshima Diary

Michihiko Hachiya (蜂谷道彦, Hachiya Michihiko; 1903 in Okayama Prefecture - 1980) was a Japanese physician who survived the atomic bombing of Hiroshima in August 1945. He kept a personal diary of his experience in the aftermath of the bombing which was later published as Hiroshima Diary in 1955.

== Biography ==
Hachiya was born in Okayama prefecture in 1903 and studied medicine at Okayama Medical College. In 1942, he began working as the director of the Hiroshima Communications Hospital, a position he held for some time after the Second World War. He later took on a teaching role at Okayama University medical school. He retired to Okayama and died in 1980.

=== Bombing of Hiroshima ===
Hachiya was the director of the Hiroshima Communications Hospital and lived near the hospital, about a mile from the explosion's center. In his diary, which covers the period from 6 August 1945 to 30 September 1945, he describes the effects of the atomic bomb blast from its first flash in the early morning as he rested from his night shift as an air warden at the hospital. The force of the blast stripped all the clothes from his body but he and his wife survived, however they both received serious burns to their bodies and had to go to the hospital where Hachiya worked. He spent the night in the care of the hospital staff who were not seriously injured.

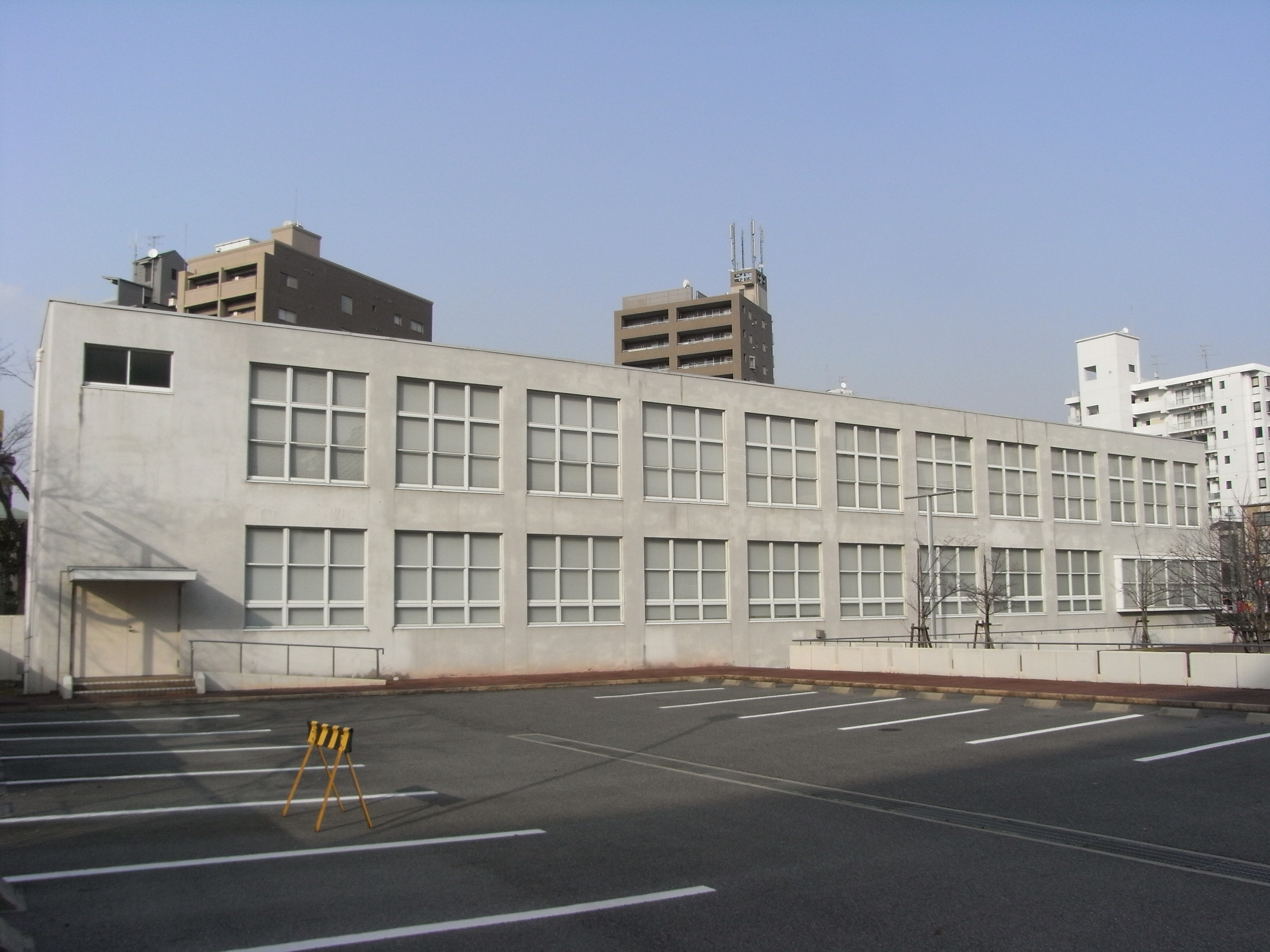
The outpatients building of the Hiroshima postal hospital where Hachiya worked in. It is a museum to the Hiroshima bombing.

After his injuries healed, Hachiya started making his daily rounds as normal. The staff and patients at the hospital called the atomic bomb that hit their city "pikadon" (Pika describes a flash of light and don describes an explosive sound). As time passed, they gathered an understanding of what had happened to their city, and the condition of the hospital drastically improved as more medical supplies were brought into the city, allowing them to better treat patients. The diary goes on to discuss historical events such as the surrender of Japan.

=== Hiroshima Diary ===
After the bombing, Hachiya wrote an account of what happened to him and what he saw. According to a 1984 editorial in the Journal of the American Medical Association, Hachiya first published his diary in a small Japanese-language medical journal (Teishin Igaku) that circulated among medical members of the Japanese communications services. In 1950, it came to the attention of Warner Wells, a physician from the United States who was working in Japan as a surgical consultant to the Atomic Bomb Casualty Commission. After consulting with Hachiya, Wells was able to publish the diary in 1955 under the name of Hiroshima Diary. It was published in 15 languages.

== See also ==
- Hibakusha
