= Hibakusha =

Survivors of atomic bombings in Japan

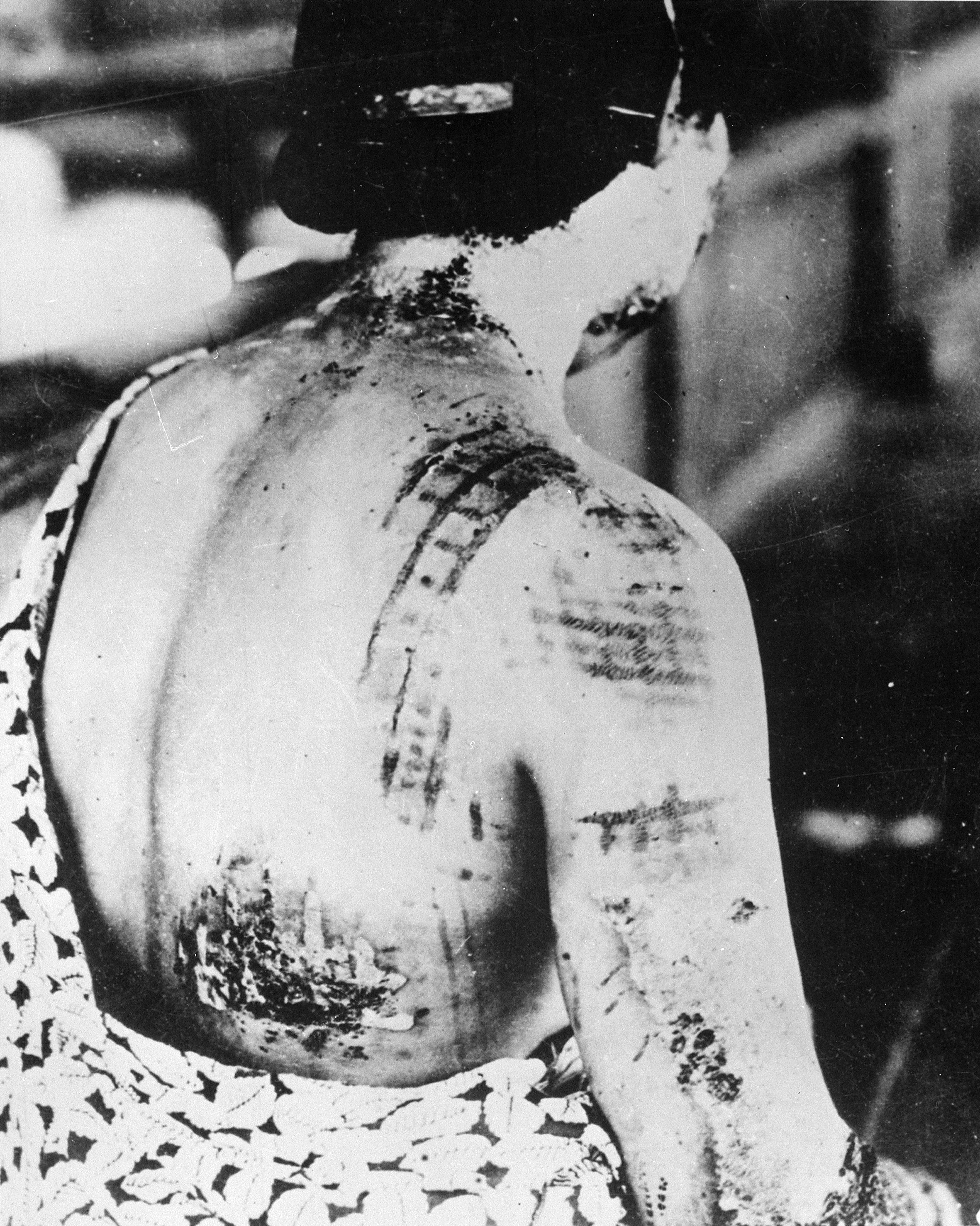
A hibakusha of Hiroshima with symptomatic nuclear burns; the pattern on her skin is from the kimono she was wearing at the moment of the flash.

Hibakusha (pronounced [çibaꜜkɯ̥ɕa] or [çibakɯ̥ꜜɕa]; Japanese: 被爆者 or 被曝者; lit. 'bombing survivor' or 'person affected by exposure [to radioactivity]') is a word of Japanese origin generally designating the people affected by the atomic bombings of Hiroshima and Nagasaki by the United States at the end of World War II.

== Definition ==
The word hibakusha is Japanese, originally written in kanji. While the term hibakusha 被爆者 (hi 被 'particle indicating passive mood of the subsequent verb' + baku 爆 'to bomb' + sha 者 'person') had been previously in Japanese to designate any victim of bombs more generally, it is now primarily used in reference to the survivors of the atomic bombs dropped in Japan by the United States Army Air Forces on 6 and 9 August 1945.

Anti-nuclear movements and associations, among others of hibakusha, spread the term to designate any direct victim of nuclear disaster, including the ones of the nuclear plant in Fukushima. They, therefore, prefer the writing 被曝者 (replacing baku 爆 'to bomb' with the homophonous 曝 ' to expose to s.t.') or 'person exposed to radiation, a person affected by nuclear exposure'. This definition tends to be adopted since 2011.

The legal status of hibakusha is allocated to certain people, mainly by the Japanese government.

== Official recognition ==
The Atomic Bomb Survivors Relief Law defines hibakusha as people who fall into one or more of the following categories: within a few kilometers of the hypocenters of the bombs; within 2 km (1.2 mi) of the hypocenters within two weeks of the bombings; exposed to radiation from fallout; or not yet born but carried by pregnant women in any of the three previously mentioned categories. The Japanese government has recognized about 650,000 people as hibakusha. As of 31 March 2026, 91,105 were still alive, mostly in Japan. The government of Japan recognizes about 1% of these as having illnesses caused by radiation. Hibakusha are entitled to government support. They receive a certain amount of allowance per month, and the ones certified as suffering from bomb-related diseases receive a special medical allowance.

The memorials in Hiroshima and Nagasaki contain lists of the names of the hibakusha who are known to have died since the bombings. Updated annually on the anniversaries of the bombings, as of August 2026, the memorials record the names of more than 550,000 hibakusha; 353,639 in Hiroshima and 204,708 in Nagasaki.

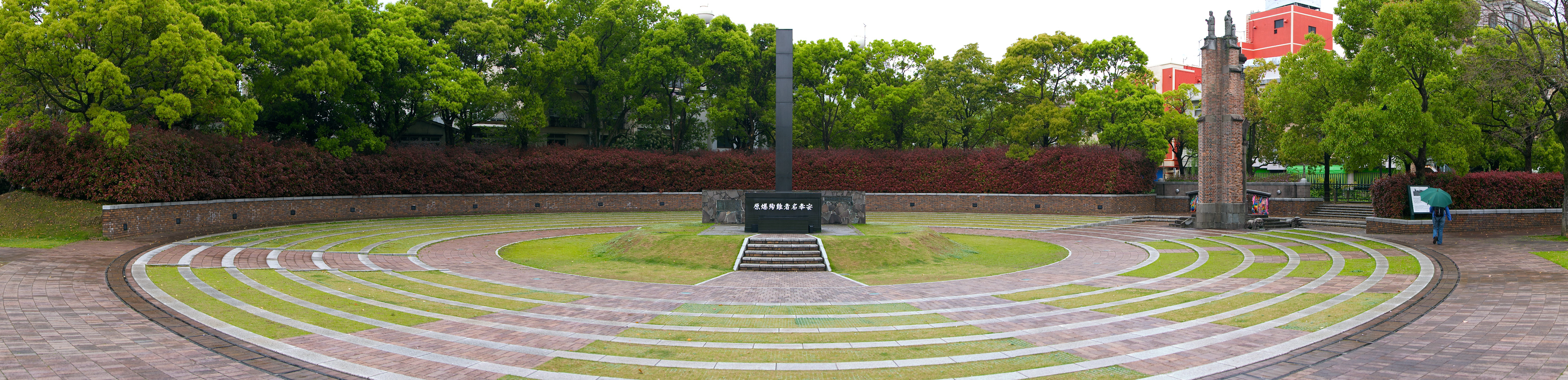
Panoramic view of the monument marking the hypocenter, or ground zero, of the atomic bomb explosion over Nagasaki

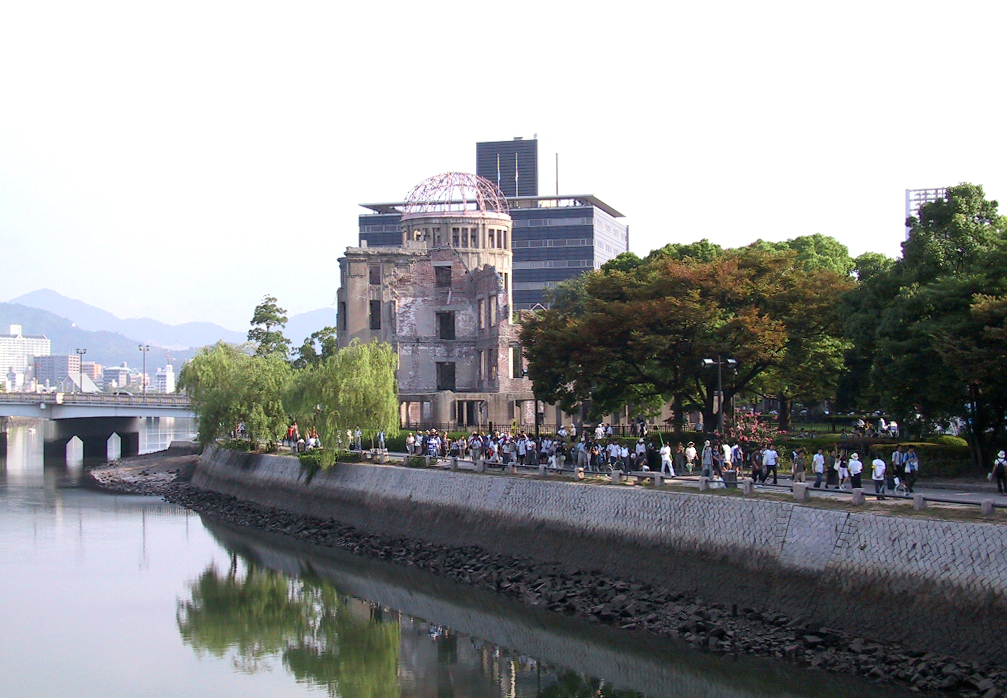
Citizens of Hiroshima walk by the Hiroshima Peace Memorial, the closest building to Ground Zero not to have collapsed from "Little Boy".

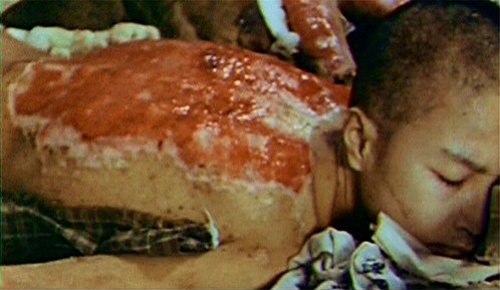
A photograph of Sumiteru Taniguchi's back injuries taken in January 1946 by a U.S. Marine photographer

In 1957, the Japanese Parliament passed a law providing free medical care for hibakusha. During the 1970s, non-Japanese hibakusha who suffered from those atomic attacks began to demand the right to free medical care and the right to stay in Japan for that purpose. In 1978, the Japanese Supreme Court ruled that such persons were entitled to free medical care while staying in Japan.

=== Korean survivors ===
During the war, Korea had been under Japanese imperial rule and many Koreans were living in Hiroshima and Nagasaki at the time of the atomic bombings. More than 2 million Koreans migrated to Japan during the colonial period as a result of financial hardship on the peninsula. Others were either mobilized as laborers or soldiers during World War II. Those who remained in postwar Japan after the atomic bombings were called Zainichi Korean hibakusha. According to recent estimates, about 20,000 Koreans were killed in Hiroshima and about 2,000 died in Nagasaki. It is estimated that one in seven of the Hiroshima victims was of Korean ancestry. The exact number of Korean victims remains unknown; however, the amount of those exposed to radiation increased as laborers were mobilized to provide response and relief to areas that were directly affected.

For many years, Koreans had a difficult time fighting for recognition as atomic bomb victims and were denied health benefits. Some reported discriminatory treatment in applying for allowances and survivor certificates. Others were unable to access information on government relief and healthcare due to literacy barriers. Some of these issues have been addressed in recent years through lawsuits.

Efforts to commemorate Korean victims have been contentious within the context of both North-South Korean divisions, as well as Korean-Japanese relations. The emergence of Cold War geopolitical tensions complicated Zainichi Korean hibakusha efforts to advocate for redress and recognition for Korean victims as the Zainichi community grappled with divisions on their home peninsula.

Several Zainichi Korean hibakusha memorials exist in Japan today, including the Chosen-jin Hibakusha Memorial in Nagasaki Peace Park, as well as the Hiroshima Kankoku-jin Hibakusha Cenotaph. The cenotaph was heavily disputed in terms of its original placement outside of the Peace Memorial Park, as well as its engravings. At the end of the 1990s, joint talks between Hiroshima City mayor Hiraoka Takashi, as well as members of both Mindan and Soren—the two, prominent Zainichi Korean organizations in Japan—helped facilitate the transfer of the cenotaph within the park, which was completed in 1999.

=== Japanese-American survivors ===
It was a common practice before the war for American Issei, or first-generation immigrants, to send their children on extended trips to Japan to study or visit relatives. More Japanese immigrated to the U.S. from Hiroshima than any other prefecture, and Nagasaki also sent many immigrants to Hawai'i and the mainland. There was, therefore, a sizable population of American-born Nisei and Kibei living in their parents' hometowns of Hiroshima and Nagasaki at the time of the atomic bombings. The actual number of Japanese Americans affected by the bombings is unknown – although estimates put approximately 11,000 in Hiroshima city alone – but some 3,000 of them are known to have survived and returned to the U.S. after the war.

A second group of hibakusha counted among Japanese American survivors are those who came to the U.S. in a later wave of Japanese immigration during the 1950s and 1960s. Most in this group were born in Japan and migrated to the U.S. in search of educational and work opportunities that were scarce in post-war Japan. Many were war brides, or Japanese women who had married American men related to the U.S. military's occupation of Japan.

As of 2014, there are about 1,000 recorded Japanese American hibakusha living in the United States. They receive monetary support from the Japanese government and biannual medical checkups with Hiroshima and Nagasaki doctors familiar with the particular concerns of atomic bomb survivors. The U.S. government provides no support to Japanese American hibakusha.

=== Other foreign survivors ===
While one British Commonwealth citizen and seven Dutch POWs (two names known) died in the Nagasaki bombing, at least two POWs reportedly died postwar from cancer thought to have been caused by the atomic bomb. One American POW, the Navajo Joe Kieyoomia, was in Nagasaki at the time of the bombing but survived, reportedly having been shielded from the effects of the bomb by the concrete walls of his cell.

=== Double survivors ===
People who suffered the effects of both bombings are known as nijū hibakusha in Japan. These people were in Hiroshima on 6 August 1945, and within two days managed to reach Nagasaki.

A documentary called Twice Bombed, Twice Survived: The Doubly Atomic Bombed of Hiroshima and Nagasaki was produced in 2006. The producers found 165 people who were victims of both bombings, and the production was screened at the United Nations.

On 24 March 2009, the Japanese government officially recognized Tsutomu Yamaguchi (1916–2010) as a double hibakusha. Yamaguchi was confirmed to be 3 km (1.9 mi) from ground zero in Hiroshima on a business trip when the bomb was detonated. He was seriously burnt on his left side and spent the night in Hiroshima. He got back to his home city of Nagasaki on 8 August, a day before the bomb in Nagasaki was dropped, and he was exposed to residual radiation while searching for his relatives. He was the first officially recognized survivor of both bombings. Yamaguchi died at the age of 93 on 4 January 2010 of stomach cancer.

== Discrimination ==
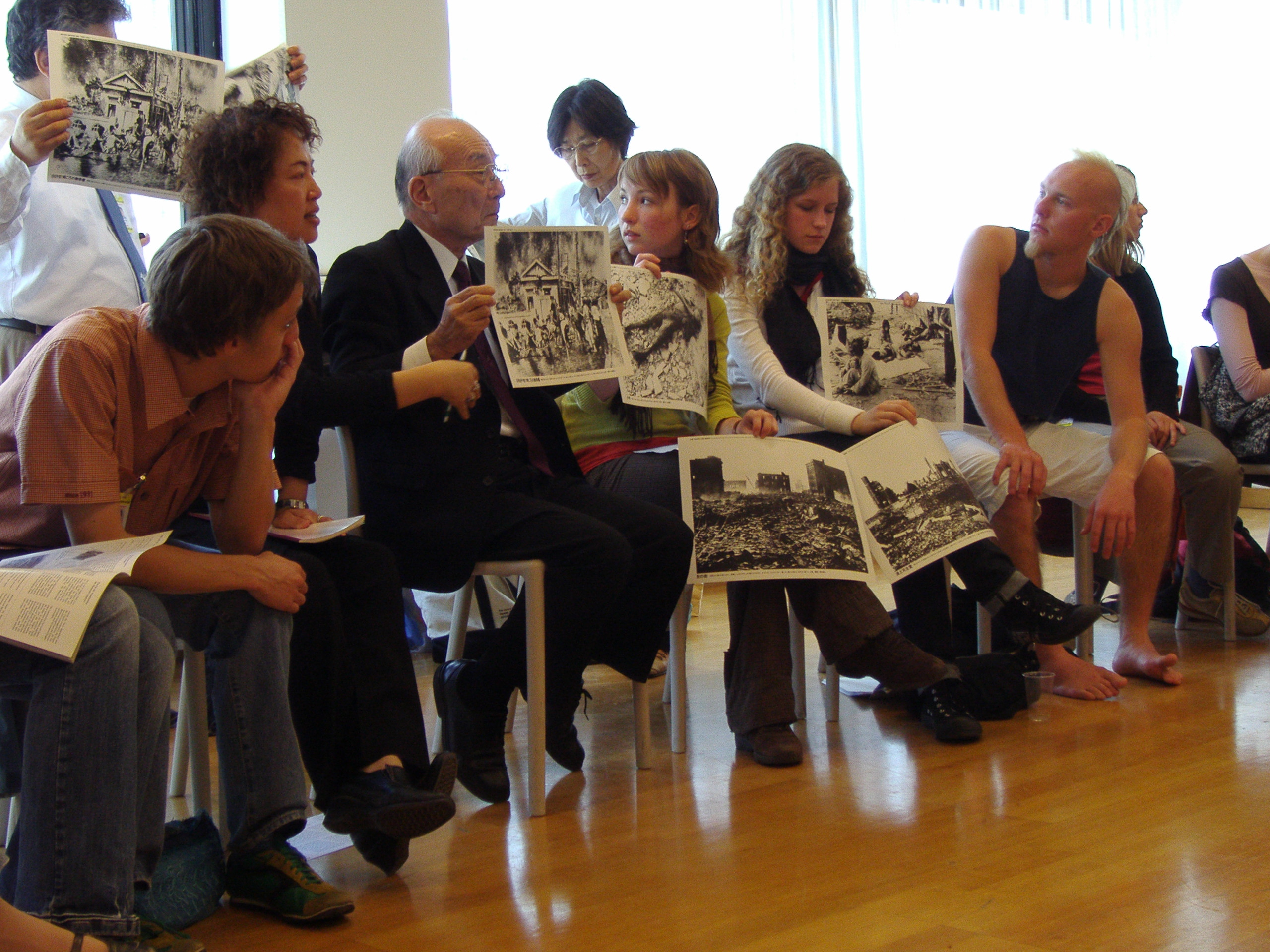
Terumi Tanaka, hibakusha of Nagasaki, tells young people about his experience and shows pictures. United Nations's International Atomic Energy Agency building in Vienna, during the NPT PrepCom 2007.

Hibakusha and their children were (and still are) victims of severe discrimination when it comes to prospects of marriage or work due to public ignorance about the consequences of radiation sickness, with much of the public believing it to be hereditary or even contagious. This is despite the fact that no statistically demonstrable increase of birth defects or congenital malformations was found among the later conceived children born to survivors of the nuclear weapons used at Hiroshima and Nagasaki, or found in the later conceived children of cancer survivors who had previously received radiotherapy. The surviving women of Hiroshima and Nagasaki, who could conceive, and were exposed to substantial amounts of radiation, went on and had children with no higher incidence of abnormalities or birth defects than the rate observed in the Japanese population.

Studs Terkel's book The Good War includes a conversation with two hibakusha. The postscript observes:

There is considerable discrimination in Japan against the hibakusha. It is frequently extended toward their children as well: socially as well as economically. "Not only hibakusha but their children, are refused employment," says Mr. Kito. "There are many among them who do not want it known that they are hibakusha."

— Studs Terkel (1984), The Good War.

The Japan Confederation of A- and H-Bomb Sufferers Organizations (日本被団協, Nihon Hidankyō) is a group formed by hibakusha in 1956 with the goals of pressuring the Japanese government to improve support of the victims and lobbying governments for the abolition of nuclear weapons.

Some estimates are that 140,000 people in Hiroshima (38.9% of the population) and 70,000 people in Nagasaki (28.0% of the population) died in 1945, but how many died immediately as a result of exposure to the blast, heat, or due to radiation, is unknown. One Atomic Bomb Casualty Commission (ABCC) report discusses 6,882 people examined in Hiroshima, and 6,621 people examined in Nagasaki, who were largely within 2000 meters from the hypocenter, who suffered injuries from the blast and heat but died from complications frequently compounded by acute radiation syndrome (ARS), all within about 20–30 days.

In the rare cases of survival for individuals who were in utero at the time of the bombing and yet who still were close enough to be exposed to less than or equal to 0.57 Gy, no difference in their cognitive abilities was found, suggesting a threshold dose for pregnancies below which there is no danger. In 50 or so children who survived the gestational process and were exposed to more than this dose, putting them within about 1000 meters from the hypocenter, microcephaly was observed; this is the only elevated birth defect issue observed in the hibakusha, occurring in approximately 50 in-utero individuals who were situated less than 1000 meters from the bombings.

In a manner dependent on their distance from the hypocenter, in the 1987 Life Span Study, conducted by the Radiation Effects Research Foundation, a statistical excess of 507 cancers, of undefined lethality, were observed in 79,972 hibakusha who had still been living between 1958–1987 and who took part in the study.

An epidemiology study by the RERF estimates that from 1950 to 2000, 46% of leukemia deaths and 11% of solid cancers, of unspecified lethality, could be due to radiation from the bombs, with the statistical excess being estimated at 200 leukemia deaths and 1,700 solid cancers of undeclared lethality.

== Health ==
- Effects of nuclear explosions on human health
- Radiation poisoning

== Notable hibakusha ==
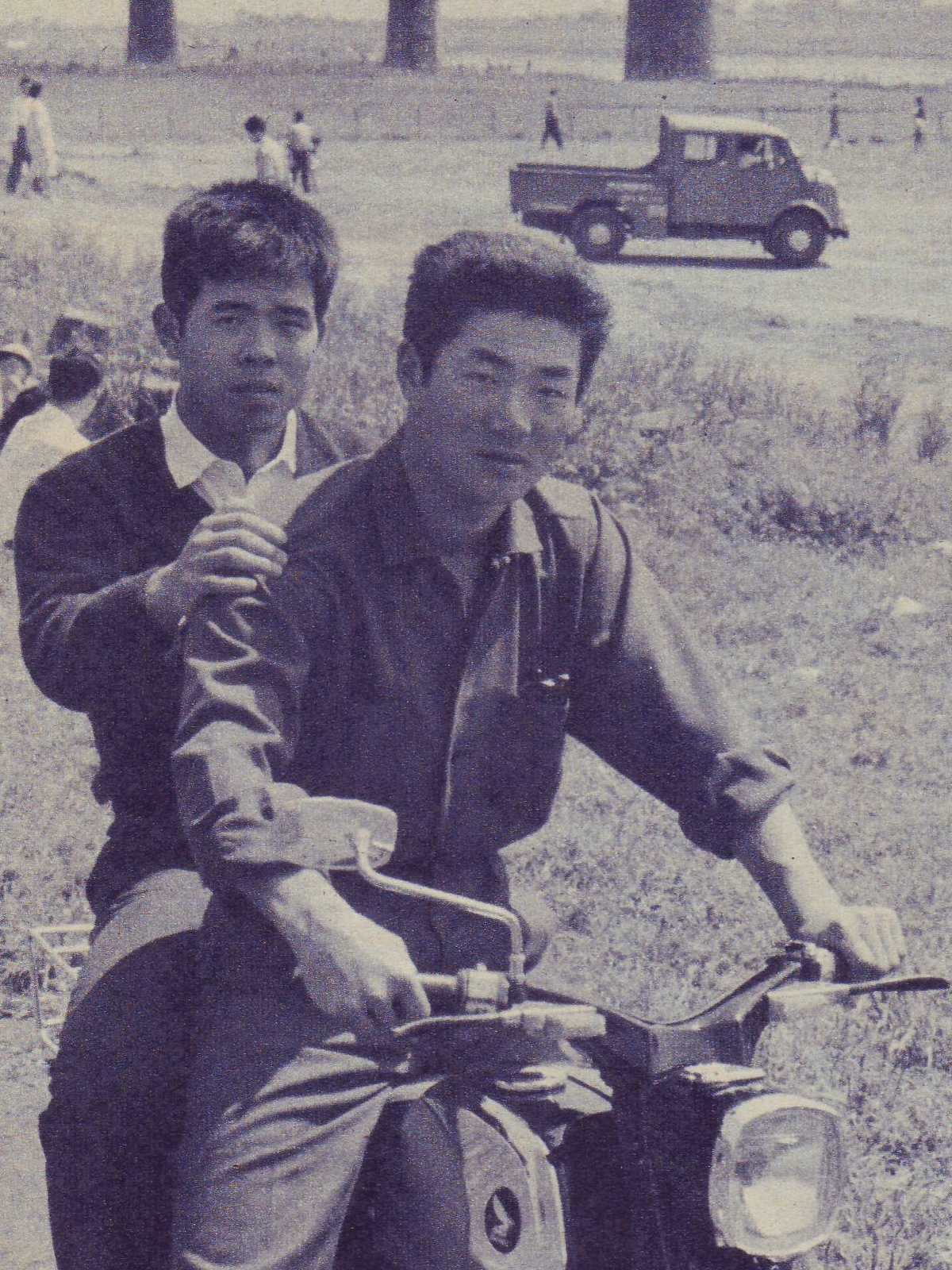
Isao Harimoto, ethnic Korean former Nippon Professional Baseball player and holder of the record for most hits in the Japanese professional leagues. Inducted into the Japanese Baseball Hall of Fame in 1990.

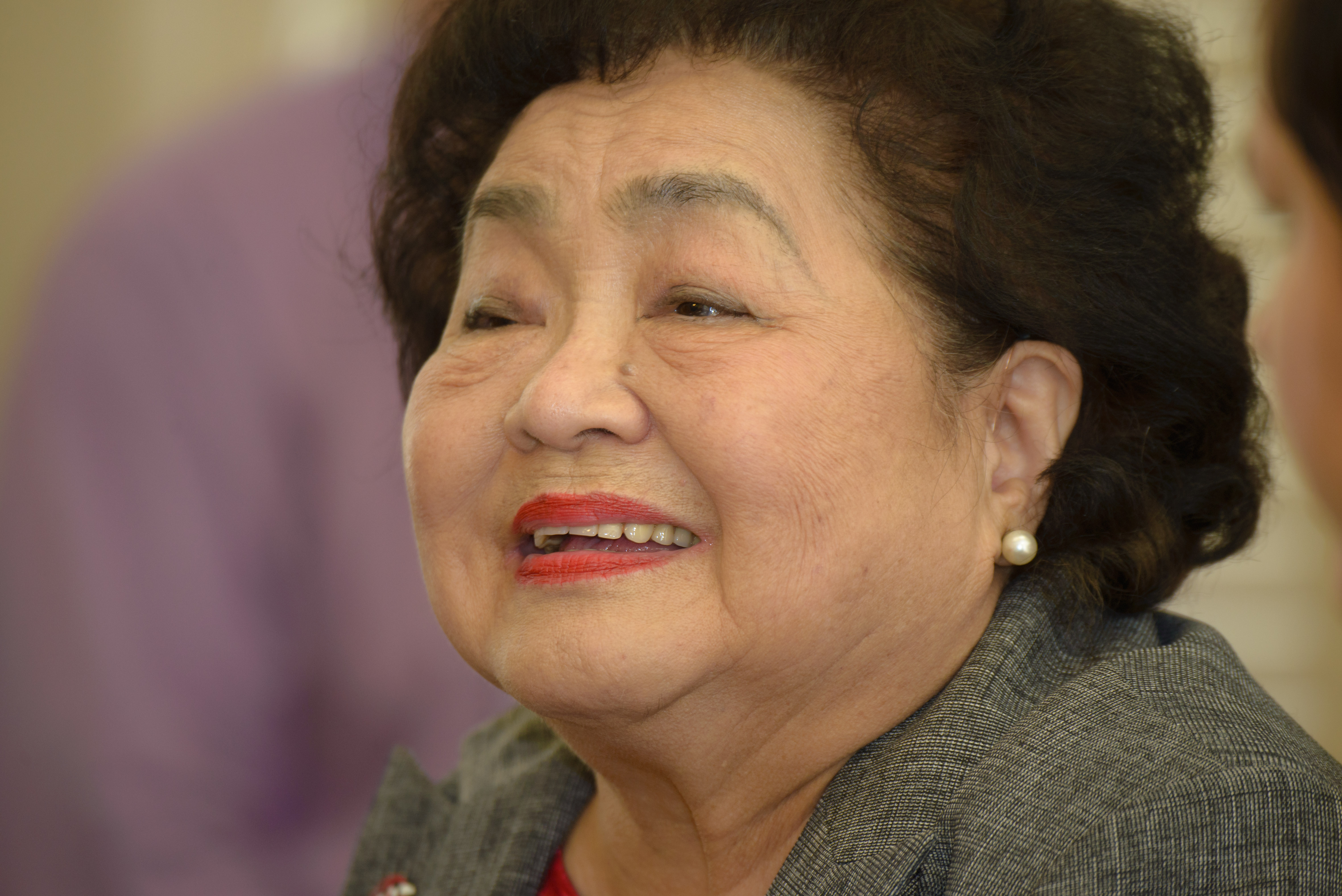
Setsuko Thurlow, Japanese-Canadian anti-nuclear peace activist and ambassador and keynote speaker for the reception of the Nobel Peace Prize of ICAN, 27 October 2017

=== Hiroshima ===
- Eizo Nomura Closest known survivor of either of the blasts. Was 170 m (560 ft) from the hypocenter when the blast occurred. Died in 1982 at age 84.
- Hiroshima Maidens – 25 young women who had surgery in the US after the war
- Hubert Schiffer – Jesuit priest at Hiroshima
- Ikuo Hirayama – hibakusha of Hiroshima at 15 years old, painter
- Isao Harimoto – hibakusha of Hiroshima at 5 years old, ethnic Korean baseball professional player
- Issey Miyake – hibakusha of Hiroshima at 7 years old, clothing designer
- Julia Canny – Irish nun who survived Hiroshima and aided survivors
- Junko Kayashige– hibakusha of Hiroshima at 6 years old, anti-war activist and artist
- Keiji Nakazawa – hibakusha of Hiroshima at 6 years old, author of Barefoot Gen and other anti-war manga.
- Kiyoshi Tanimoto – hibakusha at 36 years old, Methodist minister, anti-nuclear activist, helped Hiroshima Maidens and hibakusha to gain social rights. Peace prize named after him
- Koko Kondo – hibakusha of Hiroshima at 1 year old, notable peace activist and daughter of Reverend Kiyoshi Tanimoto
- Masaru Kawasaki – hibakusha of Hiroshima at 19 years old, composer of the dirge performed at every Hiroshima Peace Memorial Ceremony since 1975
- Michihiko Hachiya – hibakusha of Hiroshima at 42 years old, physician specialized in hibakusha, writer of Hiroshima Diary
- Sadako Kurihara – hibakusha of Hiroshima at 32 years old, poet, anti-nuclear activist, founder of Gensuikin Hiroshima Haha no Kai ('Mothers of Hiroshima')
- Sadako Sasaki – hibakusha at 2 years old, well known for her goal to fold a thousand origami cranes in order to cure herself of leukemia and as a symbol of peace
- Sankichi Tōge – hibakusha at 28 years old, poet and militant
- Setsuko Thurlow – hibakusha of Hiroshima at 13 years old, anti-nuclear activist, ambassador, and keynote speaker at the reception of the Nobel Peace Prize of the International Campaign to Abolish Nuclear Weapons
- Shigeaki Mori – a historian of allied prisoners of war
- Shigeko Sasamori – advocate for peace and nuclear disarmament
- Shigeru Nakamura – hibakusha of Hiroshima at 34 years old, supercentenarian, former oldest living Japanese man (11 January 1911 – 15 November 2022).
- Shinoe Shōda – hibakusha at 34 years old, writer and poet
- Shuntaro Hida – hibakusha of Hiroshima at 28 years old, physician specialized in treating hibakusha
- Sunao Tsuboi – hibakusha of Hiroshima at 20 years old, teacher and activist with Japan Confederation of A- and H-Bomb Sufferers Organizations

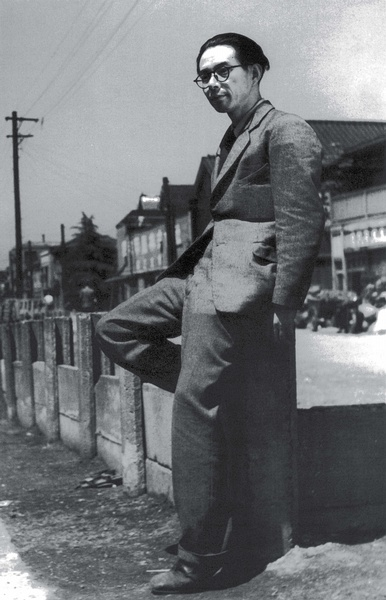
Tamiki Hara, poet, writer and literature professor

- Tamiki Hara – hibakusha of Hiroshima at 39 years old, poet, writer, and university professor
- Tomotaka Tasaka – hibakusha of Hiroshima at 43 years old, film director and scriptwriter
- Toshiko Saiki – hibakusha of Hiroshima at 25, peace activist
- Yoko Ota – hibakusha of Hiroshima at 38 years old, writer
- Yoshito Matsushige – hibakusha of Hiroshima at 32 years old, has taken the only five pictures known the day of the atomic bombing of Hiroshima

=== Nagasaki ===
- Joe Kieyoomia – an American Navajo prisoner of war who survived both the Bataan Death March and the Nagasaki bombing
- Kyoko Hayashi – hibakusha of Nagasaki at 14 years old, writer
- Osamu Shimomura – organic chemist and marine biologist; Nobel Prize in Chemistry in 2008
- Sumiteru Taniguchi – hibakusha at 16 years old, known for a picture of him with his back skinless taken by a Marine; anti-nuclear peace activist, president of the council of the A-Bomb of Nagasaki, co-president of the Japan Confederation of A- and H-Bomb Sufferers Organizations in 2010
- Takashi Nagai – hibakusha of Nagasaki at 38 years old, doctor and author of The Bells of Nagasaki
- Terumi Tanaka – hibakusha of Nagasaki at 13 years old, engineer and associated professor at the University of Tohoku, an activist with Japan Confederation of A- and H-Bomb Sufferers Organizations
- Yōsuke Yamahata – military photographer, not a direct victim of the Bomb but took pictures of Nagasaki the next day. Died of cancer. Can be considered a hibakusha according to the ABCC classification.

=== Hiroshima and Nagasaki ===
- Tsutomu Yamaguchi – the first person officially recognized to have survived both the Hiroshima and Nagasaki atomic bombings.

== Artistic representations and documentaries ==
=== Literature ===
==== Hibakusha literature ====
- Summer Flowers (夏の花 (Natsu no hana)), Tamiki Hara, 1946
- From the Ruins (廃墟から (Haikyo kara)), Tamiki Hara, 1947
- Prelude to Annihilation (壊滅の序曲 (Kaimetsu no jokyoku)), Tamiki Hara, 1949
- City of Corpses (屍の街 (Shikabane no machi)), Yōko Ōta, 1948
- Human Rags (人間襤褸 (Ningen Ranru)), Yōko Ōta, 1951
- Penitence (さんげ (Sange)), Shinoe Shōda, 1947 – collection of tanka poems
- Bringing Forth New Life (生ましめんかな (Umashimenkana)), Sadako Kurihara, 1946
- I, A Hiroshima Witness (私は広島を証言する (Watashi wa Hiroshima wo shogen suru)), Sadako Kurihara, 1967
- Documents about Hiroshima Twenty-Four Years Later (Dokyumento Hiroshima 24 nen), Sadako Kurihara, 1970
- Ritual of Death (祭りの場 (Matsuri no ba)), Kyōko Hayashi, 1975
- Poems of the Atomic Bomb (原爆詩集 (Genbaku shishu)), Sankichi Tōge, 1951
- The bells of Nagasaki (長崎の鐘 (Nagasaki no Kane)), Takashi Nagai, 1949
- Little boy: stories of days in Hiroshima, Shuntaro Hida, 1984
- Letters from the end of the world: a firsthand account of the bombing of Hiroshima, Toyofumi Ogura, 1997
- The day the sun fell – I was 14 years old in Hiroshima, Hashizume Bun, 2007
- Yoko's Diary: The Life of a Young Girl in Hiroshima During World War II, Yoko Hosokawa
- Hiroshima Diary, Michihiko Hachiya, 1955
- One year ago Hiroshima (Genshi bakudan kaiko), Hisashi Tohara, 1946

==== Non-hibakusha literature ====
- Hiroshima Notes (ヒロシマ・ノート (Hiroshima nôto)), Kenzaburô Ooe, 1965
- Black Rain (黒い雨 (Kuroi Ame)), Masuji Ibuse, 1965
- Hiroshima, Makoto Oda, 1981
- Bakushin (爆心), Yūichi Seirai, 2006
- Sadako and the Thousand Paper Cranes, Eleanor Coerr, 1977
- Debu Hiroshima (Ashes of Hiroshima), Othman Puteh and Abdul Razak Abdul Hamid, 1987
- Burnt Shadows, Kamila Shamsie, 2009
- Nagasaki: Life After Nuclear War, Susan Southard, 2015
- Hiroshima, John Hersey, 1946
- Hibakusha (2015 short story)

=== Manga and anime ===
- Barefoot Gen (はだしのゲン (Hadashi no Gen)), Keiji Nakazawa, 1973–1974, 10 volumes (also adapted in film in 1976, 1983 and a TV drama in 2007)
- Town of Evening Calm, Country of Cherry Blossoms (夕凪の街 桜の国 (Yūnagi no Machi, Sakura no Kuni)), Fumiyo Kōno, 2003–2004 (adapted into novel and film in 2007)
- Hibakusha, Steve Nguyen and Choz Belen, 2012
- Bōshi (帽子), Hiroshi Kurosaki, NHK, 2008, 90 minutes
- In This Corner of the World (この世界の片隅に (Kono Sekai no Katasumi ni)), Masao Maruyama, MAPPA, 2016

=== Films ===
- Children of Hiroshima (原爆の子 (Genbaku no Ko)), Kaneto Shindo, 1952
- Frankenstein vs. Baragon (フランケンシュタイン対地底怪獣 (Furankenshutain tai Baragon)), Ishirō Honda and Eiji Tsuburaya, 1965
- Black Rain (黒い雨 (Kuroi Ame)), Shohei Imamura, 1989
- The bells of Nagasaki (長崎の鐘 (Nagasaki no kane)), Hideo Ōba, 1950
- Rhapsody in August (八月の狂詩曲 (Hachigatsu no rapusodī (Hachigatsu no kyōshikyoku))), Akira Kurosawa, 1991
- Hiroshima mon amour, Alain Resnais, 1959
- Hiroshima, Koreyoshi Kurahara and Roger Spottiswoode, 1995
- Touch, Baltasar Kormákur, 2024

=== Music ===
- Silent Planet, Darkstrand (Hibakusha), 2013
- Masaru Kawazaki, March forward for peace, 1966
- Krzysztof Penderecki, Threnody to the Victims of Hiroshima, 1961
- Masao Ohki, Symphony n^{o} 5 "Hiroshima", 1953
- Toshio Hosokawa, Voiceless Voice in Hiroshima, 1989–2001

=== Fine art painting and contemporary arts ===
- The Hiroshima Panels (原爆の図, Genbaku no zu; 1950–1982) a series of painted folding panels by Toshi Maruki and Iri Maruki.
- Hiroshima (1961) by French painter Yves Klein
- Hiroshima shohenzu (広島生変図 ('Hiroshima's holocaust')) (1979), Ikuo Hirayama
- Carl Randall (UK artist who met and painted portraits of hibakusha in Hiroshima, 2006–2009)
- Kei Ito, US-based Japanese artist who created experimental works inspired by his hibakusha grandfather Takeshi Ito and the atomic bombing of Hiroshima.
- Layla Yamamoto, Japanese artist who paints works about US-Japanese history, nuclear weapons, and the atomic bombing of Hiroshima.

=== Performing arts ===
- Hibakusha characters are featured in several Japanese plays including The Elephant by Minoru Betsuyaku

=== Documentaries ===
- No More Hiroshima, Martin Duckworth, 1984
- Hiroshima Witness, Hiroshima Peace Cultural Center and NHK, 1986
- Hiroshima, Paul Wilmshurst, BBC, 2005, 89 minutes
- White Light/Black Rain: The Destruction of Hiroshima and Nagasaki, Steven Okazaki, HBO, 2007, 86 minutes
- Atomic Wounds, Journeyman Pictures, 2008
- Hiroshima: The Real History, Lucy van Beek, Brook Lapping Productions 2015
- Als die Sonne vom Himmel fiel, Aya Domenig, 2015, 78 minutes
- Hiroshima Ground Zero: Eyewitness Accounts of 78 A-Bomb Survivors, NHK, 2025

== See also ==
- Atomic veteran
- Atomic People
- Castle Bravo
- Doomsday clock
- Fat Man
- H Bomb
- Hibakujumoku
- Hiroshima Peace memorial park
- Little Boy
- Manhattan project
- Nihon Hidankyo
- Preparatory Commission for the Comprehensive Nuclear-Test-Ban Treaty Organization (CTBTO)
- SCOJ 2005 No.1977
- Treaty on the Prohibition of Nuclear Weapons – Preamble
