= Shuntaro Hida =

Japanese physician

- 肥田 舜太郎
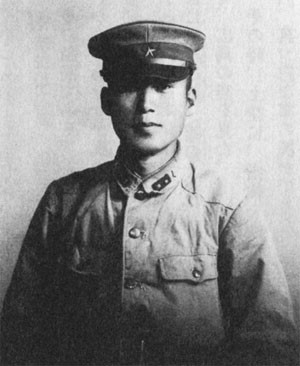
- Born: January 1, 1917; Hiroshima, Japan
- Died: March 20, 2017 (aged 100)
- Education: Nihon University
- Military career
- Allegiance: Empire of Japan
- Branch: Imperial Japanese Army
- Service years: 1944–1945
- Rank: Medical officer
- Unit: Hiroshima Military Hospital
- Conflicts: World War II
- Other work: Physician

Shuntaro Hida (肥田舜太郎, Hida Shuntaro; January 1, 1917 – March 20, 2017) was a Japanese physician who was an eyewitness when the Little Boy atomic bomb was dropped on Hiroshima by the Enola Gay on 6 August 1945. He treated survivors as a medical doctor and wrote about the effects of radiation on the human body.

== Medical officer ==
Hida was born on the 1 January 1917, in Hiroshima. He studied medicine under the Imperial Japanese Army, graduating in 1944. Hida was serving as a medical officer and was 28 years old when the Little Boy bomb was dropped. He had been assigned to Hiroshima Military Hospital. The night before the bomb was dropped, Hida had been called out to attend to a sick young child in a nearby village of Hesaka. He was therefore approximately 6 kilometers from ground zero when the bomb was dropped and he looked up and saw the Boeing B-29 Superfortress aircraft which he described as appearing like a "tiny silver drop". He was dazzled by the flash and was stuck by the heat from the blast. It took several moments for the blast to hit him and when it did, Hida was thrown back around 10 meters.

He borrowed a bicycle to rush back to Hiroshima and witnessed injured victims wandering down the roads. People were so badly burned that he mistook one woman as wearing tattered clothing hanging from her body, only to realise it was her sloughed off skin. The ride to the Hiroshima Military Hospital took three hours, but when he arrived the building was consumed by fire. He decided to return to Hesaka, assuming that he may be able to care for survivors there, as it was the closest village. A field hospital has been set up at the local school and he began working around the clock to treat survivors. Three days after the bomb, Hida began witnessing the effects of acute radiation syndrome on survivors. Their fevers were so severe that Hida initially thought his thermometers were broken. He found that their breath smelt incredibly bad and when he asked them to open their mouths, they were black. He found that the bacteria in their mouths had multiplied profusely due to their white blood cells being wiped out, causing the inside of their mouths to rot.

Hida believes he treated around 6,000-10,000 patients during this time.

== Post-war ==
After the war Hida began practicing medicine in Tokyo, setting up his own clinic in 1950. He continued to treat atomic bomb survivors (known as Hibakusha) and claimed to have faced harassment from US military forces during this time, as the US had forbidden Japanese doctors from researching or talking to victims about the symptoms associated with the atomic bomb. He was arrested four times by the occupying US forces.

He later became the Director of the Central Counseling Office of Nihon Hidankyo. He also sought compensation from the United States government and advocated the abolition of nuclear weapons.

As a result of his exposure to the atomic bomb, Hida suffered ill health. He underwent several surgeries on his lower back and resorted to crawling around due to the pain. Aged 80, his back pain began improving after he began walking in water at a swimming pool.

Hida retired in 2009, aged 92. His wife died in 2015; so Hida moved in with his son and daughter-in-law. He died from pneumonia on 20 March 2017 at the age of 100.

== In Media ==
- 2005 Hiroshima: He is interviewed in the BBC drama documentary and shares his experiences which are re-enacted in a dramatic reconstruction of events.
- 2006 White Light/Black Rain: The Destruction of Hiroshima and Nagasaki: A documentary in which he is interviewed.
- 2015 Als die Sonne vom Himmel fiel (The Day The Sun Fell / 太陽が落ちた日): A documentary in which he is interviewed.
