= Layla Yamamoto =

Japanese contemporary artist and painter (born 1995)

Layla Yamamoto (山本れいら, Reira Yamamoto; born 1995) is a Japanese contemporary artist who specializes in paintings often focused on themes relating to feminism, women's rights, Japanese pop culture (including anime and manga), and Japan's history during and after WWII.

== Life and career ==
Born in Tokyo in 1995, Yamamoto moved to the United States as a teenager. She later attended the School of the Art Institute of Chicago before returning to Tokyo. During her time in the US, her work began to reflect the history between Japan and the US, including the theme of nuclear power and weaponry, drawing from the experiences of the hibakusha from her family in Hiroshima.

At the end of 2021, her first solo exhibition (titled "After the Quake") opened in Nihonbashi Mitsukoshimae, presenting works focused on Japan-US politics and history from the atomic bombings to the Fukushima nuclear accident. In 2025, she curated an exhibition (titled "In the beginning, Womankind was the sun - Weren't we?"), featuring works by herself and fellow artists Yoshiko Shimada and Namae Myoji that focus on the history of women's rights in Japan, drawing inspiration from Hiratsuka Raichō as well as Japan's imperial legacy.
