= Masamoto Nasu =

Japanese children's writer (1942–2021)

Masamoto Nasu (Japanese: 那須正幹, romanized: Nasu Masamoto; 6 June 1942 – 22 July 2021) was a Japanese children's writer.

== Biography ==
Nasu was born in Hiroshima. When he was three years old, he survived the atomic bombing of the city by the United States on 6 August 1945; the hypocenter was three kilometers from his home.

He studied forest entomology at the Shimane Agricultural University and worked as an office worker in Tokyo before returning to Hiroshima. His writing debut was in 1972, with Kubinashi jizo no takara (The treasure of the headless jizo).

In 1978 he started to write the series of books Zukkoke sannin-gumi (The funny trio), featuring the adventures of three elementary school children: Hachibei, Hakase and Moo-chan. The series, published until 2004, became a hit, spanning fifty books which sold more than 25 million copies in Japan; it was made into a feature film, an anime and a television series.

Nasu wrote often about the aftermath of the atomic bombings, opposing war and advocating peace. Two of his books were translated to English: the 1984 memoir Children of the Paper Crane: The Story of Sadako Sasaki and Her Struggle with the A-Bomb Disease and the 1995 picture book Hiroshima: A tragedy never to be repeated.

Nasu died on 22 July 2021, in Hofu, Yamaguchi Prefecture.
