= Julia Canny =

Irish Sister of the Holy Souls

Julia Canny (1894–1987) was an Irish Sister of the Holy Souls who survived the atomic bombing of Hiroshima.

== Early life ==
Julia Canny was born to a poor farming family in Clonbur, Co. Galway in 1894. She only had a fifth-grade education. Canny emigrated to the US in 1921, joining the Society of the Helpers of the Holy Souls in New York in 1933. She embarked for Japan in 1939 from San Francisco. After Pearl Harbor, she was interned on the presumption of being an American, but released after six months when it was demonstrated by the Swiss ambassador that she was an Irish citizen.

== Hiroshima ==
On 6 August 1945, Canny had been sitting outside the Sisters of the Holy Souls convent when the atomic bomb was dropped. She and the other sisters took shelter in the convent, but had to run back out moments later when it collapsed. They later took shelter in a Jesuit chapel four kilometres away and helped 90 other survivors who had gathered there.

Other than Aidan MacCarthy, Canny was one of the few Irish citizens to witness the detonation of the world’s first atomic bomb to be used in warfare.

== Later life ==
Canny never returned to Ireland, and was bed-ridden for the last years of her life. She died on 1 November 1987 in Tokyo.

== See also ==
- Hibakusha
