= Theodore Van Kirk =

US Army Air Forces navigator; recipient of the Silver Star

Theodore J. Van Kirk
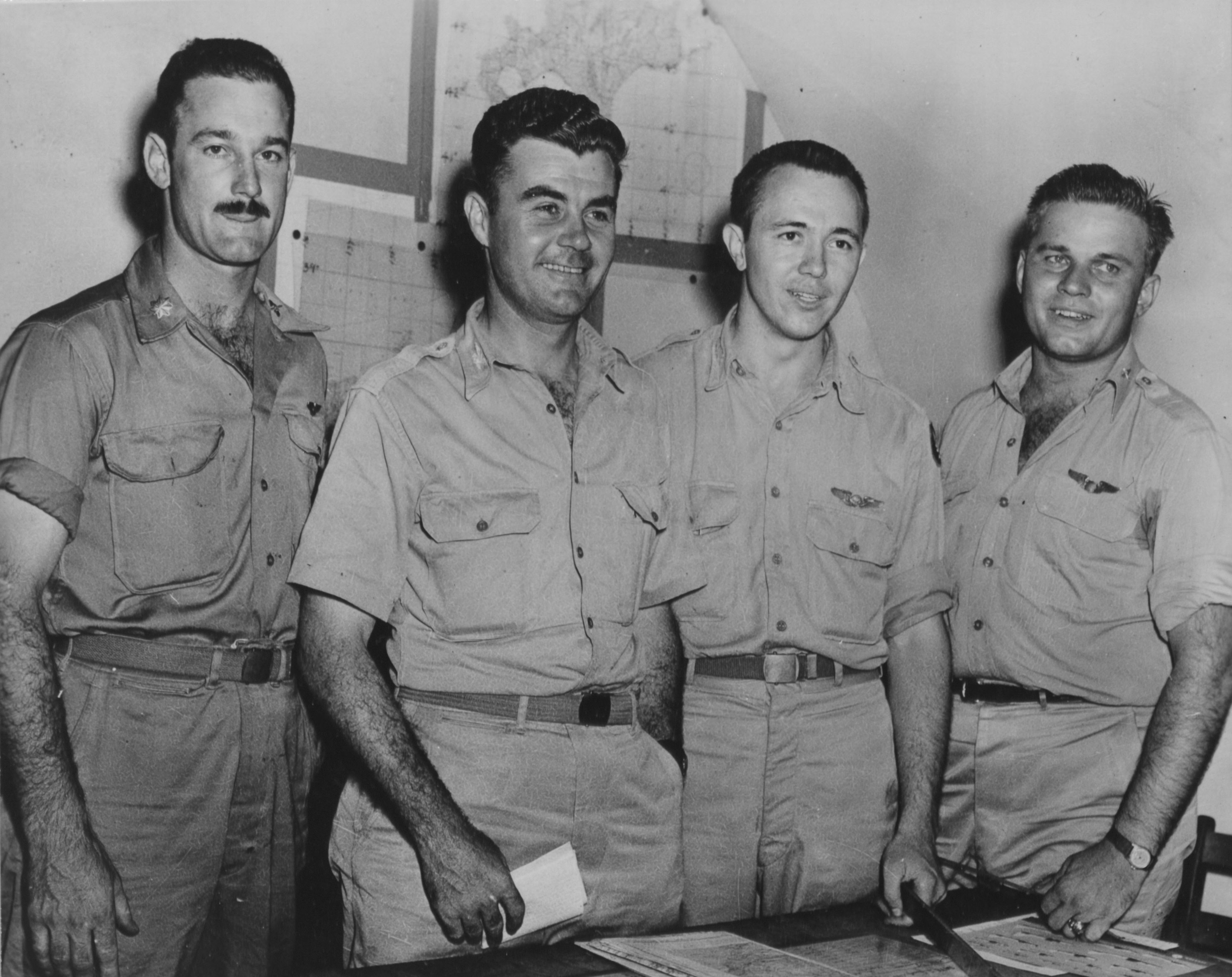
- Van Kirk (second from right)
- Born: February 27, 1921; Northumberland, Pennsylvania, U.S.
- Died: July 28, 2014 (aged 93); Stone Mountain, Georgia, U.S.
- Military career
- Allegiance: United States
- Branch: United States Army
- Service years: 1941–1946
- Rank: Major
- Nicknames: "Dutch", "Ted"
- Units: 97th Bomb Group; 509th Bomb Wing
- Conflicts: World War II
- Awards: Silver Star; Distinguished Flying Cross; Air Medal (15)

Theodore Jerome "Dutch" Van Kirk (February 27, 1921 – July 28, 2014) was a navigator in the United States Army Air Forces, best known as the navigator of the Enola Gay when it dropped the first atomic bomb on Hiroshima. Upon the death of fellow crewman Morris Jeppson on March 30, 2010, Van Kirk became the last surviving member of the Enola Gay crew.

== Career ==
Van Kirk was born in Northumberland, Pennsylvania, to Frederick and Grace (Snyder) Van Kirk. He joined the Army Air Force Aviation Cadet Program in October 1941. On 1 April 1942, he received both his commission and navigator wings and transferred to the 97th Bomb Group, the first operational Boeing B-17 Flying Fortress unit in England. The crew of the "Red Gremlin" also included pilot Paul Tibbets and bombardier Tom Ferebee. Van Kirk would later fly with these men on the Hiroshima mission.

From August to October 1942, the crew flew 11 missions out of England. They were the lead aircraft, responsible for group navigation and bombing. In October 1942, they flew General Mark Clark to Gibraltar for his secret North African rendezvous with the French prior to Operation Torch. In November, they ferried General Eisenhower to Gibraltar to command the North African invasion forces. After German reinforcements began pouring into the port of Bizerte, Tunisia, posing a serious threat to Allied strategy, a new mission emerged. On 16 November 1942, the crew led their group in an attack that took the Germans by surprise at Sidi Ahmed Air Base at Bizerte.

=== Atomic bombing of Japan ===
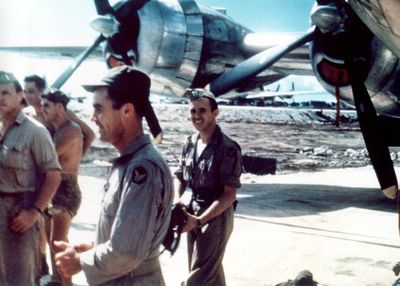
Van Kirk (center) and the rest of the Enola Gay flight crew upon return from their mission over Hiroshima (6 August 1945)

Van Kirk returned to the U.S. in June 1943 after flying a total of 58 missions overseas. He served as an instructor navigator until reuniting with Tibbets and Ferebee in the 509th Composite Group at Wendover Field, Utah, in late 1944. The group flew the Boeing B-29 Superfortress, with Tibbets as commander and Van Kirk as the group navigator. From November 1944 to June 1945 they trained continually for the first atomic bomb drop, which occurred 6 August 1945.

The thirteen-hour mission to Hiroshima began at 02:45 hrs in the morning Tinian time. By the time they rendezvoused with their accompanying B-29s at 0607 hrs over Iwo Jima, the group was three hours from the target area. As they approached the target Van Kirk worked closely with the bombardier, Tom Ferebee, to confirm the winds and aimpoint. The bomb fell away from the aircraft at 09:15:17 Tinian time. Van Kirk later participated in Operation Crossroads, the first Bikini Atoll atomic bomb tests. According to the 1995 New York Times interview by Gustav Niebuhr Mr. Van Kirk said he was often asked, "given a choice about his role in the Hiroshima bombing, would he do it again?":

Under the same circumstances – and the key words are "the same circumstances" yes, I would do it again. We were in a war for five years. [sic] We were fighting an enemy that had a reputation for never surrendering, never accepting defeat. It's really hard to talk about morality and war in the same sentence. In a war, there are so many questionable things done. Where was the morality in the bombing of Coventry, or the bombing of Dresden, or the Bataan Death March, or the Rape of Nanking, or the bombing of Pearl Harbor? I believe that when you're in a war, a nation must have the courage to do what it must to win the war with a minimum loss of lives.

In October 2007, Van Kirk auctioned off the flight log he kept on board the Enola Gay during the atomic bombing of Hiroshima for US$358,500 in a public auction. Van Kirk stated he decided to sell the log, because he wanted it to be kept at a museum. The auction house did not reveal the name of the successful bidder, although it said it was a U.S. citizen.

== Later life ==
In August 1946 Van Kirk completed his service in the Army Air Forces as a Major. His decorations include the Silver Star, the Distinguished Flying Cross, and 15 Air Medals. Van Kirk went on to receive his Bachelor and Master of Science degrees in Chemical Engineering from Bucknell University in 1949 and 1950. For the next 35 years, he held various technical and managerial positions in research and marketing with DuPont.

Dutch Van Kirk appeared April 9–10, 2005 at the MacDill Air Force Base Air Fest, Tampa, FL, filling in for scheduled Paul Tibbets, who was ailing.

Van Kirk was present at the 2008 Thunder over Michigan Air Show.

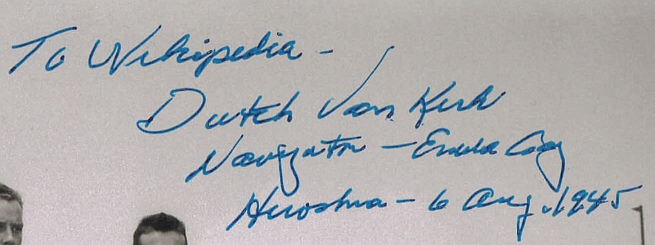
On August 21, 2010 Van Kirk appeared at a gun and knife collector's show in Dallas, Texas where his autograph was obtained, dedicated "To Wikipedia".

On Friday, April 9, 2010 Van Kirk spoke at the University of West Georgia in the Biology Building Lecture Hall. It was billed as "Lone Survivor of Enola Gay Visits UWG".

On September 3, 2010 Major Van Kirk, accompanied by his wife, appeared at the model air show "Warbirds Over Atlanta 2010" in Ball Ground, Georgia where he signed his books and photographs as a replica of the B-29 flew overhead.

Van Kirk appeared and signed books at the Vectren Dayton Air Show on July 8, 2012.

Van Kirk appeared at the Marietta Museum of History on August 11–12, 2012. He signed his book, My True Course, from 11 a.m. to 3 p.m. on both Saturday and Sunday at the museum's Aviation Wing. On Saturday, August 11 at 4 p.m., he gave a rare address at the main wing of the museum.

On September 14, 2013, Major Van Kirk visited and spoke at the Frontiers of Flight Museum in Dallas, Texas. He spoke for about an hour about his experience in the service, and afterwards, he signed copies of his book, My True Course. During this event, Mr. Van Kirk relayed stories about both his practice bombing runs in America and his real bombing missions abroad. He was asked to describe the difference between the practice and real missions, and he replied, "In America, they're not shooting at you!"

On September 15, 2013, he spoke for approximately an hour and answered questions about his military service and specifically his role as the navigator on the Enola Gay at the Cavanaugh Flight Museum in Addison, Texas. Afterward, he signed copies of his book, My True Course.

Van Kirk died on July 28, 2014. He was survived by his four children.

== Awards and decorations ==
His decorations include:

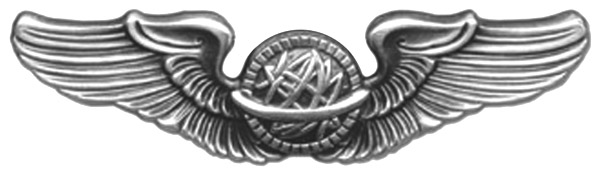

USAAF Navigator Badge
Silver Star
Distinguished Flying Cross	Air Medal with two silver and two bronze oak leaf clusters	Air Medal with bronze oak leaf cluster (second ribbon required for accoutrement spacing)
Air Force Outstanding Unit Award with "V" device	American Defense Service Medal	American Campaign Medal
Asiatic-Pacific Campaign Medal with two bronze campaign stars	European-African-Middle Eastern Campaign Medal with two bronze campaign stars	World War II Victory Medal

=== Silver Star citation ===
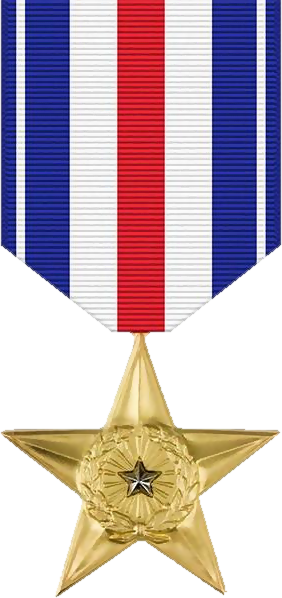

Van Kirk, Theodore J.
Captain, U.S. Army Air Forces
393d Bombardment Squadron, 509th Composite Group, 20th Air Force
Date of Action: August 6, 1945
Headquarters, 20th Air Force, General Orders No. 69 (September 22, 1945)
Citation:

Captain (Air Corps) Theodore J. Van Kirk, United States Army Air Forces, for gallantry in action while engaged in aerial flight against the Japanese Empire on 6 August 1945. Captain Van Kirk was Navigator for a combat crew of the B-29 aircraft of the 393d Bombardment Squadron, 509th Composite Group, 20th Air Force, which flew from a base in the Marianas Islands to drop on the city of Hiroshima, Japan, the first atomic bomb to be used in warfare. Flying 1500 miles over open water to the coast of Japan, they manned their assigned positions and crossed the island of Shikoku and the Inland Sea. They constantly faced the danger of being hit by anti-aircraft fire [sic], enemy fighters [sic], or suffering mechanical or other failures which would intensify the risks of carrying this powerful missile. Throughout the mission the element of hazard from the unknown prevailed, for this was the first time that this bomb, much more destructive than any other in existence, had been dropped from an airplane. The effect it would have on the airplane and these crew members was only to be estimated. Shortly after 0900 they brought the plane in over the city, and at 0915 the bomb release was pressed. The bomb cleared, and fell toward the planned objective. They then headed from the area and, despite a minor effect from the detonation, returned safely to their home base. By their courage and skillful performance of duty achieved in outstanding fashion despite the dangers involved in accomplishment of this historic mission, these individuals distinguished themselves by extraordinary achievement and reflect great credit on themselves and the Army Air Forces.

== See also ==
- White Light/Black Rain: The Destruction of Hiroshima and Nagasaki (2007)
