= Effects of nuclear explosions on human health =

The medical effects of the atomic bomb upon humans can be put into the four categories below, with the effects of larger thermonuclear weapons producing blast and thermal effects so large that there would be a negligible number of survivors close enough to the center of the blast who would experience prompt/acute radiation effects, which were observed after the 16 kiloton yield Hiroshima bomb, due to its relatively low yield:

- Initial stage—the first 1–9 weeks, in which are the greatest number of deaths, with 90% due to thermal injury and/or blast effects and 10% due to super-lethal radiation exposure.
- Intermediate stage—from 10 to 12 weeks. The deaths in this period are from ionizing radiation in the median lethal range - LD_{50}
- Late period—lasting from 13 to 20 weeks. This period has some improvement in survivors' condition.
- Delayed period—from 20+ weeks. Characterized by numerous complications, mostly related to healing of thermal and mechanical injuries, and if the individual was exposed to a few hundred to a thousand millisieverts of radiation, it is coupled with infertility, sub-fertility and blood disorders. Furthermore, ionizing radiation above a dose of around 50-100 millisievert exposure has been shown to statistically begin increasing a person's chance of dying of cancer sometime in their lifetime over the normal unexposed rate of c. 25%, in the long term, a heightened rate of cancer, proportional to the dose received, would begin to be observed after c. 5+ years, with lesser problems, such as eye cataracts, and other more minor effects in other organs and tissue also being observed over the long term.

Depending on whether individuals further afield shelter in place or evacuate perpendicular to the direction of the wind, and therefore avoid contact with the fallout plume, and stay there for the days and weeks after the nuclear explosion, their exposure to fallout, and therefore their total dose, will vary. Those who do shelter in place and/or evacuate would experience a total dose that would be negligible in comparison to someone who just went about their life as normal.

Some scientists estimate that if there were a nuclear war resulting in 100 Hiroshima-size nuclear explosions on cities, it could cause significant loss of life in the tens of millions from long term climatic effects alone. The climatology hypothesis is that if each city firestorms, a great deal of soot could be thrown up into the atmosphere which could blanket the earth, cutting out sunlight for years on end, causing the disruption of food chains, in what is termed a nuclear winter scenario.

== Blast effects — the initial stage ==
=== Immediate post-attack period ===
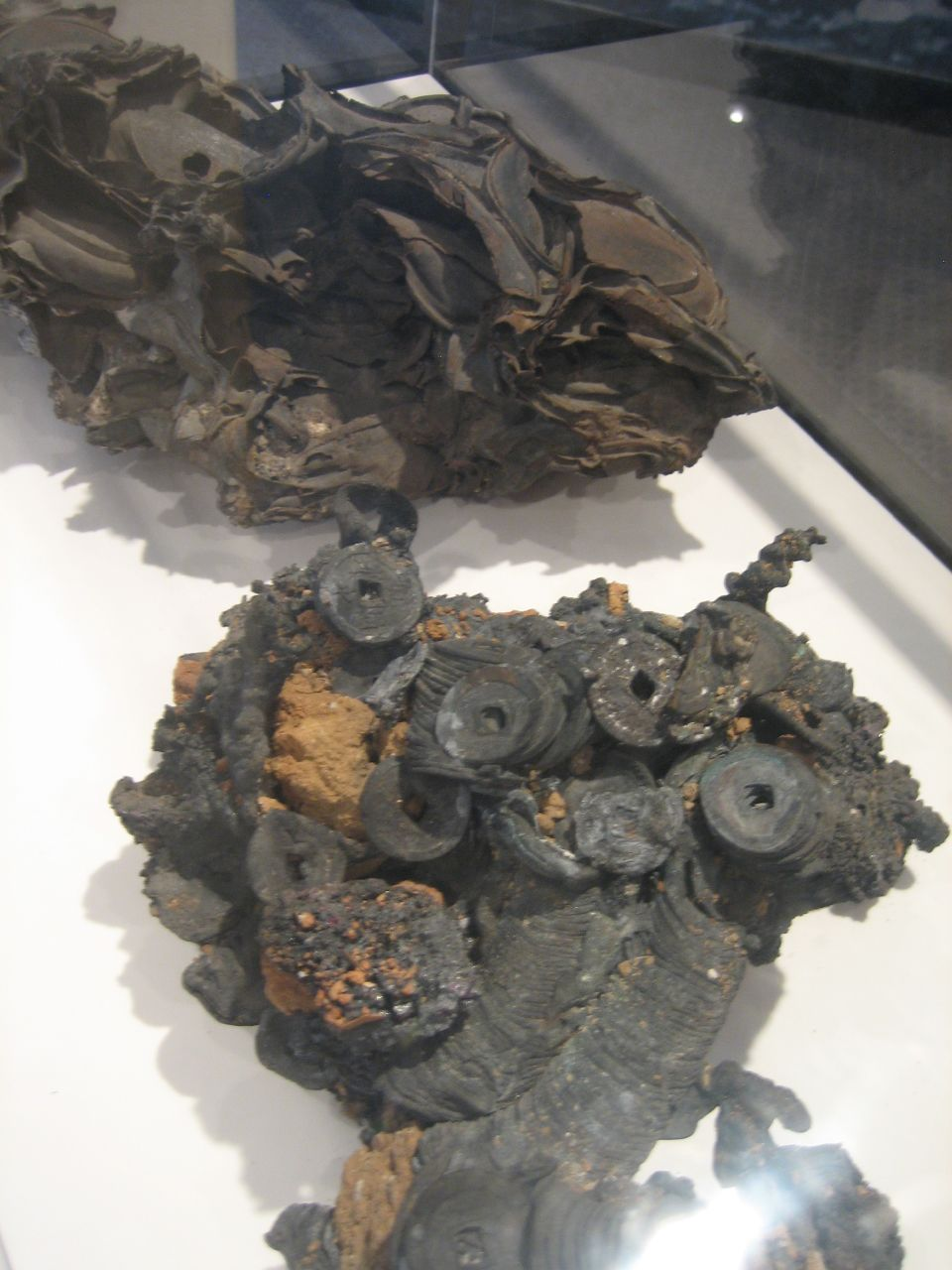
Melted and fused pieces of metal (including coins that were in people's pockets) from the Atomic bombings of Japan. The melting of metal like this occurred during the ensuing fires and firestorms, long after the bombs had exploded.

The main causes of death and disablement in this state are thermal burns and the failure of structures resulting from the blast effect. Injury from the pressure wave is minimal in contrast because the human body can survive up to 2 bar (30 psi) while most buildings can withstand only a 0.8 bar (12 psi) blast. Therefore, the fate of humans is closely related to the survival of the buildings around them.

=== Fate within certain peak overpressure ===
- over 0.8 bar (12 psi) - 98% dead, 2% injured
- 0.3 - 0.8 bar (5-12 psi) - 50% dead, 40% injured, 10% safe
- 0.14 - 0.3 bar (2-5 psi) - 5% dead, 45% injured, 50% safe

== Types of radioactive exposure after a nuclear attack ==
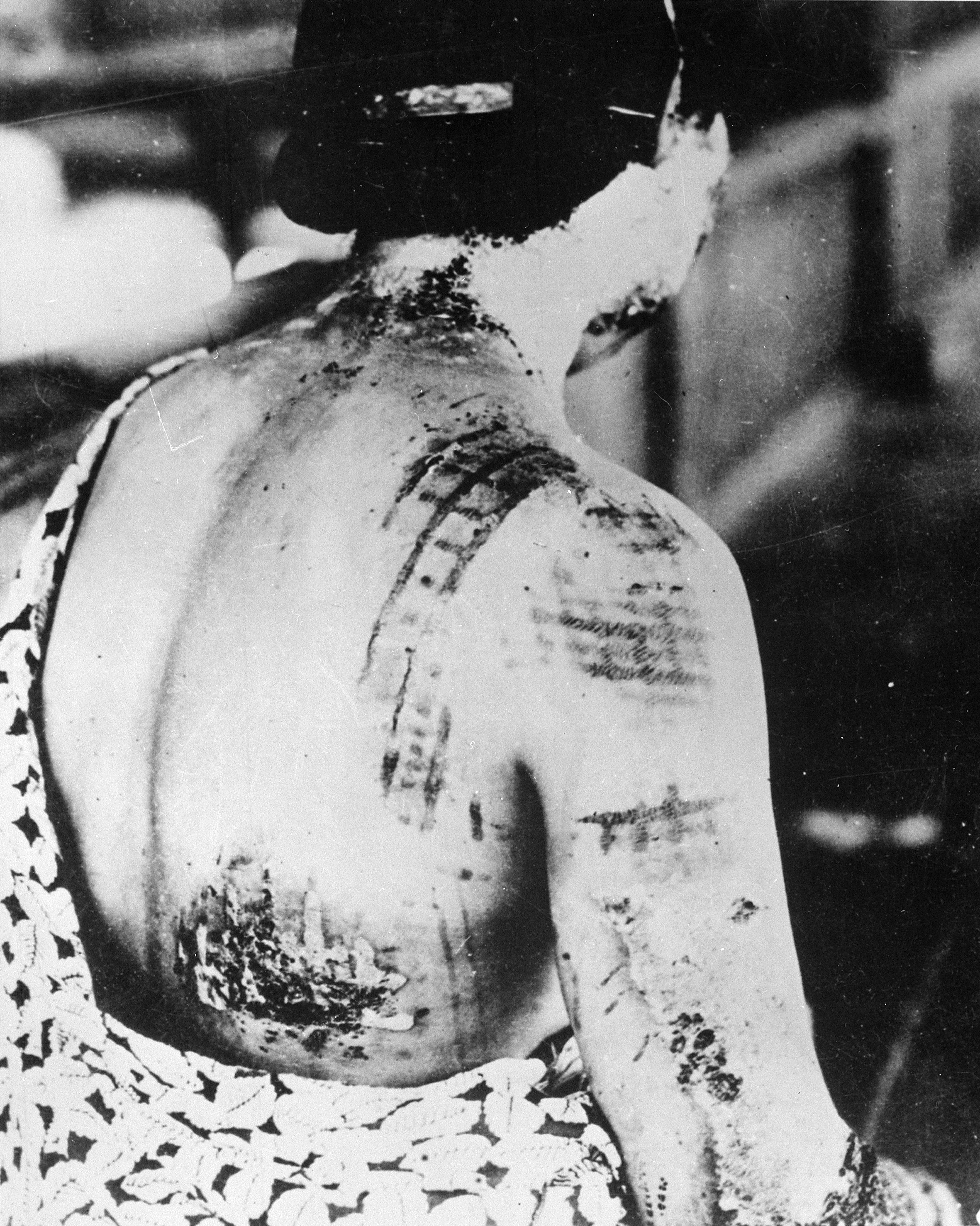
Japanese woman (one of the Hiroshima Maidens) with burns from thermal radiation after the United States dropped nuclear bombs on Japan.

In a nuclear explosion, the human body can experience varying types of radiation. This radiation can be classified into two groups: initial radiation and residual radiation. Initial radiation is emitted during the initial explosion, which releases short-term radionuclides. The residual radiation is emitted after the initial attack from materials that were impacted by the detonation. These materials let off nuclear radiation in the form of residual radiation. In the event of a nuclear attack, a human body can be irradiated by at least three processes. The first, and most significant, cause of burns is thermal radiation and not caused by ionizing radiation.

- Thermal burns from infrared heat radiation, these would be the most common burn type experienced by people.
- If people come in direct contact with fallout, beta burns from shallow ionizing beta radiation will be experienced. The largest particles (visible to the naked eye) in local fallout would be likely to have very high radioactivity because they would be deposited so soon after detonation; this fraction of the total fallout is called the prompt or local fallout fraction. It is likely that one such particle upon the skin would be able to cause a localized beta burn. This local fallout, termed Bikini snow after the Pacific island weapon tests, was experienced by the crew on the deck of the Lucky Dragon fishing ship following the explosion of the 15 megaton Shrimp device in the Castle Bravo event. However, these particular decay particles (beta particles) are very weakly penetrating and have a short range, requiring almost direct contact between fallout and personnel to be harmful.
- Rarer still would be personnel who experience radiation burns from highly penetrating gamma radiation. This would likely cause deep gamma penetration within the body, which would result in uniform whole body irradiation rather than only a surface burn. In cases of whole body gamma irradiation (c. 10 Gy) due to accidents involving medical product irradiators, some human subjects developed injuries to their skin between the time of irradiation and death.

In the picture above, the clothing (a kimono) that the woman was wearing attenuated the far reaching thermal radiation; the kimono, however, would naturally have been unable to attenuate any gamma radiation, if she were close enough to the weapon to have experienced any, and it would be likely that any such penetrating radiation effect would be evenly applied to her entire body. Beta burns would likely be all over the body if there was contact with fallout after the explosion, unlike thermal burns, which are only ever on one side of the body, as heat radiation infrared naturally does not penetrate the human body. In addition, the pattern on her clothing has been burnt into the skin by the thermal radiation. This is because white fabric reflects more visible and infrared light than dark fabric. As a result, the skin underneath dark fabric is burned more than the skin covered by white clothing.

There is also the risk of internal radiation poisoning by ingestion of fallout particles, if one is in a fallout zone.

== Radiation poisoning ==
"About Fallout" (1955) - Official U.S. Civil Defense information film reel.

Radiation poisoning, also called "radiation sickness" or a "creeping dose", is a form of damage to organ tissue due to excessive exposure to ionizing radiation. The term is generally used to refer to acute problems caused by a large dosage of radiation in a short period, though this also has occurred with long-term exposure to low-level radiation. Many of the symptoms of radiation poisoning occur as ionizing radiation interferes with cell division. There are numerous lethal radiation syndromes, including prodromal syndrome, bone marrow death, central nervous system death and gastrointestinal death.

=== Prodromal syndrome ===
The "prodromal syndrome" is not a diagnosis, but the technical term used by health professionals to describe a specific group of symptoms that may precede the onset of an illness. For example, a fever is "prodromal" to measles, which means that a fever may be a risk factor for developing this illness. The prodromal symptoms for radiation poisoning can include symptoms such as feelings of nausea, increased thirst, loss of appetite, discomfort, fever, and diarrhea.

=== Bone marrow death ===
Bone marrow death is caused by a dose of radiation between 2 and 10 Gray and is characterized by the part of the bone marrow that makes the blood being broken down. Therefore, production of red and white blood cells and platelets is stopped due to loss of the blood-making stem cells (4.5 Gray kills 95% of stem cells). The loss of platelets greatly increases the chance of fatal hemorrhage, while the lack of white blood cells causes infections; the fall in red blood cells is minimal, and only causes mild anemia.

The exposure to 4.5 Gray of penetrating gamma rays has many effects that occur at different times:

In 24 hours:

- vomiting
- diarrhea

These will usually abate after 6–7 days.

Within 3–4 weeks there is a period of extreme illness.

- severe bloody diarrhea, indicating intestinal disorders causing fluid imbalance
- extensive internal bleeding
- sepsis infections

The peak incidence of acute BM death corresponds to the 30-day nadir in blood cell numbers. The number of deaths then falls progressively until it reaches 0 at 60 days after irradiation. The amount of radiation greatly affects the probability of death. For example, over the range of 2 to 6 Gray the probability of death in untreated adults goes from about 1% to 99%, but these figures are for healthy adults. Therefore, results may differ, because of the thermal and mechanical injuries and infectious conditions.

=== Gastrointestinal death ===
Gastrointestinal death is caused by a dose of radiation between 10 and 50 Gray. Whole body doses cause damage to epithelial cells lining the gastrointestinal tract and this combined with the bone marrow damage is fatal. All symptoms become increasingly severe, causing exhaustion and emaciation in a few days and death within 7–14 days from loss of water and electrolytes.

The symptoms of gastrointestinal death are:

- gastrointestinal pain
- anorexia
- nausea
- vomiting
- diarrhea

=== Central nervous system death ===
Central nervous system death is the main cause of death in 24–48 hours among those exposed to 50 Gray.

The symptoms are:

- vomiting
- nausea
- diarrhea
- drowsiness
- lethargy
- tremors
- delirium
- frequent seizures
- convulsions
- heat prostration
- coma
- respiratory failure
- death

== Short-term effects (6–8 weeks) ==
=== Skin ===
The skin is susceptible to beta-emitting radioactive fallout. The principal site of damage is the germinal layer, and often the initial response is erythema (reddening) due to blood vessels congestion and edema. Erythema lasting more than 10 days occurs in 50% of people exposed to 5-6 Gray.

Other effects with exposure include:

- 2–3 Gray—temporary hair loss
- 7 Gray—permanent epilation occurs
- 10 Gray—itching and flaking occurs
- 10–20 Gray—weeping blistering and ulceration will occur

=== Lungs ===
The lungs are the most radiosensitive organ, and radiation pneumonitis can occur leading to pulmonary insufficiency and death (100% after exposure to 50 Gray of radiation), in a few months.

Radiation pneumonitis is characterized by:

- Loss of epithelial cells
- Edema
- Inflammation
- Occlusions of airways, air sacs and blood vessels
- Fibrosis

=== Ovaries ===
A single dose of 1–2 Gray will cause temporary damage and suppress menstruation for periods up to 3 years; a dose of 4 Gray will cause permanent sterility.

=== Testicles ===
A dose of 0.1 Gray will cause low sperm counts for up to a year; 2.5 Gray will cause sterility for 2 to 3 years or more. 4 Gray will cause permanent sterility.

== Long-term effects ==
=== Cataract induction ===
The timespan for developing this symptom ranges from 6 months to 30 years to develop but the median time for developing them is 2–3 years.

- 2 Gray of gamma rays cause opacities in a few percent
- 6-7 Gray can seriously impair vision and cause cataracts

=== Cancer induction ===
Cancer induction is the most significant long-term risk of exposure to a nuclear bomb. Approximately 1 out of every 80 people exposed to 1 Gray will die from cancer, in addition to the normal rate of 20 out of 80. About 1 in 40 people will get cancer, in addition to the typical rates of 16-20 out of 40. Different types of cancer take different times for them to appear:

- 2 years for leukemia to appear
- 20 or more years for skin cancer or lung cancer

=== In utero effects on human development ===
A 1 Gy dose of radiation will cause between 0 and 20 extra cases of perinatal mortality, per 1,000 births and 0-20 cases per 1000 births of severe mental sub-normality. A 0.05 Gy dose will increase death due to cancer 10 fold, from the normal 0.5 per 1000 birth rate to a rate of 5 per 1,000. An antenatal dose of 1 Gy in the first trimester causes the lifetime risk of fatal cancer sometime in the child's life to increase from c. 25% in non-exposed humans to 100% in the first trimester after exposure.

=== Transgenerational genetic damage ===
Exposure to even relatively low doses of radiation generates genetic damage in the progeny of irradiated rodents. This damage can accumulate over several generations. No statistically demonstrable increase of congenital malformations was found among the later conceived children born to survivors of the Nuclear weapons at Hiroshima and Nagasaki. The surviving women of Hiroshima and Nagasaki, that could conceive, who were exposed to substantial amounts of radiation, went on and had children with no higher incidence of abnormalities than the Japanese average.

=== Infectious diseases resulting from nuclear attack ===
It was assumed in the 1983 book Medical Consequences of Radiation Following a Global Nuclear War that, although not caused by radiation, one of the long-term effects of a nuclear war would be a massive increase in infectious diseases caused by fecal matter contaminated water from untreated sewage, crowded living conditions, poor standard of living, and lack of vaccines in the aftermath of a nuclear war, with the following list of diseases being cited:

- Dysentery
- Typhoid
- Infectious hepatitis
- Salmonellosis
- Cholera
- Meningococcal meningitis
- Tuberculosis
- Diphtheria
- Whooping cough
- Polio
- Pneumonia

There would be billions of disease carrying vectors, in the form of city residents, lying deceased in cities caused by the direct nuclear weapons effects alone, with the surviving few billion people spread out in rural communities living agrarian lifestyles, with the survivors therefore posing a way of living far less prone to creating the crowded slum living conditions required for infectious diseases to spread. Moreover, as reported in a paper published in the journal Public Health Reports, it is also one of a number of prevalent myths that infectious diseases always occur after a disaster in cities.

Epidemics seldom occur after a disaster, and dead bodies do not lead to catastrophic outbreaks of infectious diseases. Intuitively, epidemic diseases, illnesses, and injuries might be expected following major disasters. However, as noted by de Goyet, epidemics seldom occur after disasters, and unless deaths are caused by one of a small number of infectious diseases such as smallpox, typhus, or plague, exposure to dead bodies does not cause disease ... Cholera and typhoid seldom pose a major health threat after disasters unless they are already endemic.

== See also ==
- Blast shelter
- Fallout shelter
- Textbook of Military Medicine
