= Hiroshima (painting) =

Painting by Yves Klein

- Artist: Yves Klein
- Year: 1961
- Medium: Pure pigment and synthetic resin on paper mounted on panel
- Dimensions: 139.5 cm × 280.5 cm (54.9 in × 110.4 in)
- Location: Menil Collection, Houston

Hiroshima, also known as ANT 79, is a painting by the French painter Yves Klein, created in 1961. Through the use of both anthropometry and monochromy, the work pays tribute to the victims of Hiroshima, affected by the atomic bomb dropped on August 6, 1945, by the United States. The painting refers to the imprints of the burned bodies on the walls of the city. It is held in the Menil Collection, in Houston.

== History ==
Hiroshima is one of Klein's famous anthropometries, where he wanted to pay tribute to the victims of this tragic event. His anthropometries feature naked women covered in his own International Klein Blue and whose bodily imprints affixed to a canvas would create the final works. There were two types of anthropometries, the positive (dynamic) anthropometry, in which the model would act as a paintbrush, crawling across the canvas, and the negative (static), like Hiroshima, a method which consisted of spraying paint around a model used as a stencil.

== Analysis ==
The composition of the painting is sober. The imprints of the bodies of the women painted in blue reveal ghostly silhouettes in movement. The work seeks to depicts human beings in general and not women in particular and the features of the characters are indistinguishable. Klein wanted, through negative anthropometry, to make reference to the shadows of human bodies burned by the bomb on the walls of the city of Hiroshima. This work pays tribute to the victims of the Little Boy bomb. The IKB used by Yves Klein marks the imprint of the bodies as nuclear heat was able to do to the victims of the bomb.

Klein said on this work: "...Hiroshima, the shadows of Hiroshima; in the desert of the atomic catastrophe, they were an undoubtedly terrible testimony but nonetheless a testimony of hope for the survival and permanence, even immaterial, of the flesh."
