= Friction (disambiguation) =

Friction is the force that opposes the relative motion or tendency of such motion of two surfaces in contact.

Friction may also refer to:

== Music ==
- Friction (Coney Hatch album), 1983 album by Coney Hatch
- Friction (Stavesacre album), 1996 album by Stavesacre
- Friction (Phideaux Xavier album), 1993 album by Phideaux Xavier
- Friction (band), a Japanese rock band formed in 1978
- Friction (music producer), a drum and bass artist from the UK
- Friction (Ghanaian musician), an Afrobeat and reggae artist from Ghana
- DJ Friction, member of hip-hop group Freundeskreis
- "Friction," a song by Television from their 1977 album Marquee Moon
- "Friction," a song by Morcheeba from their 1998 album Big Calm
- “Friction,” a song by B'z from their 2007 album Action
- "Friction," a song by Imagine Dragons from their 2015 album Smoke + Mirrors

== Other uses ==
- Friction: An Ethnography of Global Connection, a 2004 book by anthropologist Anna Tsing
- Friction, a show on BBC Asian Network hosted by Bobby Friction
- Friction, a type of market incompleteness
- Friction, a concept introduced by Carl von Clausewitz to name how simple things become difficult in war because of misfortunes and mistakes
- Friction, the codename of Charlotte Beck, a character in the Marvel Comics publication DP 7

== See also ==
- DJ Friction (disambiguation)
- Phriction
