= Infernal (Phideaux album) =

Studio album by Phideaux Xavier
- Released: August 31, 2018
- Genre: Progressive rock

Phideaux Xavier chronology
Snowtorch (2011)	Infernal (2018)

Infernal is the ninth studio album by American musician Phideaux Xavier, said to be the third and final part of his projected "Trilogy" of albums dealing with "Big Brother" authoritarianism and ecological crisis, after part one, The Great Leap, and part two, Doomsday Afternoon.

Five days before its intended release, it was announced that the album's release had been pushed back until September 9. The album was digitally released 9 days early on August 31.

== Track listing ==
No.	Title	Length
1.	"Cast Out and Cold"
2.	"The Error Lives On"
3.	"Crumble"
4.	"Inquisitor"
5.	"We Only Have Eyes for You"
6.	"Sourdome"
7.	"The Walker"
8.	"Wake the Sleeper"
9.	"C99"
10.	"Tumbleweed"
11.	"The Order of Protection (One)"
12.	"Metro Deathfire"
13.	"Transit"
14.	"In Dissonance We Play"
15.	"The Sleepers Wake"
16.	"The Order of Protection (Two)"
17.	"From Hydrogen to Love"
18.	"Eternal"
19.	"Endgame - An End"
