= Historic Wendover Airfield =

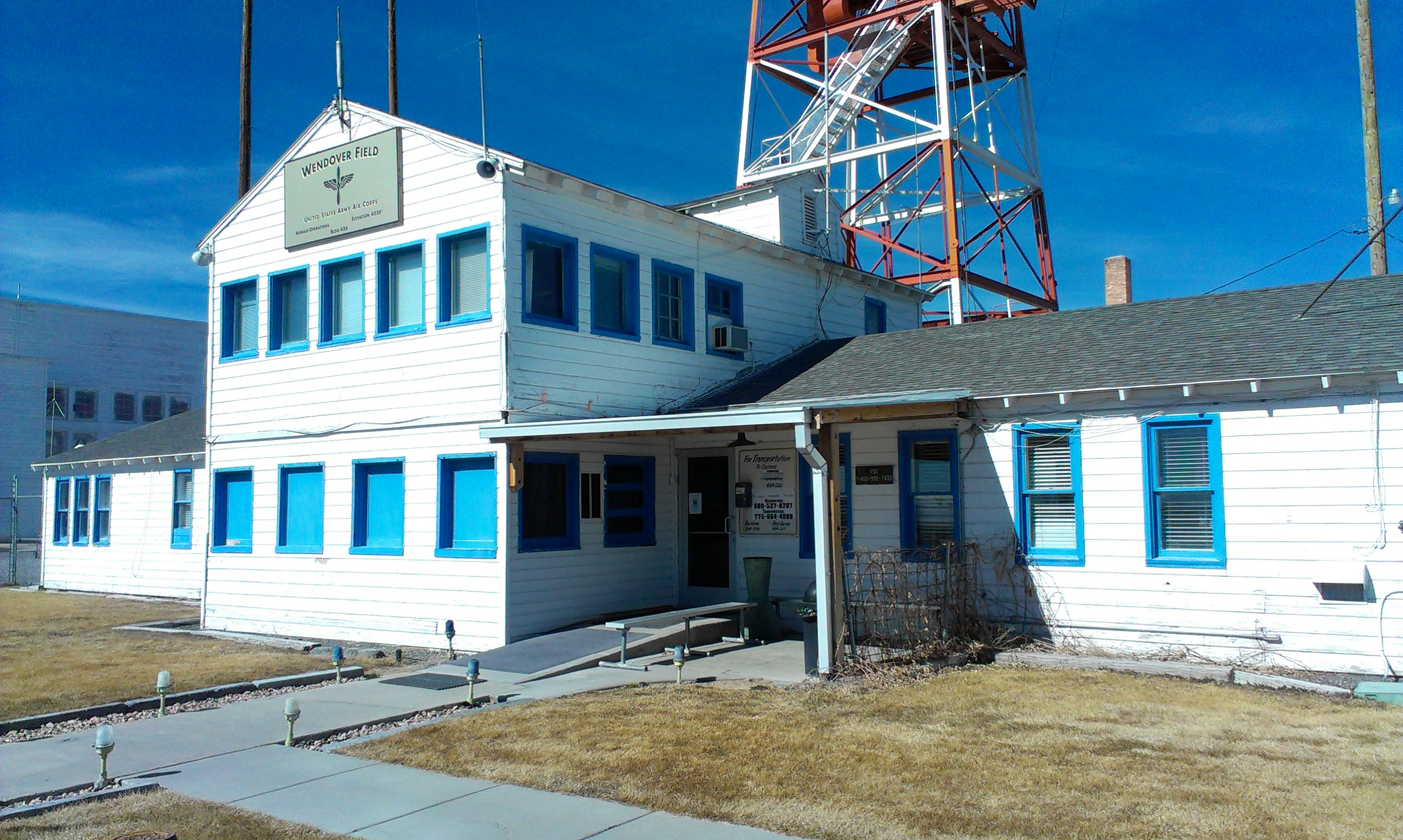
- The former operations building

- Location within Utah
- Established: 2001
- Location: Wendover, Utah
- Coordinates: 40.7280°N 114.0377°W
- Type: Aviation museum
- Founder: Jim Petersen
- Curator: Landon Wilkey
- Website: www.wendoverairfield.org

The Historic Wendover Airfield is an aviation museum located at Wendover Airport in Wendover, Utah focused on the history of Wendover Air Force Base.

== History ==
=== Background ===
Due to the remote location and favorable climate, many of the buildings at the base remained in unaltered, although somewhat deteriorated, condition. For this reason, the base was listed on the National Register of Historic Places in 1975.

=== Establishment ===
The Historic Wendover Airfield Foundation was established in 2001 after Jim Petersen visited the airport as part of a tour group. The following year he became airport manager. The project began with the renovation of, and opening a museum in, the former operations building in March of that year.

The Enola Gay Hangar was placed on the 2009 list of America's Most Endangered Places and as a result the foundation received a number of grants, including one from the Save America's Treasures program, that allowed the structure to be restored. This was followed by the rededication of the control tower in 2012 and the completion of work on the service club in 2015.

The museum encountered some controversy when, in 2017, it agreed to display one of the one thousand origami cranes folded by atomic bomb victim Sadako Sasaki.

The museum acquired a Douglas C-54 Skymaster in September 2020. Two months later, one of the barracks was destroyed by fire after a stove was left unattended. Then, in 2021, the museum unveiled a four phased plan, called "Save Where They Walked", for the restoration of many of the remaining buildings on the airport.

The museum placed a replica of the Fat Man atomic bomb on display in June 2023.

== Facilities ==
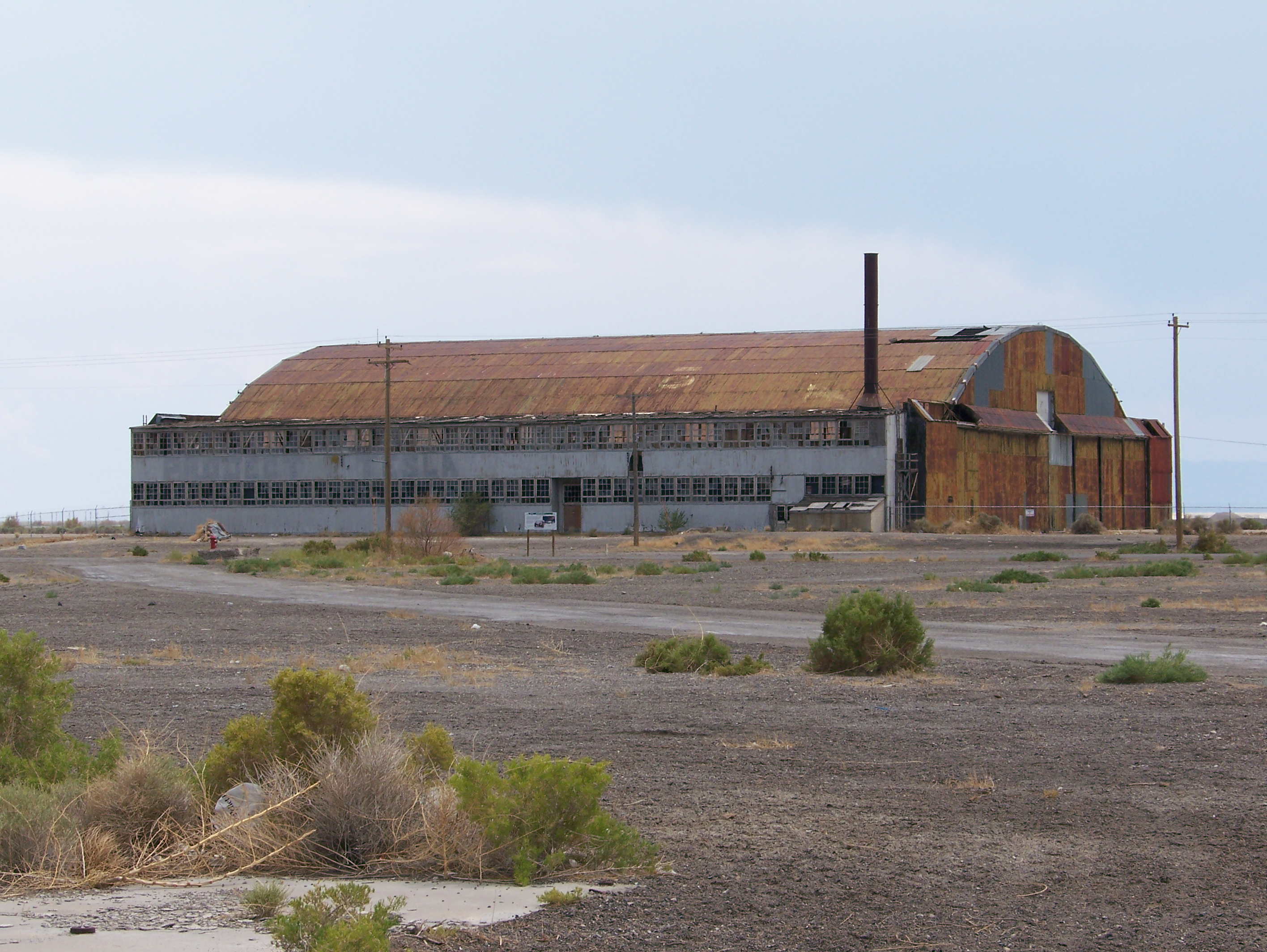
Enola Gay hangar before restoration in January 2006

- 2410 barracks – restoration completed
- Administration building – restoration ongoing
- B-29 hangar – restoration ongoing
- Control tower – restoration completed
- Dining hall – restoration ongoing
- Norden bombsight storage – restoration completed, 2013
- Nurse's quarters – restoration ongoing
- Service club – restoration completed
- Shower and latrine building – restoration upcoming

== Exhibits ==
Exhibits at the museum include a replica of the Little Boy atomic bomb (Note: The replica was constructed by John Coster-Mullen.), an origami crane made by Sadako Sasaki, World War II homefront materials, World War II uniforms, and prototype atomic bomb components. The museum recently acquired an aluminum model of the Consolidated B-24H Liberator by Guillermo Rojas Bazan.

== Collection ==
=== Aircraft ===
- Douglas C-54 Skymaster
- Fairchild C-123K Provider
- North American F-86L Sabre

=== Ground vehicles ===
- 1949 Plymouth military police car
- American LaFrance 700
- Ford GPW
- Ford GTB
- Ford/American LaFrance fire engine
- GMC CCKW 2½-ton 6×6 truck

== Events ==
The museum holds an annual airshow.

== See also ==
- List of aviation museums
- List of HABS documentation of Wendover Air Force Base
