= Morris R. Jeppson =

United States Army Air Forces officer

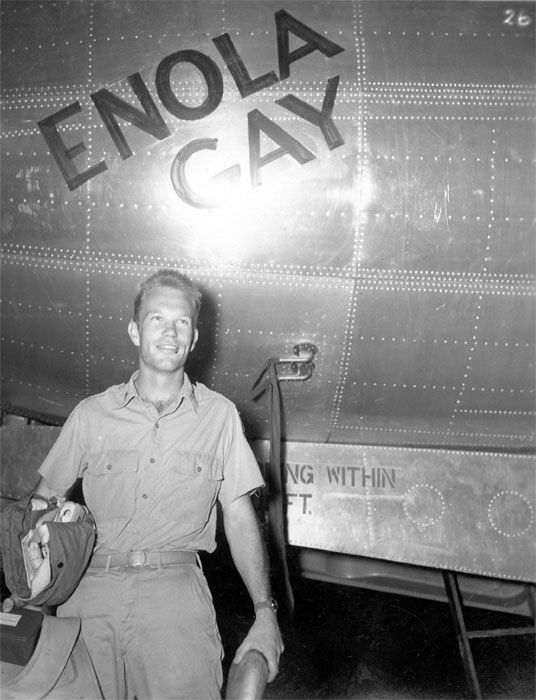
- Born: June 23, 1922; Logan, Utah, U.S.
- Died: March 30, 2010 (aged 87); Las Vegas, Nevada, U.S.
- Military career
- Allegiance: United States
- Branch: United States Army Air Forces
- Service years: 1942–1946
- Rank: Second Lieutenant
- Conflicts: World War II
- Awards: Silver Star; Air Medal

Morris Richard Jeppson (June 23, 1922 – March 30, 2010) was a second lieutenant in the United States Army Air Forces during World War II. He served as assistant weaponeer on the Enola Gay, which dropped the first atomic bomb on the city of Hiroshima, Japan on August 6, 1945.

== Early life ==
Jeppson was born in Logan, Utah, and studied physics at the University of Nevada, Reno. After enlisting in the United States Army Air Corps in 1942 at the age of 19 and basic training in Florida, he received electrical engineering training at Yale University, Harvard University and MIT. He then worked on bomb firing mechanisms with Los Alamos scientists at Wendover Air Force Base, Utah.

== The Hiroshima mission ==
Second Lieutenant Jeppson, along with then Captain William "Deak" Parsons of the U.S. Navy were responsible for arming the atomic bomb "Little Boy" on the Boeing B-29 Superfortress bomber during the flight from Tinian to Japan. The bomb was protected from premature in-flight detonation by inserting three safety plugs into the electrical connection from its internal battery to the firing mechanism. This was designed to prevent a firing voltage from reaching the mechanism. Each plug was approximately 3 inches (7.6 cm) in length, with a green cap for the safety plug and a red cap for the arming plug. Jeppson's role was to climb into the bomb bay and remove the three green safety plugs from the bomb and to replace them with the three red plugs just before the aircraft climbed to high altitude close the target area. With the actions of switching these plugs, Jeppson became the last person to handle the “Little Boy” bomb. He clarified this in the BBC documentary Hiroshima.

== Later life and career ==
In September 1945, Jeppson was awarded the Silver Star in recognition of his service to his country. During the 1950s he worked as a scientist at Lawrence Livermore National Laboratory in California developing hydrogen thermonuclear weapons. Later in his career, he helped develop several key technological breakthroughs including microwave technology as well as stabilizers used on helicopters. After retiring from his work as a physicist, Jeppson lived in Las Vegas with his second wife Mollie.

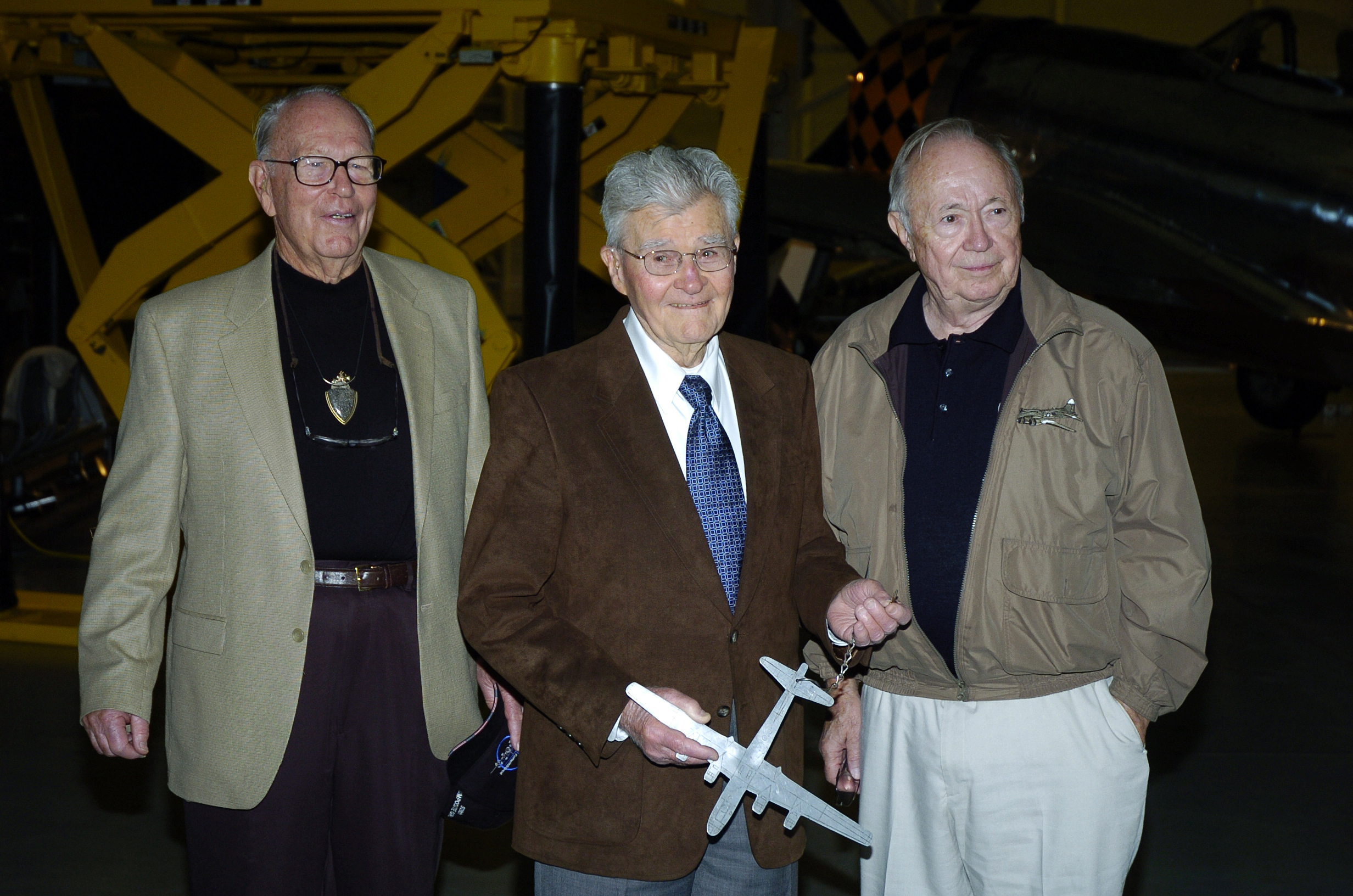
Left to right: Morris Jeppson, Colonel Paul Tibbets, Theodore Van Kirk at the National Air and Space Museum's Steven F Udvar-Hazy Center on October 23, 2004

For many years, Jeppson refused to speak publicly about the Hiroshima mission for fear of reprisal against himself and his family. Starting in 1985, he became more willing to speak about it. On the 40th anniversary of the dropping of the bomb, Jeppson granted an interview and recounted his part in the mission.

In June 2002, a controversy over the sale of a set of safety plugs Jeppson had kept since the mission occurred. After the mission Jeppson had kept one of each in his possession. The plugs were offered for sale in an auction, however the U.S. government tried to halt the sale, claiming they were classified secret material. U.S. District Court Judge Susan Illston rejected the claim by the government clearing the way for the sale. The plugs were eventually sold to retired physicist Clay Perkins for $167,000.

A reunion for the 60th anniversary in 2005 which was supposed to take place on the island of Guam had been in the planning stages, but never materialized. Time Magazine published an in-depth issue commemorating the 60th anniversary of the dropping of the bombs on Japan. Jeppson and other crew members gave accounts of their experiences. Jeppson also gave an account of his role in the mission in the BBC drama documentary Hiroshima in 2005 and his removal of the safety plugs was portrayed by an actor.

== Death ==
Jeppson died on March 30, 2010, in Las Vegas. He is survived by his wife, brother, three children, five grandchildren and three great grandchildren. With Jeppson's death, Theodore Van Kirk became the last surviving Enola Gay crew member (Van Kirk died on July 28, 2014).

== Military decorations ==
His decorations include:

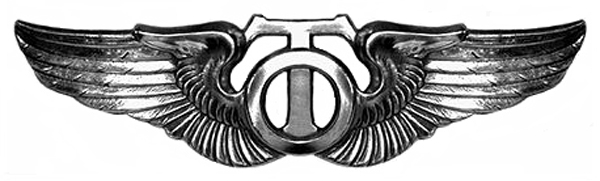

USAAF Technical Observer Badge
Silver Star	Air Medal	Air Force Outstanding Unit Award with "V" device
American Campaign Medal	Asiatic-Pacific Campaign Medal with two bronze campaign stars	World War II Victory Medal

=== Silver Star citation ===
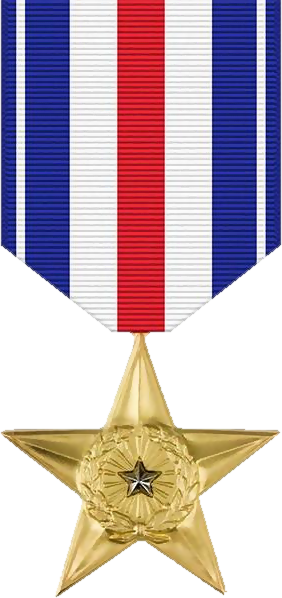

Jeppson, Morris R.
Second Lieutenant, U.S Army Air Forces
393d Bombardment Squadron, 509th Composite Group, 20th Air Force
Date of Action: August 6, 1945
Headquarters, 20th Air Force, General Orders No. 69 (September 22, 1945)
Citation:

The President of the United States of America, authorized by Act of Congress July 9, 1918, takes pleasure in presenting the Silver Star to Second Lieutenant (Air Corps) Morris R. Jeppson, United States Army Air Forces, for gallantry in action while engaged in aerial flight against the Japanese Empire on 6 August 1945. Second Lieutenant Jeppson was the Electronics Officer for a combat crew of the B-29 aircraft of the 393d Bombardment Squadron, 509th Composite Group, Twentieth Air Force, which flew from a base in the Marianas Islands to drop on the city of Hiroshima, Japan, the first atomic bomb to be used in warfare. Flying 1500 miles over open water to the coast of Japan, they manned their assigned positions and crossed the island of Shikoku and the Inland Sea. They constantly faced the danger of being hit by anti-aircraft fire, enemy fighters, or suffering mechanical or other failures which would intensify the risks of carrying this powerful missile. Throughout the mission the element of hazard from the unknown prevailed, for this was the first time that this bomb, much more destructive than any other in existence, had been dropped from an airplane. The effect it would have on the airplane and these crew members was only to be estimated. Shortly after 09:00 they brought the plane in over the city, and at 09:15 the bomb release was pressed. The bomb cleared, and fell toward the planned objective. They then headed from the area and, despite a minor effect from the detonation, returned safely to their home base. By their courage and skillful performance of duty achieved in outstanding fashion despite the dangers involved in accomplishment of this historic mission, these individuals distinguished themselves by extraordinary achievement and reflect great credit on themselves and the Army Air Forces.
