= Phideaux Xavier =

American musician

- Also known as: Phideaux
- Born: January 14, 1963 (age 63); Hastings-on-Hudson, New York, U.S.
- Genre: Progressive rock
- Occupations: Television Director, Musician, Singer, Guitarist, Composer
- Instruments: Guitar, Piano, Vocals
- Years active: 1990-Present
- Label: Blood Fish Media
- Website: Blood Fish.com

Phideaux Xavier (born Scott Riggs; January 14, 1963) is an American television director, and composer of modern technological music that he describes as "psychedelic progressive gothic rock", who grew up near New York City but now lives in Los Angeles.

== Early life ==
Phideaux was born Scott Riggs on January 14, 1963 in Hastings-on-Hudson, one of three children. He started composing music in high school.

== Career ==
=== Previous bands ===
Phideaux first played with Mark Sherkus (piano), Dean Deluke (drums), and Bucky Deluke (trumpet) in ESP. He was later part of a band called the Delukes from Southern California. Next, Xavier played with Molly Ruttan (drums), Linda Ruttan-Moldawsky (bass) and Amanda Ettlinger (flute) in a progressive rock band called Mirkwood, which later morphed into a punk/pop band called Sally Dick & Jane, after the departure of Amanda Ettlinger, and the addition of vocalist/keyboardist Valerie Gracius. They played at various legendary NYC clubs, including Max's Kansas City and CBGB, during the early to mid 1980s, but failed to record anything of substance and were marginal to the scene.

=== Friction ===
After Sally Dick & Jane ended, Phideaux worked on music alone as a one-man recording project. He attended school at New York University for film and television production. After graduating from college, Phideaux decided to return to the collaborative aspect of music and formed an acoustic-themed band called The SunMachine with childhood friend Ariel Farber (violin/vocals) and various other musicians. They played a mostly acoustic progressive rock style music with flutes, violin, keyboards, percussion, 12-string guitar, and electric bass. It was during this time in 1992 that the first "official" (though now deleted) album, Friction, was recorded.

Friction involved The SunMachine, but also included collaborations with other people, including the former members of Sally Dick & Jane. There were several tracks which were done by Phideaux himself, and many tracks included synthesizer and MIDI music. This album, despite lacking worldwide distribution, was met with a lukewarm response from audiences and it has since been deleted, remanded to status of "ambitious demo".

After a few aborted SunMachine recording sessions, the band ended in 1994 when Phideaux met former Live Skull drummer Rich Hutchins. They began to rehearse music together and both played in a band called Satyricon (not to be confused with the Norwegian black metal band of the same name). During that time, they started rehearsing the songs that became Ghost Story, and developed a working relationship; however, no suitable recordings of Ghost Story were made, and Phideaux left NYC for work in Los Angeles.

=== Fiendish ===
In 2002, Phideaux began to work with Gabriel Moffat, Molly Ruttan's husband, on a series of new demos. He got back together with Rich Hutchins and recorded the album Fiendish. In the producer chair was Mark Kramer, known to Phideaux for his work with Bongwater, Brainville (with Daevid Allen, Pip Pyle and Hugh Hopper) and the Danielson Family. Fiendish was "progressive space folk", according to Phideaux, and contained 11 mid-length songs. The longest track, "Soundblast", took its lyrics from a leaflet dropped over Japan shortly after the detonation of the Little Boy atomic bomb at Hiroshima. This album was released in 2003, despite the copyright of 2004 on the artwork.

=== Ghost Story ===
After completing Fiendish, Xavier was convinced that he was now prepared to record his songs from the aborted album Ghost Story. He and Hutchins quickly reconvened to redo that album with Gabriel Moffat producing and mixing. Ghost Story was released in 2004. The track "Beyond The Shadow of Doubt" features a keyboard solo from Mark Sherkus, who joined the project at that time. Sam Fenster, who had played bass in The SunMachine, played bass in the album.

=== Chupacabras ===
While recording Fiendish in 2002, they had begun work on a 21-minute suite called "Chupacabras". This song was not completed in time for inclusion on Fiendish, so instead formed the basis for the 2005 release Chupacabras. This album includes a song from Phideaux and Hutchins' previous band, Satyricon, called "Titan".

=== 313 ===
Phideaux decided to make an "album in a day". On March 13, 2004, Phideaux musicians converged in Los Angeles for an unrehearsed recording session. During that day, they composed and recorded 13 songs, but the sessions were shelved until after Chupacabras was released. In 2005, Phideaux and Gabriel Moffat polished up the recordings, and on March 13, 2006, released the album 313 (named for the date upon which it was recorded). The cover artwork for this album was by Margie Schnibbe, another childhood friend of Phideaux's.

=== The Great Leap and Doomsday Afternoon ===
In August 2005, while putting the finishing touches on 313, Phideaux and mates returned to the studio to record the first two parts of a projected "Trilogy" of albums telling of a near-future dystopia. Part one, The Great Leap, was released in September 2006, and part two, Doomsday Afternoon, was released in 2007. The former features shorter songs and is somewhat more of a return to the simpler song structures of Ghost Story, whereas the latter is more akin to Chupacabras in its breadth, resembling symphonic prog to a greater degree. Its overarching ecological theme of man's refusal to face up to global warming along with its recurring musical themes lend the album a symphonic prog style structure and scale. Phideaux Xavier and many fans alike consider Doomsday Afternoon to be his masterpiece. The album's regular musicians are supplemented by members of the Los Angeles Symphony Orchestra. In 2007, Phideaux's band played in the US and at the Festival Crescendo in St Palais-sur-Mer, France.

=== Number Seven ===
After almost a two-year wait, Phideaux released Number Seven. Although Number Seven is technically the follow-up to Doomsday Afternoon, it is not part three of the "Trilogy." It's a three-part concept album telling the story of a struggle between a dormouse and a crayfish.

Phideaux planned to release Seven and ½ later in 2010, which the band states is an appendix to Number Seven. Phideaux has announced that he would like to release Seven and ½, remaster Doomsday Afternoon and create a live performance DVD before working on Infernal, the finale of his trilogy.

== Current live band ==
The performers who work with Phideaux Xavier are people that he grew up with. They have played with him in many albums although the first one in which they, and only they, played all the instruments was Number Seven. It is formed by:

- Ariel Farber: Vocals, Violin
- Valerie Gracius: Vocals, Piano
- Rich Hutchins: Drums
- Mathew Kennedy: Bass guitar
- Gabriel Moffat: Electric guitar
- Molly Ruttan: Vocals, Percussion
- Linda Ruttan-Moldawsky: Vocals
- Mark Sherkus: Keyboards
- Johnny Unicorn: Vocals, Keyboards
- Phideaux Xavier: Vocals, Piano, Various Guitars

== Discography ==
- Friction (1993) (Not considered as such by them.)
- Fiendish (2003)
- Ghost Story (2004)
- Chupacabras (2005)
- 313 (2006)
- The Great Leap (2006)
- Doomsday Afternoon (2007)
- Number Seven (2009)
- Snowtorch (2011)
- Infernal (2018)
- Lysogenic Burnt Offerings (2020)
- Automoto Animus (2026)

=== Guest appearances ===
- 01011001 by Ayreon (2008) - guest vocals
- Margaret's Children by Guy Manning (2011) - guest announcer on " A night at the Savoy"
- 01011001 – Live Beneath the Waves (2024) - guest vocals

== Directing credits ==
- Sunset Beach (1999)
- Passions (2002–2008)
- The Young and the Restless (July 2007 – May 2008)
- General Hospital (July 2007 – June 2024)
- Beyond the Gates (since February 2025)

== Daytime Emmys ==
=== Won ===
- 2015 Outstanding Drama Series Directing Team for: "General Hospital"
- 2012 Outstanding Drama Series Directing Team for: "General Hospital"
- 2010 Outstanding Drama Series Directing Team for: "General Hospital"

=== Nominated ===
- 2015 Outstanding Drama Series Directing Team for: "General Hospital"
- 2011 Outstanding Drama Series Directing Team for: "General Hospital"
- 2004 Outstanding Drama Series Directing Team for: "Passions"
- 2003 Outstanding Drama Series Directing Team for: "Passions"
- 2002 Outstanding Special Class Directing for: "Spyder Games"

== Other sources ==
- Prog-Resiste Magazine interview issue 44
- Interview The Grain Division.com April 2004
- Idioglossia.de March 2006
