= Snowtorch =

Studio album by Phideaux Xavier
- Released: March 21, 2011
- Genre: Progressive rock
- Length: 44:44
- Label: Bloodfish Media
- Producer: Gabriel Moffat

Phideaux Xavier chronology
Number Seven (2009)	Snowtorch (2011)	Infernal (2018)

Snowtorch is the eighth studio album by American musician Phideaux Xavier. It was released March 21, 2011.

== Track listing ==
All songs written by Phideaux Xavier, except "Celestine" by Mark Sherkus.

No.	Title	Length
1.	"Snowtorch (Part One)": "Star of Light"; "Retrograde"; "Fox on the Rocks"; "Celestine"	19:42
2.	"Helix"	5:54
3.	"Snowtorch (Part Two)": "Blowtorch Snowjob"; "Fox Rock 2"; "Coronal Mass Ejection"	16:28
4.	"."	2:40

== Personnel ==
- Phideaux Xavier - Acoustic Guitar, Piano, Vocals
- Ariel Farber - Vocals, Violin
- Valerie Gracious - Vocals
- Rich Hutchins - Drums
- Mathew Kennedy - Bass Guitar
- Gabriel Moffat - Electric Guitar
- Molly Ruttan - Vocals, Metal Percussion
- Linda Ruttan - Moldawsky - Vocals
- Mark Sherkus - Keyboards, Piano
- Jonny Unicorn - Keyboards, Saxophone, Vocals
- Stefanie Fife - Cello
- Chris Bleth - Flute, Soprano Saxophone
