= The Great Leap (Phideaux album) =

Studio album by Phideaux Xavier
- Released: September 18, 2006
- Recorded: Firehouse Recording Studios (Pasadena, CA), Phideaux's Lair, & Treehouse Mixing
- Genre: Progressive rock
- Length: 54:15
- Label: Bloodfish Music
- Producer: Gabriel Moffat

Phideaux Xavier chronology
313 (2006)	The Great Leap (2006)	Doomsday Afternoon (2007)

The Great Leap is the fifth album by composer Phideaux Xavier. It was released in 2006.

In August 2005, while putting the finishing touches on 313, Xavier returned to the studio to record the first two parts of a projected "Trilogy" of albums dealing with "Big Brother" authoritarianism and ecological crisis. The Great Leap is part one of that trilogy, while part two, Doomsday Afternoon, released a year later. The album features shorter songs and is a return to the simpler song structures of Ghost Story.

== Track listing ==
No.	Title	Length
1.	"Wake Up"	4:03
2.	"You and Me Against a World of Pain"	5:35
3.	"The Waiting"	3:33
4.	"Abducted"	6:10
5.	"Rainboy"	6:15
6.	"I Was Thinking"	4:24
7.	"Long and Lonely Way"	4:18
8.	"They Hunt You Down"	3:54
9.	"Tannis Root"	4:52
10.	"One Star"	5:14
11.	"Last"	5:50
Total length:		54:08
