= 313 (album) =

Studio album by Phideaux Xavier
- Released: March 13, 2006
- Recorded: Firehouse Studios (Pasadena, California)
- Genre: Progressive rock
- Length: 48:19
- Label: Bloodfish Music
- Producer: Gabriel Moffat

Phideaux Xavier chronology
Chupacabras (2005)	313 (2006)	The Great Leap (2006)

313 is the fourth album released by composer Phideaux Xavier.

Xavier and his band of musicians had done three well rehearsed, well conceived albums, and decided to make an "album in a day".

On March 13, 2004, all of Phideaux Xavier's musicians met in Los Angeles for an unrehearsed recording session. During that day, they composed and recorded 13 songs; however, the final results were deemed to be nothing more than embryonic, and those sessions were shelved until after the album Chupacabras was released. In 2005, Xavier and Gabriel Moffat polished up the recordings, and on March 13, 2006, released the album.

The cover artwork for this album was by Margie Schnibbe, another childhood friend of Phideaux Xavier's.

The album was rated a three out of five by Leonard's Lair.

== Track listing ==
No.	Title	Length
1.	"Railyard"	3:32
2.	"Have You Hugged Your Robot?"	3:08
3.	"A Storm of Cats"	2:34
4.	"Never Gonna Go"	3:43
5.	"Pyramid"	4:13
6.	"There's Only One of You"	2:37
7.	"Orangutan"	2:57
8.	"(A)Sick of Me /(B) Coda 99"	5:41
9.	"In Search of Bitter Ore"	4:03
10.	"(A)Cats 2 / (B) Body to Space"	5:33
11.	"Watching Machine"	2:27
12.	"Run Singing Tiger"	3:37
13.	"Benediction"	4:05

== Personnel ==
- Ariel Farber: vocals
- Linda Ruttan: vocals
- Valerie Gracious: vocals
- Gabriel Moffat: guitar, bass guitar (1), FX, producer
- Mark Sherkus: keyboards, synthesizer (1), grand piano (2, 4), Mellotron sample (1), electric guitar (3), electric sitar (3), bass synth (1), harpsichord sample(3), korg karma synth (2), Chamberlin sample (4), micro moog (5, 11), organ (6, 8 (A & B), 13), electric piano (12)
- Phideaux Xavier: vocals (tracks 1–10), grand piano (1, 3, 5, 6, 10 (A)), piano (13), acoustic guitar (1, 6), electric guitar (2, 4, 7, 11, 12), bass guitar (2, 3, 4, 5–8, 12), electric sitar (8), vocoder (2, 8 (B)), Ensoniq synthesizer (2, 8 (A & B), 11), E-bow chorus (7, 8 (B)), solo E-bow guitar (12), tooth brush (11)
- Julie Hair: bass, voice, percussion
- Richard Hutchins: drums (tracks 1–6, 8(A & B), 9, 12), mallets & cymbals (10, 11), cymbals (13)
- Molly Ruttan-Moffat: drums, vocals
