= Number Seven (Phideaux Xavier album) =

Studio album by Phideaux Xavier
- Released: May 29, 2009
- Genre: Progressive rock
- Length: 62:39
- Label: Bloodfish Media
- Producer: Gabriel Moffat

Phideaux Xavier chronology
Doomsday Afternoon (2007)	Number Seven (2009)	Snowtorch (2011)

Number Seven is the seventh studio album by American musician Phideaux Xavier. It is a concept album based on its main character; a dormouse. Inside, it features 20 pages of artwork featuring the dormouse and other characters.

The album's first and last song are "Dormouse – A Theme" and "Dormouse – An End" (reminiscent of King Crimson's In the Wake of Poseidon). It is divided into three acts.

== Musical styles ==
The album is played by the live band, with no outside musicians or orchestra. Its musical style is closer to the albums Chupacabras and Doomsday Afternoon. It is a blend of progressive rock and psychedelic rock with chamber jazz and classical music.

== Remastered edition ==
A remastered version of the album was released in April 2010. Phideaux later said about the original release of Number Seven: "[...], we made a mistake with the first issue of Number Seven by breaking up the songs into smaller sub-bits for people to have easy access to. People couldn't really find the 'songs' of Number Seven." The remastered version of the album fused many of the original version's short tracks into longer tracks.

== Track listing ==
One: Dormouse Ensnared
No.	Title	Length
1.	"Dormouse: A Theme"	1:08
2.	"Waiting for the Axe to Fall"	6:13
3.	"Hive Mind"	4:00
4.	"The Claws of a Crayfish"	5:41
5.	"My Sleeping Slave"	3:26

Two: Dormouse Escapes
No.	Title	Length
1.	"Darkness at Noon"	1:50
2.	"Prequiem"	1:53
3.	"Gift of the Flame"	6:07
4.	"Interview With a Dormouse"	1:17
5.	"Thermonuclear Cheese"	1:54
6.	"The Search for Terrestrial Life"	5:32
7.	"A Fistful of Fortitude"	2:41

Three: Dormouse Enlightened
No.	Title	Length
1.	"Love Theme From 'Number Seven'"	7:06
2.	"Storia Senti"	6:42
3.	"Infinite Supply"	4:57
4.	"Dormouse: An End"	2:16

=== Remastered edition ===
One: Dormouse Ensnared
No.	Title	Length
1.	"Dormouse: A Theme"	1:08
2.	"Waiting for the Axe to Fall": "Waiting for the Axe to Fall"; "Hive Mind"; "The Claws of a Crayfish"; "My Sleeping Slave"	19:22

Two: Dormouse Escapes
No.	Title	Length
1.	"Darkness at Noon": "Darkness at Noon"; "Prequiem"	3:44
2.	"Gift of the Flame"	6:58
3.	"Interview With a Dormouse"	0:28
4.	"Thermonuclear Cheese"	1:55
5.	"The Search for Terrestrial Life": "The Search for Terrestrial Life"; "A Fistful of Fortitude"	8:14

Three: Dormouse Enlightened
No.	Title	Length
1.	"Love Theme From 'Number Seven'": "Love Theme From 'Number Seven'"; "Storia Senti"	13:50
2.	"Infinite Supply"	4:59
3.	"Dormouse: An End"	2:17
Total length:		62:55

== Personnel ==
- Phideaux Xavier – Acoustic guitar, electric twelve-string guitar, piano & vocals
- Ariel Farber – Violin & vocals
- Rich Hutchins – Drums & chant
- Mathew Kennedy – Electric bass guitar & chant
- Gabriel Moffat – Electric guitar & lap steel guitar
- Molly Ruttan – Vocals & percussion
- Linda Ruttan-Moldawsky – Vocals
- Mark Sherkus – Keyboards & electric guitar
- Jonny Unicorn – Keyboards, saxophone, vocals & chant
- Mixed by Gabriel Moffat
- Artwork by Linda Ruttan-Moldawsky
- Graphic Production by Molly Ruttan
