= John Coster-Mullen =

American nuclear archaeologist (1946–2021)

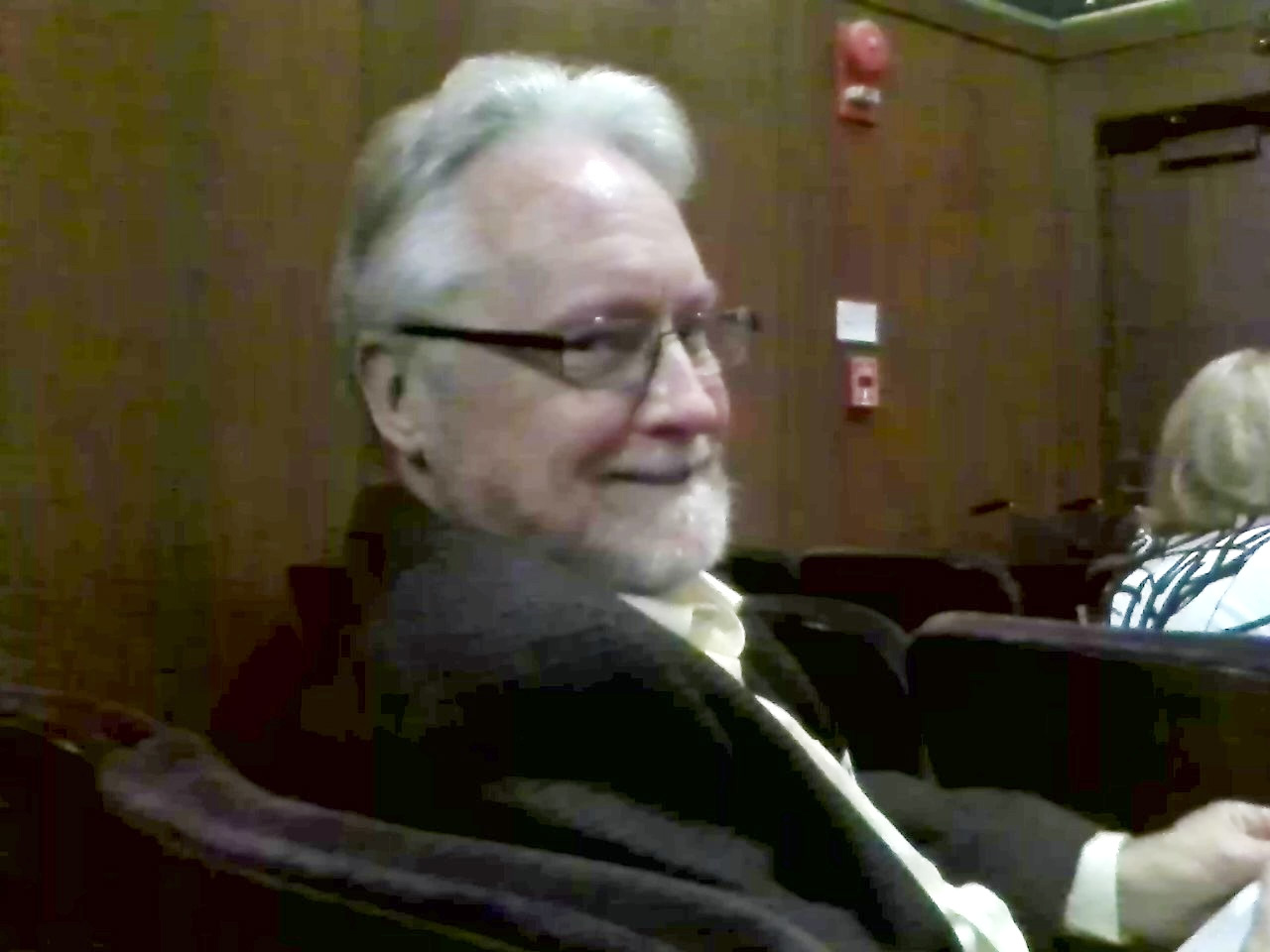
- Coster-Mullen at a conference hosted by the Atomic Heritage Foundation in Washington, DC (2015)
- Born: 21 December 1946
- Died: 24 April 2021 (aged 74)
- Occupations: Truck driver; historian; photographer
- Notable work: Atom Bombs: The Top Secret, Inside Story of Little Boy and Fat Man

John Coster-Mullen (21 December 1946 – 24 April 2021) was an American industrial photographer, truck driver and nuclear archaeologist who played an important role in creating a public record of the design of the first atomic bombs. He is known for his critically acclaimed self-published book Atom Bombs: The Top Secret, Inside Story of Little Boy and Fat Man.

== Biography ==
John Coster-Mullen was born on 21 December 1946. He became interested in nuclear weapons when he was in the seventh grade and the first pictures of the Little Boy and Fat Man bombs were released. "It was", he later said, "the most forbidden of topics, because it was the biggest secret in the whole world, the one you could never know."

Coster-Mullen entered the University of Wisconsin, but he struggled with mathematics. He dropped out in his junior year and instead became an industrial photographer. Over the next forty years, he worked at a variety of jobs: at a camera store in Milwaukee; on inventory control at Beloit Corporation, a manufacturer of paper products; and photographing industrial equipment for Trane, an air conditioning company, Mercury Marine, a manufacturer of boat motors, and Pohlman Studios in Milwaukee. He also had his own photography business. He eventually became a truck driver.

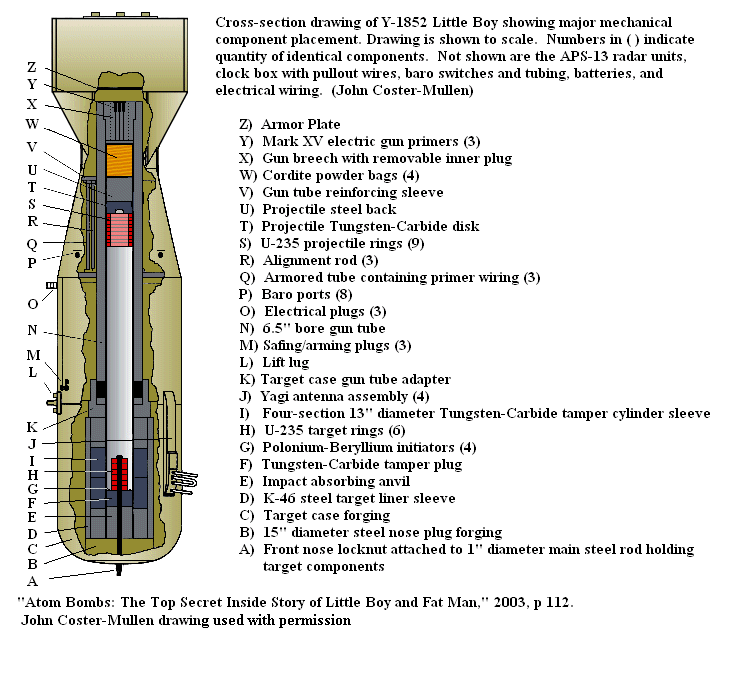
Coster-Mullen's diagram of Little Boy

In 1993, with the 50th anniversary of the atomic bombing of Hiroshima and Nagasaki approaching, Coster-Mullen decided that he could earn some money creating models of the Little Boy and Fat Man bombs and selling them online or through hobby shops. Some companies were already making them, but Coster-Mullen noticed that their models contained small errors, and he believed that he could do a better job. He began collecting all the material he could about their design.

With permission, he visited the National Museum of the United States Air Force at Wright-Patterson Air Force Base in Ohio, where bombs were on display, along with the Boeing B-29 Bockscar, which had dropped a Fat Man bomb on Nagasaki. While there he found that the 509th Composite Group, the unit that carried out the bombing raids, was holding a reunion in Chicago. There he met various former members of the 509th Composite Group, including Charles Sweeney and Charles Donald Albury, the pilot and co-pilot who flew Bockscar on the Nagasaki mission.

Thereafter, Coster-Mullen regularly attended reunions of the 509th Composite Group. The fiftieth reunion in 1995 was held in Albuquerque and Los Alamos, New Mexico, and they decided to invite the Project Alberta personnel, many of whom had worked at the wartime Los Alamos Laboratory. Most were happy to grant him interviews. He never sold a model, but the brochure that he intended to include with the models gradually grew into a 431-page book, Atom Bombs: The Top Secret, Inside Story of Little Boy and Fat Man (2003), as he gradually pieced together an unusually detailed account of how the weapons were built, assembled, and deployed. "North Korea designed a nuke", quipped National Public Radio, "so did this truck driver." He was profiled by The New Yorker in 2008. In 2003, he helped American sculptor Jim Sanborn with his installation "Critical Assembly" at the Corcoran Gallery of Art, at which, according to Sanborn, Coster-Mullen's work started to get attention from the government. In 2004, he built, with his son Jason, a replica of Little Boy for the Historic Wendover Airfield Museum, the former training site of the 509th Composite Group in Utah.

His most sensational discovery was that the Little Boy bomb was actually a "girl": while most historians had described the bomb as working by firing a small, solid "projectile" of enriched uranium into a larger, hollow "target," Coster-Mullen established conclusively that the projectile was a hollow set of rings which contained the majority of the uranium, and that it was fired onto a narrow target "spike". He continued revising his book until his death. He was an advisor to the National Atomic Museum, the Children of the Manhattan Project Preservation Association and the British Broadcasting Corporation, which used his work for a documentary.

In his final years Coster-Mullen suffered from amyotrophic lateral sclerosis. He died on April 24, 2021. His papers are in the Harry S. Truman Presidential Library and Museum.
