= Friction (Phideaux Xavier album) =

Studio album by Phideaux
- Released: 1993
- Recorded: The Lair and Context Studios, NYC
- Genre: Art rock
- Length: 76:46
- Label: Bloodfish Music
- Producer: Phideaux Xavier

Phideaux chronology
Friction (1993)	Fiendish (2003)

Friction is the debut album by American composer Phideaux Xavier. It was released in 1993. It is not, however, considered as an official album by him.

== Tracks ==
1. "Arise" (01:33)
2. "Love of a Million Doves" (05:30)
3. "Secret" (04:16)
4. "The Odyssey" (04:36)
5. "Lights Camera Friction" (05:13)
6. "Ashes" (0:34)
7. "The Life" (03:55)
8. "Resurrection Pact" (03:43)
9. "Inspecting the Spoils" (04:00)
10. "Aquamarine" (04:05)
11. "Zarathustra 2000" (02:25)
12. "Living (On the Petals)" (04:22)
13. "All Seeing Eye" (03:58)
14. "Claw the Land" (05:31)
15. "Azrael" (02:18)
16. "Bridge" (0:55)
17. "If We Will" (03:51)
18. "Menace" (0:42)
19. "Letters to the Tiger" (02:53)
20. "Tell Me" (05:04)
21. "Wake Up Little Beauties" (04:50)
22. (unlisted) (02:19)

== Personnel ==
- Phideaux Xavier / guitar, bass, keyboards, vocals
- Patrick Arena / vocals
- Rob Costin / vocals
- Valerie Gracious / vocals
- Grant King / vocals
- Dan Martin / vocals
- Rick Robertson / vocals
- Will Guterman / keyboards, vocals
- David Lewis / keyboards
- R. Weis / samples
- Anne DeWann / flute, vocals
- David Doris / soprano sax
- Ariel Farber / violin, vocals
- Dawn Buckholz / cello
- Sam Fenster / bass, vocals
- Linda Ruttan / bass, vocals
- Molly Ruttan / drums
- Michael Newman / drums
- Christopher Ballant / spoken word
- Michael Zener Gottlieb / spoken word
- Ian Scott Horst / spoken word
- Cayte Jablow / spoken word
- Michael Kowalewsk / spoken word
