= Doomsday Afternoon =

Studio album by Phideaux Xavier
- Released: June 21, 2007
- Genre: Progressive rock
- Length: 66:59
- Label: Bloodfish Media
- Producer: Gabriel Moffat

Phideaux Xavier chronology
The Great Leap (2006)	Doomsday Afternoon (2007)	Number Seven (2009)

Doomsday Afternoon is the sixth studio album by American musician Phideaux Xavier, and the second part of his projected "Trilogy" of albums dealing with "Big Brother" authoritarianism and ecological crisis, after part one, The Great Leap. It features more elaborate progressive rock song structures, similar to Chupacabras and his next two albums. To date, this is his most well known and critically acclaimed album, and Phideaux Xavier considers it to be his "masterpiece".

== Track listing ==
=== Act One ===
1. "Micro Softdeathstar" - 11:17
2. "The Doctrine of Eternal Ice (Part One)" - 3:01
3. "Candybrain" - 4:06
4. "Crumble" - 2:55
5. "The Doctrine of Eternal Ice (Part Two)" - 8:08

=== Act Two ===
1. "Thank You for the Evil" - 9:18
2. "A Wasteland of Memories" - 2:22
3. "Crumble" - 2:55
4. "Formaldehyde" - 8:17
5. "Microdeath Softstar" - 14:40

== Personnel ==
- Rich Hutchins – drums
- Ariel Farber – vocals, handclaps
- Valerie Gracious – piano, vocals
- Mathew Kennedy – bass guitar
- Gabriel Moffat – lap steel guitar, solo & electric guitar, textures, treatments, transitions
- Linda Ruttan Moldawsky – vocals
- Molly Ruttan – vocals
- Mark Sherkus – hammond B3, minimoog, ARP string ensemble, korg KARMA, sampler
- Phideaux Xavier – piano, rhodes, moog voyager, 6 & 12 string guitar, vocals
