= Arming plug =

Aircraft device

An arming plug is a small plug that is fitted into flight hardware to enable functions that, for instrument or personnel safety, should not be activated before flight. In the case of a missile or bomb, the (lack of the) arming plug prevents explosion before flight; in the case of a spacecraft or scientific sounding rocket, it might prevent premature firing of a hydrazine thruster system (hydrazine is extremely toxic) or block cryogenic or photographic film systems from operating before launch.
