= Friction (Ghanaian musician) =

- Born: Musah Haruna; March 6, 1984 (age 41); Accra, Ghana
- Genres: Afrobeat; Reggae

Musah Haruna (born 6 March 1984 in Accra, Ghana) is a Ghanaian Afrobeat and Reggae musician, known by his stagename Friction. Friction is the founder and former leader of the legendary Ghanaian Hiplife Music Group VIP (now VVIP). This group has become one of Ghana's most well known Hiplife music groups, and subject of documentaries such as HomeGrown: Hiplife in Ghana and the book The Hiplife in Ghana: West African Indigenization of Hip-Hop. Friction released two albums with VIP, 'Ye De Aba' and 'Bibi Baa O', and Friction and his group became a nationwide phenomenon. In the year 2000 Friction featured in Ghana's national HIV Campaign song 'Stop AIDS, Love Life' among other Ghanaian music stars such as Reggie Rockstone and Black Prophet.

After a couple of years with VIP, Friction went solo and auditioned for the Dutch music school Rockacademie, and was admitted. Since 2006 he is based in Holland, where he also joined the music competition X Factor. His Reggae Single 'Life is not easy' got three nominations on the Ghanaian Bass Awards and was featured in the German Dutch movie production Verliebt in Amsterdam with Dutch actress Bracha van Doesburgh and German actor Vladimir Burlakov, in which he also performs with his band. Over the years Friction performed as the support act of Reggae legends Morgan Heritage, I Jah Man and Eek-A-Mouse, and on global stages such as Holland's biggest festival Zwarte Cross and UK's biggest Reggae Festival The One Love Festival.

In both 2017 and 2019 Friction got nominated in the category 'Entertainment personality of the year' at the Nima Excellence Awards, an award show to celebrate different types of talent coming out of Nima, Accra, the neighbourhood Friction was born and raised in.
