= Guillermo Rojas Bazan =

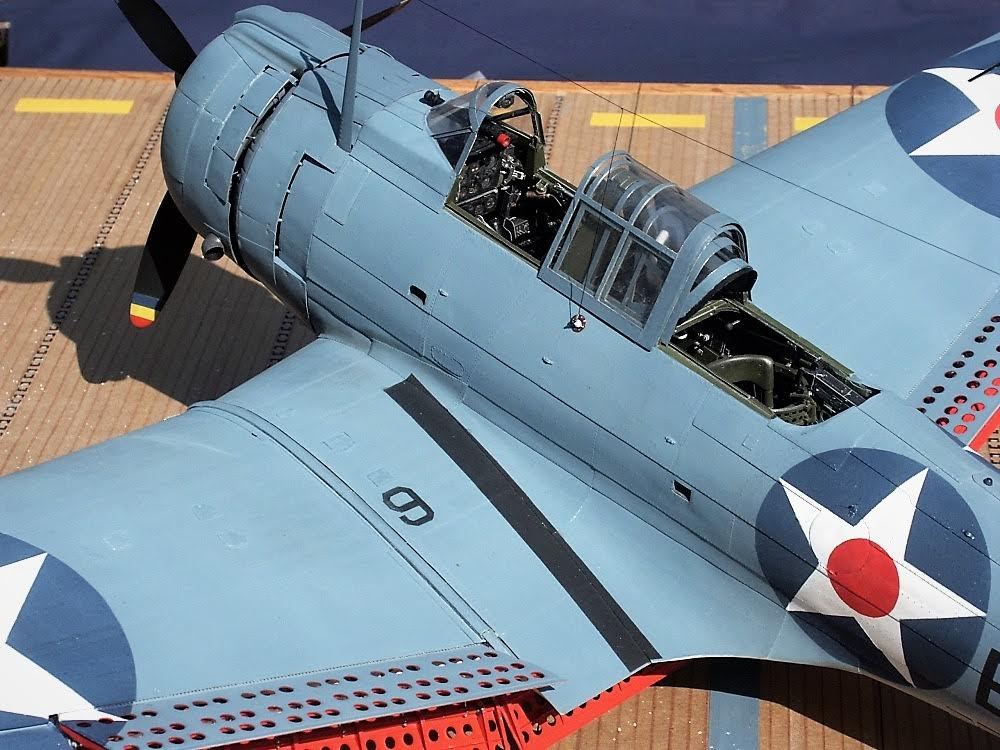
Douglas SBD-3 Dauntless scale model by Guillermo Rojas Bazan

Guillermo Rojas Bazan (born 1949) is an aviation model maker and researcher from Argentina.

During the first forty-five years of his career, while living and working in four countries, he made more than 200 custom models for museums, art galleries, scale model companies, and collectors.

== Life and work ==
Guillermo Rojas Bazan was born in 1949 in Buenos Aires, Argentina. Rojas Bazan received his education in both a technical school and an art school. From 1981 to 1988, Rojas Bazan worked for the Instituto Aeronaval (Naval Air Institute) and the Argentine Air Force. During that time, he worked as a technical draftsman, aircraft illustrator, and designer. Additionally, he was commissioned to build all of the aircraft used in Argentina's Naval history, resulting in ninety-nine aircraft models built.

In 1988, he left Argentina for Spain, where he built models for an aviation art gallery in London and produced replicas for collectors in the United States and Europe. While working for the London gallery, Rojas Bazan was able to choose which models he built, and made several of what he describes as non-commercial models.

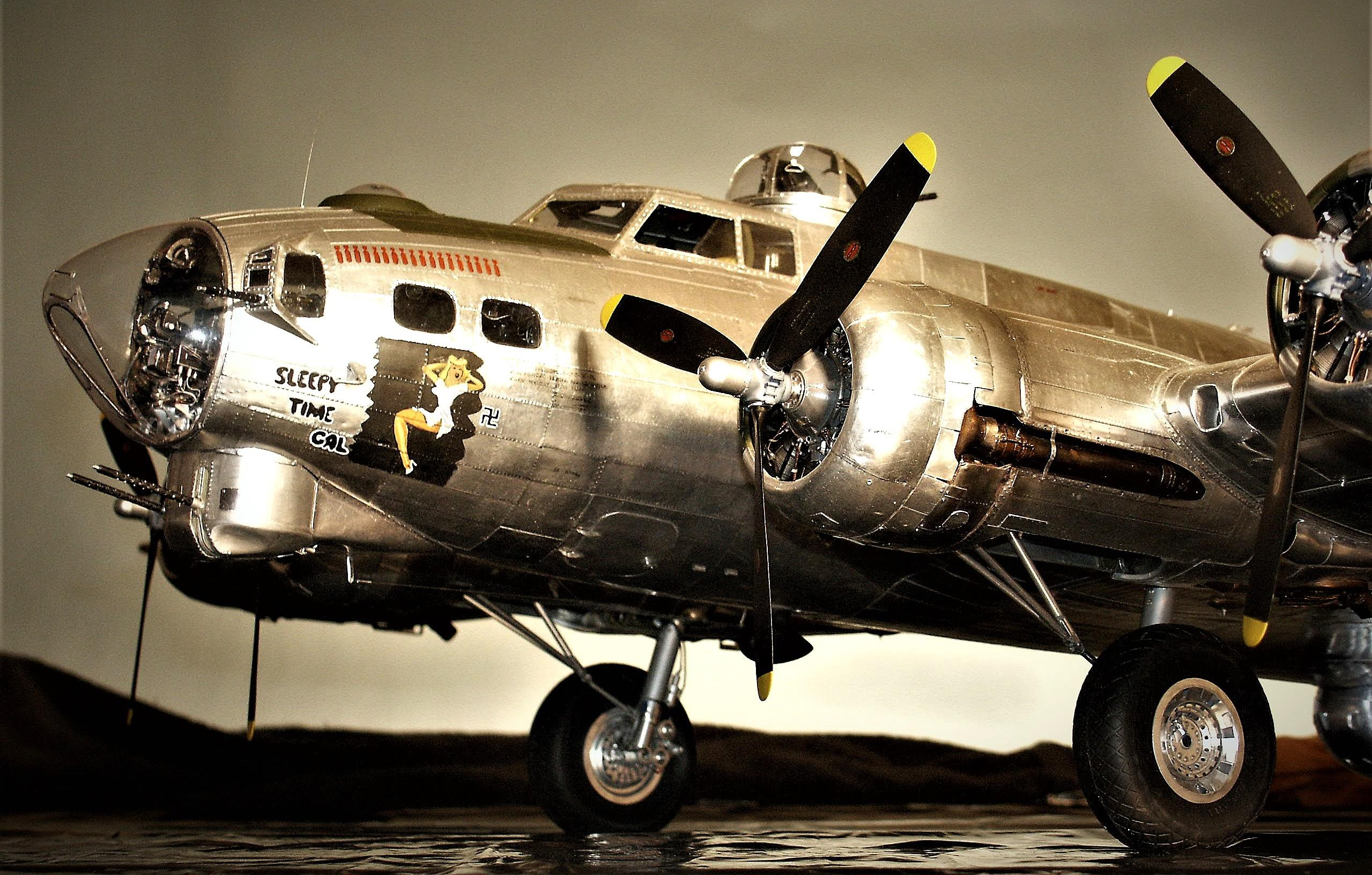
Boeing B-17 Flying Fortress scale model by Guillermo Rojas Bazan

In 1994, he moved to the U.S. and was hired by Fine Art Models, a company located in Royal Oak, Michigan. During his years working for Fine Art Models, he made models in 1/15 scale that were copied in Eastern Europe and sold in limited editions. In recent years, he has worked as a freelance artist for collectors and museums.

== Models ==
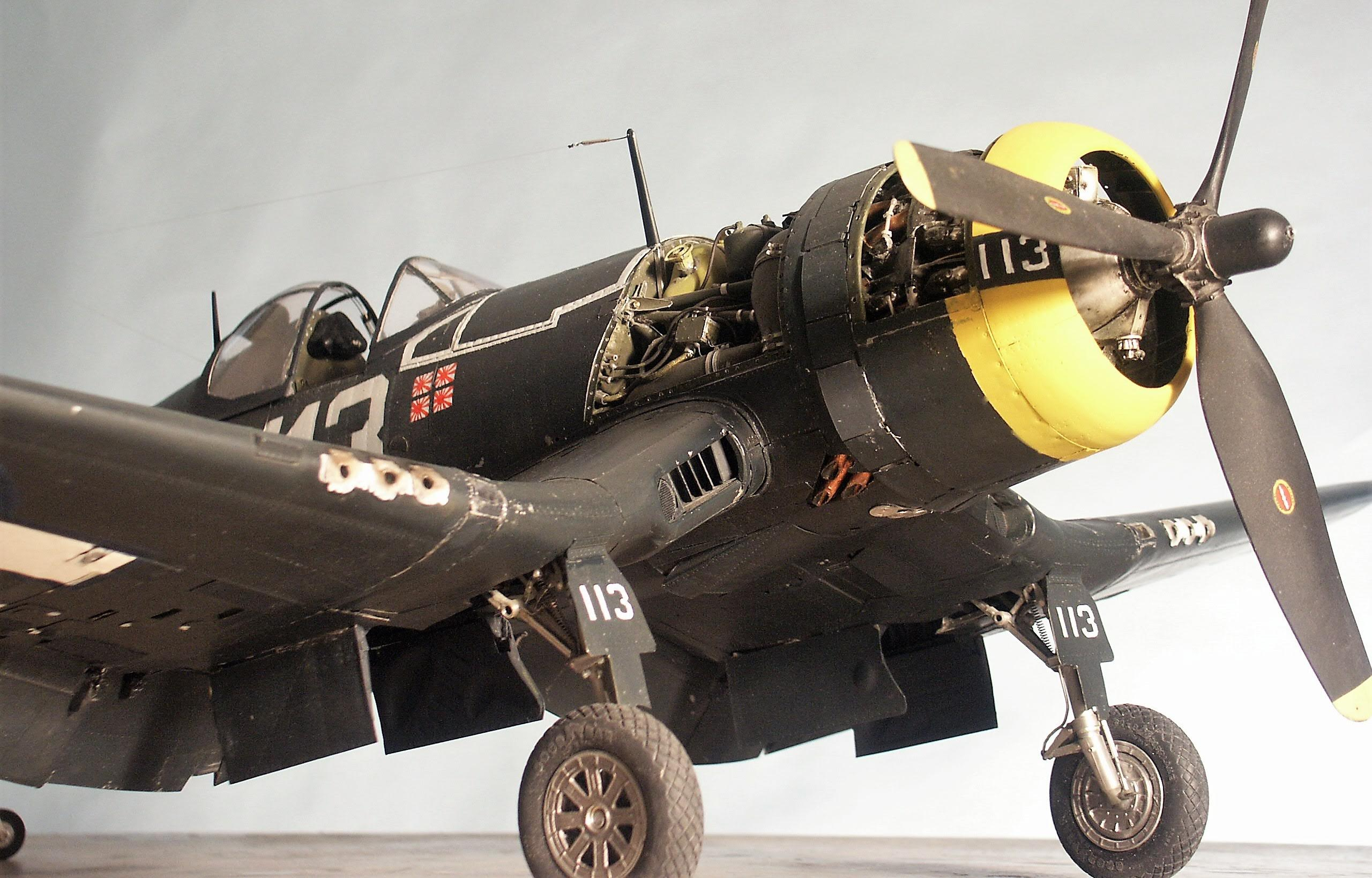
Vought F4U Corsair scale model by Guillermo Rojas Bazan

Rojas Bazan built eighty-seven models for Argentina’s National Museum of the Nation as a result of being commissioned to build every aircraft used in Argentina’s Naval history. He built an additional twelve models that were displayed in different locations in Argentina. At Fine Art Models, he built numerous models including the F-4UD Corsair When asked about which are his favorite models, Rojas Bazan said, 'I do not have only one favorite model, I have several. Many of them are planes from the period between 1920 and 1939, before WWII (golden age of aviation). These include the Northrop Gamma, Boeing B-15, Boeing YB-17 (prototypes on the great B-17), Martin B-10, Vought Vindicator, Curtiss Hawk III, Junkers G-38, Junkers G-24, Heinkel He70, Fairey Battle, etc. Many of these aircraft were not good machines, or have not been very popular, but I like them aesthetically.' His last completed model is a Consolidated B-24H Liberator. It was commissioned by the 467th Bombardment Group (H) Association for the purpose of being displayed at the historic Wendover airfield.

== Recognition ==
- At the North American Model Engineering Expo, Rojas Bazan accepted the Joe Martin Foundation Award for Craftsman of the Year (2013).
- The University of Notre Dame, the U.S. Airforce, and Christie's have given Rojas Bazan letters of recognition.
