= Ghost Story (album) =

Studio album by Phideaux Xavier
- Released: February 4, 2004
- Recorded: NYC
- Genre: Progressive rock
- Length: 50:49
- Label: Bloodfish Media
- Producer: Gabriel Moffat

Phideaux Xavier chronology
Fiendish (2003)	Ghost Story (2004)	Chupacabras (2005)

Professional ratings
Review scores
Source	Rating
Allmusic	link

Ghost Story is the second album released by composer Phideaux Xavier.

After completing Fiendish, Xavier was convinced he had the resources to record his songs from the aborted album Ghost Story. He and drummer Rich Hutchins reunited to redo that album with Gabriel Moffat producing and mixing.

== Tracks ==
1. "Everynight" (05:14)
2. "Feel the Radiation" (04:02)
3. "A Curse of Miracles" (06:25)
4. "Kiteman" (04:30)
5. "Wily Creilly" (05:24)
6. "Beyond the Shadow of Doubt" (07:45)
7. "Ghostforest" (05:45)
8. "Universally" (05:45)
9. "Come Out Tonight" (05:52)

== Personnel ==
- Rich Hutchins – Drums, Gongs, Electric Drums
- Mark Sherkus - Minimoog, Guitars (Solo on 3), Organ, Piano, “Grrrrrr” Synthesizer
- Sam Fenster - Bass (2, 3, 4, 6, 8, 9)
- Gabriel Moffat - Drum Distressments, Textures, Decay, Lead Guitar Cut & Paste, Ambient Loops, Noise Pollution
- Phideaux Xavier - Vocals, Guitars (Acoustic, Volume, Lead, Fuzz), Bass
- Naomi Uman - Maniacal Laugh (7)
