= Toshiyuki Mimaki =

Japanese advocate of nuclear disarmament

- 箕牧 智之
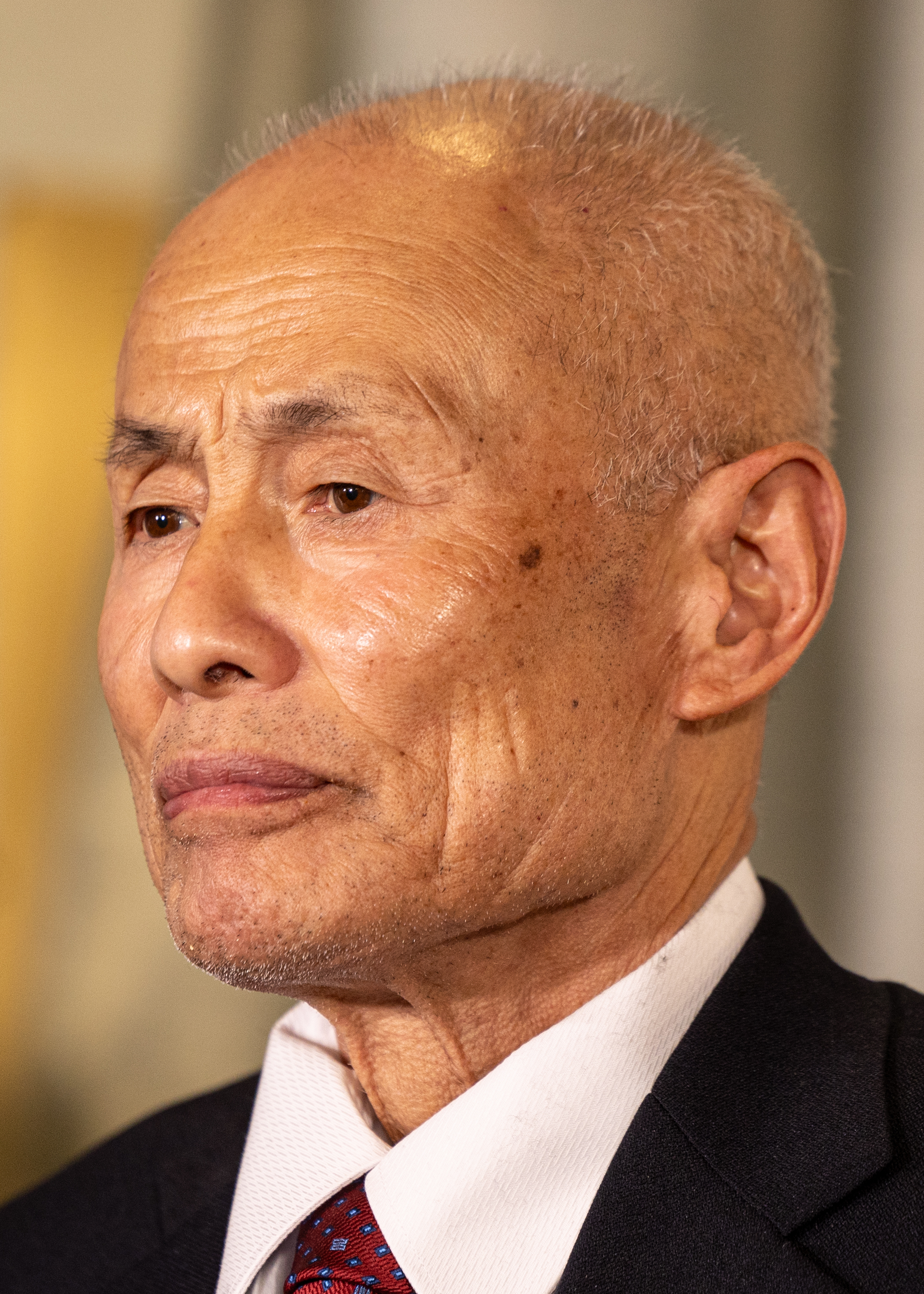
- Mimaki at the 2024 Nobel Prizes in Oslo, Norway
- Born: March 1942 (age 84); Itabashi, Tokyo, Japan
- Occupation: Activist
- Employer: Nihon Hidankyo
- Movement: Nuclear disarmament

Toshiyuki Mimaki (箕牧 智之, Mimaki Toshiyuki; born March 1942) is an activist and co-chair of Nihon Hidankyo, a Japanese organization advocating for nuclear disarmament.

== Early life ==
Mimaki was born in Itabashi, Tokyo in March 1942—his parents had married in January of 1941. In April 1945, Mimaki's family evacuated from the Tokyo metropolis to his father's hometown, Hiroshima, specifically Imuro village near the Utsu railroad crossing. On August 6, 1945, he witnessed the atomic bombing of the city.

After the atomic bombing, Mimaki and his mother searched for his father in the city—he had been missing after leaving for work. On August 8, the three of them reunited. Afterward, Mimaki's family relocated to Kumagaya in Saitama Prefecture, then later to Yamagata Prefecture.

Later, in elementary school, Mimaki contracted a fever that was speculated to have been the result of radiation sickness. With streptomycin, he was able to recover. Mimaki then normally went about middle school and high school, after which he became a lathe operator.

== Career ==
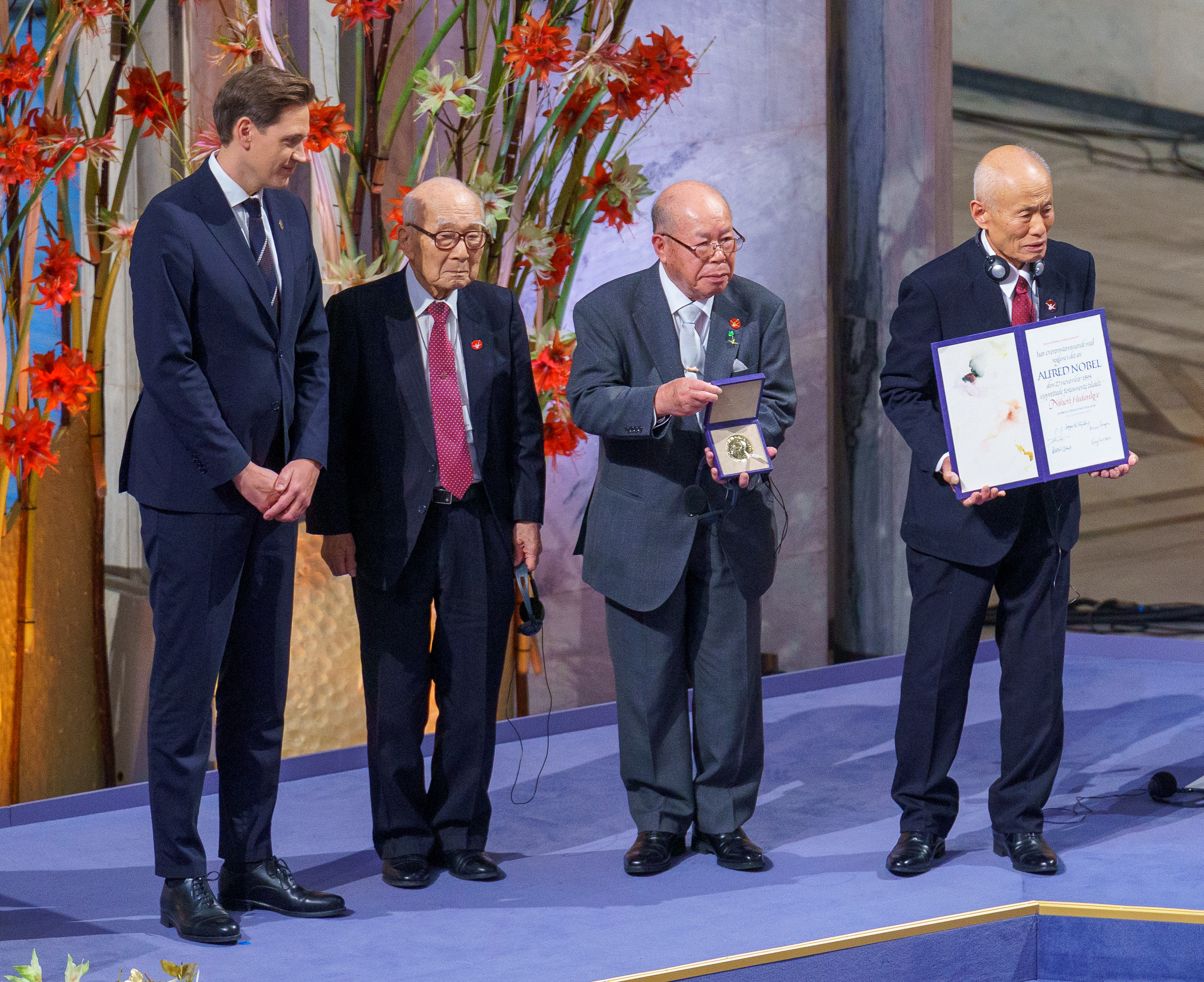
Mimaki (right) accepting the 2024 Nobel Peace Prize alongside Terumi Tanaka (second from left) and Shigemitsu Tanaka (second from right) on behalf of Nihon Hidankyo

Upon further realizing and reflecting upon his position as a hibakusha, Mimaki became the president of the Toyohirahara Society for A-bomb Survivors in 2005. There, he worked and traveled abroad with Sunao Tsuboi to spread awareness about hibakusha and the atomic bombings. In June of 2022, Mimaki became a representative committee member of Nihon Hidankyo, an organization of atomic bombing survivors dedicated to "a world free of nuclear weapons using witness testimony." He serves alongside Terumi Tanaka and Shigemitsu Tanaka.

In 2024, Mimaki, alongside his fellow co-chairs, attended the 2024 Nobel Prizes and accepted the 2024 Nobel Peace Prize on behalf of Nihon Hidankyo. He hoped that the award would lend global credibility to nuclear disarmament and send a message to governments worldwide.

== Political positions ==
As a co-chair of Nihon Hidankyo, Mimaki believes that nuclear weapons must be abolished and has denounced the idea that "nuclear weapons bring peace to the world".

Upon hearing about Nihon Hidankyo's awarding of the 2024 Nobel Peace Prize, Mimaki announced his disbelief at a press conference in Hiroshima's city hall, stating that he expected the award to go to "go to people working for peace in Gaza". Mimaki also stated that the suffering of Palestinians in 2024 was "like in Japan 80 years ago." The statement prompted backlash from Israel's ambassador to Japan.

== Personal life ==
Mimaki resides in Kitahiroshima, a town on the outskirts of Hiroshima.
