= Reiwa era =

Era of Japanese history (2019–present)

Reiwa 令和
- 1 May 2019 – present
Heisei
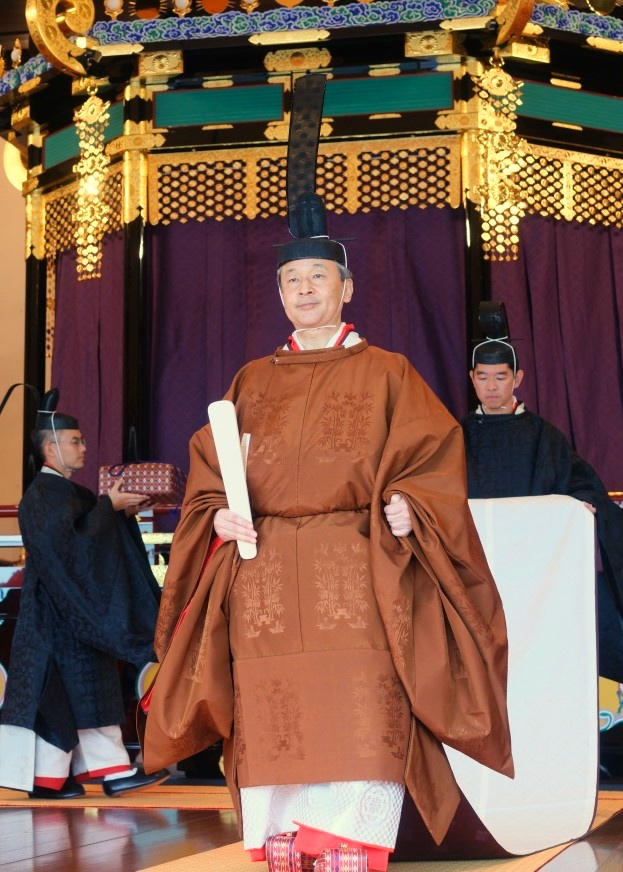
- Emperor Naruhito of the Reiwa era, during his first day of reigning (2019)
- Location: Japan
- Including: Major events: 2019 G20 Osaka summit; COVID-19 pandemic; 2020 Summer Olympics; Assassination of Shinzo Abe and anti-government protests; Attempted assassination of Fumio Kishida; 2023 G7 Hiroshima summit; 2024 Noto earthquake; 2024 Japanese slush fund scandal; 2025 Osaka Expo; 2025-2026 China Dispute
- Monarch: Naruhito
- Prime Ministers: List: Shinzo Abe; Yoshihide Suga; Fumio Kishida; Shigeru Ishiba; Sanae Takaichi

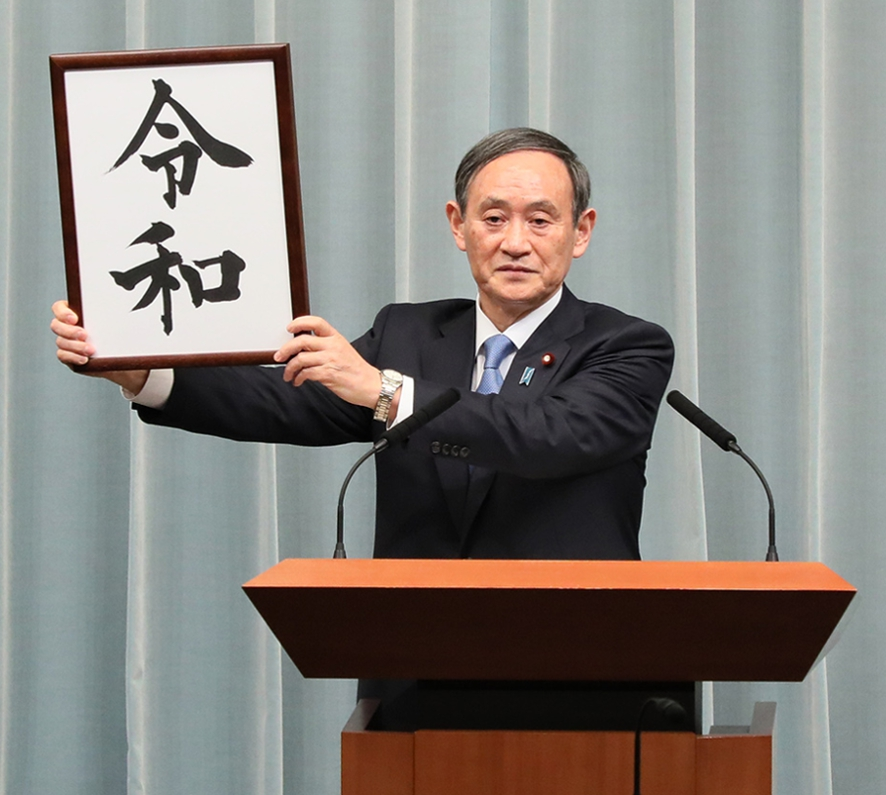
Chief Cabinet Secretary Yoshihide Suga (later to become Prime Minister) announcing to Japan and the world the name of the new Imperial era at a press conference

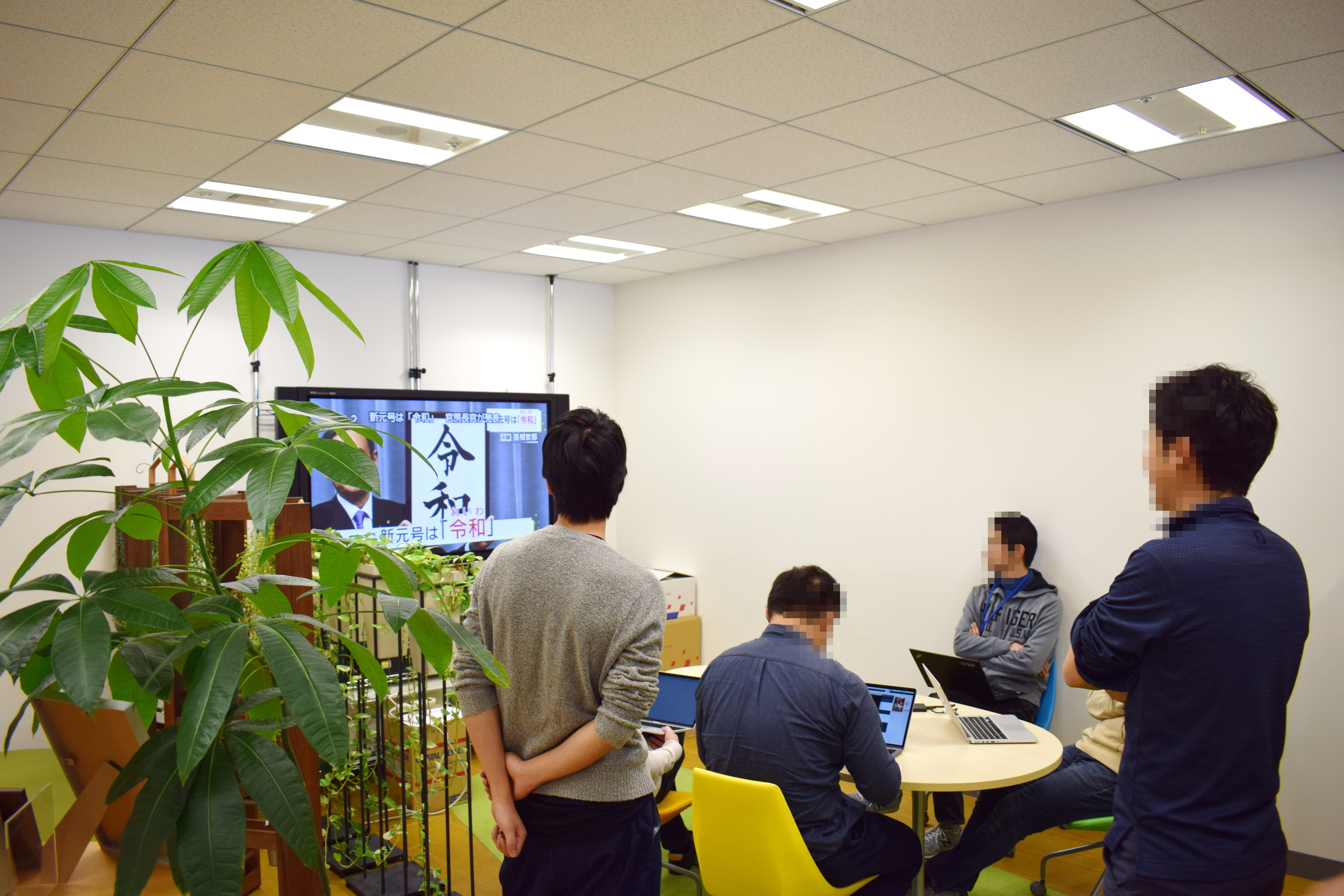
Japanese office workers watching the announcement on a live television broadcast

Reiwa (Japanese: 令和; pronounced [ɾeːwa] or [ɾeꜜːwa]) is the current and 232nd era of the official calendar of Japan. It began on 1 May 2019, the day on which Naruhito was enthroned as the 126th Emperor of Japan. He is the eldest son of Emperor Emeritus Akihito who had abdicated the Chrysanthemum Throne the previous day, marking the end of the Heisei era. The year 2019 corresponds with Heisei 31 from 1 January to 30 April, and with Reiwa 1 (令和元年, Reiwa gannen; 'the base year of Reiwa') from 1 May. The Ministry of Foreign Affairs of Japan explained the meaning of Reiwa to be "beautiful harmony".

== Background ==
=== Announcement ===
The Japanese government on 1 April 2019 announced the name during a live televised press conference, as Chief Cabinet Secretary Yoshihide Suga traditionally revealed the kanji calligraphy on a board. Prime Minister Shinzō Abe said that Reiwa represents "a culture being born and nurtured by people coming together beautifully".

=== Name selection ===
A shortlist of names for the new era was drawn up by a nine-member expert panel comprising seven men and two women with the cabinet selecting the final name from the shortlist. The nine experts were:

- Midori Miyazaki (宮崎緑) – professor at Chiba University of Commerce
- Itsurō Terada (寺田逸郎) – former chief justice of the Supreme Court of Japan
- Shinya Yamanaka (山中伸弥) – Nobel Prize-winning stem-cell scientist, professor at Kyoto University
- Mariko Hayashi (林真理子) – screenwriter and novelist
- Sadayuki Sakakibara (榊原定征) – former chairman of the Japan Business Federation
- Kaoru Kamata (鎌田薫) – trustee and president of Waseda University
- Kōjirō Shiraishi (白石興二郎) – president of the Japan Newspaper Publishers and Editors Association
- Ryōichi Ueda (上田良一) – president of the Japan Broadcasting Corporation
- Yoshio Ōkubo (大久保好男) – president of Nippon Television Holdings

The day after the announcement, the government revealed that the other candidate names under consideration had been Eikō (英弘), Kyūka (久化), Kōshi or Kōji (広至), Banna or Banwa (万和), and Banpo or Banhō (万保), three of which were sourced from two Japanese works, the Kojiki and the Nihon Shoki. Official pronunciations and meanings of these names were not released, although the reading of Eikō was leaked; the other readings are speculative.

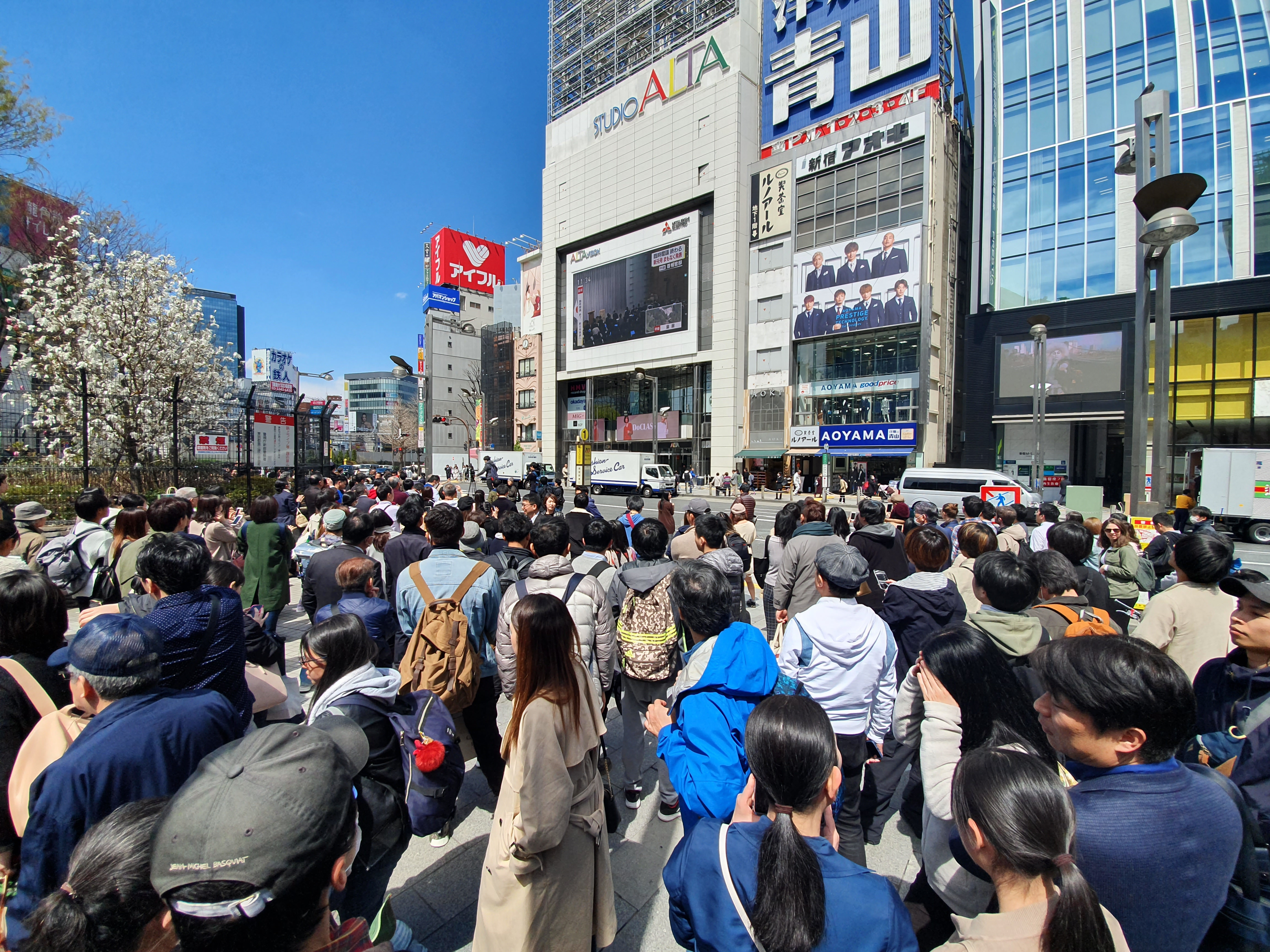
A crowd watching the televised announcement on a giant screen next to Shinjuku Station

=== Origin and meaning ===
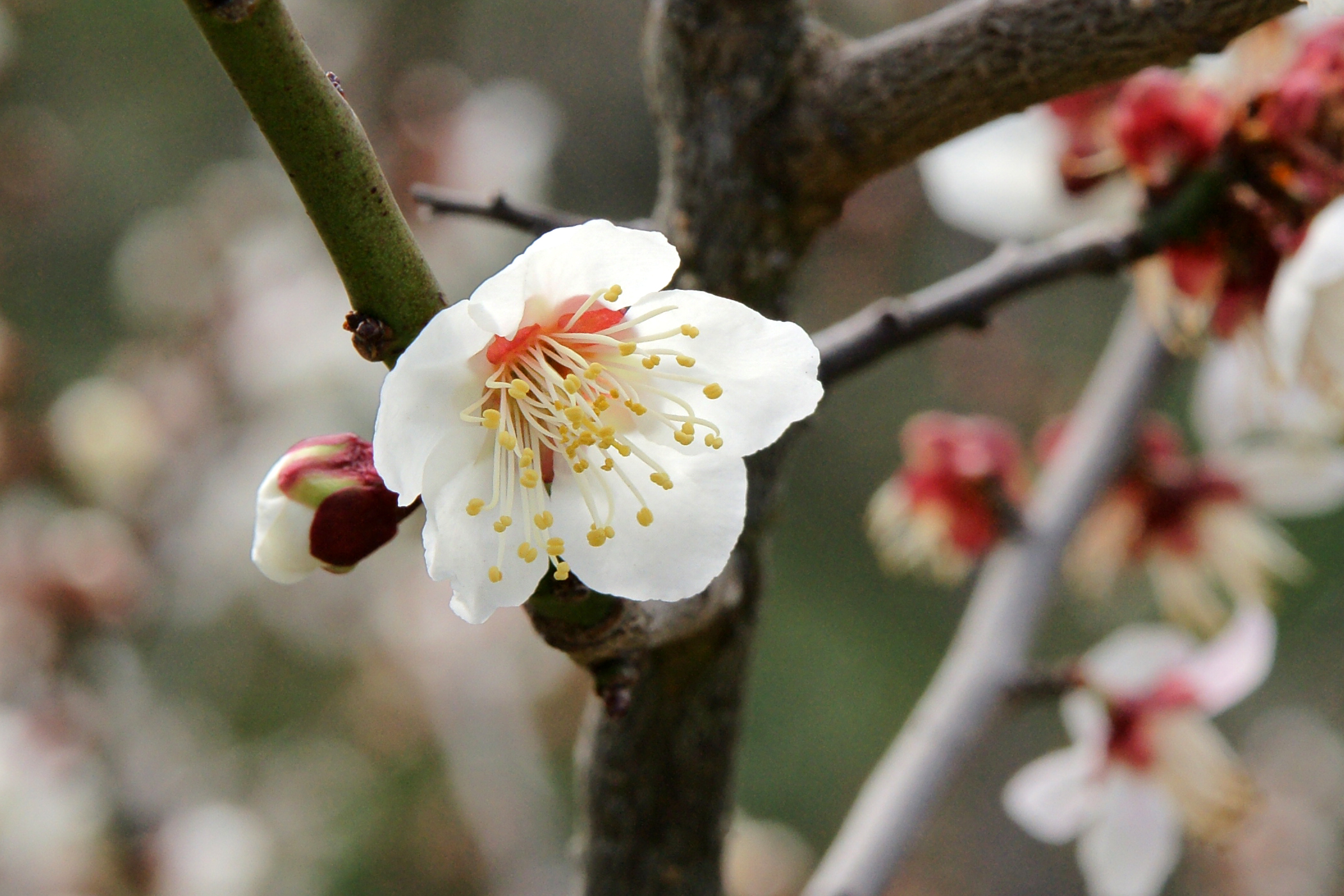
Plum blossoms in Minabe, Wakayama

The kanji characters for Reiwa are derived from the Man'yōshū, an eighth-century (Nara period) anthology of waka poetry. The kotobagaki (headnote) attached to a group of 32 poems (815–846) in Volume 5 of the collection, composed on the occasion of a poetic gathering to view the plum blossoms, reads as follows:

Original Kanbun text: 于時、初春令月、氣淑風和、梅披鏡前之粉、蘭薫珮後之香。

Classical Japanese translation (kanbun kundoku): 時に、初春の令月にして、気淑く風和ぎ、梅は鏡前の粉を披き、蘭は珮後の香を薫す。
Toki ni, shoshun no reigetsu ni shite, kiyoku kaze yawaragi, ume wa kyōzen no ko o hiraki, ran wa haigo no kō o kaorasu.

English translation:

It was in new spring, in a fair (rei) month,
When the air was clear and the wind a gentle (wa) breeze.
Plum flowers blossomed a beauty's charming white

And the fragrance of the orchids was their sweet perfume.

The Japanese Foreign Ministry provided an English-language interpretation of Reiwa as "beautiful harmony", to counter reports that "Rei" (令) here is translated as "command" or "order" – which are the significantly more common meanings of the character, especially so in both modern Japanese and Chinese. The Foreign Ministry also noted that "beautiful harmony" is rather an explanation than an official translation or a legally binding interpretation.

Prior to and naturally irrespective of the era announcement, within the context of the Chinese essay in the Man'yōshū from which the excerpt is cited, the expression 令月 (which characters constitute the word reigetsu in modern Japanese) has generally been academically translated or interpreted as "wonderful" or "good (Japanese: yoi) month" in published scholarly works, such as by Alexander Vovin in English as wonderful month in his 2011 commentary and translation of Book 5, or by Susumu Nakanishi in Japanese as yoi tsuki (好い月) in his commentary and translation into modern Japanese that was published in 1978.

Susumu Nakanishi, a scholar of Japanese literature, particularly of the Man'yōshū, is widely believed to have conceived the name Reiwa. Following the announcement of Reiwa in 2019, Nakanishi advocated for understanding the character rei (令) of the era name through the help of the Japanese word uruwashii (うるわしい; fair (of sight, weather), beautiful, fine (also of mood) etc.), stressing that in the traditional dictionaries (such as Erya or the Kangxi Dictionary), the word 令 is explained with the word 善. Nakanishi criticized the understanding of the rei (令) in Reiwa as Japanese utsukushii (美しい; generally meaning "beautiful"), which was propagated by then-Prime Minister Shinzo Abe, pointing out that neither the etymology nor the exact sense are appropriate.

== Novelty ==
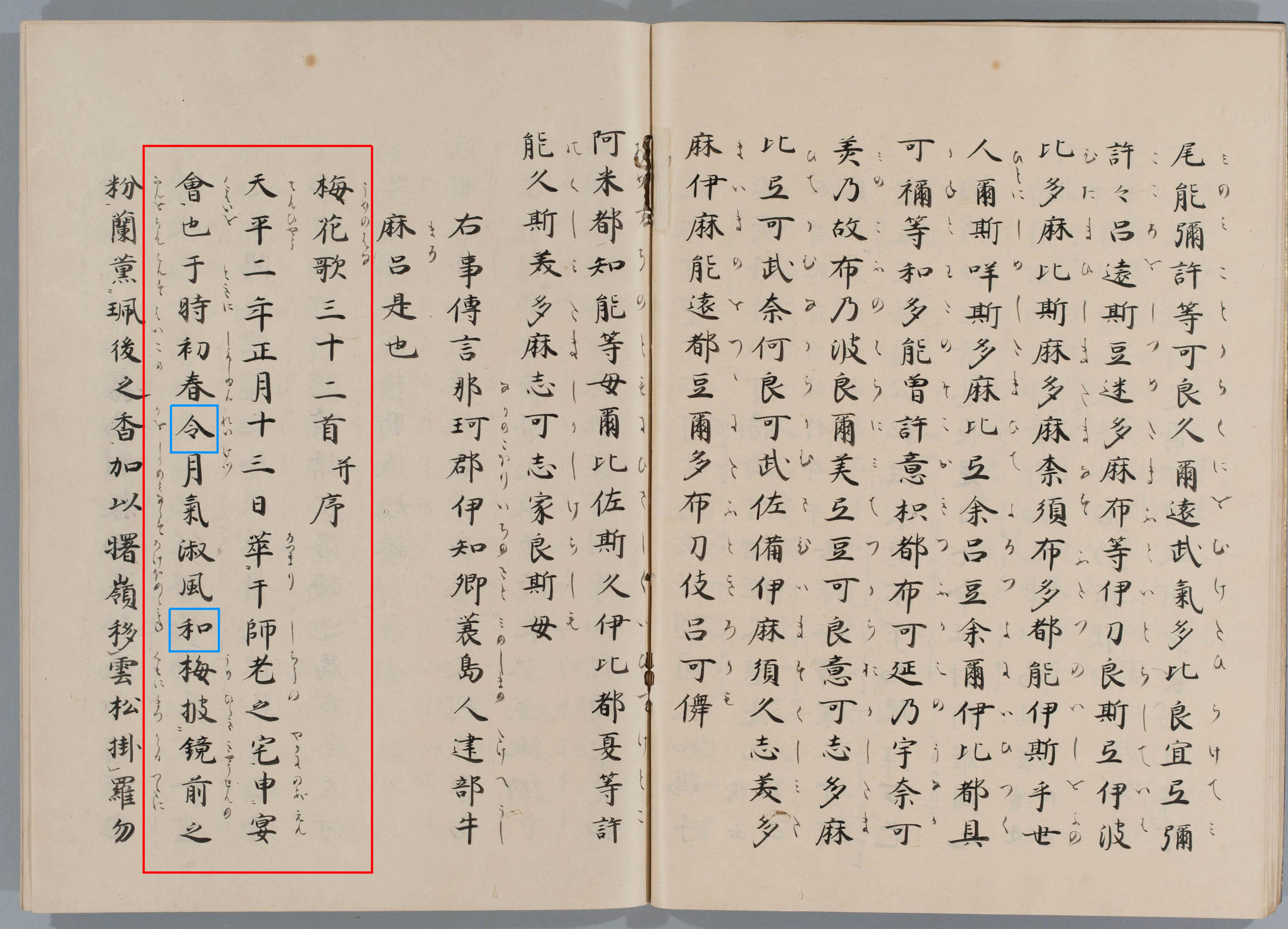
Extract of Volume 5 of the Man'yōshū from which the kanji characters for "Reiwa" are derived

"Reiwa" marks the first Japanese era name with characters that were taken from Japanese literature instead of classic Chinese literature.

Robert Campbell, director-general of National Institute of Japanese Literature in Tokyo, provided an official televised interpretation to NHK, regarding the characters based on the poem, noting that "Rei" is an auspicious wave of energy of the plum blossoms carried by the wind, and "Wa", the general character of peace and tranquility.

Accordingly, the name marks the 248th era name designated in Japanese history. While the "wa" character 和 has been used in 19 previous era names, the "rei" character 令 has never appeared before. The character appeared in a proposed era name in 1864—Reitoku (令徳)—that the ruling Tokugawa shogunate rejected, as it could be interpreted as the emperor commanding (rei) the Tokugawa.

On the other hand, according to Masaaki Tatsumi (辰巳正明), professor of Japanese literature, and Masaharu Mizukami (水上雅晴), professor of Chinese philosophy, interviewed by the Asahi Shimbun shortly after the announcement was made, the phrase has an earlier source in ancient Chinese literature dating back to the second century AD, on which the Man'yōshū usage is allegedly based:

於是仲春令月，時和氣清；原隰鬱茂，百草茲榮。
Yú shì zhòng chūn lìng yuè, shí hé qì qīng; yuán xí yù mào, bǎi cǎo zī róng.

— Zhang Heng, Return to the Field

Then comes young spring, in a fine month,
When the wind is mild and the air clear.
Plains and swamps are overgrown with verdure
And the hundred grasses become rank and thick.

— translation by Liu Wu-chi, An Introduction to Chinese Literature (1990)

== Implementation ==
=== Currency ===
According to the Japan Mint, all coins with the new era name have been released since October 2019. It takes three months to make preparations such as creating molds in order to input text or pictures. The Mint will prioritize creating 100- and 500-yen coins due to their high mintage and circulation, with an anticipated release by the end of July 2019.

=== Technology ===
Anticipating the coming of the new era, the Unicode Consortium reserved a code point (U+32FF ㋿ SQUARE ERA NAME REIWA) in September 2018 for a new glyph which will combine half-width versions of Reiwa's kanji, 令 and 和, into a single character; similar code points exist for earlier era names, including Shōwa (U+337C ㍼ SQUARE ERA NAME SYOUWA) and Heisei (U+337B ㍻ SQUARE ERA NAME HEISEI) periods. The resulting new version of Unicode, 12.1.0, was released on 7 May 2019.

Updates were released for Windows, macOS, and iOS to support the new era.

== Events ==
On 19 November 2019, Shinzo Abe became the longest-serving prime minister of Japan and surpassed the previous 2,883-day record of Katsura Tarō. Abe also beat Eisaku Satō's record of 2,798 consecutive days on 23 August 2020. He resigned for health reasons in September 2020 and was succeeded by Yoshihide Suga.

In early 2020, Japan began to suffer from the COVID-19 pandemic as several countries reported a significant increase in cases by March 2020. Japan and other countries donated masks, medical equipment, and money to China.

In June 2020, Fugaku was declared the most powerful supercomputer in the world with a performance of 415.53 PFLOPS. Fugaku also ranked first place in computational methods performance for industrial use, artificial intelligence applications, and big data analytics. It was co-developed by the RIKEN research institute and Fujitsu.

Because of the COVID-19 Pandemic, the 2020 Tokyo Olympics were postponed until the summer of 2021.

In September 2021, Suga announced he would not stand in the Liberal Democratic Party leadership election, effectively ending his term as prime minister. He was succeeded by Fumio Kishida who took office as prime minister on 4 October 2021. Kishida was elected leader of the ruling Liberal Democratic Party (LDP) a week prior. He was officially confirmed as the country's 100th prime minister following a parliamentary vote.

The first general election under the Reiwa era took place on 31 October 2021. The LDP retained its majority despite losing seats.

In March 2022, Japan joined sanctions against Russia following the Russian invasion of Ukraine as the first Asian country to exert pressure on Russia.

In July 2022, former prime minister Shinzo Abe was assassinated by Tetsuya Yamagami in Nara. By comparison, Japan had only 10 gun related deaths from 2017 to 2021 and 1 gun fatality in 2021.

On 16 December 2022, Second Kishida Cabinet announced a departure from Japan's defense-oriented policy by acquiring counterstrike capabilities and a defense budget increase to 2% of GDP by 2027. This comes amidst growing security concerns over China, North Korea and Russia. This will make Japan the 3rd largest defense-spender ($315 billion) after the United States and China.

On 1 January 2024, a magnitude 7.5 earthquake struck Ishikawa Prefecture in the Noto Peninsula, which killed 213 people and caused many more injuries.

Following the 2024 Japanese slush fund scandal, Japanese Prime Minister Fumio Kishida warned that three factions of Liberal Democratic Party (Seiwa Seisaku Kenkyūkai, Kōchikai, and Shisuikai) all announced their intention to dissolve to form a war cabinet. However, several LDP lawmakers were indicted, including incumbent lawmakers Yasutada Ōno and Yaichi Tanigawa, who both resigned from the party following their indictments. Kishida became a controversial figure in Japanese politics, and due to his negative approval ratings, stepped down in September 2024 to be replaced as Prime Minister by Shigeru Ishiba.

On 19 January 2024, Japan becomes the fifth country to successfully land on the surface of the Moon with the Smart Lander for Investigating Moon (SLIM) lunar lander mission.

On 14 August 2024, Kishida announced that he would not stand in Liberal Democratic Party leadership election due to the lowest approval rating, effectively ending his three-year-term as prime minister, and thereby not seeking re-election in September of the same year. During the LDP leadership election, Kishida initially endorsed Chief Cabinet Secretary Yoshimasa Hayashi, then, in the second round, whipped votes for Shigeru Ishiba, who defeated Sanae Takaichi to become the next party leader and prime minister.

Shigeru Ishiba was elected by the National Diet and appointed as Prime Minister by Emperor Naruhito at Tokyo Imperial Palace on 1 October 2024, becoming the 101st and 25th Liberal Democratic Prime Minister. Ishiba announced key appointments ahead of Japanese general election, held on 27 October 2024. His Cabinet included rivals from the leadership race, though Sanae Takaichi's exclusion created internal party friction. Uniting the divided ruling party became a primary focus for Ishiba after the closely contested leadership race.

Nihon Hidankyo, a group of Japan Confederation of A- and H-Bomb Sufferers Organizations, was awarded 2024 Nobel Peace Prize in October 2024 for its efforts to achieve a world free of nuclear weapons. The organization received the award, held in Oslo, Norway, on December 10 of the same year. It is one of the second Japanese laureate to win this prize, less than 50 years since former Japanese Prime Minister Eisaku Satō win this prize in 1974, as well.

During his premiership, then-Japanese Prime Minister Shigeru Ishiba has economically moved his country closer to India and South Korea amidst protectionist policies being employed by the United States of America, while continuing to support Ukraine during the Russian invasion that began February 2022, as well as support Israel during the Gaza war. After LDP-Komeito coalition lost its majority in the House of Councillors following the poor result in 2025 upper election, Ishiba initially announced that he planned to remain as Prime Minister, citing the need to see through tariff negotiations with the United States. After a trade deal, on 22 July 2025, it was erroneously reported that Shigeru Ishiba would be resign by early September. Eventually, he announced his intention to resigned as a LDP president and Prime Minister on 7 September 2025. During the LDP leadership election, Ishiba initially endorsed Chief Cabinet Secretary Yoshimasa Hayashi, then, in the second round, whipped votes for Sanae Takaichi, who defeated Shinjirō Koizumi to become the next party leader and the first female prime minister.

=== The Nobel Prize ===
- 2019 – Akira Yoshino, Chemistry
- 2021 – Syukuro Manabe, Physics
- 2025 – Shimon Sakaguchi, Physiology or Medicine
- 2025 – Susumu Kitagawa, Chemistry
- 2026 – Kensō Soai, Chemistry

=== Nobel Peace Prize ===
- 2024 – Nihon Hidankyo

== Conversion table ==
To convert any Gregorian calendar year since 2019 to Japanese calendar year in Reiwa era, subtract 2018 from the year in question.

Reiwa	1	2	3	4	5	6	7	8
AD/CE	2019	2020	2021	2022	2023	2024	2025	2026

== See also ==
- 2019 in Japan
- 2020 in Japan
- 2021 in Japan
- 2022 in Japan
- 2023 in Japan
- 2024 in Japan
- 2025 in Japan
- 2026 in Japan

Preceded by Heisei (平成)	Era of Japan; Reiwa (令和); 1 May 2019 – present	Most recent
