= Kido =

Kido or KIDO may refer to:

- Kido (surname)
- KIDO, an American radio station
- Kidō, a form of magic used by characters in the manga and anime Bleach
- Conficker or Kido, computer worm
- Gao Hanyu or Kido, Chinese actor and singer
