= Masako Wada =

Japanese hibakusha, or survivor of the atomic bombings of Hiroshima and Nagasaki

Masako Wada (和田 征子, Wada Masako; born 1943) is a Japanese hibakusha as a survivor of the 1945 atomic bombing of Nagasaki, who is assistant secretary general of Nihon Hidankyo (Japan Confederation of A- and H-Bomb Sufferers Organizations). As one of the youngest remaining hibakusha, Wada believes it is necessary to preserve the learned experiences of her fellow survivors, so that their unique perspectives are not lost to time. She has spent decades advocating for nuclear disarmament and spreading public awareness of the horrors of nuclear war.

Wada's central beliefs are that humanity has a moral responsibility to cease the production and usage of nuclear weapons, and that international governments must provide reparations for victims. She believes that any alternatives to total disarmament are ineffective because they fail to approach the subject from an ethical standpoint. For instance, she has claimed that deterrence theory is not sufficient justification for preserving nuclear weapons because it relies on the morally unacceptable threat of mutual destruction.

== Early life and education ==
Masako Wada was born in October 1943, in Nagasaki City. In 1945, when she was 22 months old, she was exposed to the atomic bomb dropped on Nagasaki City (2.9 kilometers from Ground Zero), but was protected from serious harm by mountainous terrain of the region. While she was too young to remember the event, she grew up hearing detailed stories of the devastation and suffering from her mother.

"[...] On August 9, after an air-raid warning was lifted, my mother was preparing lunch. I was playing alone on the floor of the entrance. At 11:02, she heard a big sound of an explosion. the next moment, windowpanes, sliding doors, and clay walls inside our house were all blown to pieces by the blast. A pile of mud and dust over 30 centimeters thick was left on the floor. Outside, my mother saw orange-colored smoke, which veiled the houses on the other side of the street. The green trees on the mountainsides surrounding the downtown area had turned brown. On the mountain roads, she saw a file of people escaping from fires like ants, moving down over the mountain toward our area. They all looked brown with their scantily clad bodies burned all over and with their hair matted with blood and standing on end like horns. The empty lot next to our house became a cremation ground, where dead bodies collected by garbage carts were brought in and incinerated day after day. My mother said that everyone soon became numb to the growing number of corpses and even to the stench from burning bodies. What is human dignity? Humans are not created to be treated like this."

She graduated from the English Department of Meiji Gakuin University, then spent a number of years as an English teacher in Nagasaki. She then moved to the United States with her husband, eventually returning to Japan in the 1980s.

She is a member of the United Church of Christ in Japan, and claims that her faith has played a significant role in shaping her activism.

== Activism ==
Wada joined Nihon Hidankyo after returning to Japan. After decades of membership, she became assistant secretary general in 2015. After meeting with fellow hibakusha Setsuko Thurlow in 2016, she was inspired to travel the world, sharing her mother's testimonies in the hopes of shifting public opinion in favor of disarmament. Wada has emphasized that it is especially important to speak with younger generations, as the number of hibakusha is decreasing with time, and she fears that the world will eventually forget the dire consequences of nuclear warfare. To this end, she frequently speaks at various schools and youth organizations, including Brooklyn College, the Middlebury Institute of International Studies at Monterey, and many others.

In addition to her efforts toward increasing public awareness, she plays in active role in appealing to international governments and scientific organizations. After becoming assistant secretary general, Wada has focused much of her efforts toward increasing approval for the Treaty on the Prohibition of Nuclear Weapons. Although the treaty was passed on 20 September 2017, it excluded all nuclear weapon states. In the years following this development, she has continued to appeal toward the remaining nuclear weapon states to sign the treaty, and maintains hope that future generations will carry on the fight.

- In 2016, Wada and other hibakusha sent a letter to United States President Barack Obama in anticipation of his upcoming visit to the Hiroshima Peace Memorial Ceremony. In this letter, they urged the president to "meet the hibakusha and hear their experiences of the indescribable hell on earth, learn firsthand the damage and aftereffects of the atomic bombing and look at the A-bomb remnants and materials."
- In November of 2017, she attended a conference in Vatican City to speak on behalf of hibakusha and convince the Holy See to sign the Treaty on the Prohibition of Nuclear Weapons.
- In August of 2022, Wada attended a conference hosted by the Japan NGO Network for Nuclear Weapons Abolition, where she would criticize existing methods of nuclear war prevention, such as the Treaty on the Non-Proliferation of Nuclear Weapons. Pointing to recent incidents like Vladimir Putin's threats to use nuclear weapons in the ongoing Russian invasion of Ukraine, she claimed that existing treaties are not doing enough to prevent nuclear escalation.
- In anticipation of the second meeting of state parties to the Treaty on the Prohibition of Nuclear Weapons, which was set to begin in late November of 2023, she visited the Ministry of Foreign Affairs as a representative of Nihon Hidankyo. Wada attempted to convince ministry officials to sign the treaty, but was unsuccessful.
- In July of 2025, Wada represented Nihon Hidankyo at the Nobel Laureate Assembly for the Prevention of Nuclear War at the University of Chicago. In her speech, she criticized the idea of nuclear sharing as an alternative to disarmament, stating that any nation that possesses nuclear weapons has the potential to become an aggressor, even previously victimized countries like Japan.

== Awards ==
Nihon Hidankyo won the 2024 Nobel Peace Prize. Wada represented the organization for the Nobel Committee telephone interview following the announcement of the award, and subsequently also attended the ceremony in Oslo on December 10, 2024.
