= Anil Ananthaswamy =

Award-winning science journalist and author

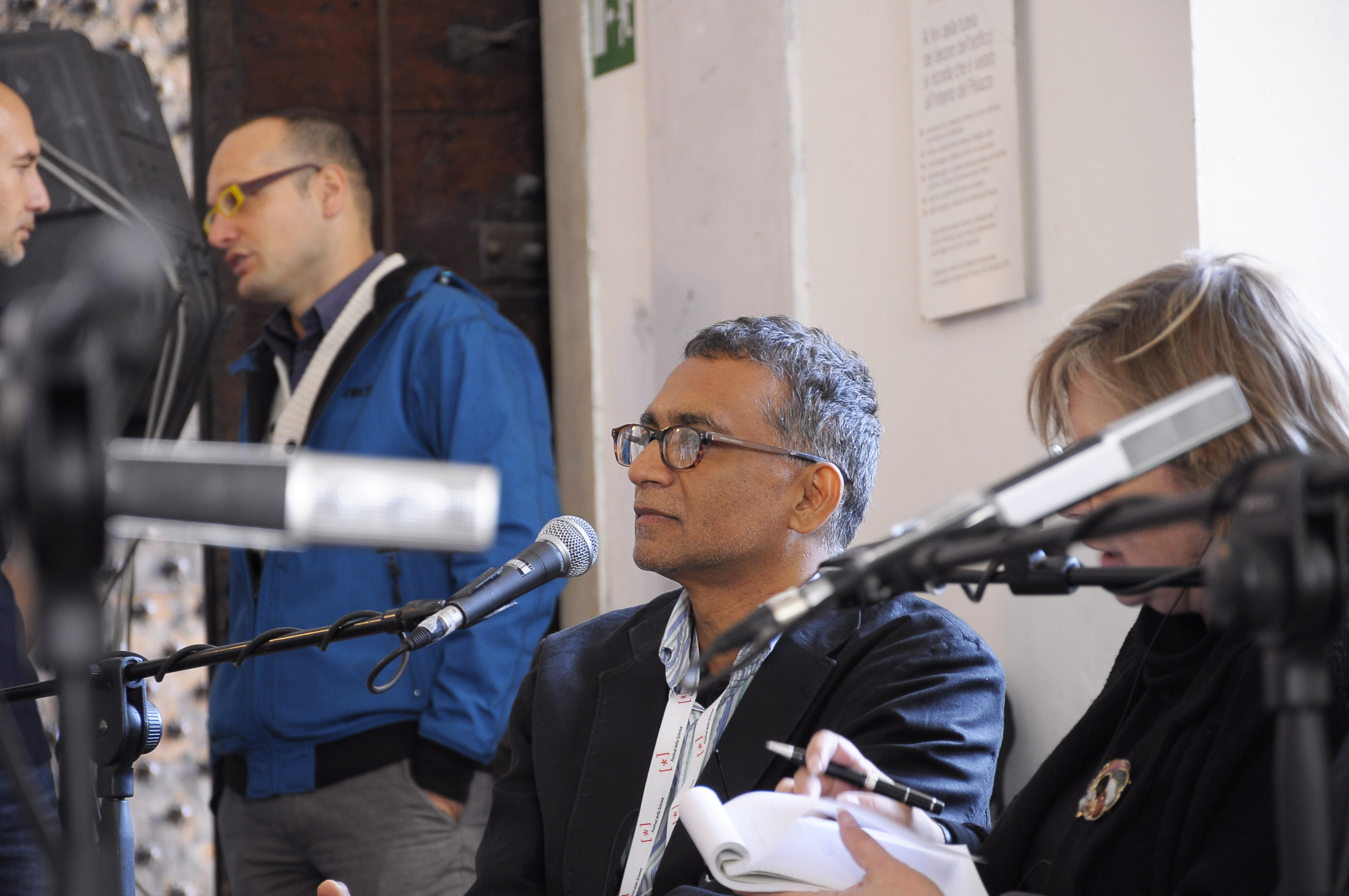
- At the Festival della Scienza, in Genoa, Italy (2011).
- Born: Bhilai, Chattisgarh, India
- Education: University of California, Santa Cruz, University of Washington Seattle (MS), Indian Institute of Technology, Madras (BTech).
- Website: https://anilananthaswamy.com/

Anil Ananthaswamy is an Indian-American award-winning science journalist, author, and the former deputy news editor at New Scientist. His writings, on physics, astronomy, quantum theory, neuroscience, and computer science, have regularly featured on publications including New Scientist, Quanta, Scientific American, PNS Front Matter, Nature, Nautilus, Matter, The Wall Street Journal, Discover, and the UK's Literary Review. In 2019, Ananthaswamy was fellow under the Knight Science Journalism program at the Massachusetts Institute of Technology. In 2024, his latest book, Why Machines Learn, received widespread acclaim, with Nobel laureate and AI pioneer Geoff Hinton, labelling it a "masterpiece."

Since 2011, Ananthaswamy organizes and teaches an annual two-week science journalism workshop to a cohort of ten science writers and journalists from across India, at the National Centre for Biological Sciences, Bengaluru. Until April 2025, he was journalist-in-residence at the Simon Institute for the Theory of Computing, University of California, Berkeley.

In 2026, Ananthaswamy joined the Indian Institute of Technology, Madras (IIT-M) as Professor of Practice in the Department of Data Science and Artificial Intelligence.

== Education ==
In 1985, Ananthaswamy graduated with a BTech from the Indian Institute of Technology, Madras (IIT-M) in electronics and electrical engineering. Following a two-year masters degree at the University of Washington Seattle, he worked on distributed systems as a software engineer at Silicon Valley through the 1990s.

Devoid of a sense of fulfillment coding, Ananthaswamy rediscovered his passion for writing and publishing novels thereafter. He embarked on a career shift then, having enrolled at University of California, Santa Cruz graduate program in science communication. In 2000, he interned for six-months at New Scientist in London, following graduation.

== Notable works ==
Before his foray into science writing, Ananthaswamy had already been a published author, with a textbook discussing object-oriented programming and data structures published in 1995.

In 2010, his debutant pop-sci book, The Edge of Physics, was voted book of the year by UK's Physics World. The same year, he was awarded the Institute of Physics (IOP)'s inaugural Physics Journalism Prize, in recognition of his long-form feature published in the March edition that year of New Scientist, "Hip Hip Array", which detailed plans to build the Square Kilometre Array, an ambitious radio telescope in Australia, with receiver dishes covering a square kilometer in area. His second book, The Man Who Wasn't There, was long listed for the 2016 PEN/E. O. Wilson Literary Science Writing Award. In 2018, he followed through with a third, Through Two Doors at Once, which featured among Smithsonian's favorite books of the year, and in Forbes' best book list on Astronomy, Physics, and Mathematics

In 2013, he won an award for best investigative journalism, for a long-form feature for MATTER magazine on “Body Integrity Identity Disorder”, a neurological condition in which people feel that their limbs do not belong to them and go to great lengths to self-amputate.

== Books ==
- The Edge of Physics (2010)
- The Man Who Wasn't There (2015)
- Through Two Doors at Once (2018)
- Why Machines Learn (2024)
