= Khaing Zar Aung =

Burmese union leader and human rights activist

- Born: May 1984
- Occupation: Union organizer, human rights defender, trade unionist
- Position held: secretary (2010s–)

Khaing Zar Aung (in Burmese: ခိုင်ဇာအောင် (Khaing Zā Aung)), born in May 1984, is a Burmese union leader and human rights activist. A unionist since her teenage years, she emigrated to Thailand before being allowed to return to Myanmar at the end of the military junta. She joined the Industrial Workers Federation of Myanmar (IWFM) and became its general secretary.

During her tenure, she focused on unionizing women in the rapidly growing textile industry in the country. Following the return of dictatorship after the 2021 coup in Myanmar, she struggled to resist as best as she could, eventually managing to go into exile and reach Germany, while continuing her activism from abroad.

She has been nominated for the 2024 Nobel Peace Prize.

== Biography ==
Zar Aung has seven siblings and comes from a poor family. She left school early to work and was hired in a textile factory at 16 by lying about her age in 2000. She joined a union as soon as she started working. Fired on the pretext of her age, she moved to Thailand, where she continued her union activities, notably organizing Burmese migrants who were with her. With the gradual return of a form of democracy, she was allowed to return to her country and joined the Industrial Workers’ Federation of Myanmar (IWFM).

Later, she became its leader and organized the labour movement in Myanmar in a very complex situation for human and union rights. The unionist achieved victories and sought, in particular, to empower women working in the country's textile industry. Despite these victories, she had to face an increasingly tense situation in the country.

After the 2021 coup in Myanmar, the situation became abysmal and very volatile. Zar Aung urges multinational corporations to leave the country. She managed to exile to Germany, where she continued her efforts to organize the Burmese labour movement from abroad.

In 2024, she received the Arthur Svensson international prize for trade union rights. She was nominated for the 2024 Nobel Peace Prize.
