= Kido (surname) =

Kido (written: 木戸 lit. "tree door" or "wooden door", or 城戸 lit. "castle door") is a Japanese surname.

== Notable people with the surname ==
- Akiyuki Kido (木戸 章之; born 1975), Japanese ice dancer
- Ibuki Kido (木戸 衣吹; born 1997), Japanese voice actress
- Junko Kido (木戸 順子; 1956–2020), Japanese singer better known as Junko Hirotani
- Kōichi Kido (木戸 幸一; 1889–1977), minister of the Cabinet of Japan during World War II
- Koki Kido (木戸 皓貴; born 1995), Japanese professional footballer
- Markis Kido (1984–2021), Indonesian badminton player
- Kido Matsuko (木戸 松子; 1843–1886), Japanese noblewoman and former geisha
- Osamu Kido (木戸 修; 1950–2023), Japanese professional wrestler
- Rasta Kido (城戸 良星; born 1997), Japanese kickboxer
- Saburo Kido (城戸三郎; 1902–1977), Japanese-American lobbyist, attorney, newspaper editor
- Shintarō Kido (木戸 新太郎; 1916–1975), Japanese dancer and actor
- Shunzo Kido (城戸 俊三; 1889–1986), Japanese equestrian
- Sueichi Kido (木戸 季市; born 1940), Japanese professor emeritus, survivor of Nagasaki atomic bombing
- Taisei Kido (木戸 大聖; born 1996), Japanese actor
- Kido Takayoshi (木戸 孝允; 1833–1877), Japanese politician of the Meiji Government
- Yasuhiro Kido (城戸 康裕; born 1982), Japanese kickboxer

== Fictional characters ==
- Joe Kido, character from the Digimon animated series
- Madoka Kido, character from the School Rumble manga series
- Noriko Kido, character in the Barom-1 tokusatsu series
- Shinji Kido, main character in the Kamen Rider Ryuki tokusatsu series
- Saori Kido, a main character in Saint Seiya.
- Tatsuhiko Kido, male protagonist of the manga Nozoki Ana
- Tsubomi Kido, female character from Kagerou Project
- Takeshi Kido, Chief Inspector of Kempeitai in TV series The Man in the High Castle
- Yuuto Kido, male protagonist of the anime Inazuma Eleven
