= Jørgen Watne Frydnes =

Norwegian political scientist (born 1984)

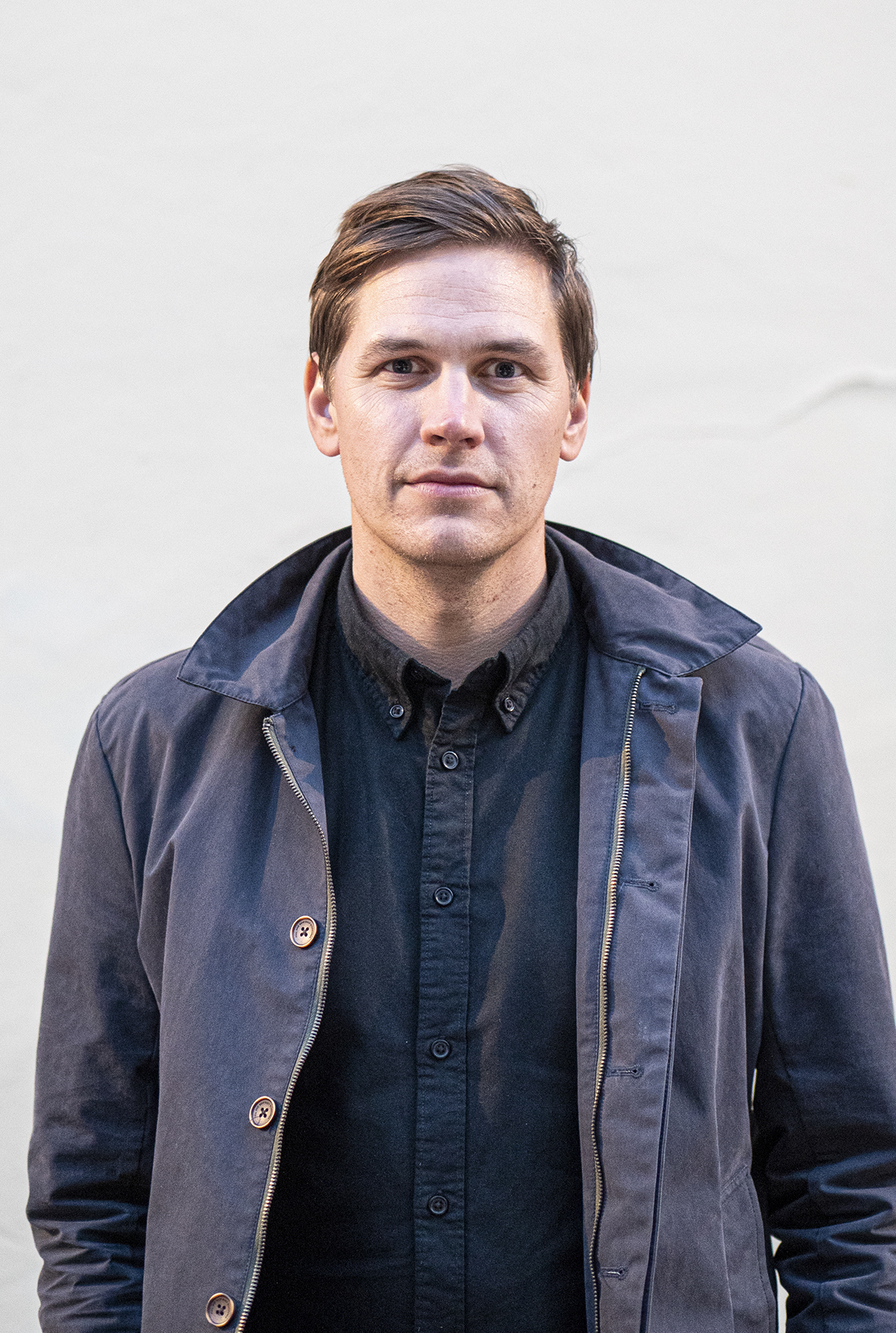
- Born: 26 November 1984 (age 41); Bergen, Norway
- Education: University of Oslo; University of York
- Occupation: Political scientist
- Awards: Fritt Ord Honorary Award (2021)

Jørgen Watne Frydnes (born 26 November 1984) is a Norwegian political figure. He is the current Chair of the Norwegian Nobel Committee, which awards the Nobel Peace Prize and serves as Secretary General of PEN Norway, the Norwegian branch of PEN International.

Frydnes is known for his role in rebuilding Utøya after the 2011 terror attacks in Norway, and for his public work on freedom of expression, memory, democracy and culture. He became the youngest chair of the Norwegian Nobel Committee in 2024. He has awarded the peace prize to Nihon Hidankyo (Japan Confederation of A- and H-Bomb Sufferers Organizations) for their tireless work as survivors of the Hiroshima and Nagasaki bombings to eliminate nuclear weapons and ensure they are never used again. He announced the 2025 peace award to Maria Corina Machado, "for her tireless work promoting democratic rights for the people of Venezuela".

== Early life and education ==
Frydnes was born in Norway in 1984. He studied political science at the University of Oslo and earned a master's degree in international politics from the University of York in the United Kingdom. He has publicly stated that he has never been politically active in a party nor held elected political office.

== NGO and humanitarian work ==
From 2004 to 2011, Frydnes worked with Médecins Sans Frontières (Doctors Without Borders). He later served on the board of its Norwegian section from 2014 to 2017. He will also remain a board member of the Norwegian Helsinki Committee from 2025 to 2028. In addition, he served as the council's leader at the Arkivet Peace and Human Rights Centre in Kristiansand.

== Criticism ==
In October 2024, the accounting firm PwC released an investigation report concerning Utøya AS covering the period when Frydnes served as managing director. The report raised questions about possible violations of the Norwegian Limited Liability Companies Act (Aksjeloven) related to the translation and publication of Frydnes's book No Man Is an Island while he was still employed by the company.

The report alleged that Utøya AS had covered costs related to the English-language translation of the book, and that a number of copies had been purchased by the organization. These transactions were questioned in connection with company procurement procedures and conflict-of-interest policies. The report further stated that disagreements emerged after Frydnes's departure in 2023 regarding responsibility for the expenses.

Frydnes, through his lawyer Reiss-Andersen, rejected the allegations, describing them as unfounded and defamatory. Reiss-Andersen stated that the purchase of the books had not been initiated by Frydnes, but by the company's marketing department and other staff members, and that Frydnes had acted solely in the capacity of an author with a publishing contract. She also criticized the investigation as one-sided, arguing that it relied primarily on the complainant's account rather than an independent assessment, and denied that Frydnes had any personal involvement in the company's financial administration. The Utøya later decided not to pursue financial claims against Frydnes related to the book translation. Some Norwegian media outlets described the dispute as contentious and politically charged. Frydnes has maintained that the accusations were timed shortly after the 2024 Nobel Peace Prize announcement and disputed any suggestion of personal gain.

== Utøya ==
Following the terrorist attack of 22 July 2011, Frydnes assumed the role of Chief Executive Officer of Utøya AS, the company responsible for managing the island where 69 lives were lost. Under Frydnes, Utøya evolved into a "learning arena" for democracy, dialogue, and remembrance. The learning centre at Utøya is called Hegnhuset, which means "The House That Safeguards". At its inauguration in 2016, it was internationally recognized as one of the most important new buildings in the world. Young people from all over Norway and many other countries take part in various learning activities in Hegnhuset every year. The structure's 69 pillars, each honouring a victim, exemplify its memorial purpose. As noted by Aftenposten, Hegnhuset was nominated for the EU's Mies van der Rohe contemporary architecture prize, while The Guardian deemed it "one of the ten most important buildings in the world". For his work at Utøya, Frydnes and the island received the Freedom of Expression Foundation's Tribute (Fritt Ord's Honnør) in 2021. In 2025, reflecting on a decade of leadership at Utøya, he published No Man Is an Island: Community and Commemoration on Norway's Utøya, a book exploring the balance between memory, trauma, and democratic practice.

== PEN Norway ==
In 2023, Frydnes was appointed Secretary General of PEN Norway, the Norwegian branch of the PEN International, which defends freedom of expression and supports writers at risk.

== Norwegian Nobel Committee ==
In 2021, Frydnes was appointed to the Norwegian Nobel Committee, which awards the Nobel Peace Prize. In 2024, he was elected Chair, becoming the youngest person to hold that office in the Committee's history. As Chair, he announced the 2024 Nobel Peace Prize to Nihon Hidankyo, the Japanese confederation of atomic bomb survivors (hibakusha). In his presentation speech, Frydnes emphasized the role of memory in preventing future atrocities and framed his generational responsibility as belonging to a post–Cold War cohort without direct war experience.

== Reception of No Man Is an Island ==
His book No Man Is an Island has been well received across public, cultural, and academic circles. The University of Massachusetts Press described the book as "a revelatory guide to rebuilding, renewing, and remembering in the face of catastrophic, unprecedented terror". In Norwegian literary media, Bok365 reviewed the book as “cautious but not toothless” (Varsom, men ikke tannløs), praising its empathetic treatment of difficult subjects. Stavanger Aftenblad described Utøya as "the island that survived" (Øya som overlevde), commending Frydnes's leadership in reclaiming the island as a democratic space. The Fritt Ord Foundation highlighted the Utøya model as a pioneering approach to turning a site of terror into an active arena for dialogue and civic engagement. The book has also been listed in academic indexes such as JSTOR, indicating scholarly interest in memory studies and commemoration research.

== Public positions ==
Frydnes has frequently spoken on themes of dialogue, tolerance, and memory politics. In a 2020 keynote, he argued that "being tolerant is and should be hard", stressing the importance of active listening across disagreement.

== Recognition ==
Freedom of Expression Foundation Tribute (Fritt Ord's Honnør), awarded jointly to Utøya and Frydnes in 2021.

== Publications ==
- No Man Is an Island: Community and Commemoration on Norway's Utøya (University of Massachusetts Press / UBC Press, 2025)
