= 2024 Nobel Prizes =

The 2024 Nobel Prizes were awarded by the Nobel Foundation, based in Sweden. Six categories were awarded: Physics, Chemistry, Physiology or Medicine, Literature, Peace, and Economic Sciences. The winners in each category were announced from October 7 to October 14.

Nobel Week was scheduled to take place from December 6 to 12, including programming such as lectures, dialogues, and discussions. The award ceremony and banquet for the Peace Prize were scheduled in Oslo on December 10, while the award ceremony and banquet for all other categories were scheduled for the same day in Stockholm.

== Prizes ==
=== Physics ===
Awardee(s)
John Hopfield (b. 1933)	American	"for foundational discoveries and inventions that enable machine learning with artificial neural networks"
Geoffrey Hinton (b. 1947)	British Canadian	"for foundational discoveries and inventions that enable machine learning with artificial neural networks"

=== Chemistry ===
Awardee(s)
David Baker (b. 1962)	American	"for computational protein design"
Demis Hassabis (b. 1976)	British	“for protein structure prediction”
John M. Jumper (b. 1985)	American	“for protein structure prediction”

=== Physiology or Medicine ===
Awardee(s)
Victor Ambros (b. 1953)	United States	"for the discovery of microRNA and its role in post-transcriptional gene regulation"
Gary Ruvkun (b. 1952)	United States	"for the discovery of microRNA and its role in post-transcriptional gene regulation"

=== Literature ===
Awardee(s)
Han Kang (b. 1970)	South Korea	"for her intense poetic prose that confronts historical traumas and exposes the fragility of human life"

=== Peace ===
Awardee(s)
Nihon Hidankyo (founded 1956)	Japan	"for its efforts to achieve a world free of nuclear weapons and for demonstrating through witness testimony that nuclear weapons must never be used again"

=== Economic Sciences ===
Awardee(s)
Daron Acemoglu (b. 1967)	Turkey United States	"for studies of how institutions are formed and affect prosperity"
Simon Johnson (b. 1963)	United Kingdom United States	"for studies of how institutions are formed and affect prosperity"
James A. Robinson (b. 1955)	United Kingdom United States	"for studies of how institutions are formed and affect prosperity"

== Other events ==
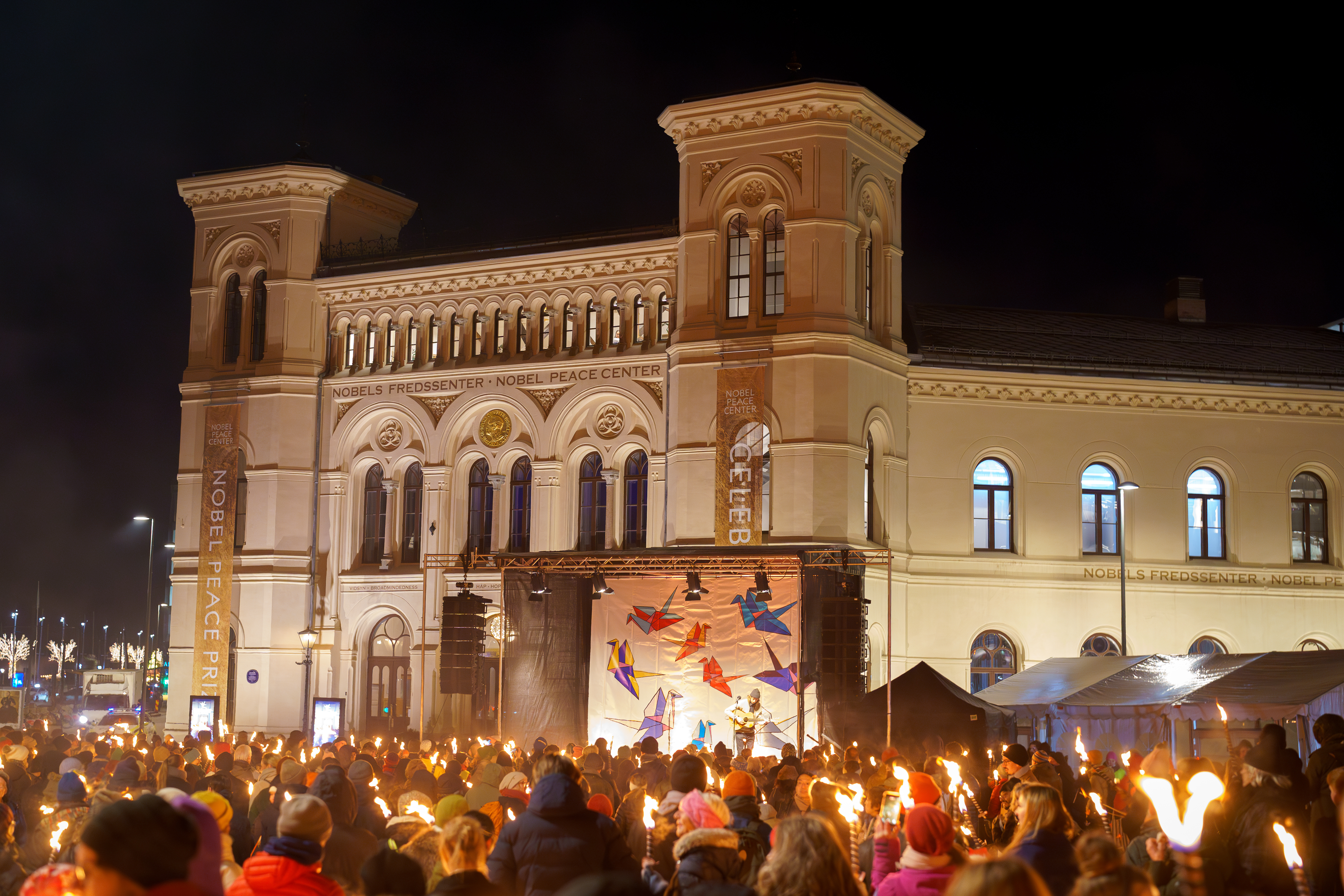
Nobel Peace Prize torchlight procession in Oslo, Norway

From November 30 to December 8, the Nobel Prize Museum set up citywide illuminations across Oslo. On December 8, as well, opera singer Malin Byström and conductor Petr Popelka performed at the Nobel Prize Concert. The menu for the Nobel Banquet, scheduled for December 10, was set by chef Jessie Sommarström and pastry chef Frida Bäcke.

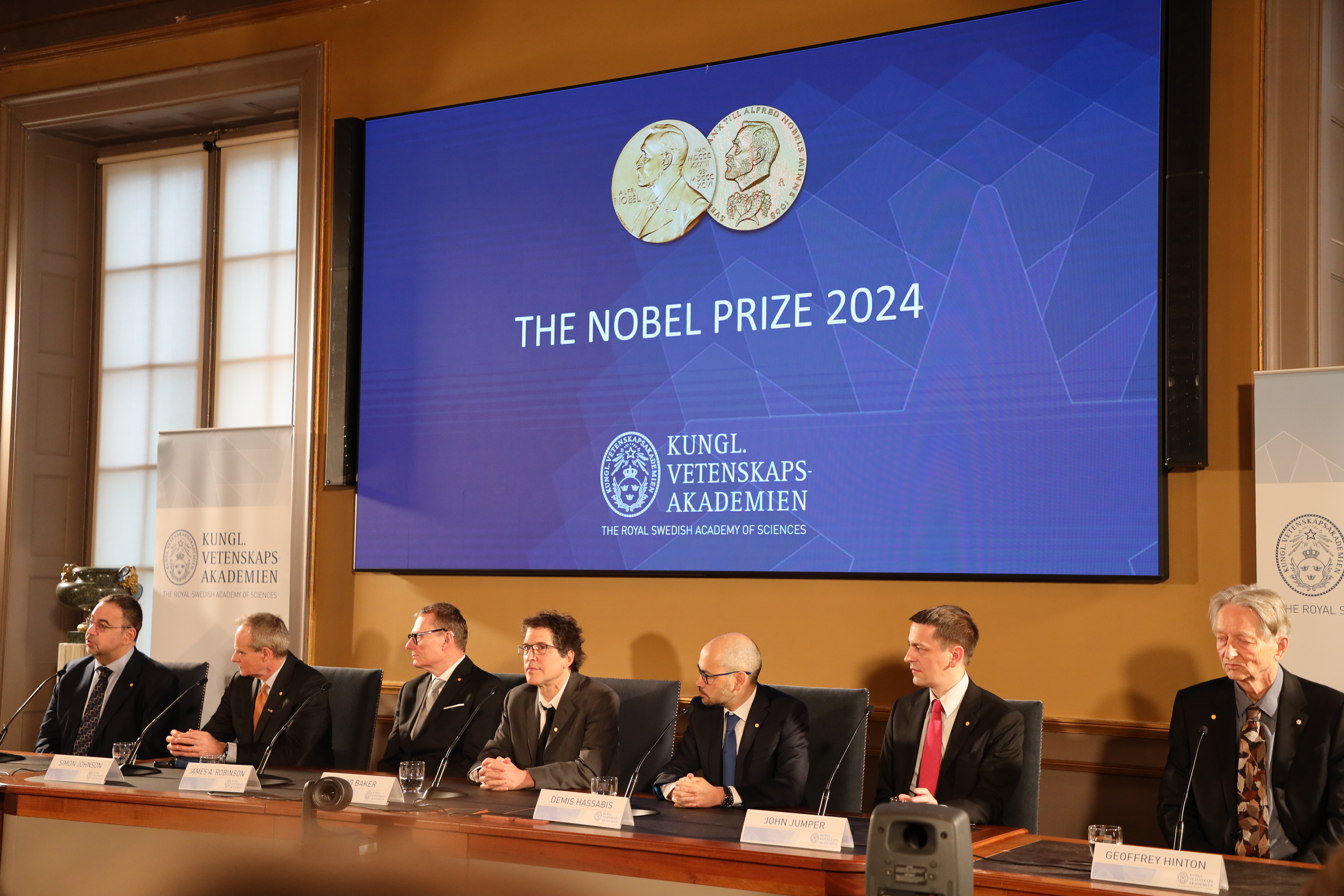
Economic Sciences, Chemistry, and Physics laureates at a press conference at Royal Swedish Academy of Sciences

== Controversies ==
=== Physiology or Medicine ===
Multiple media outlets, after the official announcement, noted the potential snub of Ambros' wife Rosalind Lee who was cited in the key publications highlighted by the Nobel Committee and was known to have contributed significantly in the development of the research of her husband, adding further to the continuous debate whether women are given the rightful acknowledgements they deserve in the field of science. Victor Ambros expressed, “It would have been terrific if we could have shared” the prize. She would have been the latest female Nobel laureate after Katalin Karikó.

=== Physics ===
Hinton's awarding of the Prize in Physics, for research on machine learning, provoked debates about the lack of recognition for computation and mathematics in the Nobel Foundation's categories. Some saw Hinton's work as crucial but not traditionally in line with physics.

=== Economic Sciences ===
The Atlantic called the Prize in Economic Sciences in 2024 to be one of the most controversial in recent history. Acemoglu, Johnson, and Robinson's work was criticized by historians and social scientists for inaccurately describing and analyzing history, neglecting the role of colonization in nation-building, and reflecting the insularity of economics as a discipline, among other critiques.
