= Terumi Tanaka =

Survivor of the atomic bombing of Nagasaki

- 田中 煕巳
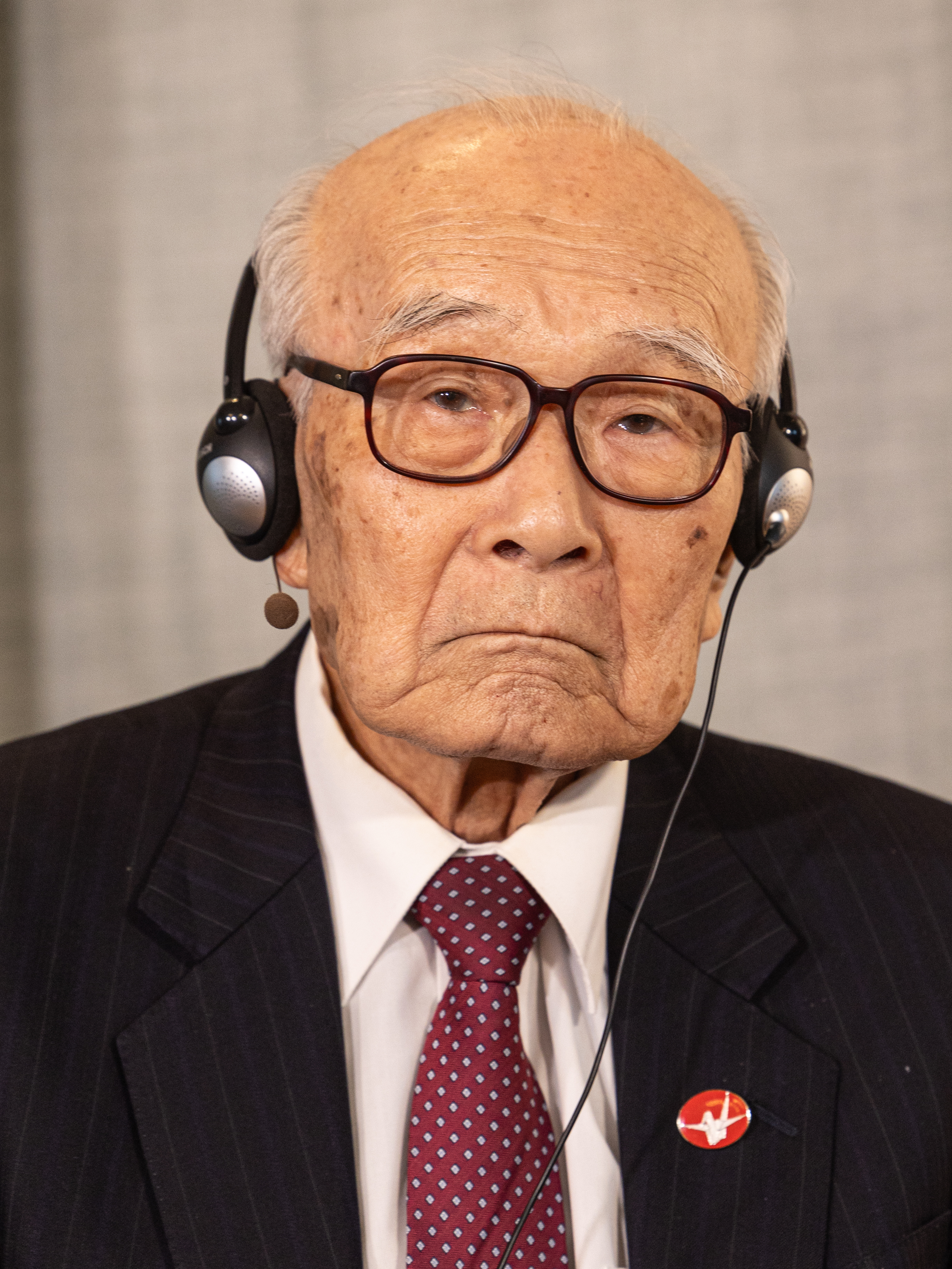
- Tanaka at 2024 Nobel Week
- Born: 29 April 1932 (age 94); Manchukuo
- Education: Tokyo University of Science
- Organization: Nihon Hidankyo

Terumi Tanaka (田中 煕巳, Tanaka Terumi; born 29 April 1932) is a Japanese anti-nuclear and anti-war activist and former professor. He is a hibakusha, a survivor of the atomic bombing of Nagasaki, and is the secretary general of Nihon Hidankyo, a Japan-wide organisation of atomic and hydrogen bomb sufferers. He lives in Niiza, Saitama. On October 11, 2024, the Japan Confederation of A- and H-Bomb Sufferers Organizations (Nihon Hidankyo), which he represents, was awarded the Nobel Peace Prize.

== Early life ==
He was born on 29 April 1932 in Manchuria in China, which was then under Japanese occupation as the puppet state of Manchukuo. He later moved to Nagasaki.

== Atomic bombing of Nagasaki ==
Tanaka was 13 years old when Nagasaki was bombed, and his home was around 3.2 kilometres from the hypocenter. He was blown through several panes of glass but did not suffer major injuries. He lost his grandfather, two uncles, an aunt, and a cousin in the bombing. He personally cremated his aunt in a nearby field after she died several days after the bombing.

== Postwar career ==
He was an associate professor in the school of engineering at Tohoku University.

== Activism ==
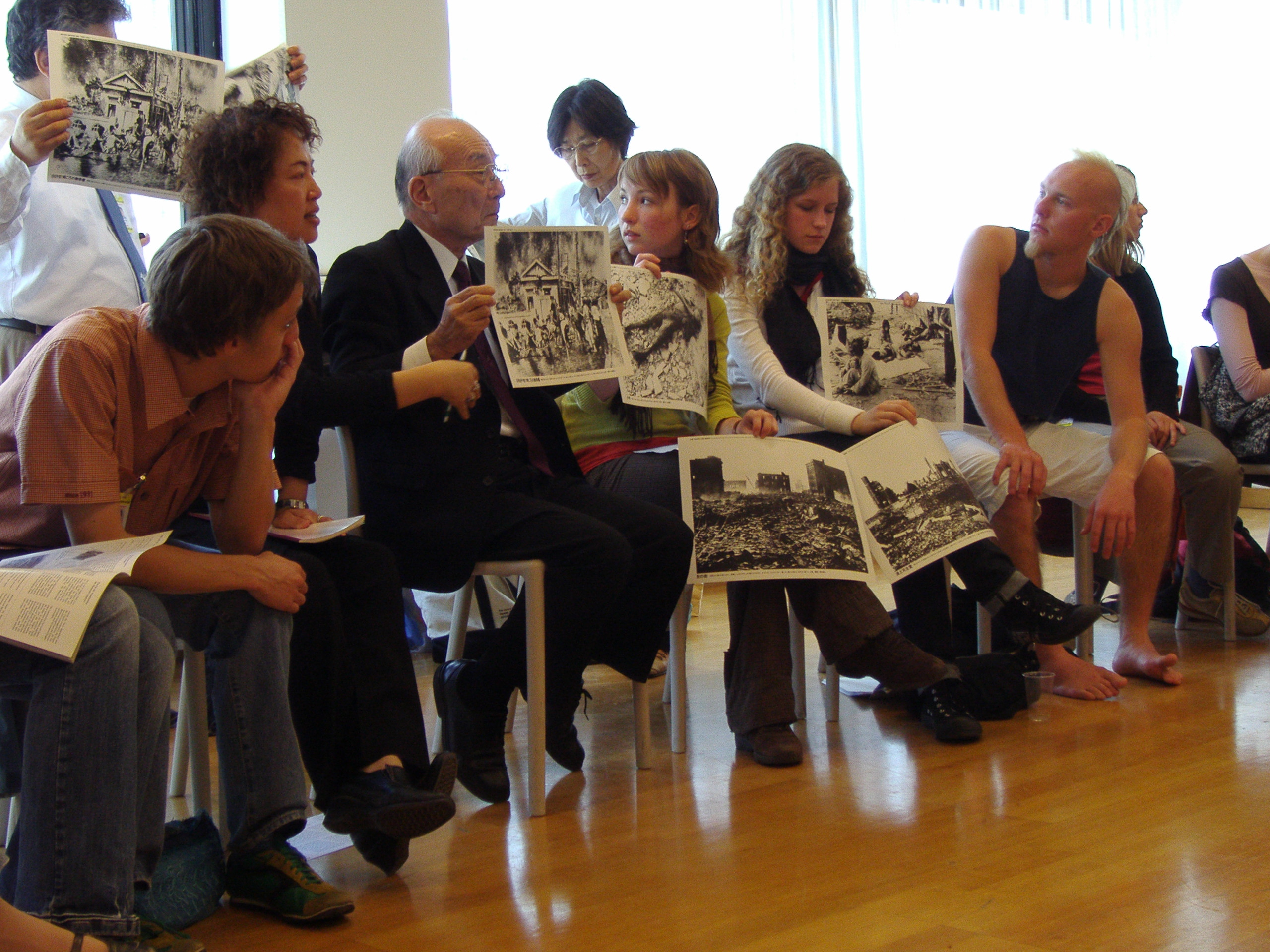
Terumi Tanaka, hibakusha of Nagasaki, tells young people about his experience and shows pictures. United Nations's International Atomic Energy Agency building in Vienna, during the NPT PrepCom 2007.

Tanaka has been involved with hibakusha activism since 1974, and he became secretary-general of the Japan Confederation of A- and H-Bomb Sufferers Organizations in 2000.

Tanaka has called upon the U.S. to offer an apology for the atomic bombings of Hiroshima and Nagasaki. He advocates for nuclear disarmament and holds that the use of nuclear weapons is never justified. He has also condemned North Korean nuclear tests.

He has also spoken out against discrimination against atomic bomb survivors and their descendants.

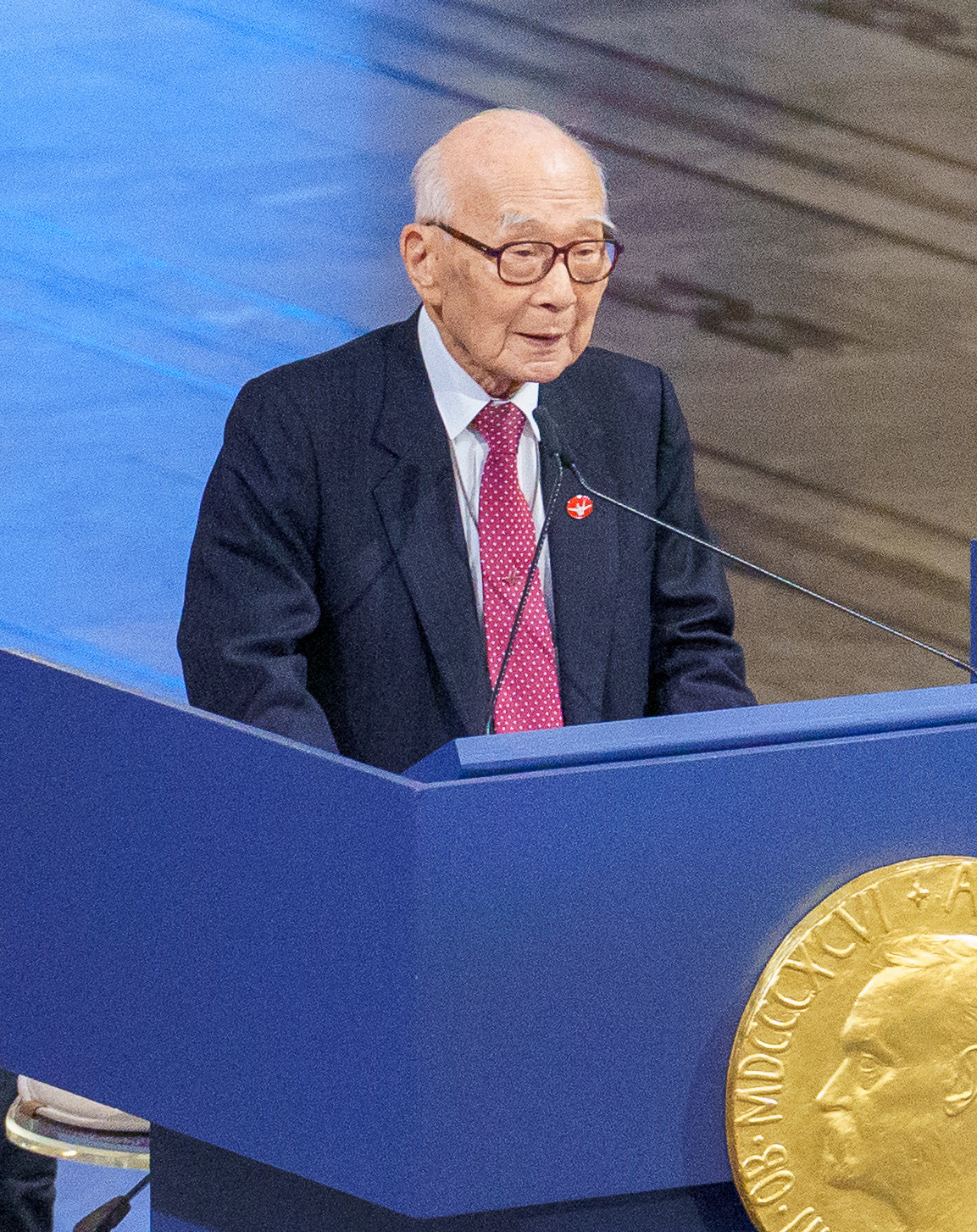
Tanaka speaking at the 2024 Nobel Peace Prize Ceremony in Oslo, Norway

After the 2011 Fukushima Daiichi nuclear disaster, Tanaka and Hidankyo called for the decommissioning of reactors that had already been shut down.

Along with other atomic bomb survivors Tanaka attended the May 2016 speech of US President Barack Obama in Hiroshima, responding positively and praising it as being "wonderful", although he regretted that Obama had not been able to make progress towards a nuclear free world. After reading a translation of the speech and fully understanding the contents, he regretted praising the speech, stating that Obama's abstract language such as "Death fell from the sky" was unacceptable, given the bombing was a deliberate act by the US.

In January 2017 he announced that he would retire in June at the Nikon Hidankyo General Meeting.

== See also ==
- Nuclear disarmament
- List of peace activists
