= Sueichi Kido =

Activist and general secretary of Nihon Hidankyo

Sueichi Kido (木戸 季市; born 1940) is a Japanese professor emeritus and survivor of the atomic bombing of Nagasaki. He has been the secretary general of Nihon Hidankyo (Japan Confederation of A- and H-Bomb Sufferers Organizations) since 2017.

== Life ==
Kido was born in 1940, in Nagasaki. He was five years old when he was exposed to the atomic bombing of Nagasaki. His house was 2 kilometers from the epicenter of the blast, where he suffered facial burns and was saved from the severe effects of the explosion by his mother, who was more severely injured. He completed his postgraduate studies at Doshisha University, and worked at a college in Gifu, and is now a professor emeritus.

Since 1991, he has been a supporter of the hibakusha movement. Since 2017, he has been the secretary general of Nihon Hidankyo.
