= Jessie Sommarström =

Swedish chef and sustainability advocate

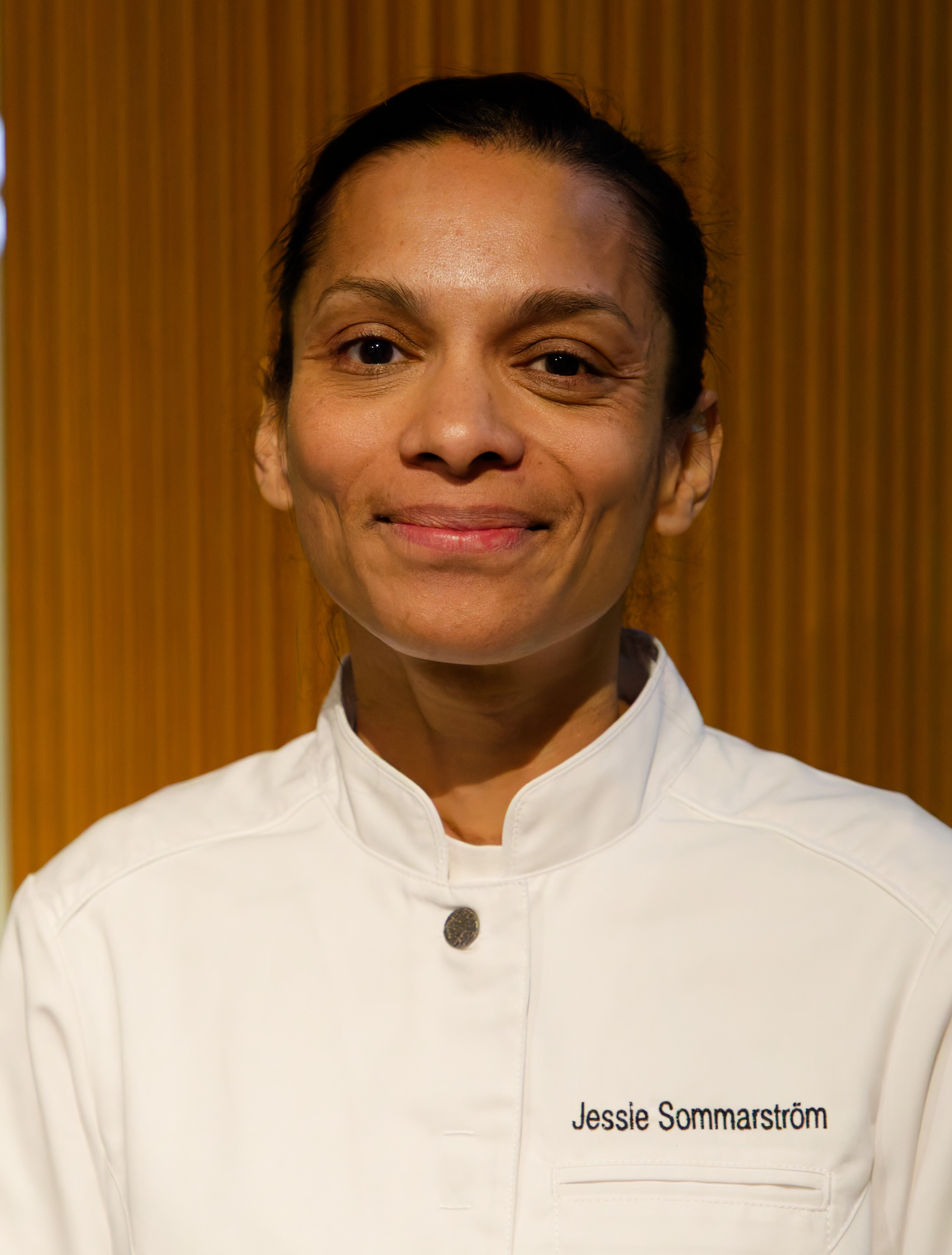
- Sommarström in 2024
- Born: May 1, 1979 (age 46)
- Citizenship: Sweden
- Occupations: Chef, sustainability advocate
- Spouse: Gordon Grimlund
- Awards: Chef of the Year Chef's Chef Gastronomy Academy Gold Medal Woman of the Year in Tourism Industry

Jessie Sommarström (born May 1, 1979) is a Swedish chef and sustainability advocate. In 2022, she was named Chef of the Year. In 2023, she earned a Gastronomic Academy Gold Medal and was named Woman of the Year in the Tourism Industry as well as Restaurangvärlden's Chef's Chef. She has worked on food sustainability with various initiatives including Urban Deli and the Axfoundation.

== Early life ==
Sommarström was adopted from India and grew up in Sweden. She was raised by a single mother and primarily ate vegetarian food; her love and curiosity for food developed during her teenage years. After high school, she began working as a dishwasher in restaurants and occasionally helped out with culinary duties.

== Career ==
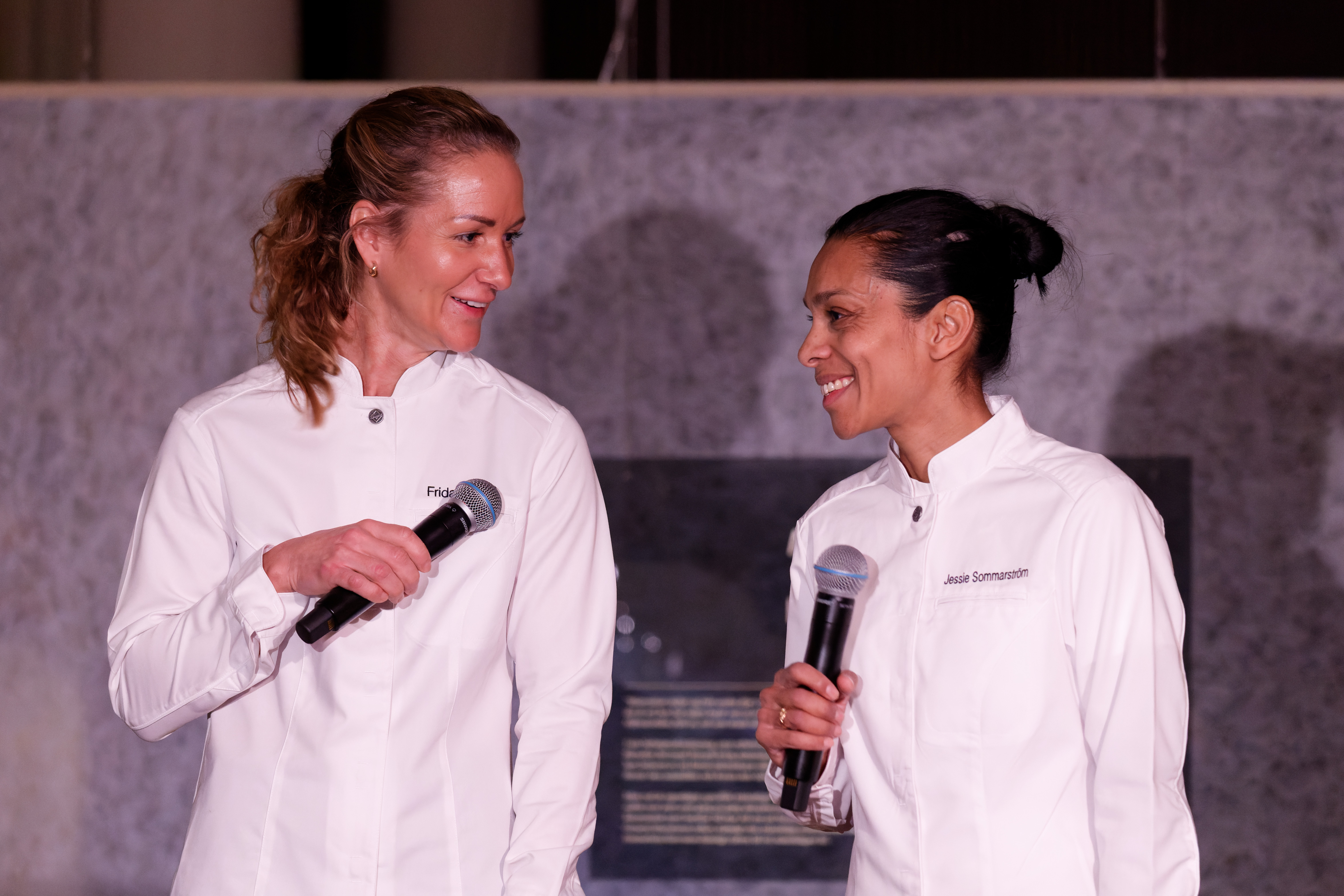
Sommarström with Frida Bäcke at 2024 Nobel Week

Sommarström has worked in Sturehof, Esperanto, and other restaurants. In 2021, she participated in the reality television cooking show Kockarnas Kamp. The same year, she became an ambassador for the Children's Fund. In 2024, she prepared the Nobel Prize banquet menu for the first time alongside chef Frida Bäcke. She is also a partner with Gastroagentur, a Swedish agency partnering culinary profiles with companies.

In 2022, Sommarström pivoted from restaurant business to the public sector, specifically on issues of food sustainability and climate change. Toward these efforts, Sommarström has been a creative leader for Urban Deli, a sustainable food enterprise where she's worked on more sustainable, circular ways of raising, preparing, and cooking fish; and has worked on "the food of the future" with the Axfoundation, a sustainability organization. In 2023, Sommarström developed the Swedish Dish of the Year, a meatball dish made of 50% meatballs and 50% mince legume with tomato sauce and pasta. She has stated that the dish's sustainability and accessibility was rooted in her childhood. The concept also inspired her legume-based mince, first developed at the Axfoundation, which was later handed off to Svenska Färsodlarna for further development and debuted in IKEA restaurants all across Sweden starting in 2024.

As part of being crowned Chef of the Year in 2022, Sommarström's face was printed on bottles of Melleruds' Mästarpilsner. She is the second woman in history to win the award since Kristina Petterson in 1988.

== Personal life ==
Sommarström has two sons: Theo and Julius. Her husband, Gordon Grimlund, is also a chef. Together, she and her family live on the Stockholm Archipelago.
