= Sunao Tsuboi =

Japanese activist and teacher (1925–2021)

- 坪井 直
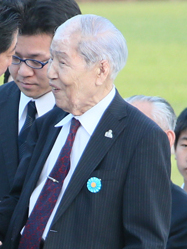
- Born: May 5, 1925; Ondo, Hiroshima, Japan
- Died: October 24, 2021 (aged 96); Hiroshima, Japan
- Organization: Nihon Hidankyo

Sunao Tsuboi (坪井 直, Tsuboi Sunao; May 5, 1925 – October 24, 2021) was a Japanese anti-nuclear, anti-war activist, and teacher. He was a hibakusha, a survivor of the atomic bombing of Hiroshima, and was the co-chair of Nihon Hidankyo, a Japan-wide organisation of atomic and hydrogen bomb sufferers. He was awarded the Kiyoshi Tanimoto peace prize in 2011.

== Early life ==
Born and raised in Hiroshima Prefecture, Tsuboi was interested since childhood in mathematics and science and wished to be an inventor. He was the fourth of five brothers. His two eldest brothers went to war in China and did not return.

== Atomic bombing of Hiroshima ==
In 1945, he was a student of the Hiroshima City Technical School (present-day, the Hiroshima University School of Engineering). On the morning of August 6, he had just eaten breakfast at a dining hall named "Shima no Kaori" and was invited to have a second breakfast with other students. He declined as he was concerned that the young woman behind the counter would consider him a glutton. When the bomb exploded soon afterwards, he was walking to school and he became badly burned. Everyone in the dining hall was killed.

The school was abandoned and catching fire, and he went to an aunt's house nearby. He was in shock and belatedly realized that he was badly injured; he did not wish to be a burden to her, so he left. He went to the Miyuki Bridge, where he heard that there was an aid station. However, the only assistance he could find there was policemen pouring cooking oil onto the skin of school children to ease the pain from burns.

He was later taken to Ujina (Hiroshima port) by a truck and then to Ninoshima by barge. Only young men were being evacuated, as they were considered valuable for the war effort. He asked a woman visiting to inform his family. He stayed on Ninoshima for several days, cared for by a classmate who fed him; this classmate was then sent elsewhere. His mother and uncle searched among the dead and dying for three days with no success. When her uncle suggested leaving and holding a funeral for him, his mother began running around screaming his name. He heard her and put up his hand and said, "Here I am." He was then taken to his home in Ando, but was not conscious of this. When his aunt first saw him, she said he looked like a ghost. He did not know the war had ended and did not believe that it had when he was told.

== Postwar medical treatment ==
Tsuboi was cared for by his family after the war and developed aplastic anaemia. He received several blood transfusions and was hospitalized eleven times. Three times his condition became so bad that he was told he was about to die. He suffered from several illnesses later including two cancer diagnoses. He received intravenous transfusions for anemia every two weeks.

== Postwar career ==
Tsuboi became a teacher as the hours were not so demanding and teachers received a lot of days off. He taught mathematics at a women's college and at other schools including Ondo-Cho Junior High School. Close to August 6 he would tell his story to his students. He was known as "Pika-don Sensei" or "Mr Flash-Bang", referring to the atomic bombing. He became the principal of a Junior High School, and retired in 1986 after serving as the principal of the Kamezaki and Jonan Junior High Schools.

== Activism ==
After retirement from teaching, Sunao Tsuboi became more involved in anti-nuclear and anti-war activism, participating in sit-ins, demonstrations and rallies. He travelled across Japan and abroad in his many campaigns and repeatedly stated that he wanted nuclear weapons to be abolished. He became the co-chair of Nihon Hidankyo, a Japan-wide organisation of atomic and hydrogen bomb sufferers, in 2000. In 2011, he was awarded the Kiyoshi Tanimoto peace prize for his efforts in activism. He made many speeches to students on school excursions to Hiroshima, foreign visitors, and many others over the years, and met with Barack Obama, the first sitting US president to visit Hiroshima, in May 2016. In recognition for his work campaigning for the abolition of nuclear weapons and support for other hibakusha, he was named an honorary resident of Hiroshima in 2018.

He had criticised Japanese Prime Minister Shinzō Abe for attacking Japan's postwar commitment to pacifism. In 2015 he and other atomic bomb survivors asked Abe to drop the unpopular Legislation for Peace and Security then being passed by Abe's administration.

== Personal life ==
When he was 26 years old and teaching at a college for women, Tsuboi met his future wife, Suzuko. Her parents objected to the marriage as they were concerned that, as an atomic bomb survivor, he would soon die and leave her a widow. They attempted to commit suicide together using sleeping pills, but failed because they had not taken a sufficient dosage.

On October 24, 2021, Tsuboi died of arrhythmia due to anemia in Hiroshima at the age of 96. He was survived by a son and two daughters.
