= Nihon Hidankyo =

Japanese organization

Nihon Hidankyō
- Japan Confederation of A- and H-Bomb Sufferers Organizations
- Founded: 10 August 1956; 70 years ago
- Purpose: Abolition of nuclear weapons
- Headquarters: Shibadaimon, Minato, Tokyo
- Region served: Japan
- Method: Lobbying
- Executive director: Sueichi Kido
- Award: 2024 Nobel Peace Prize
- Website: nihon-hidankyo.org

The Japan Confederation of A- and H-Bomb Sufferers Organizations, (Note: Japanese: 日本原水爆被害者団体協議会, Hepburn: Nihon Gensuibaku Higaisha Dantai Kyōgi-kai) often shortened to Nihon Hidankyō (日本被団協, Nihon Hidankyō), is a group that represents survivors (known as hibakusha) of the atomic bombings of Hiroshima and Nagasaki. It was formed in 1956.

Nihon Hidankyō lobbies both the Japanese government for improved support of the victims and governments worldwide for the abolition of nuclear weapons. Their activities included recording thousands of witness accounts, issuing resolutions and public appeals, and sending annual delegations to various international organisations, including the United Nations, to advocate for global nuclear disarmament.

The organisation was awarded the 2024 Nobel Peace Prize "for its efforts to achieve a world free of nuclear weapons and for demonstrating through witness testimony that nuclear weapons must never be used again".

== History ==
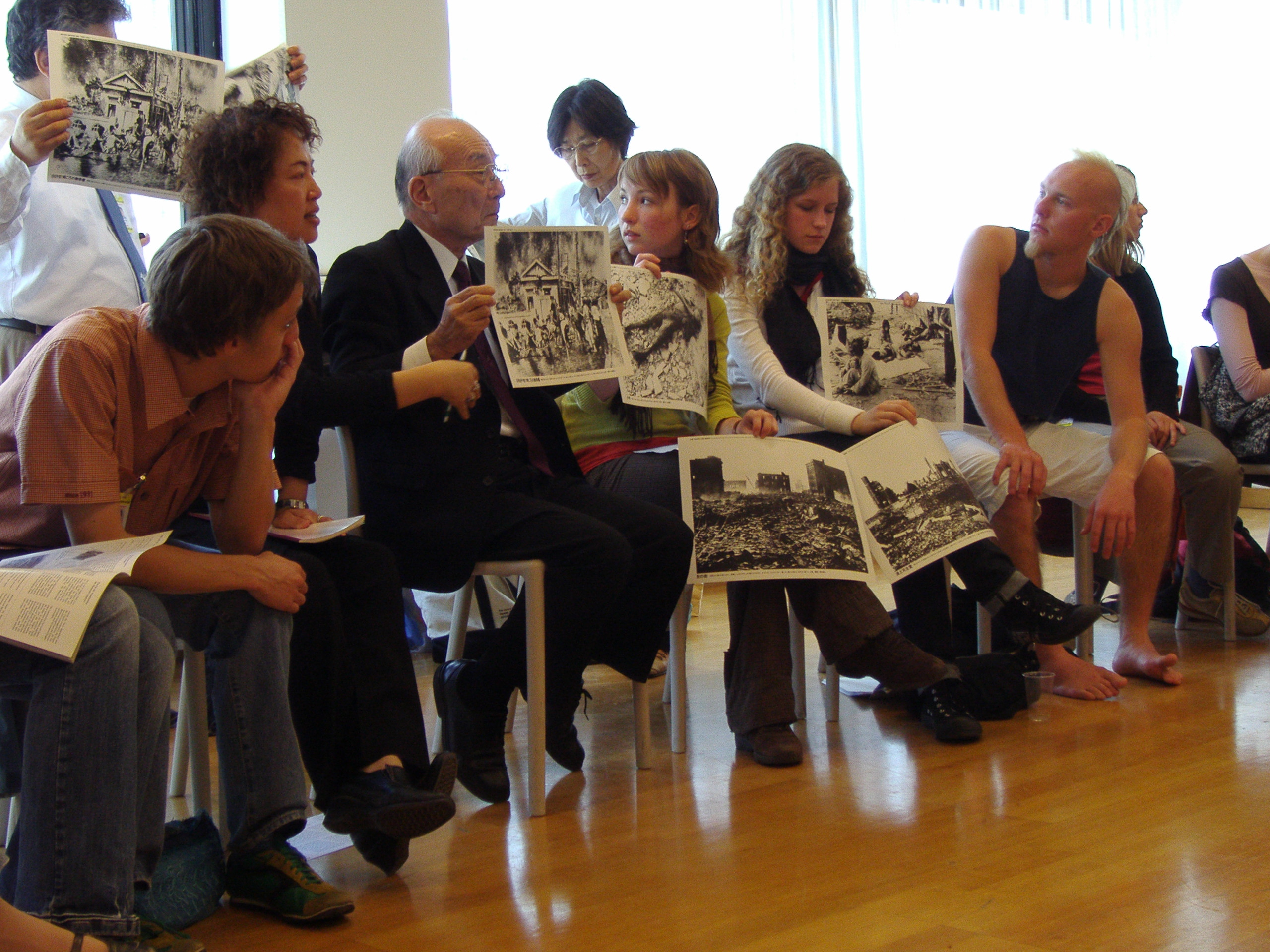
Nihon Hidankyo's secretary general Terumi Tanaka speaking to youth about surviving the atomic bombing of Nagasaki at a UN event in Vienna in 2007

Nihon Hidankyo is a nation-wide organisation formed by survivor groups of atomic bomb victims from Hiroshima and Nagasaki in each prefecture. The fallout from Castle Bravo, a thermonuclear weapon test conducted at Bikini Atoll by the United States in 1954, caused acute radiation syndrome in residents of neighbouring atolls and 23 crew members of the Japanese fishing vessel Daigo Fukuryū Maru. This led to the formation of the Japan Council against Atomic and Hydrogen Bombs in Hiroshima the following year. Inspired and supported by this movement, atomic bomb survivors established Nihon Hidankyo on 10 August 1956, at the second annual conference of the council in Nagasaki.

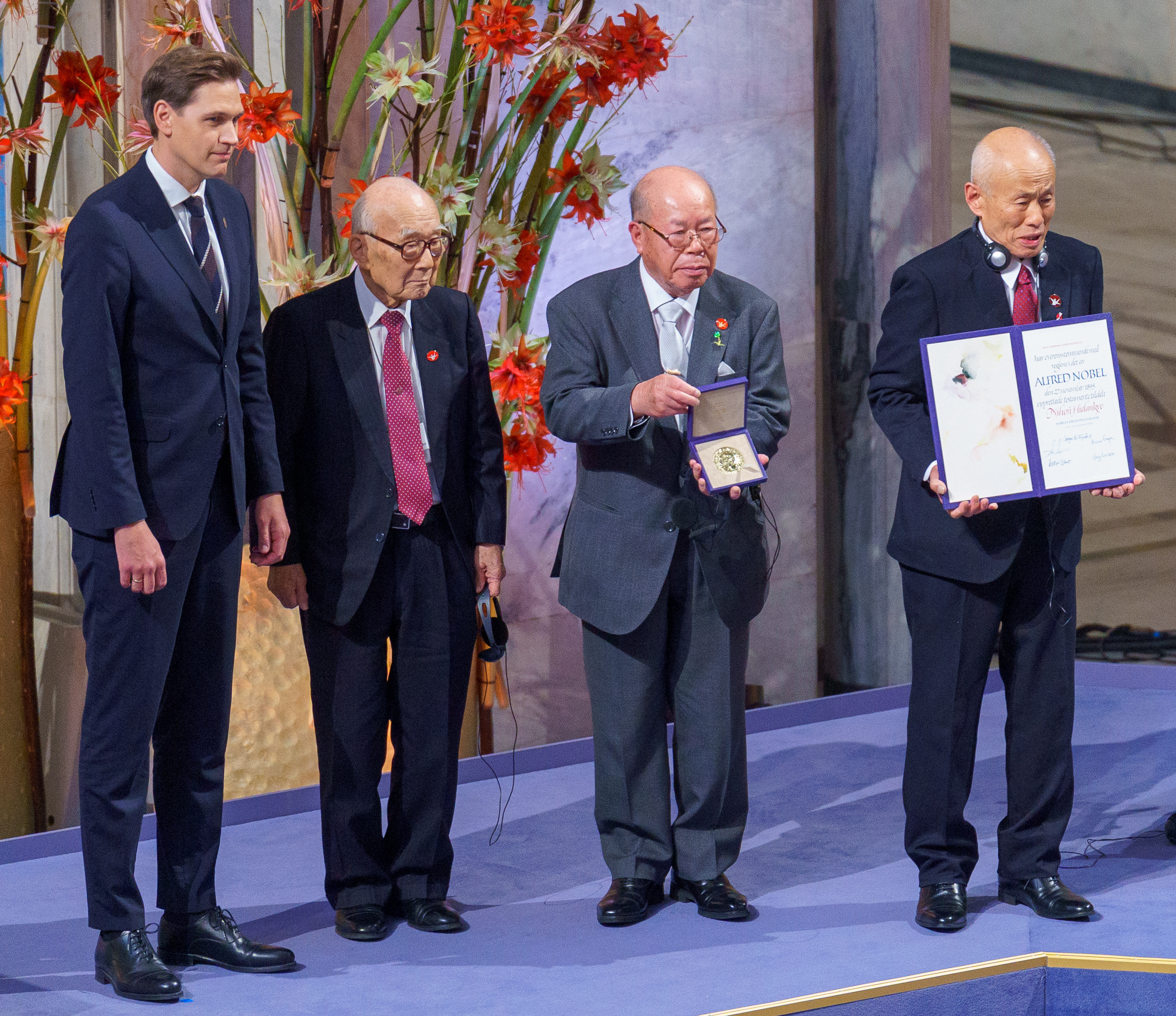
Terumi Tanaka, Shigemitsu Tanaka, and Toshiyuki Mimaki at the 2024 Nobel Peace Prize Ceremony with Jørgen Watne Frydnes

However, the movement's solidarity was jeopardised when the council became actively involved in the anti-U.S.-Japan Security Treaty movement alongside the left-leaning Japan Socialist Party in 1959. A large number of supporters withdrew from the council, and with the support of the conservative Liberal Democrats, a new organisation, led by Masatoshi Matsushita, leader of the staunchly anti-communist Democratic Socialist Party, was established. In 1961, when the Soviet Union resumed nuclear tests, the communist wing of the council refused to denounce them, which led to severe internal tension. This led to a further split in the movement, with a Japan Socialist Party-backed group that denounces nuclear tests by any nation breaking away as a new council. These tensions within anti-nuclear movements caused some prefectural Hidankyos to split at the local level as well, such as in Hiroshima, where there are both Socialist Party-backed and Communist Party-backed Hidankyos with the same name. The nationwide organisation itself decided not to align with any political movements in 1965, after they became highly politicised.

== Activities ==
As of October 2024, Nihon Hidankyo's activities include:

- Advocacy for the abolition of nuclear weapons and demands for state compensations
- Petitioning actions towards the Japanese government, the United Nations and other governments
- Elimination and removal of nuclear weapons, establishment of an international treaty for nuclear disarmament, holding of international conferences, enactment of non-nuclear laws and enhancement of hibakusha support measures
- Raising awareness of the realities of the atomic bombings both domestically and internationally
- Research, study, publication, exhibitions and gatherings on atomic bomb damage
- Consultation and support activities for hibakusha

== Key figures ==
=== Current officials ===
==== Co-chairs ====
- Terumi Tanaka: Exposed to radiation 3.2 km away from the Nagasaki hypocentre at the age of 13; assumed office on 14 June 2017
- Shigemitsu Tanaka: Exposed to radiation 6 km away from the Nagasaki hypocentre at the age of 4; assumed office on 14 June 2018
- Toshiyuki Mimaki: Exposed to radiation at his home in Hiroshima at the age of 3; assumed office on 9 June 2022

==== Secretary general ====
- Sueichi Kido: Exposed to radiation in Nagasaki at the age of 5; assumed office on 7 June 2017

==== Assistant secretaries general ====
- Toshiko Hamanaka
- Jiro Hamasumi
- Michiko Kodama
- Masako Wada

=== Former officials ===
- Ichiro Moritaki: Founding chairperson of Nihon Hidankyo. Founding chairperson of the Hiroshima Prefectural Hidankyo, a committee head of the Atomic Water Association, and the third chairperson of the Japan National Conference on the Prohibition of Atomic and Hydrogen Bombs. Died January 25, 1994.
- Sumiteru Taniguchi: Severely injured by the Nagasaki bomb 1.8 km away from the hypocentre at the age of 16; co-chairperson until his death on 20 August 2017
- Takeshi Ito: Born in Hiroshima City. Ito was exposed to the atomic bomb during his third year at the former Hiroshima Prefectural First Middle School; co-chairperson until his death on 3 March 2000.
- Sunao Tsuboi: Severely injured by the Hiroshima bomb 1.5 km away from the hypocentre at the age of 20; co-chairperson until his death on 24 October 2021
- Mikiso Iwasa: Severely injured by the Hiroshima bomb at his home 1.2 km away from the hypocentre at the age of 16; co-chairperson until his death on 7 September 2020

== Honors ==
- 2003: Seán MacBride Peace Prize
- 2010: Award for Social Activism from the World Summit of Nobel Peace Laureates
- 2024: Nobel Peace Prize

Before being awarded the Nobel Peace Prize, Nihon Hidankyo was also nominated in 1985, 1994 and 2015 by the Swiss-based International Peace Bureau.

== See also ==
- Anti-nuclear movement
- Anti-nuclear power movement in Japan
- International Campaign to Abolish Nuclear Weapons
- Treaty on the Prohibition of Nuclear Weapons
