= 2024 Nobel Peace Prize =

Award

- Nihon Hidankyo
- "for its efforts to achieve a world free of nuclear weapons and for demonstrating through witness testimony that nuclear weapons must never be used again."
- Date: 11 October 2024 (announcement); 10 December 2024 (ceremony)
- Location: Oslo, Norway
- Presented by: Norwegian Nobel Committee
- Reward: 11.0 million SEK
- First award: 1901
- Website: Official website

The 2024 Nobel Peace Prize, an international peace prize established according to Alfred Nobel's will. It was awarded to Nihon Hidankyo (the Japan Confederation of A- and H-Bomb Sufferers Organizations) for the organization's activism against nuclear weapons, assisted by victim and survivors (known as Hibakusha) of the atomic bombings of Hiroshima and Nagasaki in 1945. Nihon Hidankyo received the prize at a ceremony on 10 December 2024 in Oslo, Norway.

== Laureate ==
The 2024 Nobel Peace Prize was awarded to Nihon Hidankyō "for its efforts to achieve a world free of nuclear weapons and for demonstrating through witness testimony that nuclear weapons must never be used again."

== Reactions ==
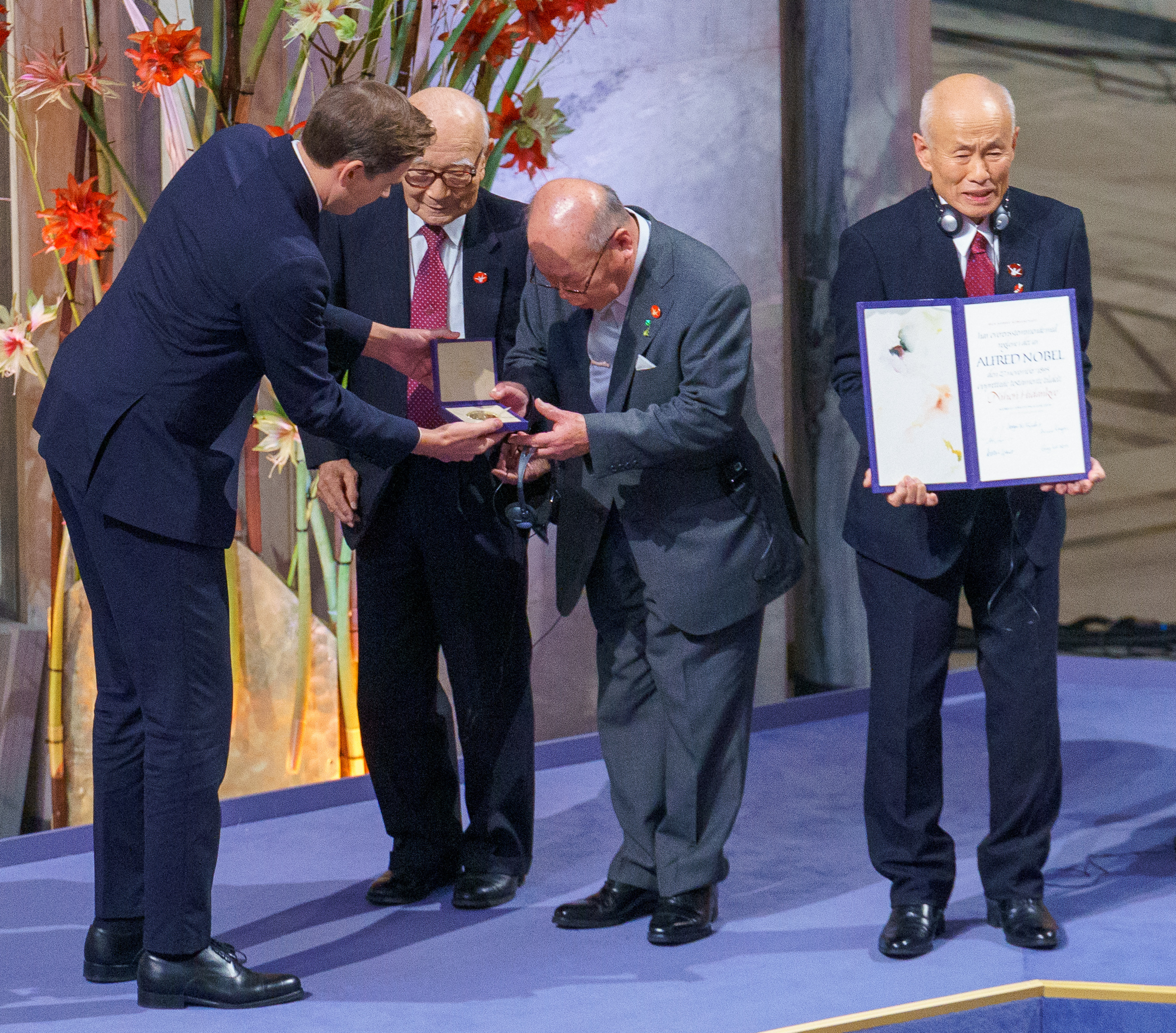
Terumi Tanaka, Shigemitsu Tanaka, and Toshiyuki Mimaki, representing Nihon Hidankyo, accepting the 2024 Nobel Peace Prize from Jørgen Watne Frydnes

Co-chair of the Nihon Hidankyo, Toshiyuki Mimaki, expressed surprise at receiving the award, telling reporters that he thought "those fighting hard for peace in Gaza would deserve it." He then warned of the danger of nuclear weapons being used for terrorism, warning that if "Russia uses them against Ukraine, Israel against Gaza, it won't end there." He compared the situation of Gaza to "Japan 80 years ago."

== Candidates ==
Though nominations are strictly kept a secret, several Norwegian parliamentarians and other academics are privileged to publicly announce their preferred candidates simply to raise publicity both for the nominee and the nominator.

=== Qualified nominators ===
According to the statutes of the Nobel Foundation, a nomination is considered valid if it is submitted by a person or a group of people within these categories:

- 1. Members of national assemblies and national governments (cabinet members/ministers) of sovereign states as well as current heads of states;
- 2. Members of The International Court of Justice and The Permanent Court of Arbitration in The Hague;
- 3. Members of Institut de Droit International;
- 4. Members of the international board of the Women's International League for Peace and Freedom;
- 5. University professors, professors emeriti and associate professors of history, social sciences, law, philosophy, theology, and religion; university rectors and university directors (or their equivalents);
- 6. Directors of peace research institutes and foreign policy institutes;
- 7. Persons who have been awarded the Nobel Peace Prize;
- 8. Members of the main board of directors or its equivalent of organizations that have been awarded the Nobel Peace Prize;
- 9. Current and former members of the Norwegian Nobel Committee (proposals by current members of the Committee to be submitted no later than at the first meeting of the Committee after 1 February);
- 10. Former advisers to the Norwegian Nobel Committee.

Nominations confirmed by various news agencies
Nominee	Country/ Headquarters	Motivations	Nominator(s)	Source
Individuals
Rolando Álvarez (born 1966)	Nicaragua	"in recognition of the defense of religious freedom in Nicaragua."	Bill Cassidy (born 1957)	
Félix Maradiaga (born 1976)	Nicaragua	"in recognition of the defense of religious freedom in Nicaragua."	Bill Cassidy (born 1957)	
José Andrés (born 1969)	Spain; United States	"for his selfless personal commitment to feeding the hungry and launching World Central Kitchen."	Nancy Pelosi (born 1940); Rosa DeLauro (born 1943); Jim McGovern (born 1959)	
Julian Assange (born 1971)	Australia	"for having exposed torture and inhumane treatment of prisoners of war, and thus contributing to peace."	Sofie Marhaug (born 1990)	
David Attenborough (born 1926)	United Kingdom		Une Bastholm (born 1986)	
Motaz Azaiza (born 1999)	Palestine	"for giving the world an insight into the atrocities in Gaza."	Ingvild Wetrhus Thorsvik (born 1991)	
Motaz Azaiza (born 1999)	Palestine	"for their courage and determined reporting of Israel's genocide on Gazans."	Seher Aydar (born 1989)	
Wael Al-Dahdouh (born 1970)	Palestine	"for their courage and determined reporting of Israel's genocide on Gazans."	Seher Aydar (born 1989)	
Hind Khoudary (born 1995)	Palestine	"for their courage and determined reporting of Israel's genocide on Gazans."	Seher Aydar (born 1989)	
Bisan Owda (born 1998)	Palestine	"for their courage and determined reporting of Israel's genocide on Gazans."	Seher Aydar (born 1989)	
Khaing Zar Aung (born 1984)	Myanmar		Freddy André Øvstegård (born 1994)	
Yasmina Cánovas (born ?)	Spain	"for helping the people of Sierra Leone and fighting against the barbarism in which they lived."	All People's Congress; Teivo Teivainen (born 1965)	
Pemi Fortuny (born 1969)	Spain	"for helping the people of Sierra Leone and fighting against the barbarism in which they lived."	All People's Congress; Teivo Teivainen (born 1965)	
Chow Hang-tung (born 1985)	Hong Kong	"for her tireless fight against the Chinese authorities' stifling of democracy and freedom of expression in Hong Kong."	Guri Melby (born 1981)	
Pope Francis (1936–2025)	Vatican City	"for having consistently promoted a strong message about the necessity for comprehensive peace and reconciliation not only between states, but also between people and ethnic groups of different backgrounds."	Dag Inge Ulstein (born 1980)	
António Guterres (born 1949)	Portugal	"for his personal courage and integrity in the face of the wars in Ukraine and Gaza, his clear voice in the climate fight and his important fight for human rights and international law."	Lan Marie Berg (born 1987)	
António Guterres (born 1949)	Portugal	"[with United Nations] for the work on Gaza, Ukraine, climate change and the food crisis."	Audun Lysbakken (born 1977)	
Heidi Kuhn (born 1958)	United States	"for pioneering work in transforming deadly minefields into thriving vineyards and orchards, a mission encapsulated by the initiative "MINES TO VINES"."	The International Eurasia Press Fund	
Elon Musk (born 1971)	Canada; South Africa; United States	"for his adamant defense of dialogue, free speech and [enabling] the possibility to express one's views' in a continuously more polarized world."	Marius Nilsen (born 1984)	
Gustavo Petro (born 1960)	Colombia	"for promoting an innovative, modern and comprehensive peace policy, creating lasting peace in Colombia."	Rasmus Hansson (born 1954)	
Jens Stoltenberg (born 1959)	Norway	"for his work to achieve peace and democracy in Europe and the world in the last year."	Abid Raja (born 1975)	
Ilham Tohti (born 1969)	China	"for his role as 'the true symbol of the Uyghur people's fight for freedom' under Chinese rule in Xinjiang."	Enver Can (born 1969); Samuel Cogolati (born 1989); Vanessa Frangville (born 1981) et al. (Note: Can, Cogolati and Frangville nominated Ilham Tohti together with 177 ministers, parliamentarians, university rectors and professors from countries including Canada, Japan, Rwanda, Australia, Paraguay, Turkey and France.)	
Ilham Tohti (born 1969)	China	"in recognition of all those struggling to exercise their fundamental human rights in the People's Republic of China."	Chris Smith (born 1953); Jeff Merkley (born 1956)	
Jimmy Lai (born 1947)	Hong Kong	"in recognition of all those struggling to exercise their fundamental human rights in the People's Republic of China."	Chris Smith (born 1953); Jeff Merkley (born 1956)	
Ding Jiaxi (born 1967)	China	"in recognition of all those struggling to exercise their fundamental human rights in the People's Republic of China."	Chris Smith (born 1953); Jeff Merkley (born 1956)	
Xu Zhiyong (born 1973)	China	"in recognition of all those struggling to exercise their fundamental human rights in the People's Republic of China."	Chris Smith (born 1953); Jeff Merkley (born 1956)	
Donald Trump (born 1946)	United States	"for his role in the Abraham Accords treaty, which formally normalized relations between the United Arab Emirates, Bahrain and Israel."	Claudia Tenney (born 1961)	
Ruben Vardanyan (born 1968)	Russia; Armenia	"for the creation and support for around five dozen new and unprecedented educational, charitable, scientific and humanitarian structures not only in Armenia, but also in a number of other countries"	"a group of renowned public and political figures, including a Nobel Laureate"	
Maung Zarni (born 1963)	Myanmar	"for non-violence campaigners for peace and freedom from Tibet, East Timor (now Timor Leste), Nigeria, India, Thailand, Palestine and the Jewish diaspora"	Mairead Maguire (born 1944)	
Organizations
Al-Haq (founded 1979)	Palestine	"for their invaluable effort in documenting and publicizing human rights violations to which the Palestinians are exposed."	Marian Abdi Hussein (born 1986)	
B'Tselem	Israel	"for their invaluable effort in documenting and publicizing human rights violations to which the Palestinians are exposed."	Marie Sneve Martinussen (born 1985)	
The Arava Institute for Environmental Studies	Israel	"for groundbreaking work in the fields of dialogue and diplomacy, climate engagement, education, and research."	Merle Lefkoff; Gabriel Eckstein; Lori Lefkovitz (born 1956)	
Belarusian organization "Our House" (founded in 2002)	Belarus	"for their unwavering dedication in advocating for the right to conscientious objection to military service and promoting human rights and peace in their respective countries."	International Peace Bureau	
Russian Movement of Conscientious Objectors (founded in 2014)	Russia	"for their unwavering dedication in advocating for the right to conscientious objection to military service and promoting human rights and peace in their respective countries."	International Peace Bureau	
Ukrainian Pacifist Movement (founded in 2019)	Ukraine	"for their unwavering dedication in advocating for the right to conscientious objection to military service and promoting human rights and peace in their respective countries."	International Peace Bureau	
Breaking the Silence (founded 2004)	Israel		Hege Bae Nyholt (born 1978)	
The Freedom Theatre (founded 2006)	Palestine	"for its peaceful resistance to the Israeli occupation in the West Bank through the arts."	Hege Bae Nyholt (born 1978)	
Boycott, Divestment and Sanctions (BDS) (founded 2005)	Palestine		Bjørnar Moxnes (born 1981)	
Care International (founded 1945)	Switzerland		Kathrine Kleveland (born 1966)	
Defence for Children – Palestine (founded 1979)	Palestine	"for investigating and documenting human rights violations against children, and providing legal services to children in urgent need living in the West Bank, East Jerusalem, and the Gaza Strip."	Tobias Drevland Lund (born 1996)	
Doctors Without Borders (MSF) (founded 1971)	France	"for its work with refugees and humanitarian support for Gaza."	Grete Wold (born 1968)	
EcoPeace (founded in 1994)	Israel	"for bringing communities together to build peace in the Middle East with a special focus on the role of women and climate justice."	Vrije Universiteit Amsterdam	
EcoPeace (founded in 1994)	Palestine	"for bringing communities together to build peace in the Middle East with a special focus on the role of women and climate justice."	Vrije Universiteit Amsterdam	
EcoPeace (founded in 1994)	Jordan	"for bringing communities together to build peace in the Middle East with a special focus on the role of women and climate justice."	Vrije Universiteit Amsterdam	
Women Wage Peace (founded in 2014)	Israel	"for bringing communities together to build peace in the Middle East with a special focus on the role of women and climate justice."	Vrije Universiteit Amsterdam	
Women of the Sun (founded in 2021)	Palestine	"for bringing communities together to build peace in the Middle East with a special focus on the role of women and climate justice."	Vrije Universiteit Amsterdam	
Gaza Healthcare Workers	Palestine	"for their heroic efforts in the face of unimaginable humanitarian devastation in Gaza."	Claire Hanna (born 1980)	
International Criminal Court (ICC) (founded 2002)	Netherlands	"for its work in investigating and punishing war crimes, including in Israel, Palestine and Ukraine."	Andreas Sjalg Unneland (born 1994)	
International Committee of the Red Cross (ICRC) (founded 1863)	Switzerland	"for their work to save lives in the ongoing Gaza war."	Kirsti Bergstø (born 1981)	
Palestine Red Crescent Society (founded 1968)	Palestine	"for their work to save lives in the ongoing Gaza war."	Kirsti Bergstø (born 1981)	
International Court of Justice (ICJ) (founded 1945)	United Nations	"for having restored faith in international law and the UN's ability to act to stop war and civilian suffering."	Ingrid Fiskaa (born 1977)	
International Court of Justice (ICJ) (founded 1945)	United Nations	"for its efforts to settle legal disputes that arise between states."	Sveinung Rotevatn (born 1987)	
Junior Achievement (founded in 1919)	United States			
Reporters Without Borders (RSF) (founded in 1985)	France	"for their relentless efforts against disinformation and propaganda, contributing significantly to promoting a more informed and transparent global society."	Sveinung Stensland (born 1972)	
Sleeping Giants France (founded 2017)	France	for "undeniable impact through their innovative name-and-shame approach to cleaning up the internet and cutting off the advertising revenue of hate speech"	Éric Bothorel (born 1966)	
Union of Palestinian Women's Committees (UPWC) (founded 1980)	Palestine		Mímir Kristjánsson (born 1986)	
United Nations (founded 1945)	United Nations	"[with Guterres] for the work on Gaza, Ukraine, climate change and the food crisis."	Audun Lysbakken (born 1977)	
United Nations High Commissioner for Refugees (UNHCR) (founded 1950)	United Nations	"for its efforts to give people the most dignified life possible is conflict mitigation and peacekeeping."	Lars Haltbrekken (born 1971)	
United Nations Relief and Works Agency (UNRWA) (founded 1949)	United Nations	"for their long-term work in providing vital support to Palestine and to the region in general."	Åsmund Aukrust (born 1985)	
United World Colleges (founded in 1962)	United Kingdom	"in recognition for the schools' emphasis on respect and understanding for other people and cultures, contributing to a more peaceful world."	Alfred Bjørlo (born 1972)	
World Uyghur Congress (founded in 2005)	Germany	"for their valuable efforts in advancing democracy and human rights for Uyghurs."	Alexis Brunelle-Duceppe (born 1979); Giulio Terzi (born 1946)	
