= Shigeru Ishiba =

Prime Minister of Japan from 2024 to 2025

- 石破 茂
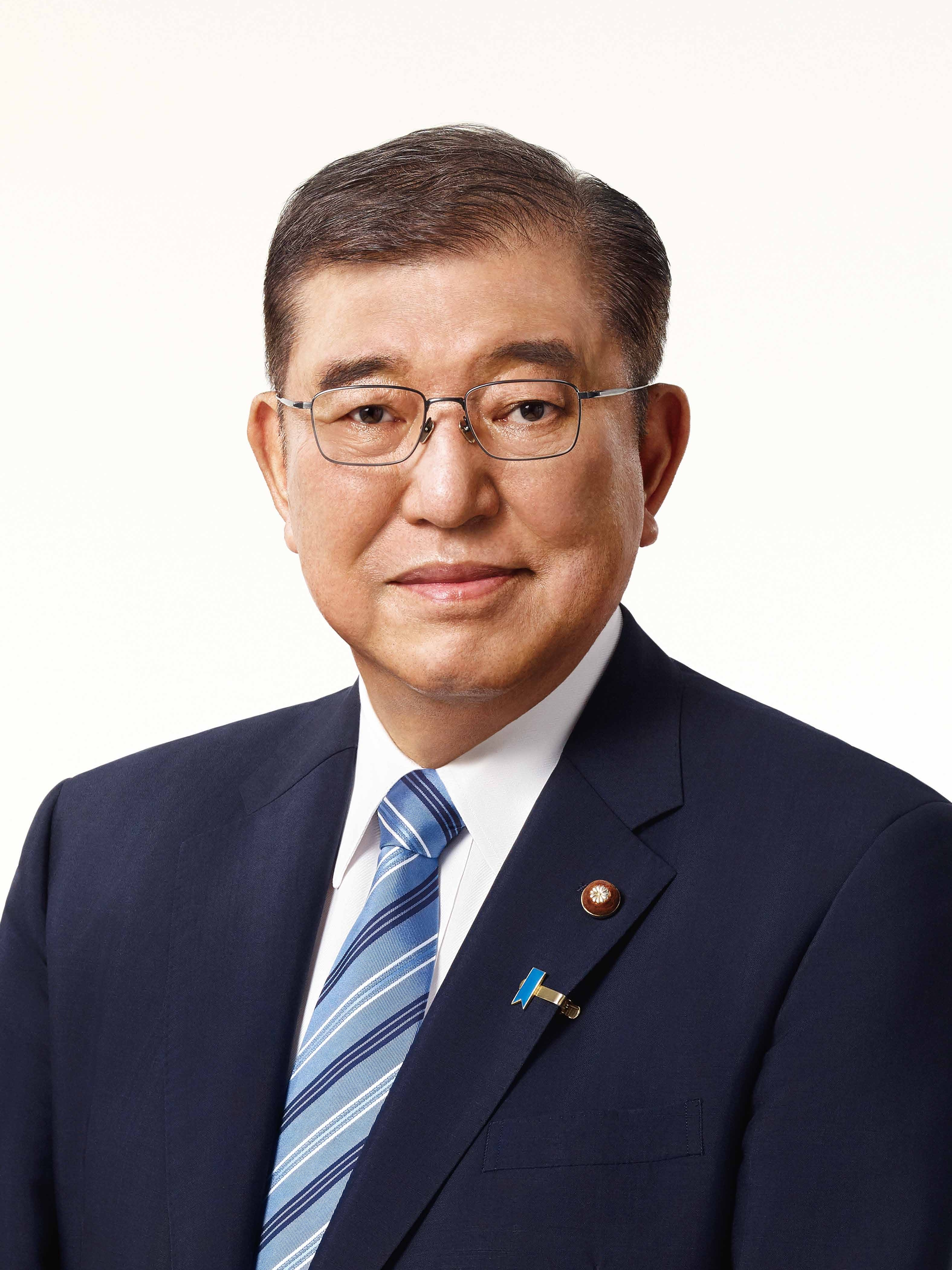
- Official portrait, 2024

Prime Minister of Japan
- In office 1 October 2024 – 21 October 2025
- Monarch: Naruhito
- Preceded by: Fumio Kishida
- Succeeded by: Sanae Takaichi

President of the Liberal Democratic Party
- In office 27 September 2024 – 4 October 2025
- Vice President: Yoshihide Suga
- Secretary-General: Hiroshi Moriyama
- Preceded by: Fumio Kishida
- Succeeded by: Sanae Takaichi
Ministerial offices
Minister in charge of Overcoming Population Decline and Vitalizing Local Economy
In office 3 September 2014 – 3 August 2016
Prime Minister	Shinzo Abe
Preceded by	Office established
Succeeded by	Kozo Yamamoto
Minister of Agriculture, Forestry and Fisheries
In office 24 September 2008 – 16 September 2009
Prime Minister	Tarō Asō
Preceded by	Seiichi Ota; Nobutaka Machimura (acting)
Succeeded by	Hirotaka Akamatsu
Minister of Defense
In office 26 September 2007 – 2 August 2008
Prime Minister	Yasuo Fukuda
Preceded by	Masahiko Kōmura
Succeeded by	Yoshimasa Hayashi
Director-General of the Japan Defense Agency
In office 30 September 2002 – 27 September 2004
Prime Minister	Junichiro Koizumi
Preceded by	Gen Nakatani
Succeeded by	Yoshinori Ohno
Deputy Director-General of the Japan Defense Agency
In office 6 January 2001 – 26 April 2001
Prime Minister	Yoshirō Mori
Preceded by	Office established
Succeeded by	Kyogon Hagiyama
Parliamentary Secretary for Defense
In office 6 December 2000 – 6 January 2001
Prime Minister	Yoshirō Mori
Preceded by	Seiji Nakamura; Masataka Suzuki
Succeeded by	Office abolished
Parliamentary Secretary for Agriculture, Forestry and Fisheries
In office 4 July 2000 – 5 December 2000; Serving with Issui Miura
Prime Minister	Yoshirō Mori
Preceded by	Yoshio Yatsu; Katsutoshi Kaneda
Succeeded by	Toshikatsu Matsuoka; Naoki Tanaka
In office 26 December 1992 – 21 June 1993; Serving with Ryōtarō Sudo
Prime Minister	Kiichi Miyazawa
Preceded by	Koji Futada; Takao Jinnouchi
Succeeded by	Takehiko Endo
Party political offices
Secretary-General of the Liberal Democratic Party
In office 26 September 2012 – 3 September 2014
President	Shinzo Abe
Preceded by	Nobuteru Ishihara
Succeeded by	Sadakazu Tanigaki
Chairperson of the Policy Research Council
In office 29 September 2009 – 30 September 2011
President	Sadakazu Tanigaki
Preceded by	Kosuke Hori
Succeeded by	Toshimitsu Motegi

Member of the House of Representatives
- Incumbent
- Assumed office 8 July 1986
- Preceded by: Yasuo Shimada
- Constituency: Tottori at-large (1986–1996); Tottori 1st (1996–present)
- Majority: 85,456 (68.2%)

Personal details
- Born: 4 February 1957 (age 69) Chiyoda, Tokyo, Japan
- Party: Liberal Democratic (1986–1993; 1997–present)
- Other political affiliations: Renewal (1993–1994); New Frontier (1994–1996); Independent (1996–1997)
- Spouse: Yoshiko Nakamura (m. 1983)
- Children: 2
- Parent: Jirō Ishiba (father)
- Education: Keio University (LLB)
- Website: Official website

Japanese name
- Kanji: 石破 茂
- Revised Hepburn: Ishiba Shigeru
- Ishiba's voice Ishiba on banning corporate donations by the end of the fiscal year Recorded 6 January 2025

Shigeru Ishiba (Note: Japanese: 石破 茂) (born 4 February 1957) is a Japanese politician who served as Prime Minister of Japan and President of the Liberal Democratic Party (LDP) from 2024 until his resignation in 2025. He has represented Tottori 1st in the House of Representatives since 1996. Before his premiership, he was the Minister of Defense from 2007 to 2008 and Minister of Agriculture, Forestry and Fisheries from 2008 to 2009, as well as Secretary-General of the LDP from 2012 to 2014.

The son of politician Jirō Ishiba, he graduated from Keio University in 1979. Prior to entering politics after his father's death, Ishiba worked at a bank before being elected to the House of Representatives in the 1986 general election as a member of the LDP at the age of 29. As a Diet member, Ishiba specialized in agricultural policy and defense policy. He served as parliamentary vice minister of agriculture under the premiership of Kiichi Miyazawa, but left the LDP in 1993 to join the Japan Renewal Party. After transitioning through several parties and returning to the LDP in 1997, Ishiba held various prominent positions, including Director-general of the Defense Agency under the premiership of Junichiro Koizumi, minister of defense under the premiership of Yasuo Fukuda and minister of agriculture, forestry and fisheries under the premiership of Tarō Asō. Ishiba became a key figure within the LDP, running for party leadership multiple times. First in 2008 where he placed fifth, and notably against Shinzo Abe in the 2012 and 2018 elections. Despite his criticisms of LDP factionalism, he established his own faction, Suigetsukai, in 2015, aiming for leadership. After Abe's second resignation, Ishiba ran again for party president in 2020, but placed third behind Yoshihide Suga. Ishiba declined to run and endorsed Taro Kono in the 2021 election, which was won by Fumio Kishida. After Kishida announced that he would step down, Ishiba contested for the fifth time in the 2024 election where he defeated Sanae Takaichi in a second round run-off, becoming the new party leader and prime minister–designate, and was formally elected Prime Minister by the National Diet on 1 October 2024.

As prime minister, Ishiba almost immediately announced a snap general election, where the ruling LDP coalition lost its majority in the House of Representatives for the first time since 2009, suffering its second-worst result in party history. In the National Diet, Ishiba relied on opposition parties to pass legislation due to his coalition's minority government status. On foreign policy, Ishiba moved Japan economically closer to India and South Korea amidst protectionist policies being employed by the United States, while continuing to support Ukraine during the Russian invasion that began in 2022. After the LDP-Komeito coalition lost its majority in the House of Councillors after a poor result in the 2025 election, Ishiba began to face calls within the LDP for him to resign. Ishiba initially announced he planned to remain as prime minister, citing the need to see through tariff negotiations with the United States. He eventually announced his intention to resign as party president and as prime minister in September 2025, and was succeeded as prime minister by Takaichi the next month.

Ishiba has developed a reputation throughout his career as a political maverick due to his willingness to criticize his own party, as well as his relatively liberal stances on social issues; he supported a motion of no-confidence against the Miyazawa Cabinet in 1993 and criticized Abe throughout his second premiership, despite serving in the governments of both prime ministers. During his tenure as prime minister however, Ishiba was criticized for being too hesitant to embrace reform and for reversing several of his earlier positions.

== Early life ==
Ishiba was born on 4 February 1957, in Chiyoda, Tokyo, while his registered domicile was his father's hometown in the Yazu District of Tottori Prefecture. His father, Jirō Ishiba, was a government official then serving as Vice Minister of Construction. His mother was a teacher and a granddaughter of the Christian minister Michitomo Kanamori. Jirō Ishiba was elected Governor of Tottori Prefecture in 1958, so the family moved to Tottori; Ishiba has no memory of living in Tokyo. Jirō Ishiba would serve as governor until 1974, and was later elected to the House of Councillors and served as Minister for Home Affairs in the Zenkō Suzuki Cabinet.

Shigeru Ishiba grew up and attended school in Tottori Prefecture. After graduating from Tottori University Junior High School, he moved away to attend Keio Senior High School, going on to study law at Keio University in Tokyo. After graduating in 1979, he began working at the Mitsui Bank. During his years at Mitsui Bank, Ishiba gained experience in finance before leaving the private sector following the death of his father. Encouraged by former prime minister Kakuei Tanaka, he entered politics and successfully contested the 1986 general election at the age of 29. His father died in 1981. Former prime minister Kakuei Tanaka, who was a friend of his father, served as chairman of the funeral committee. Tanaka encouraged Ishiba to become a politician to carry on his father's legacy.

== Political career (1986–2024) ==
=== Backbencher ===
Ishiba left the bank in 1983 and began working in the secretariat of the Thursday Club, Kakuei Tanaka's faction of the Liberal Democratic Party. In the 1986 Japanese general election Ishiba ran as an LDP candidate in the Tottori at-large district and was elected to the House of Representatives. At the age of 29, he was the youngest member of the House at the time.

As a junior Diet member, Ishiba specialised in agricultural policy, but the Gulf War in 1990 and a 1992 visit to North Korea spurred his interest in defense policy. He served as parliamentary vice minister of agriculture under the Miyazawa Cabinet, before defecting from the LDP in 1993, for the Japan Renewal Party. When the Japan Renewal Party merged with several other parties, Ishiba became part of the New Frontier Party, but he was disillusioned by the constant struggles between Ozawa and non-Ozawa factions in the party and left in 1996. He rejoined the LDP the following year.

=== Cabinet minister and LDP leadership campaigns ===
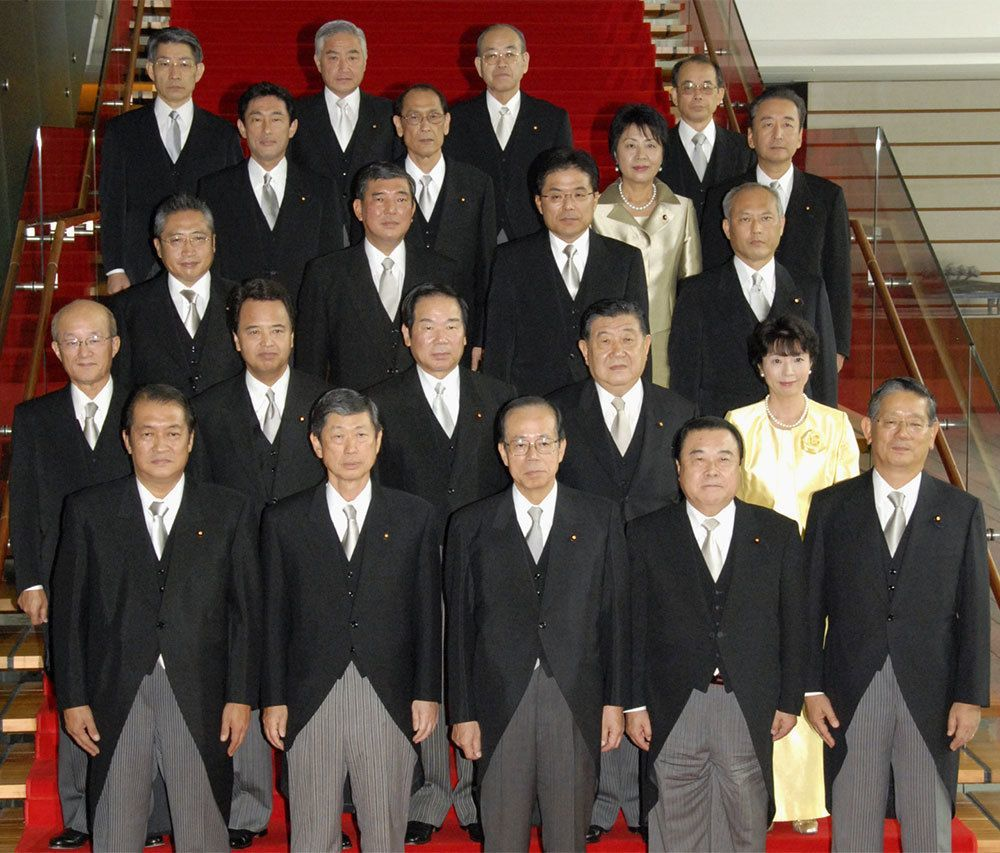
Ishiba, third row, second from left, with the other members of the Yasuo Fukuda Cabinet, 26 September 2007

Ishiba was reappointed parliamentary vice minister of Agriculture under the Mori Cabinet in July 2000 but was switched to the position of deputy director general of the Defense Agency in December. He was replaced when the Koizumi Cabinet was appointed. When Koizumi reshuffled the cabinet in September 2002, Ishiba became Director General of the Defense Agency, entering the cabinet for the first time. Ishiba served as director general during the 2003 invasion of Iraq by an American-led coalition. He defended the legality of the invasion and paved the way for the first overseas deployment of the Japanese Self-Defense Forces without a UN mandate, sending troops to Iraq in January 2004 to assist with reconstruction efforts. He left cabinet in September 2004.

Ishiba was appointed as the Minister of Defense in the cabinet of Prime Minister Yasuo Fukuda on 26 September 2007, serving in that post until 1 August 2008. Ishiba was the second person in the cabinet of Fukuda to express belief in the existence of UFOs after Nobutaka Machimura. Asked on a response to a hypothetical appearance of a UFO, Ishiba said that it would be "difficult" to determine if such an incident amounted to an airspace violation, saying that a UFO was technically not an aircraft from a foreign country. In the same interview, he jokingly said that he would mobilize the Japan Self-Defense Forces in response to an appearance by Godzilla.

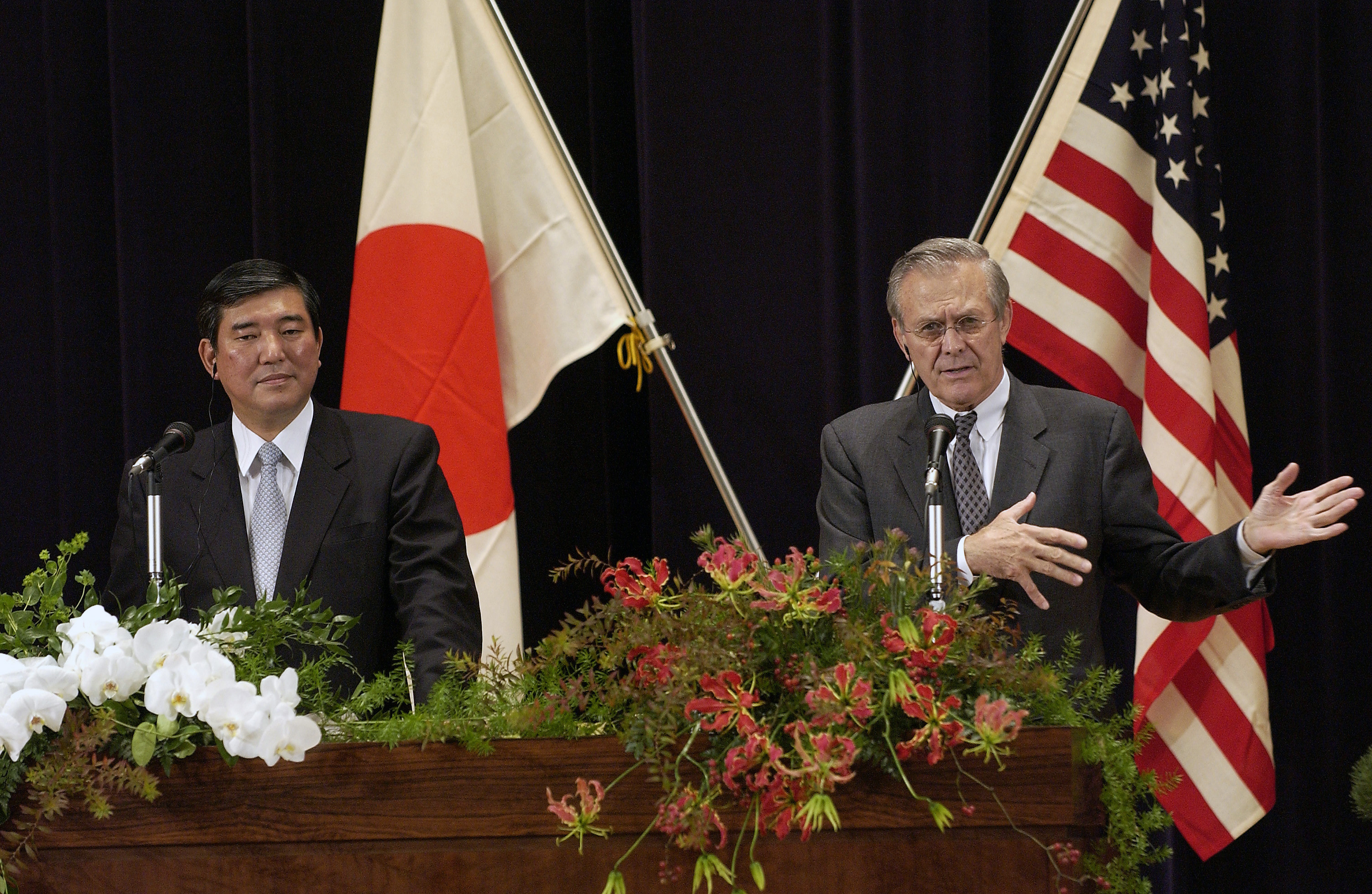
Ishiba and US Defense Secretary Donald Rumsfeld in Tokyo on 15 November 2003

Following Fukuda's resignation, Ishiba stood as a candidate for the LDP presidency. In the leadership election, held on 22 September 2008, Tarō Asō won with 351 of the 527 votes; Ishiba placed fifth and last with 25 votes. In Asō Cabinet, appointed on 24 September 2008, Ishiba was named as Minister of Agriculture, Forestry and Fisheries. He called for Asō to resign after the LDP's defeat in the 2009 Tokyo Metropolitan Assembly election. Ishiba retained his seat in the 2009 House of Representatives election, otherwise a crushing defeat for the LDP. After Sadakazu Tanigaki was elected to replace Asō as party president, Ishiba was appointed chairman of the Policy Research Council, one of the top positions in the party. Ishiba was thus one of the most prominent LDP figures when the party was in opposition. He was removed when Tanigaki reshuffled the party leadership in September 2011.

In September 2012, while the LDP was still in opposition, Ishiba again stood for the presidency of the LDP and was narrowly defeated by former prime minister Shinzo Abe. He accepted the position of secretary-general on 27 September 2012. Ishiba was re-appointed to the position under Abe's second premiership after the December 2012 general election in which the LDP returned to government. Ishiba attracted considerable criticism for his statement in November 2013 that likened peaceful public protests against the new secrecy bill being introduced by his government to "acts of terrorism". He later withdrew the comment.

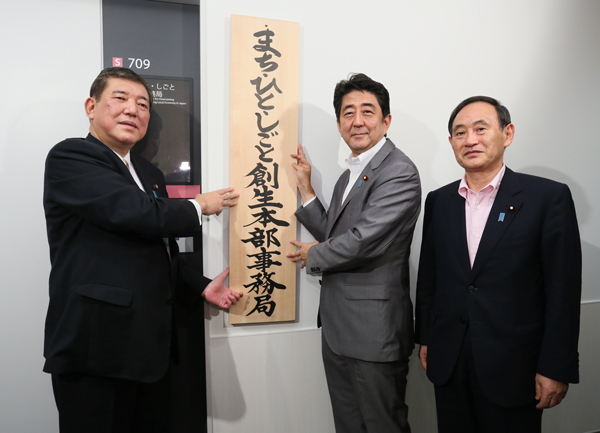
Ishiba with Japanese Prime Minister Shinzō Abe and Yoshihide Suga in September 2014

In the September 2014 cabinet reshuffle, Abe moved Ishiba from his position as LDP Secretary-General and appointed him to a newly created office of Minister for Overcoming Population Decline and Vitalizing Local Economy. He was reported to have declined the offer of a cabinet post responsible for the government's upcoming security legislation. In spite of having been a vocal critic of factionalism in the LDP, Ishiba launched his own faction, the Suigetsukai, on 28 September 2015, with the aim of succeeding sitting prime minister, Shinzo Abe. With 19 members, excluding Ishiba, it was one member short of the 20 votes required for nomination for LDP leadership.

Ishiba left the cabinet in the April 2016 reshuffle, having declined the ministry of Agriculture. Ishiba challenged Abe in the 2018 LDP presidential election but was defeated again. In 2020, following Shinzo Abe's second resignation, Ishiba ran for the leadership of the Liberal Democratic Party, losing to Yoshihide Suga, placing third overall. Ishiba declined to run in the 2021 Liberal Democratic Party leadership election, instead endorsing Taro Kono.

== Premiership (2024–2025) ==
=== 2024 LDP leadership election ===
Throughout his years outside the cabinet, Ishiba remained one of the Liberal Democratic Party's most popular politicians among grassroots party members despite repeatedly failing to secure enough support from lawmakers in leadership elections. Political observers frequently described him as a policy-oriented politician with expertise in defence and regional revitalisation. Then-LDP leader and prime minister Fumio Kishida announced on 14 August 2024 that he would not seek re-election as LDP leader in the leadership election in September, effectively resigning as prime minister, following record-low approval ratings from an ongoing slush fund scandal and previous controversies with the LDP's affiliation with the Unification Church.

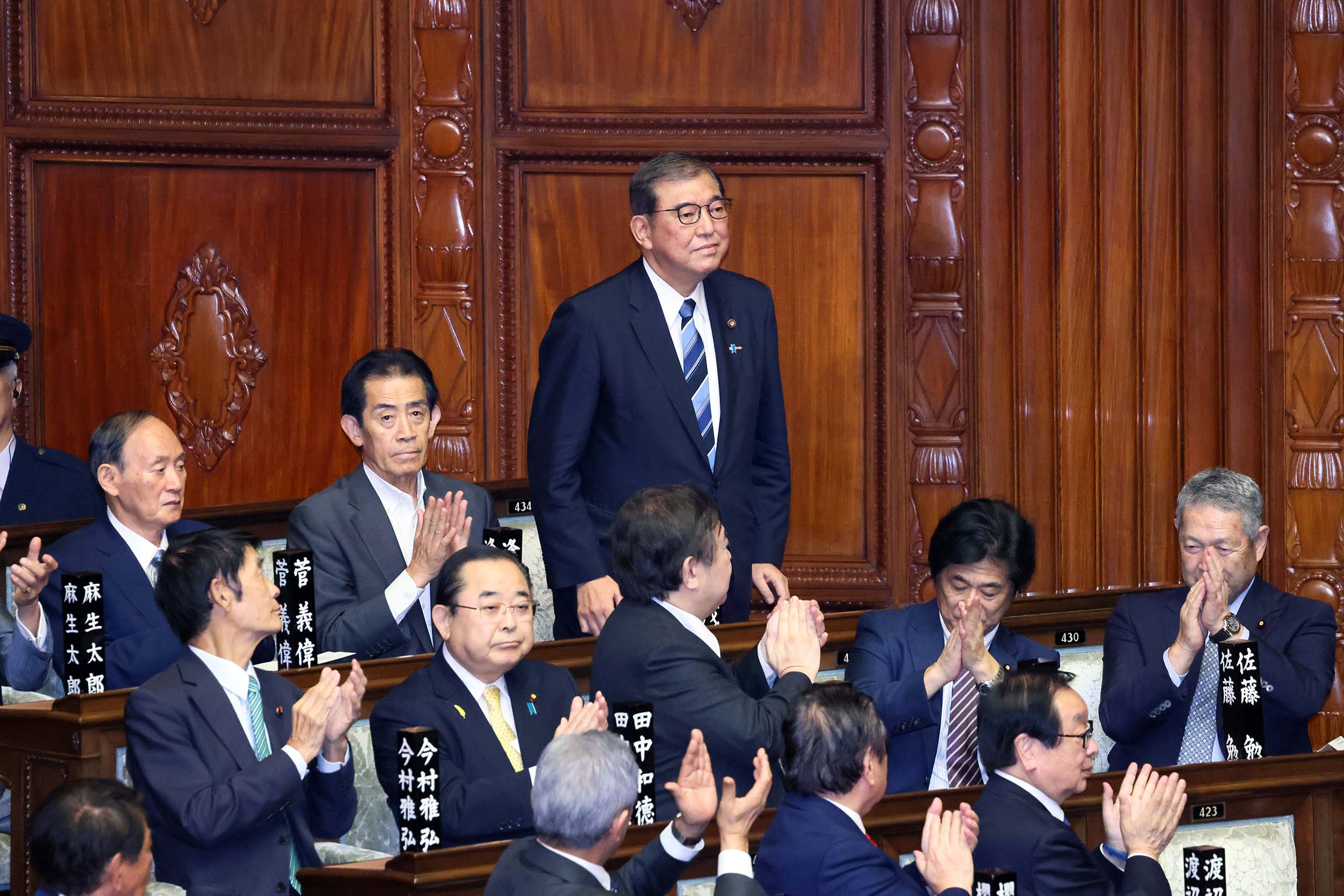
Ishiba is elected as Prime Minister by the Diet, 1 October 2024.

In August 2024, Ishiba published a book, Conservative Politician — My Policies, My Destiny, which would serve as something of a guide and manifesto for his 2024 leadership campaign. In the book, he described himself as a "conservative liberal" who was in favor of discussions regarding same-sex marriage, and advocated for deleting the second paragraph of Article 9 in the Constitution, which renounces Japan's right to wage offensive war. He also proposed changing the Self-Defense Forces to simply the "National Defense Force".

Various polls had Ishiba in first place as preferred prime minister among the public ahead of the imminent leadership election. He officially launched his campaign on 24 August. During his campaign announcement, Ishiba stated he would strive to reduce Japan's dependence on nuclear energy and modify legislation to not allow married couples to choose different surnames. On LDP lawmakers implicated in the slush fund scandal, Ishiba said that the ‘new leadership team’ would decide if they could run with the endorsement of the LDP in the next general election. Ishiba visited outgoing prime minister Kishida in the Kantei on 30 August to discuss the issue.

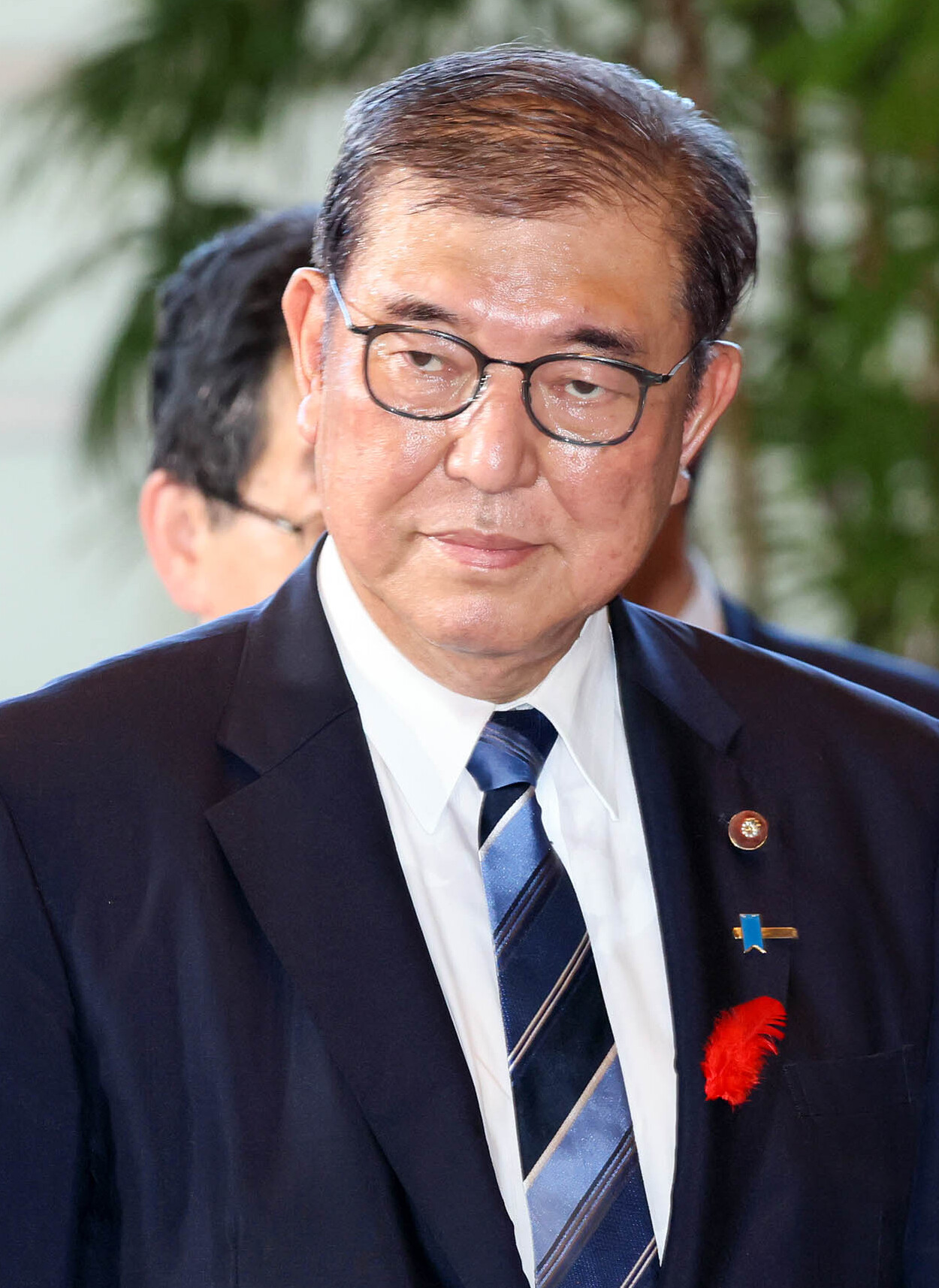
Ishiba arrives in the Kantei, 1 October 2024.

Ishiba alongside Sanae Takaichi and Shinjirō Koizumi emerged as the frontrunners to succeed him. In the leadership election on 27 September 2024, Ishiba narrowly defeated Takaichi in a second-round runoff, winning a total of 215 votes (52.57%) from 189 parliamentary members and 26 prefectural chapters, making him the new LDP leader and prime minister–designate; the election was dubbed "Ishibamania" by the foreign media.

Ishiba's victory was described by commentators as unexpected and an upset, owing to his long history of failed leadership bids and his relative unpopularity with many LDP members of the National Diet. After his election, the Japanese stock market experienced a sudden drop in response to Ishiba's economic policies, which was named "Ishiba Shock".

Three days after the LDP presidential election, the new party officials under Ishiba were inaugurated. Ishiba appointed former prime minister Yoshihide Suga vice president of the party, while the outgoing vice president Tarō Asō was made chief advisor, and Hiroshi Moriyama became secretary general. Shun'ichi Suzuki was made chairman of the General Council after Takaichi declined the post. Itsunori Onodera was made chairman of the Policy Research Council and Shinjiro Koizumi chairman of the Election Strategy Committee. The appointments were seen as emphasizing stability in the party.

On 30 September, Ishiba announced his plans to dissolve the House of Representatives on 9 October and called for snap general election to be held on 27 October 2024. This decision, which was announced before he was elected Prime Minister by the Diet, drew criticism from opposition parties as it did not allow time for a debate at a budget committee meeting prior to the House's dissolution. Despite this resistance, the Lower House voted in favor of closing the extraordinary Diet session on 9 October.

=== Appointment and first cabinet ===
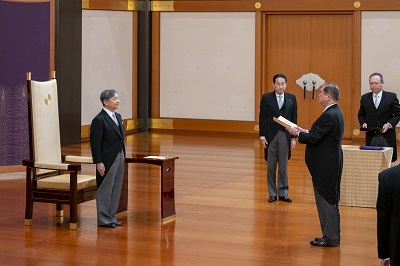
Emperor Naruhito formally appoints Ishiba to office as prime minister, 2024

Ishiba was elected by the National Diet and appointed as Prime Minister by Emperor Naruhito at Tokyo Imperial Palace on 1 October 2024, becoming the twenty-fifth Liberal Democratic prime minister. Upon taking office, Ishiba pledged to restore public trust in the government following the Liberal Democratic Party's political funding scandal. His administration also emphasized strengthening regional economies, disaster resilience and Japan's security cooperation with like-minded countries. Ishiba announced key appointments ahead of the snap general election on 27 October 2024. His Cabinet included rivals from the leadership race, though Sanae Takaichi's exclusion created internal party friction. Uniting the divided ruling party became a primary focus for Ishiba after the closely contested leadership race.

In his first policy speech on 4 October, Ishiba named Japan's low birth rate and the regional security situation as among his primary concerns, describing the former as a "quiet emergency" and the latter as at its "most severe since the end of World War II". He also pledged to continue efforts to ensure the emergence of the Japanese economy from deflation and called for stabilization in the membership of the Imperial House of Japan amid a lack of male successors to the throne. He also expressed regret for the 2023–2024 Japanese slush fund scandal.

=== 2024 general election and second cabinet ===
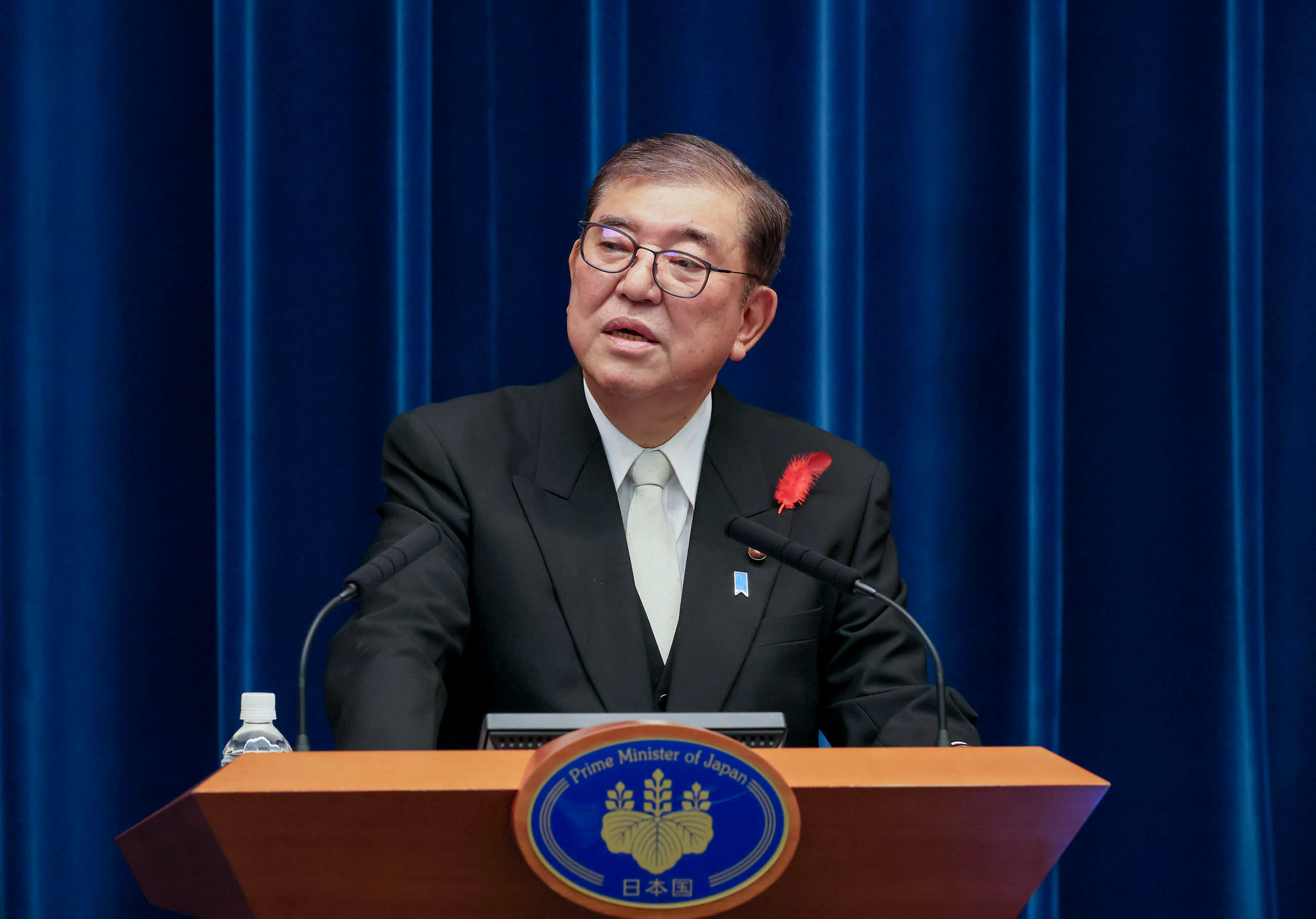
Ishiba announces a snap general election for 27 October, 1 October 2024.

On 9 October, Ishiba dissolved the House of Representatives in preparation for the general election on 27 October. Ishiba argued that it was "important for the new administration to be judged by the people as soon as possible." On the same day, the LDP decided to pull its endorsement of 12 politicians implicated in the slush fund scandal, and would not allow them to be elected via proportional representation should they lose in their single-seat constituencies. Ishiba indicated that the party would resume support for the politicians if they win reelection. Other politicians who have been disciplined by the party over the slush fund scandal would also not be allowed to run on the LDP's proportional representation list.

Despite these measures, LDP still faced its most serious defeat since the 2009 election, with 68 seats lost and therefore its majority in the Diet. The next day, Ishiba expressed his intention to remain as prime minister despite the election results. Commentators noted that his decision for the snap election may jeopardize his leadership, as rising inflation and a funding scandal threaten his LDP's majority, prompting potential alliances with smaller parties amid growing economic concerns.

On 11 November, Ishiba was reelected as prime minister of a minority government during a session of the Diet, after winning a total of 221 votes from both the first and second rounds, defeating Yoshihiko Noda of the Constitutional Democratic Party of Japan, who secured only 160 votes, following a second round runoff vote. Hours before the Diet assembled, Ishiba's first cabinet resigned, thus resulting in him making an effort to launch a second cabinet. However, it was agreed that his cabinet would mostly remain the same. Ishiba's re-election would also mark the first time in 30 years that any Japanese prime minister needed a runoff vote.

=== Domestic policy ===
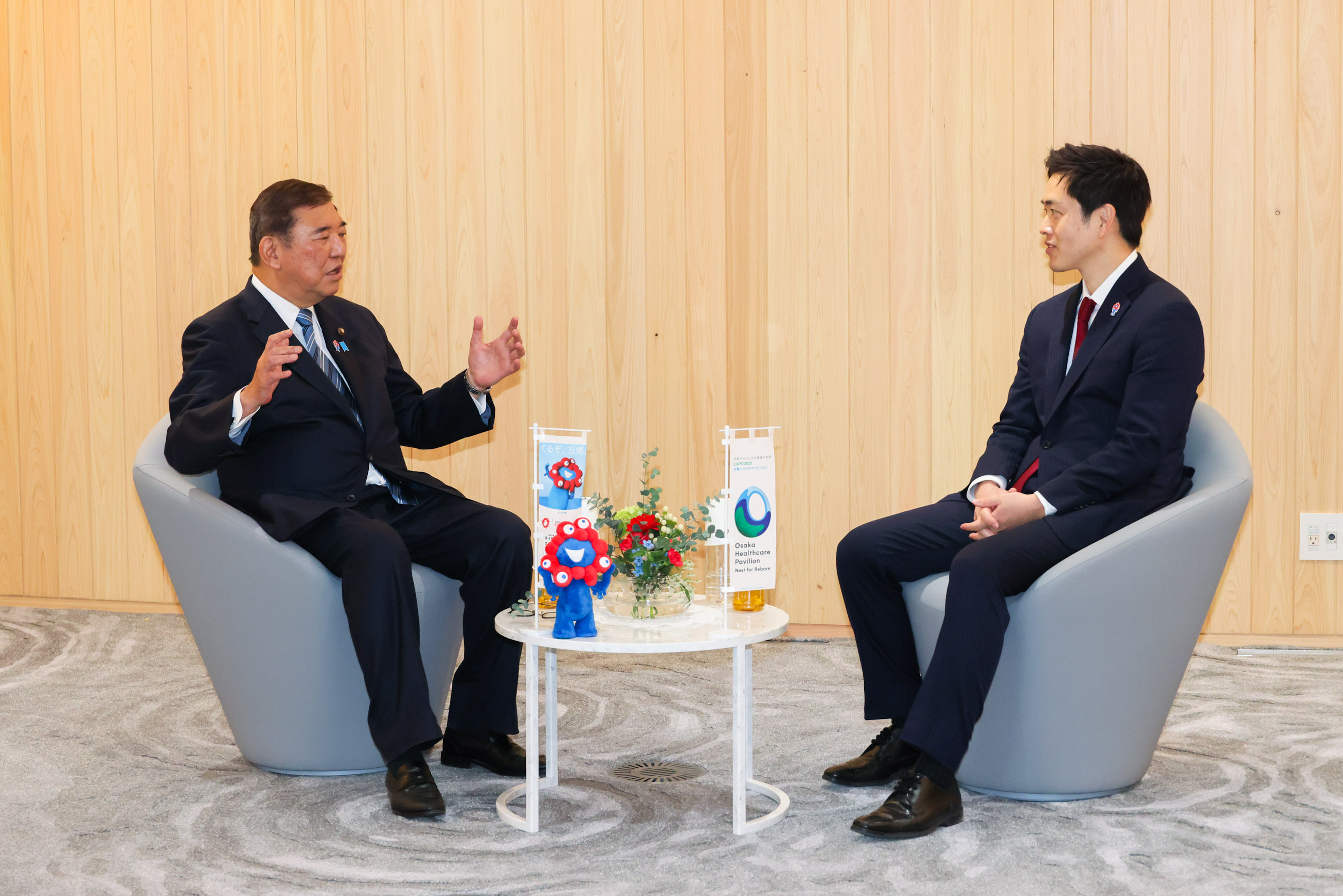
Ishiba with Osaka Governor Hirofumi Yoshimura in January 2025

During the opening ceremony of the 217th ordinary session of the Diet, Ishiba's government submitted a draft budget for the new fiscal year 2025 with the general account at over 115 trillion yen, the largest ever. The unprecedentedly large budget was attributed to social security expenses related to the aging population and the strengthening of defense capabilities that began under the previous Kishida administration. On 24 January he delivered a policy speech, proclaiming his ideal for a "fun Japan" where everyone "feels safe and secure, and people with diverse values respect each other and strive for self-realization." He also said he would prioritize regional revitalization, addressing the gender pay gap, and digitalization among other issues.

In February 2025, Ishiba worked with the opposition Japan Innovation Party to pass the 2025 fiscal year budget. The budget included provisions that called for free high school education and social insurance premium fee cuts. The agreement was signed by the LDP, Komeito, and Ishin on 26 February.

==== Social issues ====
Ishiba's government announced in January 2025 that same-sex partners will be subject to the same regulations as common-law marriages in 24 laws, including one that stipulates benefits to be paid to the families of crime victims. Consideration for legislation allowing separate surnames for married couples also began in the LDP under Ishiba's presidency. Ishiba's former rival, Sanae Takaichi, urged him to approach the topic with "caution" during internal party deliberations. He remained hesitant about introducing same-sex marriage legislation. In October 2025, during the closing days of his term, same-sex couples were recognized under more laws, after Ishiba's government decided to allow same-sex couples to be treated as if they were in de facto marriages under nine laws and ordinances, including the disaster condolence grant law.

=== Foreign policy ===
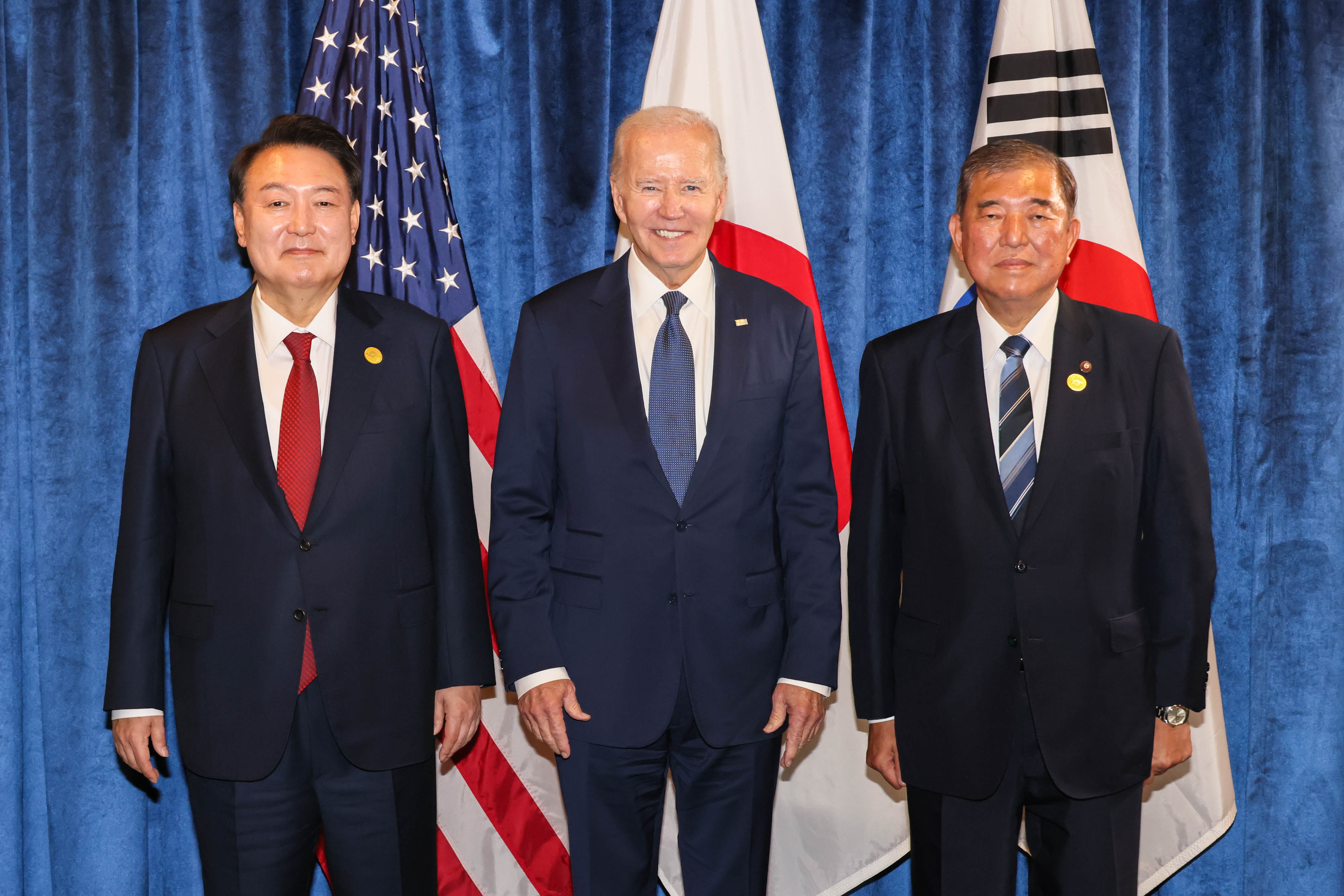
Ishiba with U.S. President Joe Biden and South Korean President Yoon Suk Yeol in November 2024

Ishiba was elected as prime minister during the closing months of Joe Biden's presidency in the United States, meeting with him at the APEC summit in Peru in November 2024, alongside South Korean president Yoon Suk Yeol. In November 2024, Ishiba urged American president Joe Biden to approve Nippon-US Steel deal, which he ultimately blocked. Later in January 2025 he held a virtual meeting with Biden and Philippine president Bongbong Marcos during which the three agreed to strengthen ties and cooperation. After Donald Trump won the 2024 presidential election, Ishiba congratulated him publicly, stating he would like to meet with him soon in his capacity as President-elect. Unlike his late former rival Shinzo Abe, Ishiba was not able to meet with Trump during his transition period.

Ishiba has also advocated strengthening security cooperation among Indo-Pacific democracies while maintaining stable diplomatic relations with neighbouring countries. Although he has promoted the idea of an "Asian NATO", he has acknowledged that such a framework would require long-term discussion with Japan's allies. After Trump's inauguration, he sent him a congratulatory letter, in which he emphasized the importance of a free and open Indo-Pacific. By February a meeting was set up between the two; Ishiba stated that he would explain to Trump Japan's high investment in the United States and its contributions to US job creation, mirroring a strategy implemented by Abe to negotiate with Trump when he was prime minister. Ishiba sought the advice of Abe's widow, Akie Abe, along with former prime minister Fumio Kishida before the meeting. He said he would seek to form a “personal relationship” with Trump. Nevertheless, Ishiba and Trump were referred to as an “odd couple” by National Review and The Economist.

==== United States and tariff negotiations ====
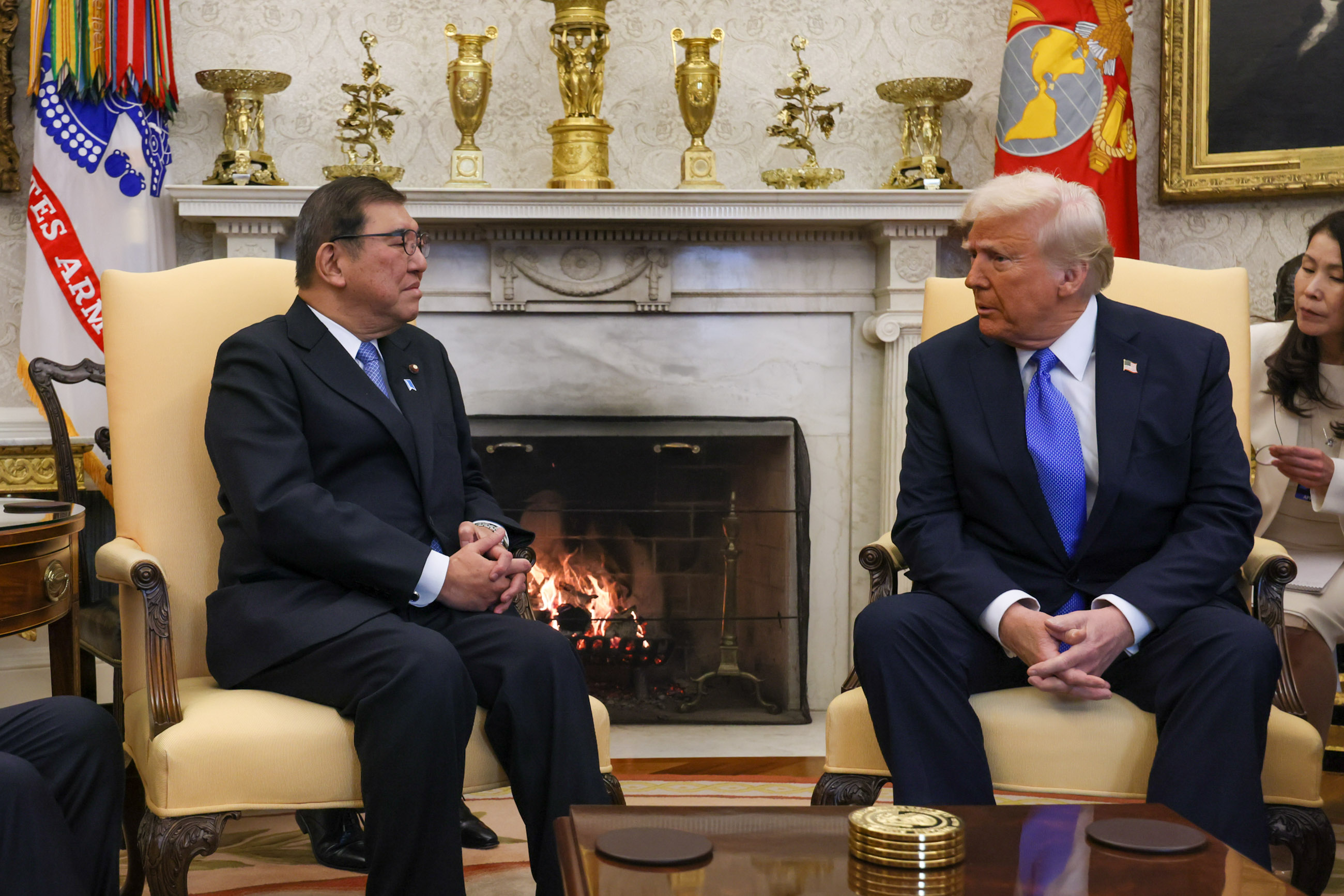
Ishiba meets with U.S. President Donald Trump at the Oval Office of the White House during Ishiba's visit to Washington D.C., 7 February 2025

Ishiba arrived in Washington D.C. on 6 February. He met with Trump the following day at the White House, where the two held a meeting followed by a press conference. During the meeting, Ishiba praised Trump, describing him as “very sincere.” He also referenced the attempted assassination of Trump that occurred in July 2024, and drew similarities between their domestic regional revitalization policies.

When speaking to the press, Trump confirmed that Nippon Steel would invest in US Steel rather than own it. He also expressed his desire to “eliminate” the United States’ $68 billion trade deficit with Japan, believing there would not be “any problems” in the relationship between the two countries. Despite this, Trump did not rule out the possibility of levying tariffs on Japan, but said it was unlikely. During the press conference, Ishiba announced that Japan would be raising its investment in the United States to $1 billion, and that Toyota and Isuzu were planning to build new factories in the United States.

On security, Trump said the US would continue to provide Japan with military security assistance and praised its efforts to increase defense spending. The two also agreed to cooperate on deterring China's economic power and reducing the threat of North Korea's nuclear weapons program. Trump and Ishiba agreed to pursue a "new golden age" for U.S.-Japan relations.

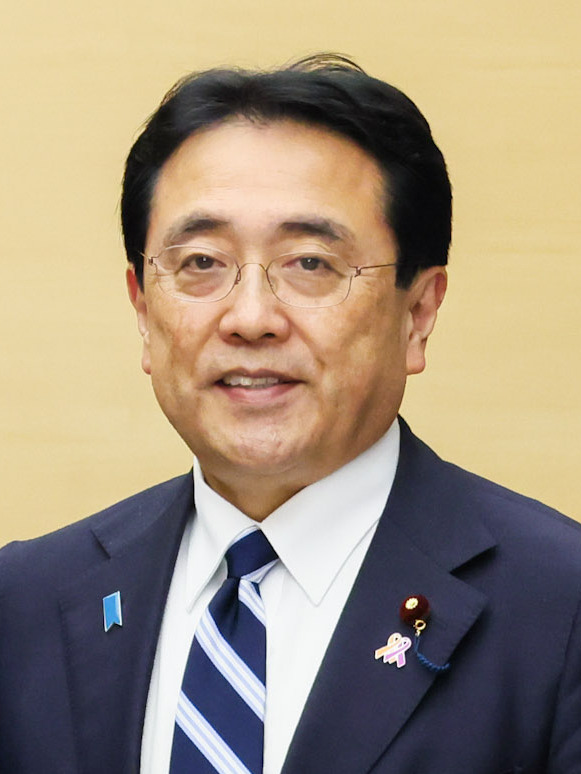
Ishiba appointed Ryōsei Akazawa, his close aide and fellow Tottori native, as chief tariff negotiator with the United States. Akazawa was the architect of a trade deal reached between Japan and the United States in July 2025.

Trump later announced 24% reciprocal tariffs on all Japanese goods on 2 April 2025. Ishiba said that the tariffs were "difficult to understand" given Japan's economic investment in the United States and its status as one of America's largest trading partners. In response to the tariffs announced by the Trump administration, Ishiba established a council of relevant ministers for a whole-of-government response. He referred to the tariff situation as “like a national crisis,” and called on the other political parties to cooperate in presenting a unified front. CDP leader Yoshihiko Noda urged Ishiba to directly negotiate with Trump. In response, Ishiba claimed that "Trump is a man who does not like to be criticized" and that "I don't know who to talk to to get through to Trump," a remark that earned criticism from Ishin co-leader Seiji Maehara. Ishiba also faced criticism from the CDP for his response to the tariffs. Finance Minister Katsunobu Kato said on 4 April that it was 'theoretically possible' to levy retaliatory tariffs, but only after "going through the [World Trade Organization] dispute settlement procedure as much as possible." That same day, Ishiba held talks with opposition parties over the tariffs. On 7 April, Ishiba said he hoped to meet with Trump again and restart negotiations. After a phone call with Trump that same day, Ishiba said he would name a special minister in charge of tariff negotiations to continue talks with the Trump administration. Chief Cabinet Secretary Yoshimasa Hayashi announced Ishiba chose Economic Revitalization Minister Ryosei Akazawa, a close aide and fellow Tottori native, to become chief tariff negotiator. The decision to appoint Akazwa was met with a mixed response among the opposition parties in the Diet. Akazawa said he would seek a face-to-face meeting with US Treasury Secretary Scott Bessent as soon as possible, aiming for reconsideration of the 10% reciprocal tariffs along with other tariffs. He left for Washington D.C. the following week to begin negotiations. Akazawa would meet with several officials from the Trump administration, including Trump himself on 16 April. Ishiba met with Trump once again during the June 2025 G7 summit held in Canada. While no agreement was reached, they both agreed to continue ministerial-level talks. The following month Trump announced that an additional 25% tariff would be imposed on Japanese products, which Ishba called “truly deplorable”. On 22 July, Trump announced a “massive trade deal” had been reached with Japan following months of negotiations. Key aspects of the agreement included a $550 billion of Japanese investment in the United States, a reduction of reciprocal tariffs from 25% to 15%, and increased mutual market access, among other things. The Guardian noted the historical significance of the deal, while arguing the failure to secure an agreement sooner brewed “political unease and economic uncertainty” within Japan, potentially unsettling Ishiba's premiership. After Ishiba resigned as Prime Minister in October 2025, newly appointed Prime Minister Sanae Takaichi retained Akazawa as Minister of Economy, Trade and Industry.

==== China and South Korea ====
Following the decision, Minister of Foreign Affairs Takeshi Iwaya visited China in December; the meeting was seen as a sign of improving ties. Later in January the LDP-led Japan-China Parliamentary Friendship Association made a trip to China. The meeting was the first of the Japan-China Ruling Party Exchange Council since October 2018. In January 2025, Ishiba's government announced that the Ministry of Foreign Affairs would be easing visa requirements for Chinese tourists. The plan sparked criticism from within the LDP.

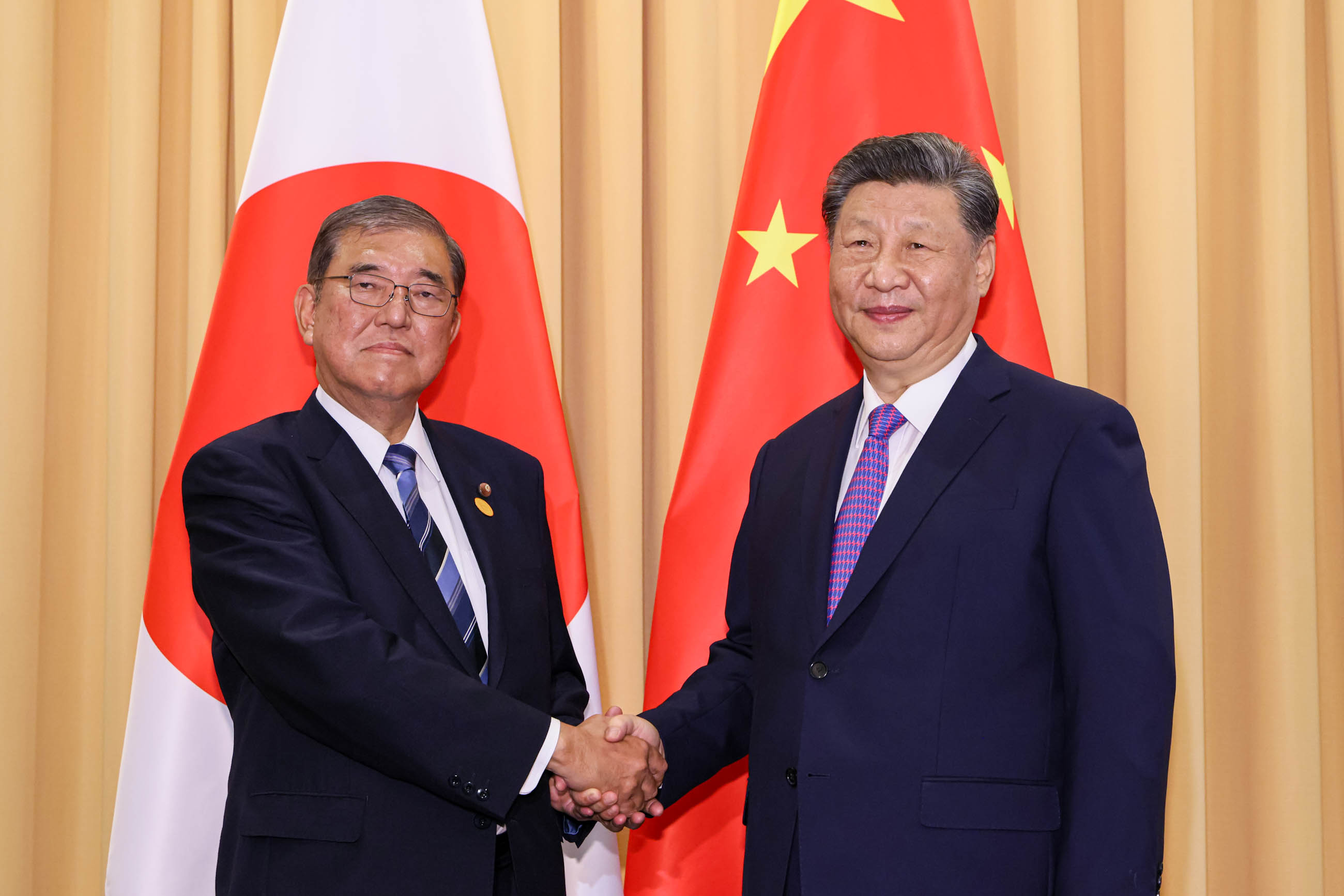
Ishiba meeting with Chinese President Xi Jinping during the 2024 APEC summit.

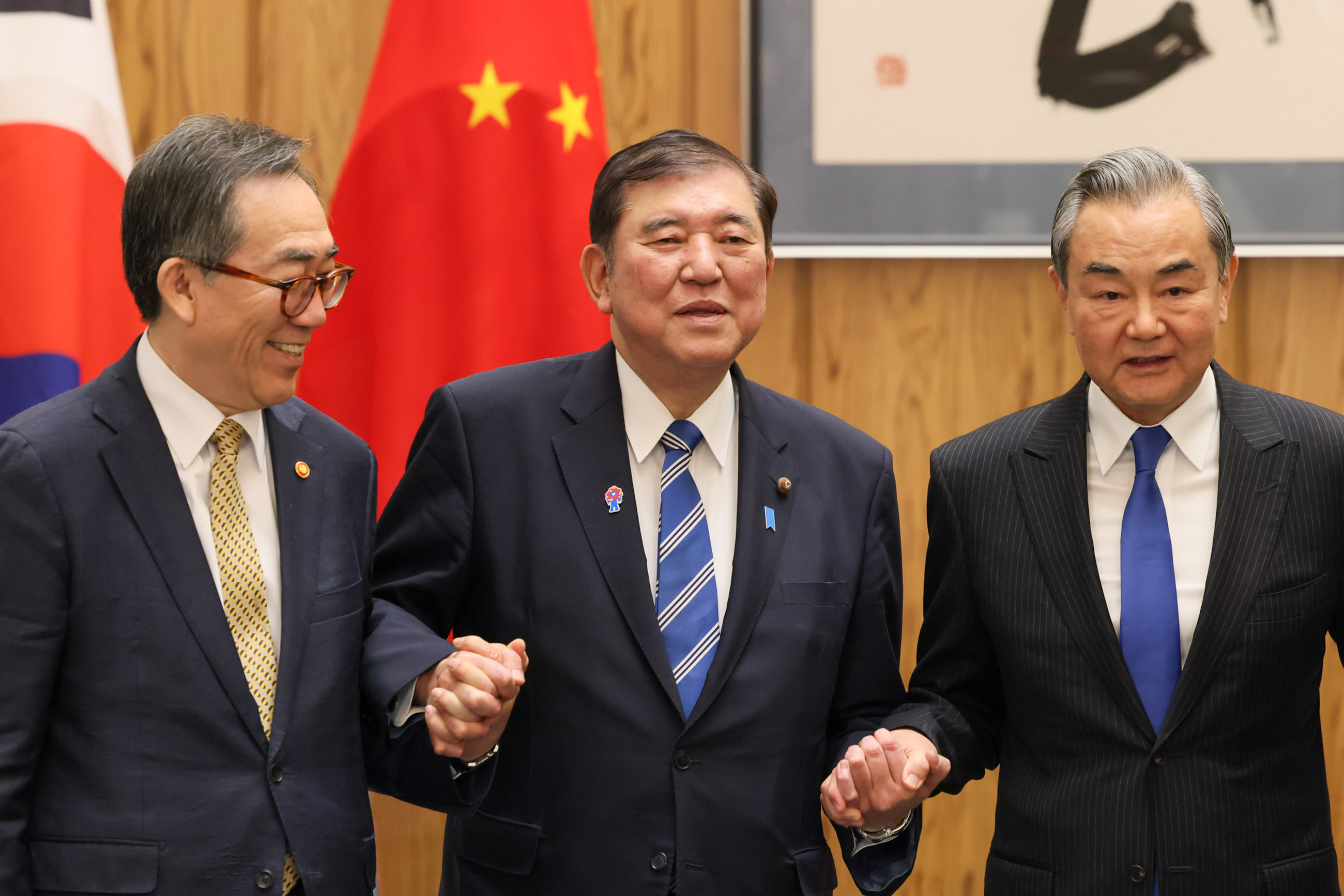
Ishiba with the Foreign Ministers of South Korea (Cho Tae-yul; left) and China (Wang Yi; right) in March 2025.

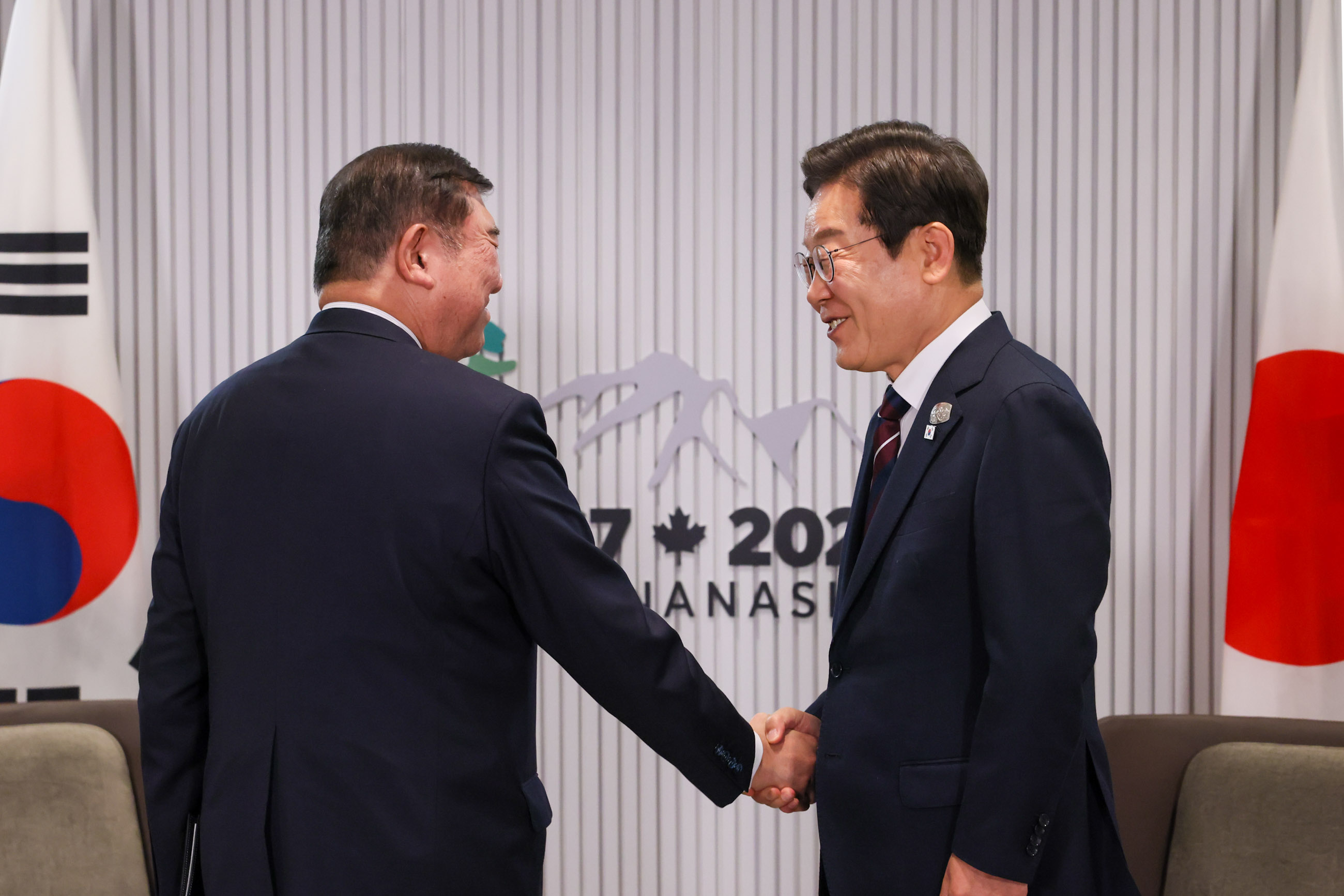
Shigeru Ishiba greeting South Korean President Lee Jae-Myung during the 2025 G7 summit.

Ishiba's diplomatic stance regarding China was notably criticized by Kōichi Hagiuda, who demanded more thorough explanations for the recent shifts in policy. A day before Donald Trump's "Liberation Day" tariffs were announced, the governments of China and South Korea in coordination with Japan, agreed to jointly respond to the expected tariffs, with the three countries agreeing to strengthen free trade. After Yoon Suk Yeol was removed from office as President of South Korea on 4 April 2025, Ishiba stated that "Regardless of administration, cooperation between Japan and South Korea is crucial not only for our security, but also for our country's independence and peace, and for peace and stability in the region."

==== Ukraine ====
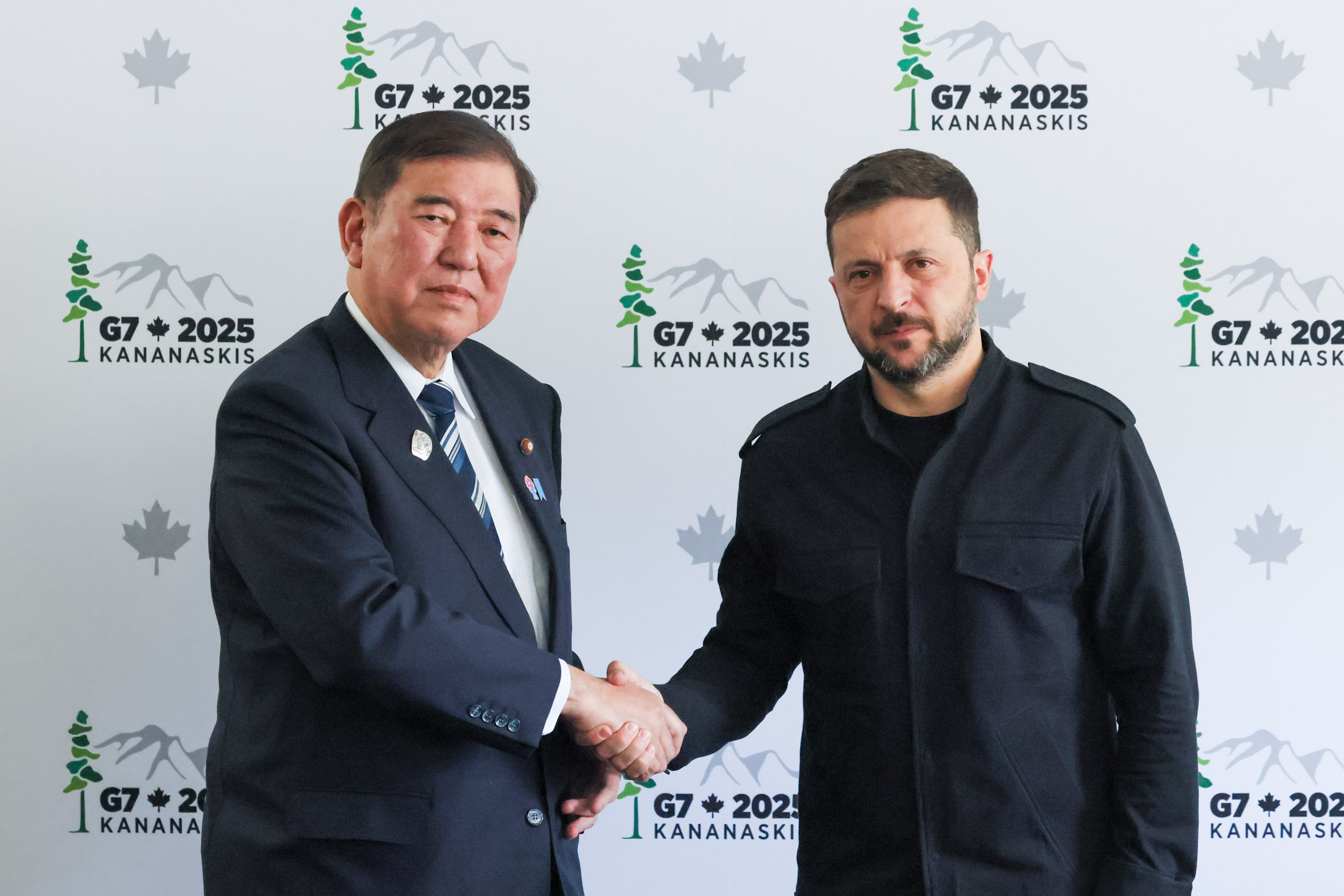
Ishiba meeting with Ukrainian President Volodymyr Zelenskyy on the sidelines of the G7 Summit, June 2025.

Similar to his predecessor Fumio Kishida, Ishiba has maintained support for Ukraine during the Russian invasion that began in 2022. In February 2025, Defense Minister Gen Nakatani revealed that the Japan Self-Defense Forces would provide approximately 30 additional transport vehicles to the Ukrainian military. After a heated argument between Ukrainian president Volodymyr Zelenskyy and Donald Trump and his vice president JD Vance during a meeting at the White House that was televised live on 28 February 2025, Ishiba stated that the meeting "took a somewhat unexpected turn and there appears to have been a very emotional exchange of words" and that Japan would "do all it can to prevent divisions between the United States and Ukraine." In March 2025, Japan adjusted its language on support for Ukraine from “strengthen” to "will maintain” support. The change was made to minimize the difference between Japanese and US policy. That same month, Japanese representatives participated in meetings of the Coalition of the Willing. After a meeting between Zelenskyy, several European leaders, and Trump at the White House in August 2025, Ishiba stated that the Japanese government would consider a potential role in providing security guarantees to Ukraine, as part of a wider peace agreement. In September 2025, Ishiba's government announced that the Foreign Ministry would be closing all six “Japan Centers” within the Russian Federation. Chief Cabinet Secretary Yoshimasa Hayashi cited the deterioration of relations between the two countries, among other issues, led to the closing of the centers. That same month the Japanese government expanded sanctions against Russia, primarily by freezing the assets of 14 individuals and 51 organizations, including company executives and pro-Russian figures.

==== Other issues ====
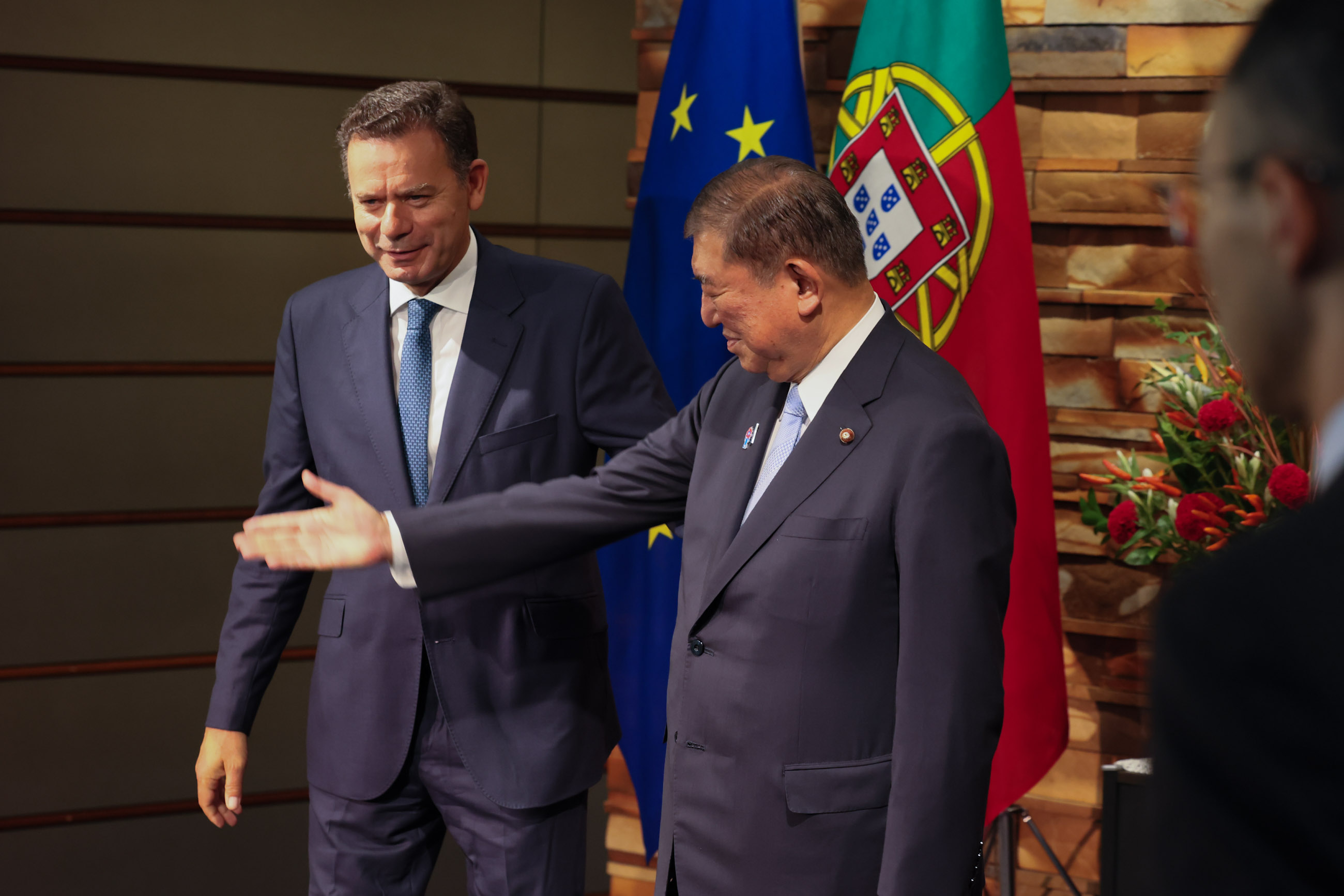
Ishiba with Portuguese Prime Minister Luís Montenegro, September 2025.

In February 2025, Ishiba said that the government would consider offering medical care for sick and wounded residents of the Gaza Strip, amidst Israel's war with Hamas that has been ongoing since October 2023. He also said that educational opportunities could be offered to people from Gaza. During his address to the United Nations General Assembly in September 2025, Ishiba stated Japanese recognition of a Palestinian state was a matter of 'when, not if'.

Defense Minister Nakatani announced in April 2025 that the Ministry of Defense would dispatch Japan Self-Defense Forces (JSDF) units to Myanmar as an international emergency relief team to support victims of a Japan Self-Defense Forces earthquake that struck on 28 March. JSDF jets helped transport medical devices and medicine to victims.

Ishiba attempted to broaden Japan's relationship with the North Atlantic Treaty Organization (NATO). He met with NATO Secretary-General Mark Rutte in April 2025, and affirmed that Euro-Atlantic and Indo-Pacific security were indivisible. Although he was scheduled to attend the June 2025 NATO summit in The Hague, Ishiba abruptly canceled his trip at the last minute due to "various circumstances." He dispatched Foreign Minister Takeshi Iwaya to represent Japan in his stead.

Several weeks following his announcement that he would resign as prime minister, Ishiba delivered an address to the United Nations General Assembly. During his speech, he criticized the Security Council for its inability to maintain peace around the globe, advocated for nuclear disarmament, and championed democratic values, decrying populism and authoritarianism as irresponsible and narrow-minded. The Diplomat considered it to be a fitting conclusion to Ishiba's tenure as prime minister.

=== Gift certificates scandal ===
On 13 March 2025, the Asahi Shimbun newspaper revealed that several LDP members of parliament who were elected for the first time in the 2024 general election received gift certificates from the office of Ishiba during a meal held ten days earlier on 3 March. Ishiba's office later confirmed that he had distributed gift certificates worth approximately ¥100,000 ($676) each to about a dozen lawmakers as "souvenirs” intended to be used to purchase new suits. Ishiba claimed the certificates were paid from his personal funds and were not intended for political activities but as a supplement for living expenses.

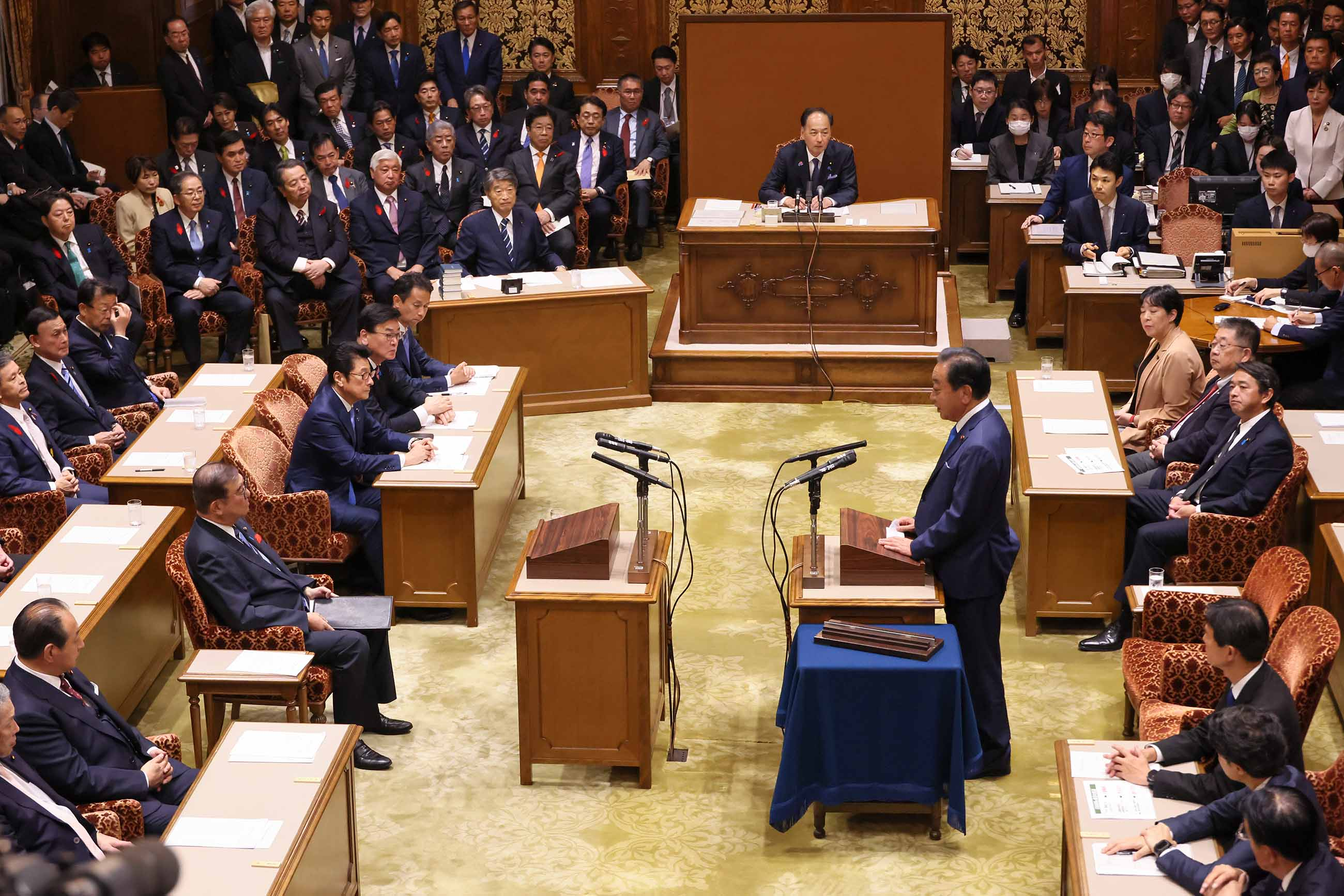
Constitutional Democratic Party leader Yoshihiko Noda (right) criticized Ishiba for the gift certificate scandal.

According to the Yomiuri Shimbun, most of the lawmakers decided to return the gift certificates instead of using them. The incident took place while discussions were underway in the Diet on the transparency of political funds, particularly regarding corporate and organizational donations. Ishiba had met with Komeito Chief Representative Tetsuo Saito the day before, who pledged his party's support for him; earlier in the week upper house LDP lawmaker Shoji Nishida publicly stated that Ishiba should be replaced by a new party president. Former LDP leadership rival Takayuki Kobayashi criticized Ishiba over the scandal, saying that it would be hard for the public to understand the position and that such an incident should not happen again.

Ishiba, who was elected as LDP President on a reformist platform, was widely criticized by opposition lawmakers. CDP leader Yoshihiko Noda, who said he never received or offered such vouchers during his time in government, expressed disappointment in Ishiba and promised to pursue inquiries over the incident in the Diet. Osaka Prefecture Governor and Japan Innovation Party co-leader Hirofumi Yoshimura criticized Ishiba's actions. The Political Funds Control Act prohibits donations of cash or securities to individual politicians; the 100,000 yen in gift certificates in this case could have been considered a 'donation’ in this case. The meal itself cost ¥15,000 per each of the 15 invited lawmakers, and was also paid out of Ishiba's own pocket. He denied violating the Public Offices Election Act or Political Funds Control Act. Ishiba claimed he had received similar vouchers when he was a younger lawmaker, and emphasized the lawmakers returned the vouchers to avoid negative perceptions, given the slush fund scandal that broke the year earlier. Ishiba apologized for his actions in the Political Ethics Hearing Committee and the Budget Committee of the House of Representatives. LDP Secretary-General Hiroshi Moriyama stated on 24 March that the party had no plans to investigate the incident. Ishiba also said he had no interest in determining if the practice was common among previous administrations. Throughout March and April, members of the opposition threatened to introduce no-confidence motions against Ishiba's government, but these never materialized. Ultimately no investigations related to the scandal were pursued.

=== 2025 Upper House elections ===
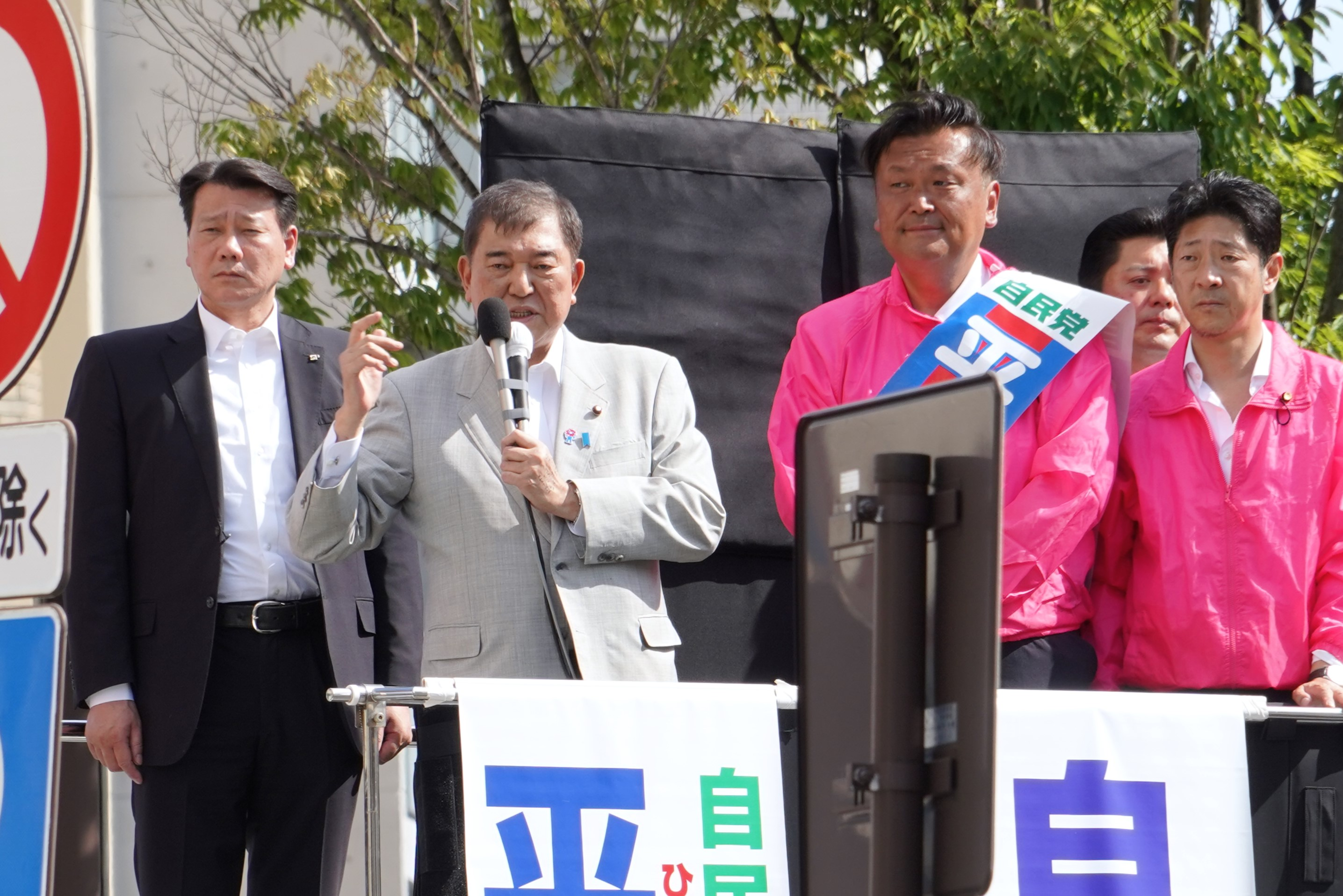
Ishiba delivering a speech in Tokyo, 21 June 2025

The 2025 Japanese House of Councillors election was scheduled to take place on 20 July 2025. At the LDP’s party convention on 9 March, Ishiba said the party should aim to unify and return to its roots of “people-friendly politics.” The day earlier Ishiba stated he wanted to “win at all costs.” Ishiba's speech was criticized by members of his party's far-right. Low approval ratings had hampered Ishiba's governmened, supported by the coalition between the LDP and Komeito. Having already lost the LDP's majority in the lower house election in October 2024, the upper house election was seen as a crucial test for Ishiba's leadership.

The campaign took place amidst ongoing negotiations with the Trump administration regarding tariffs levied against Japanese imports, which unsettled the economy. Many Japanese also remained concerned about more immediate economic issues, including inflation and stagnant wages. Ishiba, maintained an optimistic public stance, assuring voters that the trade negotiations would ultimately succeed and produce a fair outcome for Japan. To help combat a surge in rice prices, Ishiba appointed popular reformist Shinjiro Koizumi, the son of a former prime minister and former cabinet minister in his own right, as Agriculture Minister in May 2025. Koizumi attempted to alleviate consumer concerns by encouraging more rice production and utilizing reserve stockpiles. The rice crisis would become a major issue in the election.

The LDP-Komeito coalition lost its majority in the Upper House, losing 18 seats. Parties like the CDP and DPFP, as well as the far-right nationalist Sanseitō party, made gains. After the election, Ishiba again invoked a parliamentary plurality in the upper houses, and believed the LDP had a responsibility to lead the government, as it would in most other parliamentary democracies. Shortly after the polls closed on 20 July 2025, members began to openly question whether Ishiba should remain as the head of the party and prime minister. Among them was former prime minister Tarō Asō, whom stated he "couldn't accept" Ishiba remaining as prime minister. Ishiba said in a post-election press conference that the LDP "received an extremely harsh judgment from the people", and said the loss could be attributed to "political reform, inflation, [and] foreigner-related issues" and a failure to "present sharp, impactful policies to the voters". Ishiba also said he felt "the grave responsibility for the results of this election", but had no plans to resign, saying he "must continue to fulfill my duties to the nation and its people so as not to bring politics to a standstill".

=== Resignation ===
==== Calls to step down ====
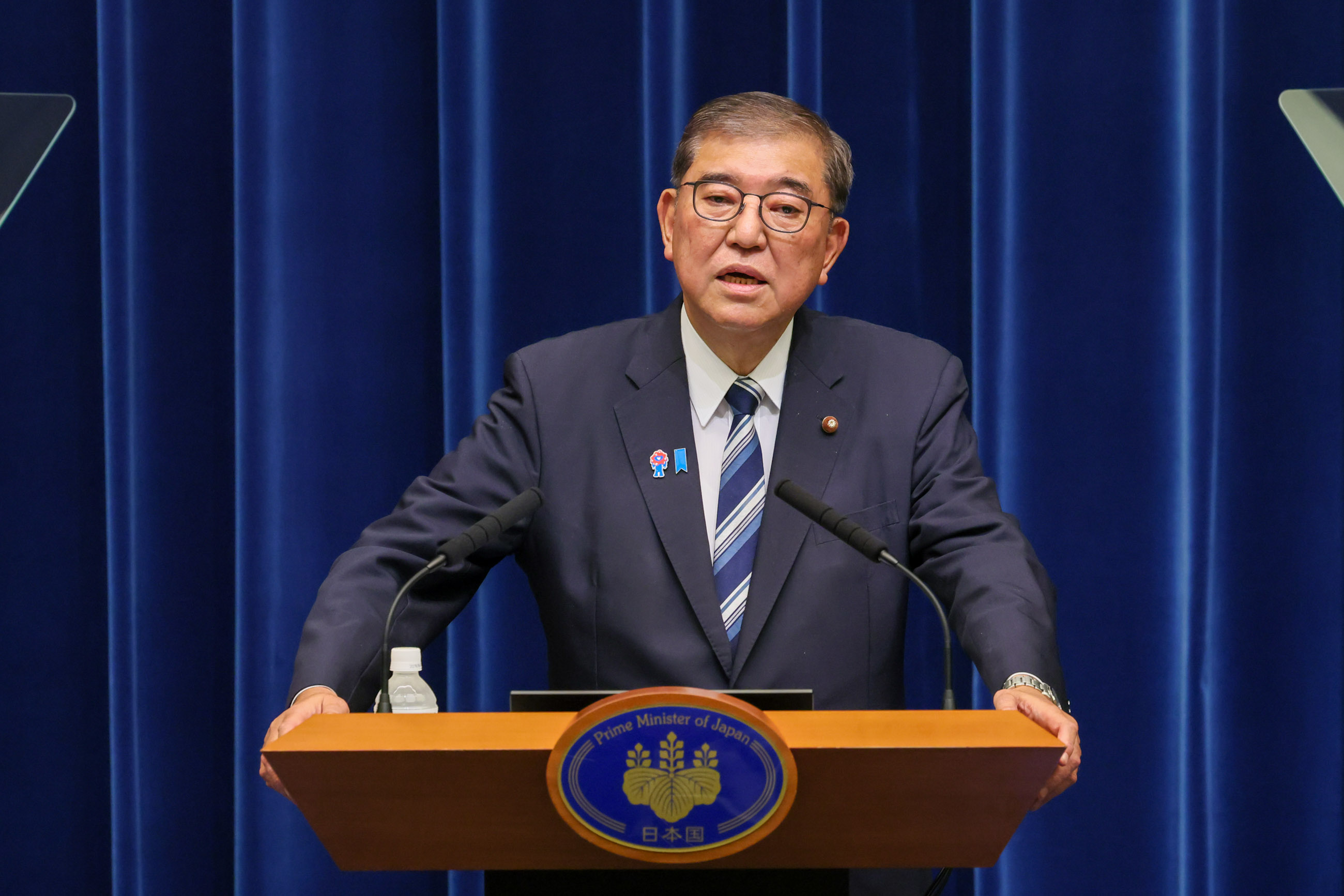
Ishiba announced his intention to resign as Prime Minister on 7 September 2025

Following the election, Ishiba said that he would continue in office as prime minister, planning to remain in office until after tariff negotiations with the United States were completed. On 23 July 2025, the Mainichi Shimbun and the Sankei Shimbun reported that Ishiba planned to formally resign as Prime Minister and LDP President in late August, after the 80th Anniversary of the end of World War II. Jiji Press reported that an unnamed senior LDP leadership member indicated that Ishiba would step down after the party conducted its review of the election results in August. After a trade deal between the US and Japan was announceed on 22 July, it was falsely reported the following day that Ishiba would resign at the end of August. However, at a press conference at the LDP headquarters later that same day, Ishiba denied the reports. An opinion poll released on 22 July saw public approval ratings for Ishiba's government decrease to 23%, the lowest since it took office. Despite ishiba's personal approval rising, appetite within the party for a change of leadership continued to grow.

Pressure continued to mount on Ishiba to resign as LDP president, but he refused and said he planned to continue serving as prime minister. Mid-career and junior members of the LDP, primarily members and former members of the Motegi faction, began collecting signatures to call for the early convening of a joint meeting of the party representing both houses of parliament. On 6 August, Ishiba ordered an investigation into political party branches over corporate donations, which prompted criticism from within the party. During a joint plenary session on 8 August, the LDP decided that it would determine whether or not to move forward with an "emergency presidential election” based on opinions by lawmakers and prefectural branch chiefs. During the meeting, Ishiba repeated his intention to stay in office.

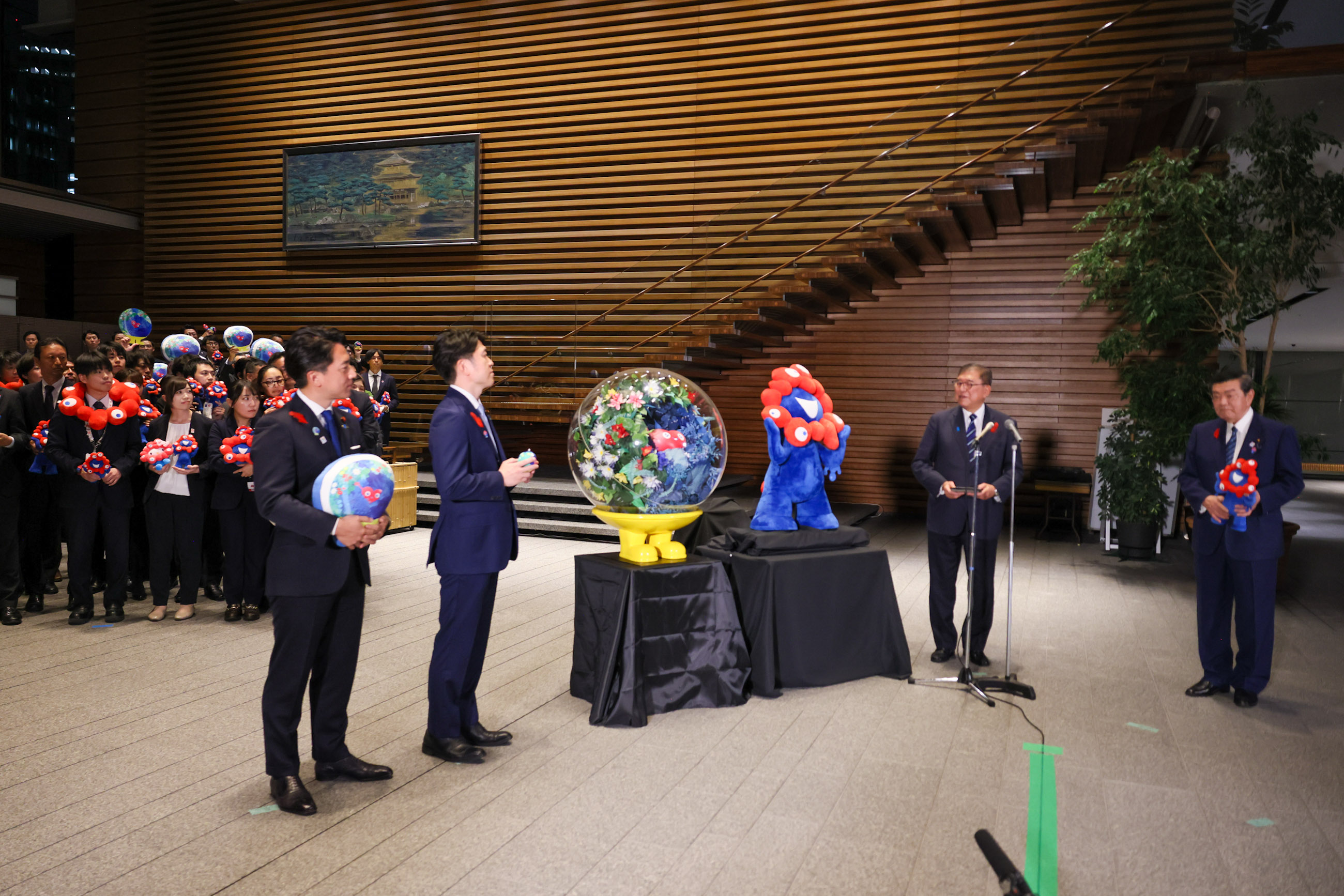
Agriculture Minister Shinjiro Koizumi (far left) reportedly pressured Ishiba to step down as Prime Minister the night before he announced his resignation. Koizumi later denied this.

Various members of Ishiba's cabinet voiced support for the prime minister, including Chief Cabinet Secretary Yoshimasa Hayashi, Digital Minister Masaaki Taira, Economic Revitalization Minister Ryosei Akazawa, Defense Minister Gen Nakatani, and Foreign Minister Takeshi Iwaya. Other cabinet ministers, such as Agriculture Minister Shinjiro Koizumi, remained ambiguous. However, various junior cabinet ministers threatened to resign in order to force an emergency leadership election. Protests supporting Ishiba and calling for his resignation were held outside the Kantei throughout the summer.As August came to close, it was becoming clear that while the LDP's party approval had fallen, Ishiba Cabinet approval had increased. On 2 September, two deputy ministers announced their resignations from the government; by now several notable lawmakers were calling for an emergency leadership election. That same day, three senior party executives, including secretary-general Hiroshi Moriyama resigned their positions seemingly simultaneously.

On the evening of 5 September, Ishiba met with Foreign Minister Iwatake and Minister of Internal Affairs and Communications Seiichiro Murakami, at a hotel in Tokyo. Earlier that day, Minister of Justice Keisuke Suzuki became the first cabinet minister to support an early presidential election." Ishiba had reportedly threatened to ask the Emperor to dissolve the House of Representatives and call a general election. Sankei wrote that Ishiba had been threatened with expulsion from the party if he attempted to dissolve the House for an election, a possibility that “shocked” him. Following weeks of infighting within the LDP, Ishiba announced his intention to resign as party president and prime minister on 7 September. The previous night, he was visited by Yoshihide Suga and Shinjirō Koizumi, who reportedly urged him to resign. Ishiba stated he sought to claim "responsibility" as party leader for losses in recent elections, and to avoid dividing the party. Ishiba said he determined now was the "appropriate time" to step aside, after a written version of the Japan–U.S. tariff agreement had been finalized. During his resignation announcement, Ishiba warned Japan could fall into a “casual populism” if the LDP loses credibility, and said the party would have no future if it’s viewed as “the same old party”.

==== Succession ====
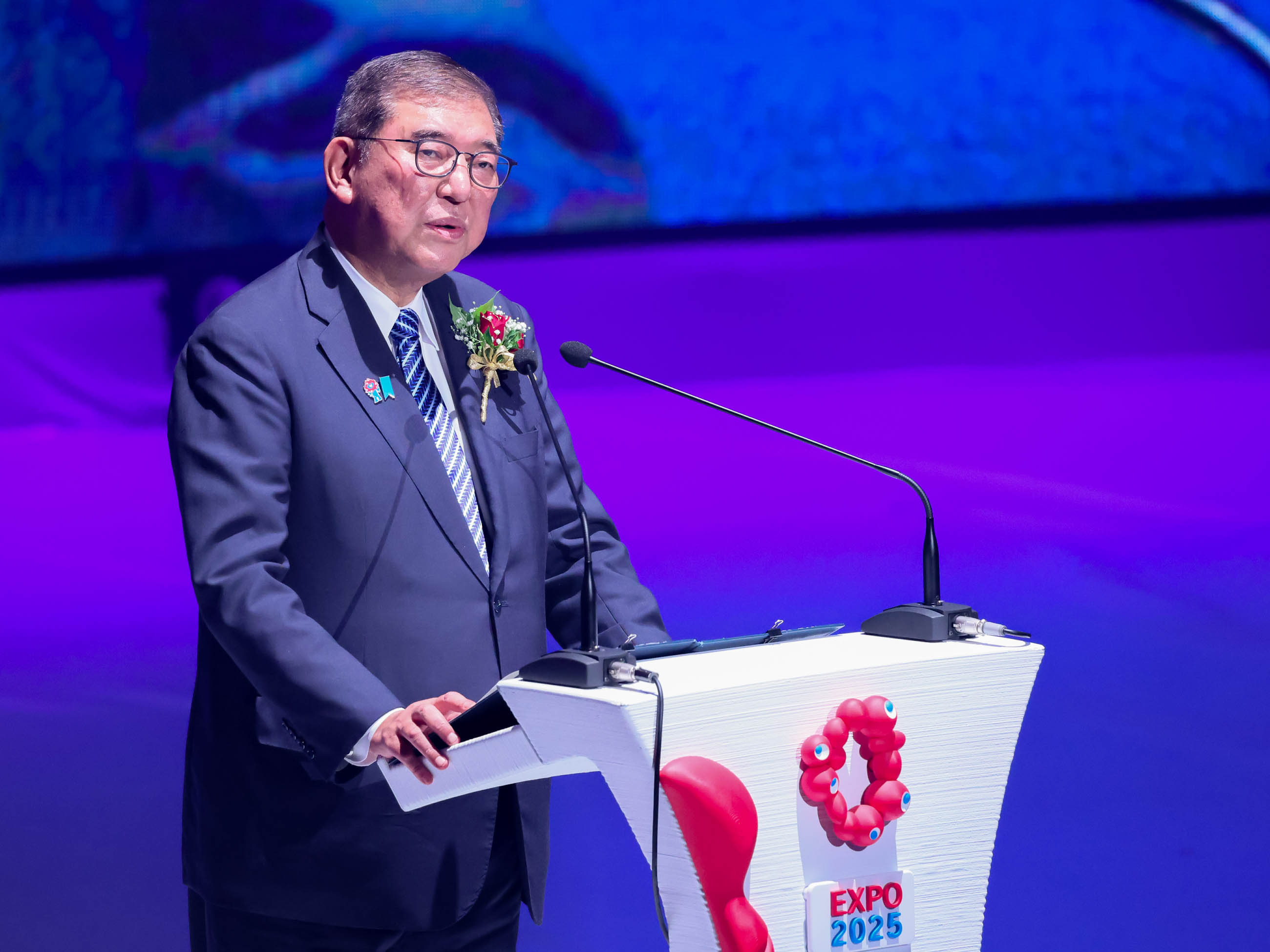
Ishiba speaking at the closing ceremony for the 2025 Osaka World Expo. The conclusion of the expo in October 2025 coincided with the end of Ishiba's tenure as Prime Minister.

Ishiba's resignation triggered a snap presidential election within the LDP. Ishiba clarified that he had “no problems” with cabinet ministers seeking the presidency, and would not attempt to block anyone from doing so. Chief Cabinet Secretary Yoshimasa Hayashi and Agriculture Minister Shinjiro Koizumi would both announce their leadership campaigns in the weeks following Ishiba's resignation announcement. Both had run against Ishiba in the previous leadership election. Sanae Takaichi, who Ishiba defeated in the previous leadership election, also announced her own campaign. Hayashi pledged to continue the work started by the Kishida and Ishiba administrations, running as a continuity candidate while embracing some policies of his own. Ishiba later implied he thought Koizumi, with whom he held similar policy beliefs, was a suitable successor. At the start of the campaign, only Koizumi praised Ishiba, while Hayashi said he would seek continuity between Ishiba and his own ministry. Ishiba stated on 23 September that he hoped his successor would be someone who served in his government and would continue his policies. On 3 October, Koizumi and Takaichi advanced to the final round of the election. Takaichi would be victorious in runoff defeating Koizumi and becoming President of the LDP on the same day. She became the party's first woman leader. Koizumi's own father, Junichiro, reportedly told Ishiba at a dinner following the election that his son did not consult with him on running for party leader, and admitted he still believed Shinjiro was too young to become prime minister.

Takaichi's election as party leader troubled the Komeito, the Buddhist centrist conservative party that had been in coalition with the LDP since 2012. On 10 October, Komeito Chief Representative Tetsuo Saito announced they would split off from the LDP's coalition and stated their members would not vote to confirm Takaichi as prime minister, citing her unwillingness to fully address the LDP's handling of the slush fund scandal as well as her senior party position appointments. This complicated Takaichi's election as prime minister, and prolonged Ishiba's tenure as the date for the prime ministerial election in the Diet was being repeatedly postponed. On 19 October, it was announced that the LDP and the Japan Innovation Party agreed to form a coalition, and support Takaichi as prime minister.

== Post-premiership (2025–present) ==
Ishiba retired from the position of prime minister on October 21, 2025. He was succeeded by Sanae Takaichi, who was confirmed to be the prime minister-designate after garnering a majority of votes in the lower house of the Diet. She became the country's first female prime minister following her appointment by Emperor Naruhito at the Tokyo Imperial Palace. Following his resigantion as Prime Minister, Ishiba continued in the House of Representatives as a backbencher and returned to his home constituency in Tottori.

=== Analysis of tenure ===
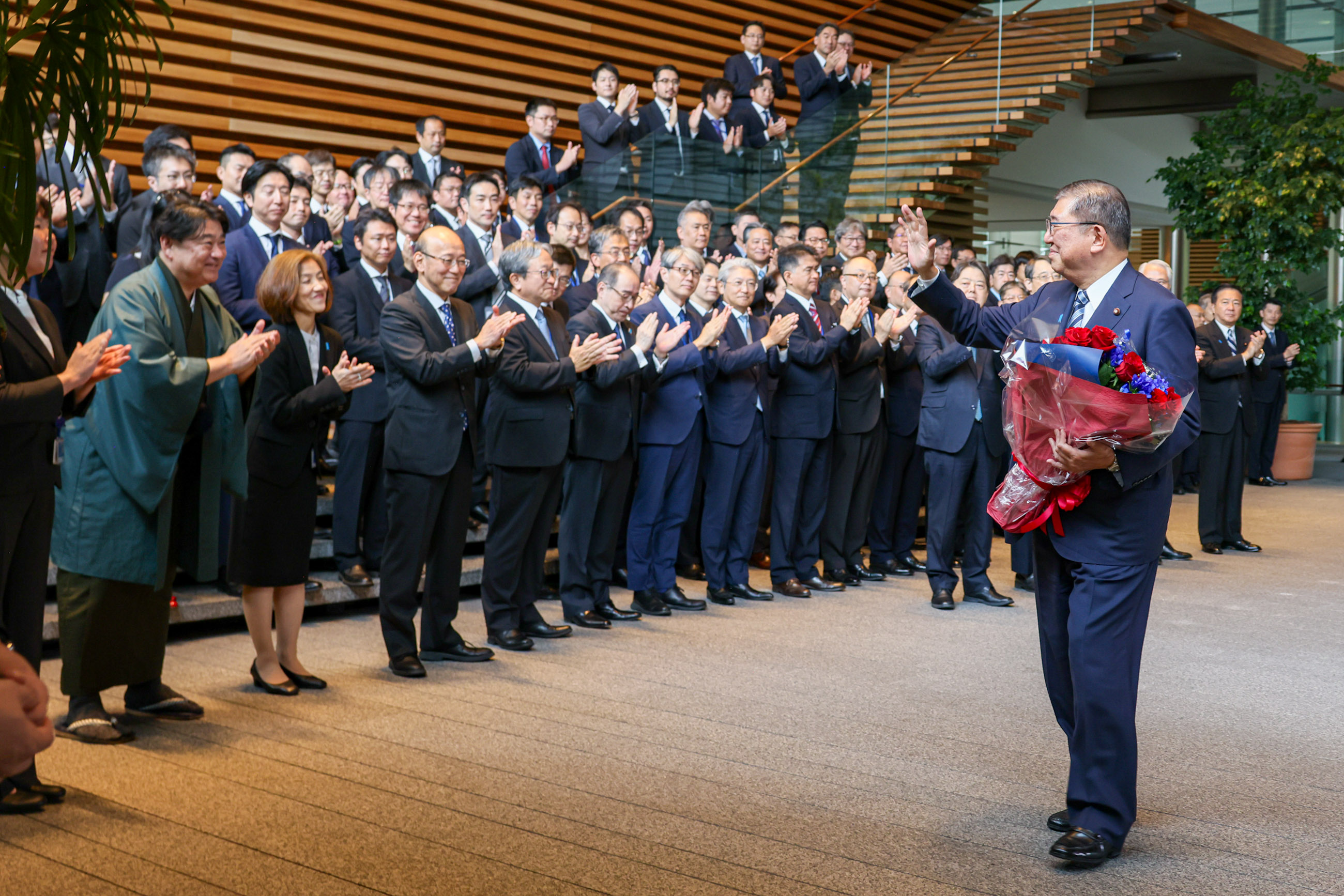
Ishiba departs from the Prime Minister's Office as prime minister for the last time

Ishiba's distance from the right-wing faction of the LDP was originally seen as advantageous, given the party's various scandals. Time magazine described Ishiba's resignation as “a long time coming” given the majorities lost in both houses of the National Diet, describing him as the third “revolving door” Prime Minister following Shinzo Abe, the others being Yoshihide Suga and Fumio Kishida. The magazine described Japan's relationship with the United States under Trump as “a particular challenge for Ishiba” during his tenure. Financial Times wrote that Ishiba's departure was “indicative of a more fundamental challenge for the Liberal Democratic party” and noted it laid bare a “a rift emerging between a moderate centre-right wing associated with reform and a conservative element that takes a revisionist view of history and whose rhetoric occasionally strays into xenophobia” within the party. Kenneth Weinstein of the Hudson Institute criticized Ishiba as “someone who was unable to offer either Washington or his own country a deep vision of Japan’s role in the world.” Tobias Harris of Japan Foresight remarked, “The unforgivable sin of Ishiba was that he allowed himself to be trapped by inaction.” The Japan Times described Ishiba's resignation as the LDP’s ‘internal coup’, arguing that “Shigeru Ishiba never really had a chance to succeed as prime minister, facing a fractured party, entrenched rivals and unfavorable political conditions that made his resignation inevitable.”

Takeshi Iwaya, who served as foreign minister under Ishiba, was critical of what he described as an "ousting", stating it represented a lack of recognition of the "harsh political situation" among fellow LDP lawmakers. Outgoing Minister for Internal Affairs and Communications Seiichiro Murakami described Ishiba's resignation as “extremely regrettable” and insisted Ishiba had not failed in any policy area.

=== Activities ===
Ishiba ran in the 2026 general election, called by Takaichi to take place on 8 February. Ishiba was victorious in his home constituency of Tottori 1st, securing more than 65% of the vote. In the same month, Ishiba criticized Takaichi's government on various issues, particularly a proposed anti-espionage law and her handling of deliberations on revising Article 9 of the Constitution.

Ishiba served as Chief Attendant to Emperor Naruhito and Empress Masako during their state visits to Belgium and the Netherlands in June 2026.

== Political positions ==
Ishiba has been described as a centrist, a moderate conservative, and a reformist, particularly during the 2024 Liberal Democratic Party presidential election. While he was cited as a member of the ultranationalist far-right organisation Nippon Kaigi, he has been criticized by nationalist commentators for his "traitorous acts", and for being "anti-Japan", and has pointed to Japan's failure to face its war responsibilities as underlying "many of its problems".

=== Social views ===
Ishiba has expressed support for introducing a selective dual surname system, which would allow married couples the option to retain their respective surnames. Ishiba has stated that this change should be subject to further discussion within the LDP to reach a consensus. In his book, Conservative Politician (2024) he has expressed his support for same-sex marriage in Japan: "From the perspective of guaranteeing fundamental human rights, as long as there are citizens whose rights are being obstructed, it is necessary to enact legislation as soon as possible, without having to wait for the Supreme Court's decision."

However, after becoming prime minister, Ishiba stated he would take relevant court rulings into consideration since the country's constitution regulated marriages. On 17 December 2024, Prime Minister Shigeru Ishiba made the following statement about same-sex marriage during a parliamentary session: “I have met concerned individuals, and I can see that being together is the most precious thing to them. While there is no ‘scale’ for measuring the national happiness, I believe that fulfilling these deepest wishes would have a positive and beneficial impact on the overall well-being of Japan".

In a 2004 speech to the Japanese Self-Defense Forces (SDF), Ishiba, then Director General of the Japan Defense Agency, said that the SDF "has sometimes been made fun of as the 'autistic forces.' It's the autistic forces as in autistic children." The remark was apparently intended as a pun, as the word he used for "autistic forces" (自閉隊, Jihei-tai) sounds similar to the word for Self-Defence Forces (自衛隊; Jiei-tai). The comment was meant to criticize the SDF for their poor communication, which resulted in a lack of public understanding about their activities.

His comment was criticized as being inappropriate and showing a lack of awareness of autistic people. Ishiba later apologized for the comparison, saying "I had read an article that had such a reference, but (my remarks) were truly inappropriate", and added: "It is an undeniable fact that my remarks have hurt relevant parties, and I sincerely apologize. I will have to reflect (on my actions) and caution myself against repeating such an act."

=== Economic policy ===
As a representative for a rural district in Tottori Prefecture (with the smallest population among the forty-seven prefectures) and former "Minister in charge of Overcoming Population Decline and Vitalizing Local Economy", Ishiba regularly emphasized the need to address socioeconomic inequality between Japan's urban centers and rural areas, the latter of which faces population decline, aging demographics, and economic stagnation. On election night, Ishiba called on the LDP to propose a supplementary budget for the 2024 fiscal year, aimed at financing a stimulus package to help rural areas cope with rising costs.

Ishiba intends to maintain the economic policies under Kishida's premiership to steer Japan out of years of deflation. He has called for a more "fair" tax system and seeks to increase taxes such as the capital gains tax. He believes the economy can only improve if consumption increases and stated his commitment to raising the minimum wage to 1,500 yen per hour by the end of the decade.

=== Foreign policy ===
During the 2013 North Korean crisis, Ishiba stated that Japan had the right to deliver a preemptive strike against North Korea. Ishiba is a vocal supporter of Taiwanese democracy. At the same time, he has called for stronger diplomacy and engagement with China, rather than antagonism.

In his memoir written during the Russian invasion of Ukraine, Ishiba argued that equating the Russian invasion with a potential Chinese attack on Taiwan stems more from emotional reactions rather than a pragmatic evaluation of the Chinese threat. Ishiba has criticized Fumio Kishida's use of the phrase "Ukraine today may be East Asia tomorrow". In 2024, he stated that the reason the US did not defend Ukraine is that Ukraine is not part of a collective self-defense system like NATO. Ishiba argued that the war transformed the global security environment and with the absence of such a collective self-defense system in Asia, wars are more likely to break out in the region as there is no obligation for mutual defense. He therefore stated that an Asian collective security alliance is necessary in order to deter China.

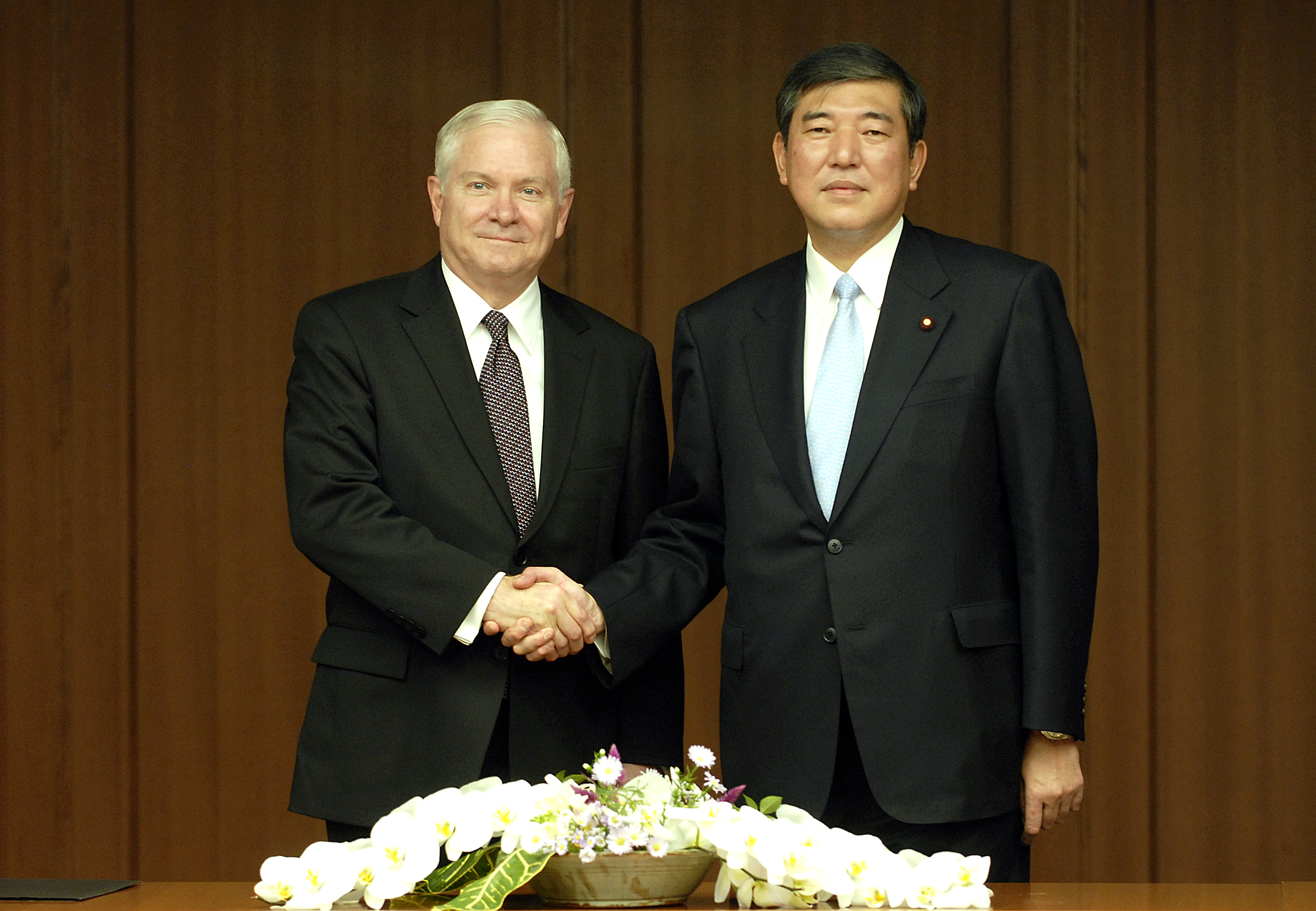
Ishiba and US Defense Secretary Robert Gates in November 2007

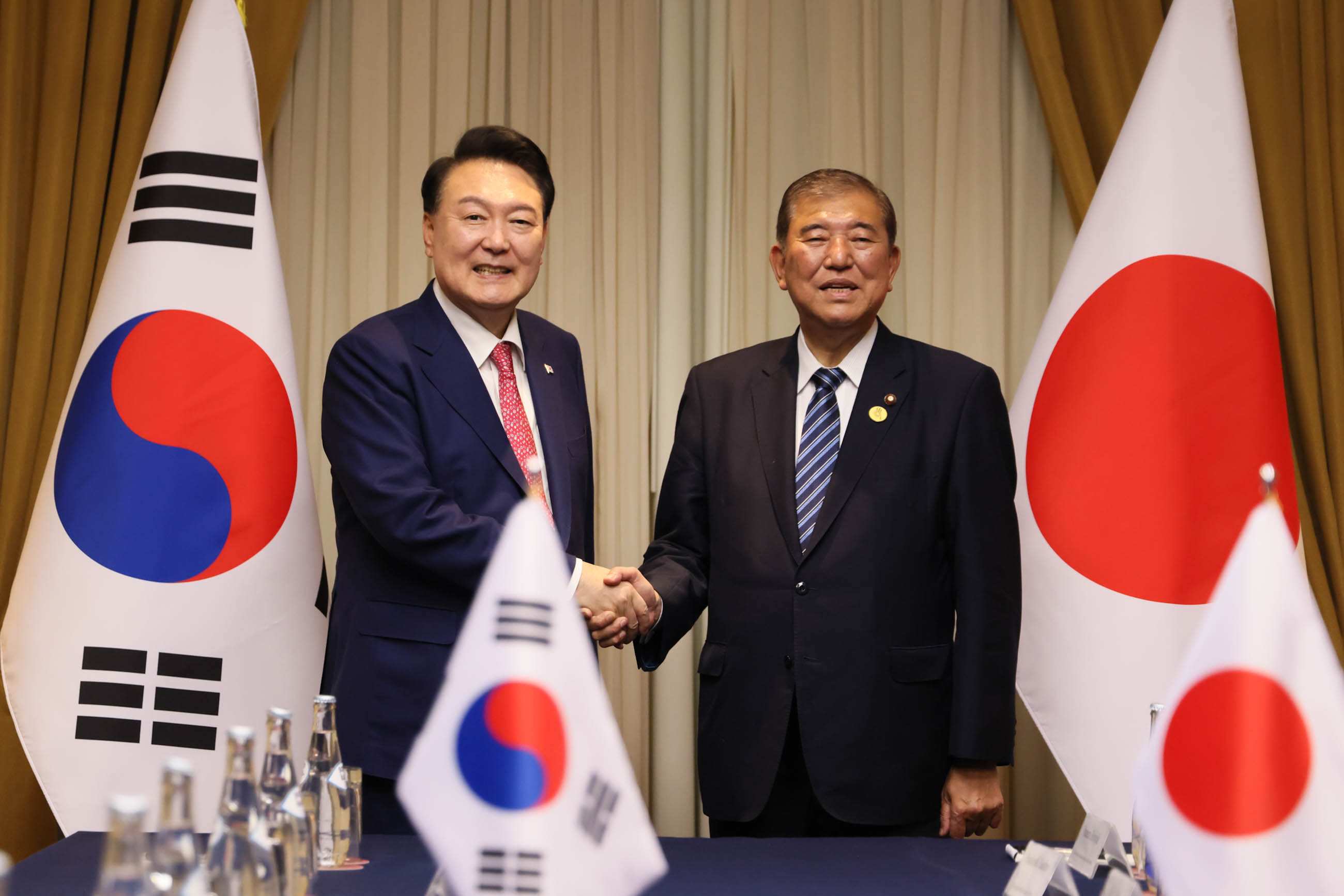
Ishiba with South Korean President Yoon Suk-yeol in November 2024

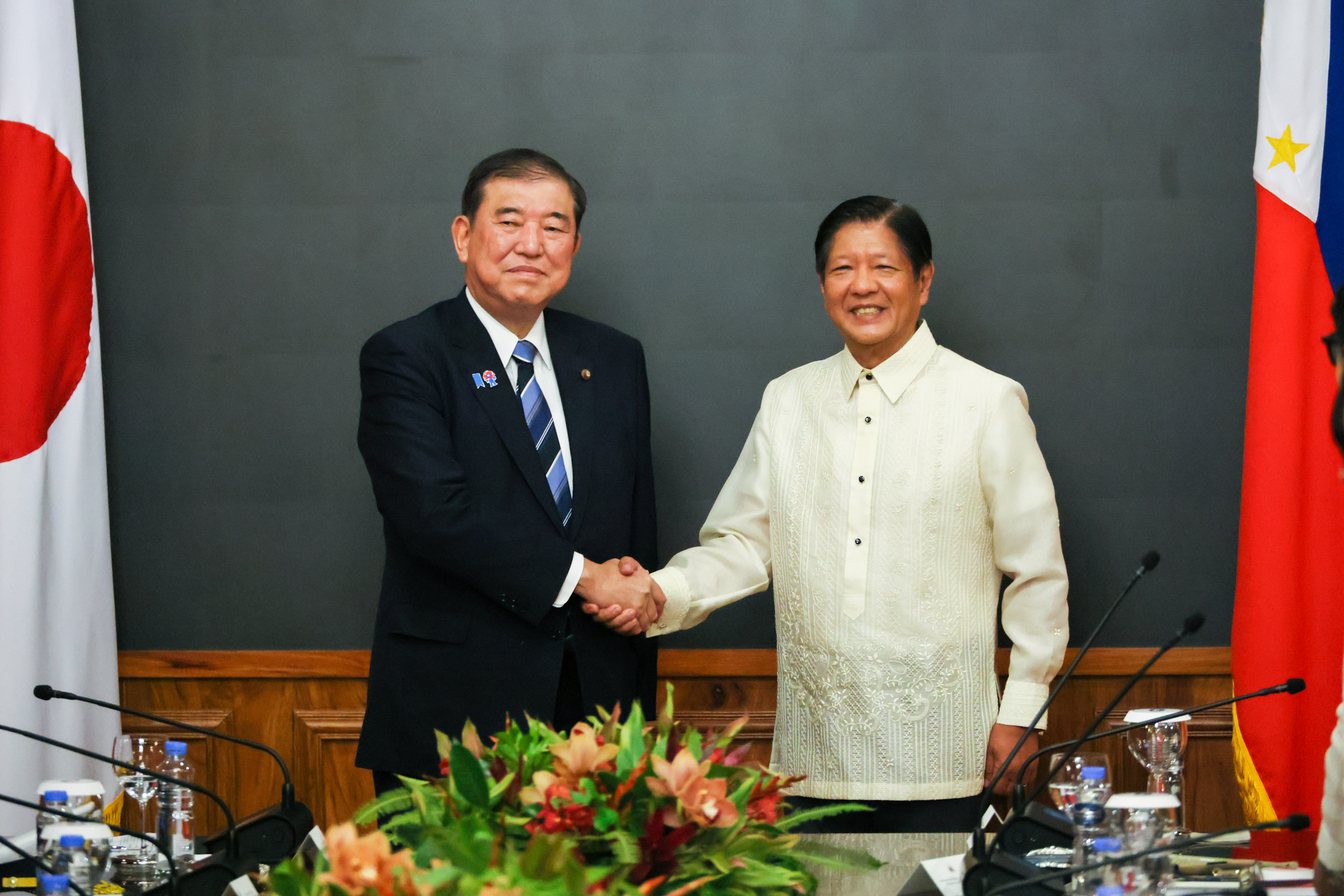
Ishiba with Philippine President Bongbong Marcos at the Malacañang Palace during an official visit to Manila in April 2025

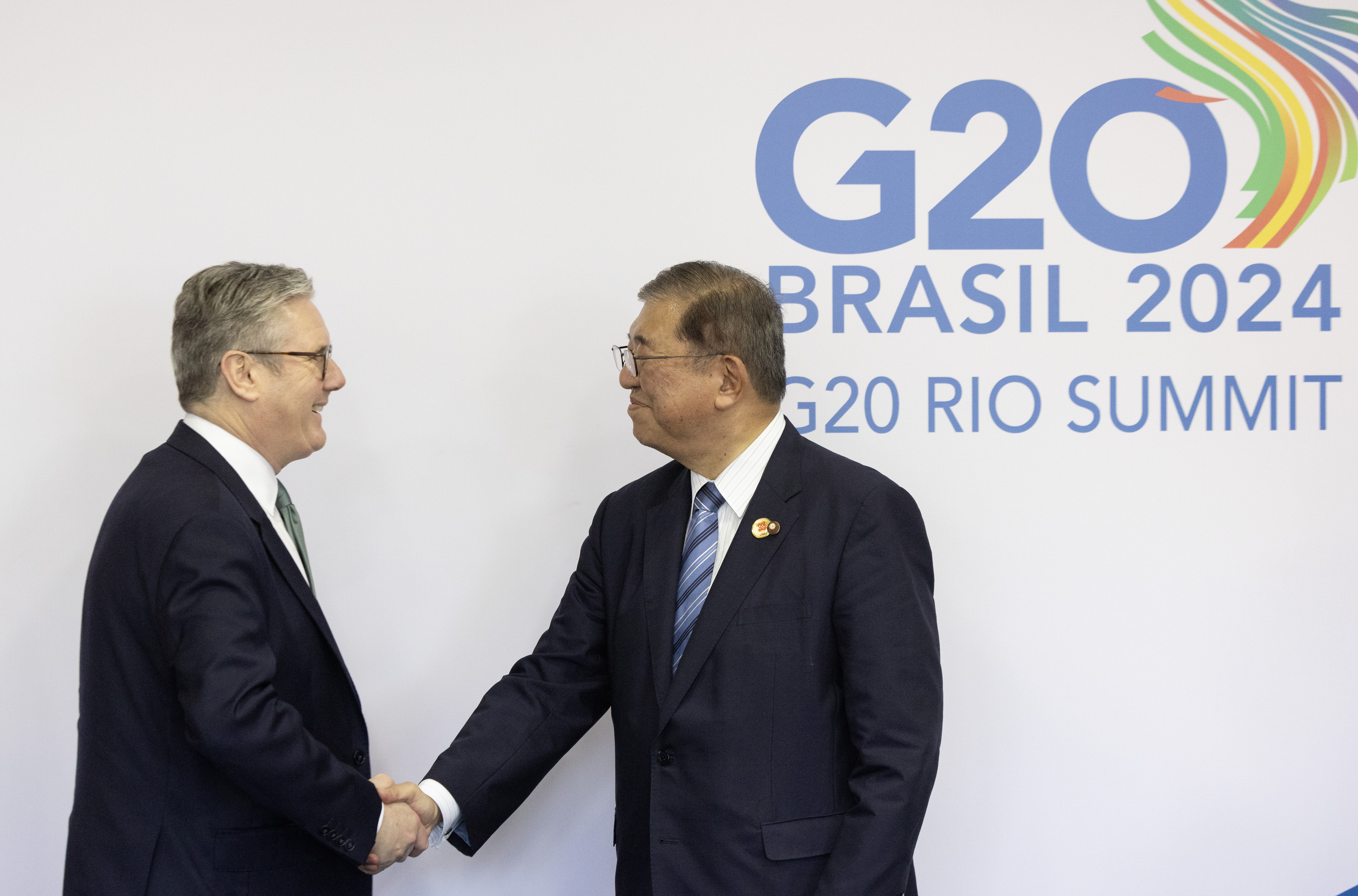
Ishiba and British Prime Minister Keir Starmer at the 2024 G20 Rio de Janeiro summit

==== "Asian NATO" and US-Japan alliance ====
In September 2024, Ishiba claimed that the "relative decline of U.S. might" necessitates an Asian version of NATO to counter security threats from China, Russia, and North Korea. With the US-Japan alliance at its core, Ishiba proposed strengthening alliance relationships with Australia, Canada, the Philippines, India, France, the United Kingdom, and South Korea in order to form this "Asian NATO". He said that one of the policy's main goals is to protect Japan and that "the security environment surrounding us is the toughest since the end of World War II." This proposed security alliance was quickly dismissed by Daniel Kritenbrink, the United States Assistant Secretary of State for East Asian and Pacific Affairs. Indian External Affairs Minister Subrahmanyam Jaishankar also does not agree with Ishiba's idea for an Asian NATO as it does not fit with India's strategic goals.

In response to Ishiba's comments regarding an Asian version of NATO, Ministry of Foreign Affairs of China spokesperson Lin Jian stated that "China hopes that Japan will learn from history, follow a path of peaceful development, abide by the principles and common understandings established in the four political documents between the two sides [China and Japan], have an objective and right perception of China, take active and rational China policy, take concrete efforts to comprehensively advance the strategic relationship of mutual benefit, and work with China to promote the sustained, sound and steady development of China-Japan relations."

The Jakarta Post criticized the idea, claiming that it is aimed at "unifying all available forces to band together against China, which would be considered very offensive for the 10-member ASEAN". During his first visit to Laos as prime minister, Ishiba did not mention anything related to the Asian NATO idea to reporters. On 11 March 2025, Slovenian foreign minister Tanja Fajon remarked during a visit to Manila that the Asian NATO idea is a way to go if it provides security in a peaceful manner and said "any initiative that promotes security, peace and solidarity among the countries in the region is a step in the right direction".

While campaigning, Ishiba stated that Japan's alliance with the US, which he referred to as asymmetrical, should be re-balanced and called for greater Japanese oversight of American military bases in Japan. He said Japan should use the Special Relationship between the US, UK and France as a model for creating an alliance with the US as equal partners. To become an equal partner, he said Japan must have its own military strategy and a "security system that can protect its own nation by itself". He also suggested that Japan Self-Defense Forces could be placed in Guam to strengthen the deterrence capabilities of the Japan-US alliance.

On his first call as prime minister with President Joe Biden, Ishiba said that he wants to further strengthen the U.S.–Japan Alliance. However, he did not mention his desire to make changes to the bilateral forces agreement that would be required in order to make the alliance more symmetrical. He said that he would find the chance to raise the issue with Biden in the future.

==== Historical awareness and Yasukuni Shrine ====
Following his victory in the 2024 LDP presidential election, some South Korean media outlets have described Ishiba as a "dove" in regards to his perception of Japan's accountability in World War II. For example, in 2019 when South Korea decided to terminate the General Security of Military Information Agreement (GSOMIA) during the Japan–South Korea trade dispute, Ishiba stated that root of many of the problems between Japan and South Korea is Japan's failure to face up to its wartime responsibility. However, in October 2024, Ishiba sent a ritual offering to Yasukuni Shrine, which drew criticism from South Korea.

Ishiba has criticised Japan and its government during World War II, stating that "The government concluded that Japan was doomed to lose a war, yet entered it anyway. They should be held accountable for that", and similarly saying that "I cannot understand why their actions that led to the defeat of Japan, without giving accurate answers to Emperor Shōwa's questions and without informing the public of the truth, are being left unquestioned as 'we are all heroes once we die.'"

He said of the Tokyo Trials that, regardless of the issues in retroactively applying law, Japan is what it is because they "accepted the trials". He stated that the Tokyo Trials did not condemn everything in pre-war Japan as wrong, and that those who argue the Trials were invalid due to the retroactively applying law argue that there were no mistakes in pre-war Japan at all. He argued there was both wrong and right in the pre-war era.

Regarding the Nanjing Massacre, Ishiba said: "At the very least, the way prisoners of war were treated was incorrect, and military discipline was broken. We must also examine the civilian casualties which happened." He has refrained from using the word massacre to describe it. When it comes to comfort women, he has stated there was "coercion in the narrow sense", clarifying he meant forced abduction by the government and military.

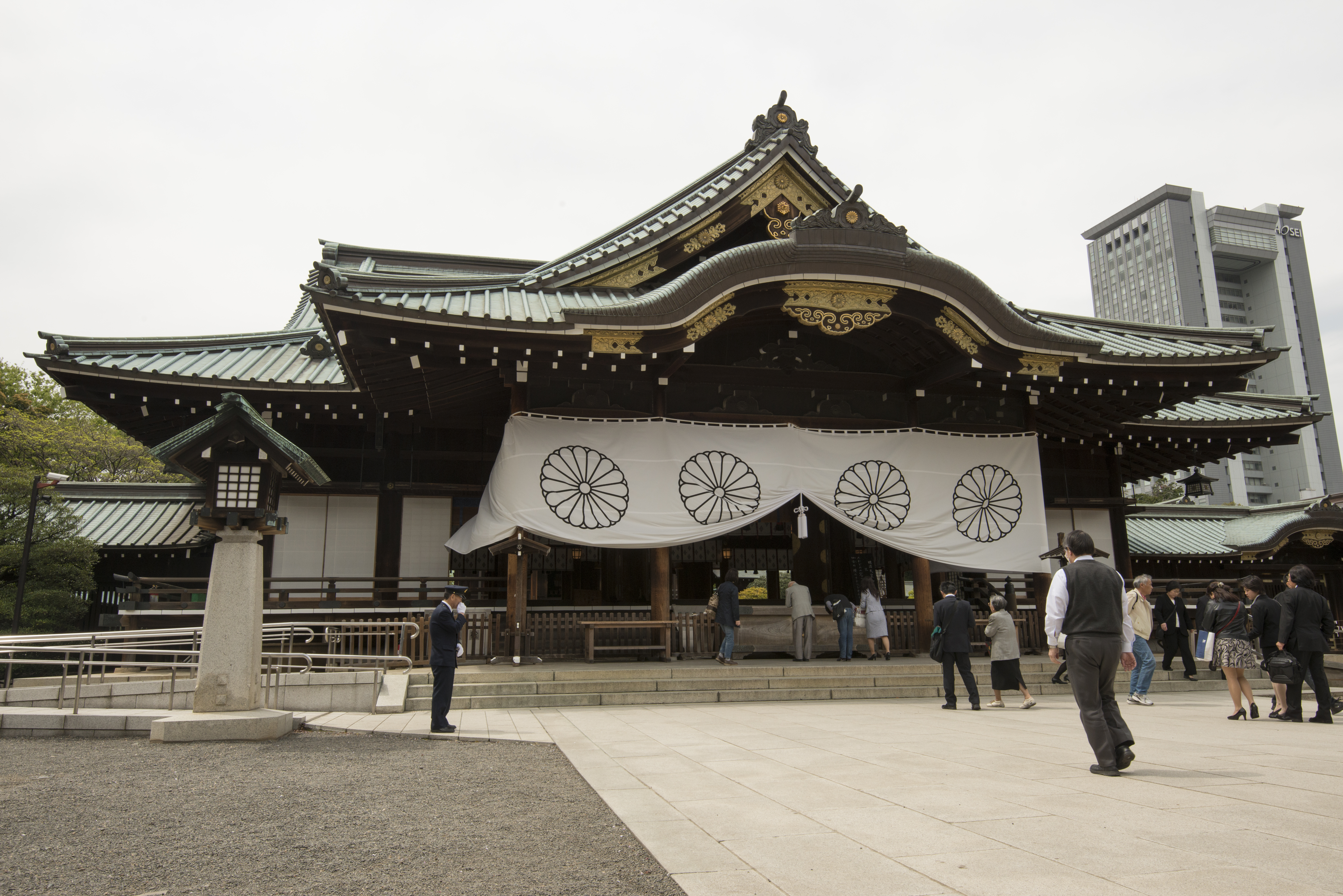
Yasukuni Shrine in Tokyo

Regarding visits to Yasukuni Shrine, which honors Japan's war dead, including convicted Japanese war criminals, by state officials and statements rejecting the Japanese war crimes during World War II, he has questioned if this is in national interest, citing incidents where countries such as South Korea have become upset at the nation for rejecting responsibility for World War II and Japanese colonisation. He has argued there is no need for active politicians to visit Yasukuni shrine, citing that it is the emperor's responsibility to visit the dead. He has said that it is particularly inappropriate for a prime minister to visit the Yasukuni Shrine due to concerns from China and South Korea.

Ishiba has criticized visits by politicians as not essential to creating an environment where laws can be passed. Ishiba has not visited the shrine since he gained his first cabinet post in 2002. He instead visits his local Gokoku Shrines every 15 August. He is also an advocate of separating Class A war criminals from the shrine. He has defended the Murayama Statement, commenting after Sanae Takaichi said she felt uncomfortable with the statement in 2013 that he would like the party to "refrain from making misleading statements".

=== Military affairs ===
Ishiba is known as a gunji otaku (military geek) and has a keen interest in military matters. He is known for having a lot of expertise related to weapons systems, legal issues about defense, and is also fond of building and painting models of aircraft and ships. Ishiba has repeatedly stated that he believes that Japan needs its own equivalent of the United States Marine Corps to be able to defend its many small islands. In 2010 when he was policy chief for the LDP in opposition, and as secretary-general of the party in March 2013 after the LDP regained government.

==== Nuclear weapons ====
In 2011, Ishiba backed the idea of Japan maintaining the capability of building nuclear weapons. He said: "I don't think Japan needs to possess nuclear weapons, but it's important to maintain our commercial reactors because it would allow us to produce a nuclear warhead in a short amount of time ... It's a tacit nuclear deterrent." In 2017, Ishiba reiterated: "Japan should have the technology to build a nuclear weapon if it wants to do so." In 2024, Ishiba said the region should consider introducing nuclear weapons if it wants an Asian version of NATO.

== Affiliated organizations and parliamentary associations ==
- Nippon Kaigi Parliamentary League (far-right lobby group)
- Shinseiren Diet Members' Conference (jp:神道政治連盟国会議員懇談会)
- Cross-Party Parliamentary League for Considering Human Rights Diplomacy (jp:人権外交を超党派で考える議員連盟)

== Awards and honours ==
On 1 October 2025, Ishiba was awarded "Best Dressed Eyes" in the political category of the “Japan Eyewear Best Dresser Award 2025” due to his signature glasses. Ishiba was the first sitting prime minister in 29 years to be chosen as the politician with the "best dressed eyes" since Ryutaro Hashimoto.

== Personal life ==
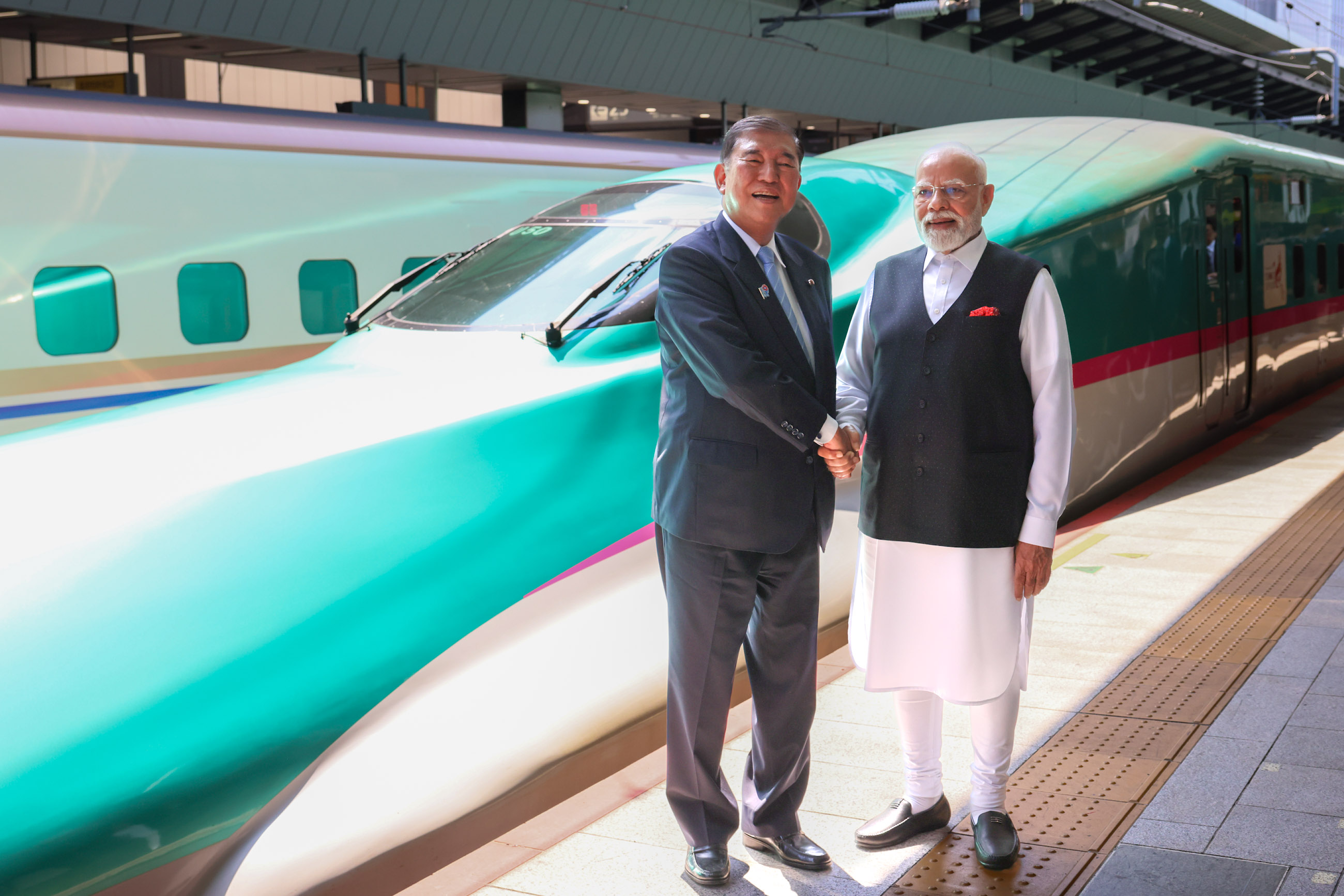
Ishiba poses with Indian Prime Minister Narendra Modi in front of the Tohoku Shinkansen in Tokyo Station, August 2025. Known as one of the most avid train enthusiasts in Japanese politics, Ishiba sees trains not just as a means of transportation, but as something with emotional appeal and a sense of escape from the ordinary. He also views trains as a key to regional revitalization.

Ishiba met his wife Yoshiko Nakamura when they were both students at Keio University. They married in 1983 and have two daughters. Ishiba is a Christian, specifically a Protestant. He was baptised at the age of 18 in the Tottori Church of the United Church of Christ in Japan. In recent years he has attended the Evangelical CBMC's National Prayer Breakfast. He also visits the Buddhist graves of his ancestors and worships at a Shinto shrine.

Ishiba is known as an "otaku" with a very high interest in the military, vehicles, and trains, and keeps a large collection of military-related plastic models, some of which are displayed at his office in the Diet. The Guardian described him as a "bookish idealist" in 2024. He is also a fan of the 1970s idol group Candies, is known to ride on sleeper trains to Tottori Prefecture as part of his interest in railways, and regards novelists Soseki Natsume and Ogai Mori as two of his favorite authors. Ishiba is also known as an avid reader, wherein he is noted to read three books daily, and stated that he "prefers reading more than mingle with his party colleagues".

Ishiba interacting with a Myaku-Myaku plushie to promote the 2025 Osaka Expo, 1 April 2025

He is the head of an intraparty ramen society that was established to promote the dish. Ishiba became the first prime minister to attend the Tokyo Girls Collection fashion show on 1 March 2025, seeking to promote a “cute, lively and cool” Japan, notably sporting a pair of jeans and sneakers. The event doubled as a promotion for the 2025 Osaka World Expo that took place the following April.

Despite being members of opposing parties, Ishiba is personally friends with CDP Leader Yoshihiko Noda, the leader of the opposition since 2024. He is also on good personal terms with Ishin co-leader Seiji Maehara, bonding over their shared love and appreciation of trains and occasionally riding trains together.

Ishiba made headlines when he allowed a Japan Self-Defense Forces vehicle to be displayed at the Shizuoka Hobby Show, a trade fair for plastic and radio-controlled models. During the visit of former United States Ambassador to Japan Howard Baker in 2002, Ishiba presented a plastic model of the Lockheed P-3 Orion in their meeting at his office. When the Russian defence minister visited Japan, Ishiba was said to have stayed up all night assembling a plastic model of the aircraft carrier Admiral Kuznetsov.

Ishiba is also known to be a heavy smoker.

== Bibliography ==
- Ishiba, Shigeru (7 August 2024). 保守政治家: わが政策、わが天命 [A Conservative Politician — My Policies, My Fate] (in Japanese). Kodansha. ISBN 9784065369975.

== Election history ==
Election	Age	District	Political party	Number of votes	election results
1986 Japanese general election	29	Tottori at-large district	LDP	56,534	Won
1990 Japanese general election	33	Tottori at-large district	LDP	82,169	Won
1993 Japanese general election	36	Tottori at-large district	Independent	137,025	Won
1996 Japanese general election	39	Tottori 1st district	Independent	94,147	Won
2000 Japanese general election	43	Tottori 1st district	LDP	91,163	Won
2003 Japanese general election	46	Tottori 1st district	LDP	114,283	Won
2005 Japanese general election	48	Tottori 1st district	LDP	106,805	Won
2009 Japanese general election	52	Tottori 1st district	LDP	118,121	Won
2012 Japanese general election	55	Tottori 1st district	LDP	124,746	Won
2014 Japanese general election	57	Tottori 1st district	LDP	93,105	Won
2017 Japanese general election	60	Tottori 1st district	LDP	106,425	Won
2021 Japanese general election	64	Tottori 1st district	LDP	105,441	Won
2024 Japanese general election	67	Tottori 1st district	LDP	106,670	Won
2026 Japanese general election	69	Tottori 1st district	LDP	66,146	Won

== Notes ==
House of Representatives (Japan)
Multi-member constituency	Representative for Tottori 1st district (multi-member); 1986–1996	Constituency abolished
New constituency	Representative for Tottori 1st district 1996–present	Incumbent
Political offices
Preceded by Gen Nakatani	Director General of Japan Defense Agency; 2002–2004	Succeeded by Yoshinori Ohno
Preceded by Masahiko Kōmura	Minister of Defence; 2007–2008	Succeeded by Yoshimasa Hayashi
Preceded by Seiichi Ota	Minister of Agriculture, Forestry and Fisheries; 2008–2009	Succeeded by Hirotaka Akamatsu
Preceded by Yoshitaka Shindo	Minister of State for Regional Revitalisation; 2014–2016	Succeeded by Kozo Yamamoto
Preceded by Fumio Kishida	Prime Minister of Japan; 2024–2025	Succeeded by Sanae Takaichi
Party political offices
Preceded by Kosuke Hori	Chairman of the Policy Research Council, Liberal Democratic Party; 2009–2011	Succeeded by Toshimitsu Motegi
Preceded by Nobuteru Ishihara	Secretary-General of the Liberal Democratic Party; 2012–2014	Succeeded by Sadakazu Tanigaki
Preceded by Fumio Kishida	President of the Liberal Democratic Party; 2024–2025	Succeeded by Sanae Takaichi
