= List of years in politics =

This page indexes the individual year in politics pages.

== 20th century ==
- 1900s
- 1910s
- 1920s
- 1930s
- 1940s
- 1950s
- 1960s

1960 - 1961 - 1962 - 1963 - 1964 - 1965 - 1966 - 1967 - 1968 - 1969

- 1970s

1970 - 1971 - 1972 - 1973 - 1974 - 1975 - 1976 - 1977 - 1978 - 1979

- 1980s

1980 - 1981 - 1982 - 1983 - 1984 - 1985 - 1986 - 1987 - 1988 - 1989

- 1990s

1990 - 1991 - 1992 - 1993 - 1994 - 1995 - 1996 - 1997 - 1998 - 1999

== 21st century ==
- 2000s

2000 - 2001 - 2002 - 2003 - 2004 - 2005 - 2006 - 2007 - 2008 - 2009

- 2010s

2010 - 2011 - 2012 - 2013 - 2014 - 2015 - 2016 - 2017 - 2018 - 2019

- 2020s

2020 - 2021 - 2022 - 2023 - 2024 - 2025 - 2026
