= 2013 in politics =

- Years in politics: 2010 2011 2012 2013 2014 2015 2016
- Centuries: 20th century · 21st century · 22nd century
- Decades: 1980s 1990s 2000s 2010s 2020s 2030s 2040s
- Years: 2010 2011 2012 2013 2014 2015 2016

These are some of the notable events relating to politics in 2013.

== Events ==
=== January ===
- January 21
  - Barack Obama begins his second term as President of the United States.
  - Attempted coup d'état in Eritrea
  - Nyamko Sabuni resigns as deputy education minister in Sweden, and is replaced with Maria Arnholm.
- January 23 – In a speech in London, British Prime Minister David Cameron outlines his intention to renegotiate the terms of the UK's membership of the European Union then offer a referendum on United Kingdom withdrawal from the European Union if a new deal is agreed.

=== February ===
- February 11 – Pope Benedict XVI announces his resignation as head of state of the Vatican City State, effective on the 28th.

=== July ===
- July 1 – Croatia becomes the 28th member of the European Union.

=== November ===
- November 1 – 2013 Thai protests began.
- November 11 – The 19th yearly session of the United Nations Climate Change Conference began in Warsaw, Poland, lasting until 22 November 2013.
