= 2005 in politics =

These are some of the notable events relating to politics in 2005.

== Events ==
=== January ===
- January 1
  - The Freedom of Information Act 2000 comes into force in the United Kingdom.
  - In Germany, stage IV of the Hartz concept brought together unemployment benefits and social security benefits, despite protests.
  - In Switzerland, Ruth Lüthi becomes president of the Council of State of Fribourg; Heinz Albicker becomes president of the government of Schaffhausen; Anne-Catherine Lyon becomes president of the Council of State of Vaud; Brigitte Profos becomes Landammann of Zug.
- January 2 – Aníbal Acevedo Vilá takes office as governor of Puerto Rico.
- January 4 – Violence in Iraq, assassination of the Governor of Baghdad, Ali al-Haidri.
- January 5 – Adam Daniel Rotfeld is sworn in as Foreign Minister of Poland.
- January 7 – Isidore Mvouba becomes Prime Minister of West Congo.
- January 14 – Sergey Morozov is inaugurated as governor of the Ulyanovsk Oblast.
- 15 January – Mahmoud Abbas is inaugurated as President of the Palestinian Authority.
- 20 January – George W. Bush is sworn in for a second term as President of the United States of America following his 2004 election victory.
- January 24 – Yulia Tymoshenko is named Prime Minister of Ukraine.
- 30 January – The people of Iraq vote in elections to choose 275 members of the inaugural Iraqi National Assembly.

=== February ===
- 8 February – In Denmark, the centre-right coalition of Prime Minister Anders Fogh Rasmussen is returned to power in a General Election, defeating the Social Democrats under Mogens Lykketoft.
- 16 February – In the United States, the school board in Staunton, Virginia voted to continue classes in Weekday Religious Education. This was a milestone in the issue of Separation of church and state in the United States.
- 20 February – Spain approves the European Constitution in a consultative referendum, though with a low turnout of 42%.

=== April ===
- 3 April – Regional elections in Italy deal a blow to the incumbent government and leads to the end of the Second Berlusconi government.
- 4 April – Askar Akayev resigns as President of Kyrgyzstan following weeks of popular unrest.
- 24 April – Presidential elections in Togo return Faure Gnassingbe to power two months after he was installed by the military following the death of his father, Gnassingbé Eyadéma

=== May ===
- 5 May – General Election in the United Kingdom sees Tony Blair's Labour government returned to office with a reduced majority of 66.
- 18 May – Spanish parliament completes the ratification of the Treaty establishing a Constitution for Europe.
- 29 May – France rejects the European Constitution by 55% to 45% in a legally binding referendum, pitching the European Union into a crisis and dealing a serious blow to the ratification process.

=== June ===
- 1 June
  - The United Kingdom assumes the rotating presidency of the European Union.
  - The Netherlands rejects the European Constitution by 62% to 38% in a consultative referendum. The result, following closely after the French referendum on 29 May, compounds the crisis surrounding the ratification process.
- 6 June – The Mensalão scandal, a major parliamentary scandal, erupts in Brazil.

=== July ===
- 10 July – Luxembourg approves the ratification of the European Constitution in a consultative referendum by 57% to 43%.

=== August ===
- 6 August – Conservative Mahmoud Ahmadinejad is sworn in as president of Iran, succeeding Mohammad Khatami.

=== September ===
- 17 September – New Zealand holds a general election, which Helen Clark's left-wing Labour Party wins, in coalition with the Progressives Party, with confidence and supply from New Zealand First and United Future, with further support from the Green and Māori parties.
- 18 September – General Election in Germany produces an inconclusive result, with a narrow majority for the Christian Democratic Union over the governing Social Democratic Party.
- 21 September – José Manuel Barroso, President of the European Commission, says that the European Union will probably not have a Constitution 'for two to three years' .

=== October ===
- 23 October – Brazil hosts a nation-wide referendum on the prohibition of the commerce of firearms and ammunition.
- 27 October – Political establishment in France is rocked by the spread of rioting among poor immigrant communities in suburbs of the major cities.

=== November ===
- 4 November – British Work and Pensions Secretary David Blunkett resigns from the Cabinet for the second time in a year, this time over allegations of improper business dealings.
- 6 November – Bob O'Connor Democrat defeats Joe Weinroth, Republican for Mayor of Pittsburgh, Pennsylvania.
- 8 November – French Prime Minister Dominique de Villepin declares a state of emergency to allow municipal authorities to cope with the rioting across the country.
- 21 November – Ariel Sharon, Prime Minister of Israel, resigns from the governing Likud party and founds his own new movement, Kadima.
- 22 November – After weeks of negotiations, Angela Merkel is sworn in as the eighth Chancellor of Germany – the first woman and the first East German to hold the post – succeeding Gerhard Schröder.
- 23 November – Kenyan President Mwai Kibaki dismisses his entire Cabinet after losing a key referendum on constitutional reform.

=== December ===
- 6 December – David Cameron becomes the 26th Leader of the British Conservative Party
- 15 December – Parliamentary elections are held in Iraq.
- 17 December – Evo Morales wins the presidential elections in Bolivia, ousting incumbent Eduardo Rodríguez and becoming the country's first indigenous leader.

== Deaths ==
- January 1 – Shirley Chisholm, first black woman elected to the U.S. Congress (born 1924)
- January 1 – Robert Matsui, Member of the U.S. Congress from Sacramento, California (born 1941)
- January 4 – Ali al-Haidri, Governor of Baghdad
- January 10 – James Forman, American civil rights activist (born 1928)
- January 15 – Ruth Warrick, American actress and political activist
- January 17 – Zhao Ziyang, reformist Premier of the People's Republic of China and General Secretary of the Chinese Communist Party (born 1919)
- February 2 – Zurab Zhvania prime minister of Georgia, is suffocated in a gas leak at a friend's home
- February 5 – Gnassingbé Eyadéma President of Togo since 1967, dies of an illness
- February 14 – Former prime minister of Lebanon Rafiq Hariri is assassinated in Beirut in a massive car bomb explosion.
- February 24 – Hans-Jürgen Wischnewski, German politician
- March 8 – Aslan Maskhadov rebel President of Chechnya is killed in battle with Russian troops
- March 28 – Howell Heflin former United States senator from Alabama
- April 2 – Pope John Paul II, Head of the Roman Catholic Church and chief of state of the Vatican City dies of heart failure
- April 6 – Rainier III Prince of Monaco since 1948, second longest-reigning head of state in the world at the time of his death
- August 19 – Mo Mowlam, British MP (born 1949)
- September 5 – Roberto Viaux, Chilean Army General and the primary planner in two attempted coups d'état in Chile

== See also ==
- List of years in politics
