= 1995 in politics =

- Years in politics: 1992 1993 1994 1995 1996 1997 1998
- Centuries: 19th century · 20th century · 21st century
- Decades: 1960s 1970s 1980s 1990s 2000s 2010s 2020s
- Years: 1992 1993 1994 1995 1996 1997 1998

These are some of the notable events relating to politics in 1995.

== Events ==
=== January ===
- January 1- André Degroeve becomes Governor of Brussels-Capital.
- January 1- Fernando Henrique Cardoso becomes President of Brazil.
- January 1- Orleir Messias Cameli becomes Governor of Acre.
- January 1- Divaldo Suruagy becomes Governor of Alagoas.
- January 1- João Alberto Rodrigues Capiberibe becomes Governor of Amapá.
- January 1- Amazonino Armando Mendes becomes Governor of Amazonas.
- January 1- Paulo Ganem Souto becomes Governor of Bahia.
- January 1- Tasso Ribeiro Jereissati becomes Governor of Ceará.
- January 1- Cristovam Buarque becomes Governor of Distrito Federal.
- January 1- Victor Buaiz becomes Governor of Espírito Santo
- January 1- Luiz Alberto Maguito Vilela becomes Governor of Goiás.
- January 1- Roseana Macieira Sarney Murad becomes Governor of Maranhão.
- January 1- Dante Martins de Oliveira becomes Governor of Mato Grosso.
- January 1- Wilson Barbosa Martins becomes Governor of Mato Grosso do Sul.
- January 1- Eduardo Brandão de Azeredo becomes Governor of Minas Gerais.
- January 1- Almir José de Oliveira Gabriel becomes Governor of Pará.
- January 1- Antonio Marques da Silva Mariz becomes Governor of Paraíba.
- January 1- Jaime Lerner becomes Governor of Paraná.
- January 1- Miguel Arraes de Alencar becomes Governor of Pernambuco.
- January 1- Francisco de Assis de Moraes Souza becomes Governor of Piauí.
- January 1- Marcello Nunes de Alencar becomes Governor of Rio de Janeiro
- January 1- Garibaldi Alves Filho becomes Governor of Rio Grande do Norte.
- January 1- Antônio Britto Filho becomes Governor of Rio Grande do Sul.
- January 1- Valdir Raupp de Mattos becomes Governor of Rondônia.
- January 1- Neudo Ribeiro Campos becomes Governor of Roraima.
- January 1- Paulo Afonso Evangelista Vieira becomes Governor of Santa Catarina.
- January 1- Mário Covas Júnior becomes Governor of São Paulo.
- January 1- Albano do Prado Pimentel Franco becomes Governor Sergipe.
- January 1- José Wilson Siqueira Campos becomes Governor of Tocantins.
- January 1- Dianne L. Haskett becomes Mayor of London, Ontario.
- January 3- Sir Orville Alton Turnquest becomes Governor General of the Bahamas.
- January 6- Pierre Dartout becomes Prefect of French Guiana.
- January 16- Helen Maksagak becomes Commissioner of the Northwest Territories.
- January 25- Zhan Videnov becomes Premier of Bulgaria.

=== February ===
- February 1- Martin Mowbray becomes Governor of the Cocos Islands.
- February 8- Roméo LeBlanc becomes Governor General of Canada.
- February 22- Antoine Nduwayo becomes Prime Minister of Burundi.

=== March ===
- March 2- Josef Pühringer becomes Premier of Oberösterreich.
- March 9- Kate Carnell becomes Chief Administrator of Australian Capital Territory.

=== April ===
- April 4- Bob Carr becomes Premier of New South Wales.
- April 12- Gabriel Koyambounou becomes Governor of the Central African Republic.
- April 8- Koibla Djimasta becomes Prime Minister of Chad.
- April 13- Paavo Lipponen becomes Prime Minister of Finland.
- April 17- Tiit Vähi becomes Prime Minister of Estonia.
- April 21- Garde Gardom becomes Lieutenant Governor of British Columbia.
- April 29- Caabi El-Yachroutu Mohamed becomes Prime Minister of Comoros.

=== May ===
- May 1- Jacques Chirac becomes President of France.
- May 15- Ralph O'Neal becomes Chief Minister of the British Virgin Islands.
- May 18- Alain Juppé becomes Prime Minister of France.
- May 26- Shane Stone becomes Chief Minister of Northern Territory.

=== June ===
- June 12- Judy Gingell becomes Commissioner of the Yukon Territory.
- June 14- Edison James becomes Prime Minister of Dominica.
- June 15-June 17 - 21st G7 summit takes place in Halifax, Nova Scotia, Canada.
- June 18- Wang Yunkun becomes acting Governor of Jilin.
- June 26- Mike Harris becomes Premier of Ontario.

=== July ===
- July 6- Carlos Arturo Juárez becomes Governor of Santiago del Estero.
- July 8- Eduardo Bauzá becomes Cabinet Chief of Argentina.
- July 12- Ramón Mestre becomes Governor of Córdoba.
- July 27- Milan Babić becomes Prime Minister of the Republic of Serbian Krajina.

=== August ===
- August 22- Negasso Gidada becomes President of Ethiopia.
- August 23- Meles Zenawi becomes Prime Minister of Ethiopia.
- August 30- Gilbert Clements becomes Lieutenant Governor of Prince Edward Island.

=== September ===
- September 18- José Targino Maranhão becomes Governor of Paraíba.
- September 29- Ayoubo Combo becomes Coordinator of the Transitional Military Committee of Comoros.

=== October ===
- October 2- Sir Guy Green becomes Governor of Tasmania.
- October 2- Mohamed Taki Abdoulkarim becomes President of Comoros, and Said Ali Kemal becomes acting President of Comoros.
- October 5- Caamby El-Yachourtu becomes interim President of Comoros.
- October 16- Rajko Kasagic becomes Prime Minister of Republika Srpska.
- October 16- John Wynne Owen becomes Governor of the Cayman Islands.
- October 29- Antonio Domingo Bussi becomes Governor of Tucumán.

=== November ===
- November 3- Alan Hoole becomes Governor of Anguilla.
- November 4- Zlatko Mateša becomes Prime Minister of Croatia.
- November 22- Don Morin becomes Premier of the Northwest Territories.
- November 24- Roger Jansson becomes Chief Minister of Åland.

=== December ===
- December 9- Ángel Maza becomes Governor of La Rioja.
- December 9- Pablo Verani becomes Governor of Río Negro
- December 10- Ángel Rozas becomes Governor of Chaco.
- December 10- Jorge Busti becomes Governor of Entre Ríos.
- December 10- Guillermo Snopek becomes Governor of the Jujuy Province.
- December 10- Felipe Sapag becomes Governor of Neuquén.
- December 10- Juan Carlos Romero becomes Governor of Salta.
- December 11- Gildo Insfrán becomes Governor of Formosa.
- December 11- Arturo Lafalla becomes Governor of Mendoza.
- December 11- Jorge Obeid becomes Governor of Santa Fe Province.
- December 14- Carl Bildt of Sweden becomes the International High Representative of Bosnia and Herzegovina.
- December 19- Sir Denys Williams becomes acting Governor General of Barbados.
- December 31- Ahmed Ouyahia becomes Prime Minister of Algeria.
