= 2003 in politics =

These are some of the notable events relating to politics in 2003.

== Events ==
=== January 1 ===
- January 1: Luiz Inácio Lula da Silva takes office as president of Brazil. His cabinet includes Celso Amorim as foreign minister; Antônio Waldez Góes da Silva becomes Governor of Amapá, Carlos Eduardo de Sousa Braga becomes governor of Amazonas, Paulo César Hartung Gomes becomes governor of Espírito Santo, Blairo Borges Maggi becomes governor of Mato Grosso, Simão Robison Oliveira Jatene becomes governor of Pará, Cássio Rodrigues da Cunha Lima becomes governor of Paraíba, Roberto Requião de Mello e Silva becomes governor of Paraná, José Wellington Barroso de Araújo Dias becomes governor of Piauí, Wilma Maria de Faria becomes governor of Rio Grande do Norte, Germano Antônio Rigotto becomes governor of Rio Grande do Sul, Ivo Narciso Cassol becomes governor of Rondônia, and Marcelo de Carvalho Miranda becomes governor of Tocantins.
- January 1: Pavel Chernov takes office as prime minister of Karelia.
- January 1: Pascal Couchepin takes office as President of the Confederation and Interior Minister of Switzerland; Ruth Metzler-Arnold becomes vice president; Claude Lässer becomes president of the Council of State of Fribourg, Stefan Engler president of the government of Graubünden, Gérald Schaller president of the government of Canton of Jura, Margrit Fischer-Willimann Schultheiss of Luzern, Christian Wanner Landammann of Solothurn, and Jean-Claude Mermoud president of the Council of State of Vaud, and Walter Suter Landammann of Zug.
- January 1: Kenneth W. Dam becomes acting treasury secretary of the United States; Bill Richardson takes office as Governor of New Mexico and Jennifer Granholm as Governor of Michigan.

=== January 2-January 7 ===
- January 2: Mitt Romney is inaugurated as Governor of Massachusetts.
- January 3: Kalonzo Musyoka becomes foreign minister of Kenya.
- January 4: Democrat Ed Case is elected in a Hawaii special Congressional election, replacing Patsy Mink, who had been elected to Congress posthumously in November 2002.
- January 5: Rolandas Paksas wins presidential elections in Lithuania. He takes office on February 26.
- January 6: Ong Keng Yong of Singapore takes office as secretary-general of ASEAN
- January 6: Felix Camacho takes office as governor of Guam.
- January 6: Harmodio Arias Cerjack becomes foreign minister of Panama.
- January 6: Dave Freudenthal takes office as Governor of Wyoming, Janet Napolitano as Governor of Arizona, Jim Doyle as Governor of Wisconsin and Tim Pawlenty as Governor of Minnesota.
- January 7: Donald Carcieri takes office as Governor of Rhode Island and Mike Rounds as Governor of South Dakota.

=== January 8-January 14 ===
- January 8: Sudarshan Agarwal is sworn in as governor of Uttaranchal, now known as Uttarakhand.
- January 8: Jim Douglas takes office as Governor of Vermont and John Baldacci as Governor of Maine.
- January 8: A new government is approved in Montenegro; Milo Djukanovic becomes prime minister, Dragisa Burzan becomes foreign minister.
- January 9: Craig Benson takes office as Governor of New Hampshire.
- January 10: In elections in Djibouti, the Union for a Presidential Majority wins 62.2% of the vote against 36.9% for the Union for a Democratic Alternative.
- January 10: Luis Ernesto Derbez becomes foreign minister of Mexico; Fernando Elizondo Barragán is sworn in as interim governor of Nuevo León.
- January 13: Brad Henry takes office as Governor of Oklahoma, Kathleen Sebelius as Governor of Kansas, Rod Blagojevich as Governor of Illinois, Sonny Perdue as Governor of Georgia, Ted Kulongoski as Governor of Oregon.

=== January 15-January 31 ===
- January 15: Lucio Gutiérrez takes office as president of Ecuador; Nina Pacari Vega becomes foreign minister.
- January 15: The Chief Minister of Maharashtra resigns, he is later replaced by Sushil Kumar Shinde.
- January 15: Mark Sanford takes office as Governor of South Carolina and Robert L. Ehrlich as Governor of Maryland.
- January 17: Hans Enoksen of the Siumut party forms a new Greenland government with the Atassut party.
- January 18: Phil Bredesen takes office as Governor of Tennessee.
- January 19: Meng Xuenong is elected mayor of Beijing.
- January 19: In Cuban parliamentary elections all candidates are elected unopposed.
- January 20: Bob Riley takes office as Governor of Alabama.
- January 21: Ed Rendell takes office as Governor of Pennsylvania.
- January 24: Gennady Mikichura becomes prime minister of Adygeya.

=== February ===
- February 1: Christoph Eymann becomes president of the government of Basel-Stadt.
- February 3: John Snow is made U.S. treasury secretary.
- February 4: Yugoslavia is renamed to Serbia and Montenegro converting the federal republic to a looser union.
- February 5: The head of the pro-Moscow administration of Chechnya, announces the dismissal of their Prime Minister, who is later replaced by Anatoly Popov.
- February 6: Yegor Borisov becomes prime minister of Sakha.
- February 9: Presidential elections in Montenegro fail again when the turnout is below 50%.
- February 14: New high commissioner Sandra Lee-Vercoe arrives at Niue.
- February 16: Tassos Papadopoulos wins presidential elections in Cyprus.
- February 17: Oleg Budargin takes office as governor of Taymyr.
- February 25: Roh Moo Hyun takes office as president of South Korea; Parliament later approves Goh Kun as prime minister, who would later appoint Yoon Young Kwan as foreign minister.
- February 28: Silvan Shalom is approved as Foreign Minister of Israel.

=== March–June ===
- March 12 PM of Serbia Zoran Đinđić assassinated.
- March 15 coup in Central African Republic.
- March 15: Hu Jintao takes office as President of China
- March 16: Wen Jiabao takes office as Premier of China.
- March 16: Elections for the parliament are held in Finland. See Politics of Finland.
- March 26: American Samoa Governor Tauese Sunia dies. He is succeeded by Lieutenant Governor Togiola Tulafono.
- April 9: Government of Saddam Hussein overthrown by American forces in Iraq.
- May 1: Elections are held in Scotland and Wales for the Scottish Parliament and National Assembly for Wales. In Wales, Labour gains seats while Plaid Cymru loses seats. In Scotland, Labour and Scottish Nationalists lose seats, while the Greens and Socialists gain seats.
- May 25: Néstor Kirchner becomes president of Argentina.
- June 3: Republican Randy Neugebauer defeats fellow Republican Mike Conaway in a Texas Congressional special runoff election to succeed Larry Combest, who resigned in November 2002. Both men had advanced to the runoff in a May 2003 primary.

=== July–September ===
- July 16: Coup in São Tomé and Príncipe, reversed on July 23.
- August 11: Moses Blah replaces Charles Taylor as president of Liberia.
- September 9: Indiana lieutenant governor Joe Kernan becomes acting governor when governor Frank O'Bannon suffers a stroke, and is sworn in as governor when O'Bannon dies a few days later. Both are Democrats.
- September 14: Sweden rejects adopting the Euro in a referendum. (Results.)
- September 14: Estonia approves joining the European Union in a referendum.
- September 14: Coup in Guinea-Bissau.
- September 18: Liberal Democrat Sarah Teather is elected in a London By-election to succeed Paul Daisley, who died in June 2003.

=== October 1-October 7 ===
- October 2: Canadian province of Ontario conducts a general election to elect members to the Ontario government. The election, which was called by Ontario Progressive Conservative Party Premier Ernie Eves, is majority won by the Dalton McGuinty-led Ontario Liberal Party.
- October 3: Richard Butler is sworn in as Governor of Tasmania.
- October 3: Laila Freivalds is appointed foreign minister of Sweden.
- October 4: Democrat Kathleen Babineaux Blanco and Republican Bobby Jindal advance to a runoff to decide who becomes Louisiana Governor.
- October 5: Chairman of the Palestinian Authority Yasir Arafat installs Ahmed Qureia as prime minister of an emergency cabinet.
- October 5: Valentina Matviyenko is elected governor of Saint Petersburg over Anna Markova.
- October 7: Teresa Patrício Gouveia becomes Foreign Minister of Portugal replacing António Martins da Cruz.
- October 7: Giovanni Lajolo is appointed foreign minister of the Vatican.
- October 7: In California, Democratic Governor Gray Davis is recalled. Republican Arnold Schwarzenegger is elected to replace Davis.

=== October 8-October 31 ===
- October 14: Gyude Bryant takes office as chairman of the National Transitional Government of Liberia.
- October 17: Carlos Mesa is sworn in as president of Bolivia after the resignation of Gonzalo Sánchez de Lozada.
- October 29: José Alperovich takes office as governor of Tucumán.
- October 31: Mahathir Mohamad, resigns as the fourth Prime Minister of Malaysia, and Abdullah Ahmad Badawi takes office as the fifth prime minister of the country.

=== November 1-November 7 ===
- November 1: Jalal Talabani takes up the rotating presidency of the Governing Council of Iraq.
- November 1: Ilya Klebanov is appointed plenipotentiary of the president of Russia in Northwestern Federal District.
- November 4: Republican Haley Barbour defeats Democrat incumbent Ronnie Musgrove to become Governor of Mississippi. Republican Ernie Fletcher defeats Democrat Ben Chandler to become Governor of Kentucky. In San Francisco, mayoral candidates Gavin Newsom and Matt Gonzalez advance to a runoff.
- November 5: Canadian province of Saskatchewan holds a general election which is won by the ruling Saskatchewan New Democrats.
- November 5: Olene S. Walker is sworn in as governor of Utah after the resignation of Mike Leavitt.
- November 6: Danny Williams is sworn in as premier of Newfoundland and Labrador.
- November 6: Sabas Pretelt de la Vega is named Interior Minister of Colombia after the resignation of Fernando Londoño Hoyos.
- November 6: Michael Howard replaces Iain Duncan Smith as leader of the Conservative Party in the U.K.
- November 7: Mohamed Vall Ould Bellal becomes foreign minister of Mauritania.

=== November 8-November 30 ===
- November 15: Democrat Kathleen Babineaux Blanco defeats Republican Bobby Jindal in a runoff election to become Governor of Louisiana.
- November 17: Arnold Schwarzenegger is sworn in as governor of California.
- November 18: Ted Egan is sworn in as administrator of Northern Territory.
- November 23: Nino Burdzhanadze is declared President of Georgia after opposition forces stormed parliament, the new government includes Zurab Zhvania as minister of state and Tedo Japaridze as foreign minister.
- November 28: The Democratic Unionist Party and Sinn Féin displace the Ulster Unionist Party and the Social Democratic and Labour Party as the largest Unionist and Nationalist parties after elections to the Northern Ireland Assembly.

=== December ===
- December 1: Abdul Aziz al-Hakim takes up the rotating presidency of the Governing Council of Iraq.
- December 3: Bernard Bot takes office as foreign minister of the Netherlands.
- December 3: Robert Cramer becomes president of the Council of State of Genève.
- December 8: South Dakota Congressman Bill Janklow is convicted of manslaughter.
- December 9: Former Vice President Al Gore endorses Democratic Presidential candidate Howard Dean for President.
- December 9: Ernie Fletcher is sworn-in as Governor of Kentucky and resigns his seat in Congress.
- December 9: Ivo Sanader designated new Prime Minister of Croatia.
- December 10: Gavin Newsom defeats Matt Gonzalez in a runoff election to become San Francisco mayor.
- December 10: Christoph Blocher and Hans-Rudolf Merz are elected to the Swiss Federal Council, Ruth Metzler-Arnold is not re-elected.
- December 12: Célestin Gaombalet new Prime Minister of Central African Republic
- December 12: Paul Martin, Jr. new Prime Minister of Canada.

== Deaths ==
=== January–February ===
- January 5: Roy Jenkins, former president of the European Commission (1977–1981)
- January 6: Sir Gerald Cash, former Governor-General of the Bahamas (1979–1988)
- January 10: C. Douglas Dillon, former treasury secretary of the United States (1961–1965)
- January 12: Leopoldo Galtieri, former president of Argentina (1981–1982)
- January 27: Henryk Jabłoński, former chairman of the Council of State of Poland (1972–1985)
- February 1: Richard Lyng, former U.S. secretary of agriculture (1986–1989)
- February 13: Walt W. Rostow, former U.S. national security advisor (1966–1968)
- February 15: Francisque Ravony, former Prime Minister of Madagascar (1993–1995)
- February 20: Orville L. Freeman, former U.S. secretary of agriculture (1961–1969)

=== March–August ===
- March 1: Fidel Sánchez Hernández, former president of El Salvador (1967–1972)
- March 10: Bernard Dowiyogo president of Nauru.
- March 12: Zoran Đinđić prime minister of Serbia
- March 30: Valentin Pavlov, former prime minister of the Soviet Union (1991)
- April 30: Aureliano Chaves, former Brazilian vice president (1979–1985)
- May 15: Constantin Dăscălescu, former prime minister of Romania (1982–1989)
- June 1?: Johnny Paul Koroma, President of Sierra Leone 1997-1998.
- June 10: Donald Regan, former U.S. treasury secretary (1981–1985) and White House chief of staff (1985–1987)
- June 25: Lester Maddox segregationist governor of Georgia from 1967 to 1971.
- June 26: Strom Thurmond, longtime U.S. senator
- August 16: Idi Amin, former president of Uganda (1971–1979)
- August 19: Carlos Roberto Reina, former president of Honduras (1994–1998)
- August 20: Igor Farkhutdinov, Russian politician, governor of Sakhalin (killed in plane crash).
- August 23: Michael Kijana Wamalwa, sitting vice-president of Kenya

=== September–December ===
- September 11: Anna Lindh, foreign minister of Sweden (assassinated).
- October 14: Moktar Ould Daddah, former president of Mauritania.
- October 23: Soong Mei-ling, former first lady of the Republic of China.
- November 20: David Dacko, former president of Central African Republic.
- December 6: Carlos Manuel Arana Osorio, former president of Guatemala.
- December 12: Heydar Aliyev, former president of Azerbaijan.
- December 14: Blas Ople, Foreign Secretary of the Philippines.

== See also ==
- List of years in politics
