= 2002 in politics =

These are some of the notable events relating to politics in 2002.

== Events ==
=== January ===
- January 1- Eduardo Duhalde is appointed President of Argentina. He appoints Jorge Capitanich as cabinet chief, Carlos Ruckauf as foreign minister; Felipe Solá becomes governor of Buenos Aires.
- January 1- Safet Halilović becomes President of the Federation of Bosnia and Herzegovina.
- January 1- Manuel Andrade Díaz takes office as governor of Tabasco.
- January 1- Kaspar Villiger becomes president of Switzerland; Pascal Corminboeuf becomes president of the Council of State of Fribourg; Claudio Lardi president of the government of Graubünden; Anita Rion president of the government of Jura; Ulrich Fässler Schultheiss of Luzern; Herbert Bühl president of the government of Schaffhausen; Rolf Ritschard Landammann of Solothurn; and Francine Jeanprêtre president of the Council of State of Vaud.
- January 1- Michael Bloomberg takes office as mayor of New York City.
- January 2- Levy Mwanawasa takes office as president of Zambia; Katele Kalumba becomes foreign minister.
- January 4- Assad Shoman is sworn in as foreign minister of Belize.
- January 6- Mikhail Lapshin wins Presidential run-off election in the Altai Republic.
- January 7- Michelle Bachelet is named defense minister of Chile, becoming the first woman in Latin America to hold the post.
- January 8- Kristiina Ojuland becomes foreign minister of Estonia.
- January 8- John Farmer, Jr. becomes acting Governor of New Jersey, followed by John O. Bennett and then Richard Codey until governor-elect Jim McGreevey is sworn in.
- January 10- Enrique Bolaños takes office as president of Nicaragua; Norman José Caldera Cardenal becomes foreign minister.
- January 12- Mark Warner takes office as governor of Virginia.
- January 13- In the Presidential runoff in Sakha, Vyacheslav Shtyrov is elected.
- January 13- Diosdado Cabello is named executive vice-president of Venezuela.
- January 14- Juan Babauta takes office as governor of the Northern Mariana Islands.
- January 15- Bill Graham is named as foreign minister of Canada.
- January 15- Pat Cox of Ireland is elected president of the European Parliament.
- January 15- Vladimir Torlopov takes office as head of the Komi Republic.
- January 18- P. S. Ramamohan Rao is sworn in as governor of Tamil Nadu.
- January 18- Natalya Partasova is confirmed as prime minister of Chuvashia.
- January 21- Yu Shyi-kun is named Premier of Taiwan; Eugene Chien is appointed as foreign minister; Fan Kuang-chun as governor of Taiwan Province.
- January 22- Georgi Parvanov takes office as president of Bulgaria.
- January 27- Ricardo Maduro takes office as president of Honduras; Guillermo Pérez Arias becomes foreign minister.
- January 28- Imangali Tasmagambetov is appointed as the prime minister of Kazakhstan.

=== February ===
- February 1- Yoriko Kawaguchi is named Foreign Minister of Japan.
- February 4- Choi Sung Hong becomes foreign minister of South Korea.
- February 8- Semyon Nazarov becomes prime minister of Sakha.
- February 8- Hazret Medzhidovich Sovmen is sworn in as president of Adygea.
- February 13- Amarinder Singh is sworn in as chief minister of Punjab.
- February 14- Beriz Belkić becomes chairman of the Presidency of Bosnia and Herzegovina.
- February 15- Angidi Chettiar becomes acting president of Mauritius who is soon replaced by Ariranga Pillay, and finally Karl Offmann.
- February 15- Lázaro Cárdenas Batel is sworn in as governor of Michoacán
- February 19- Mikhail Shatalov becomes prime minister of North Ossetia–Alania
- February 22- Marc Ravalomanana declares himself President of Madagascar.

=== March ===
- March 2- Narain Dutt Tiwari is sworn in as chief minister of Uttaranchal, now known as Uttarakhand.
- March 3- Gabriel Costa's Movement for the Liberation of São Tomé and Príncipe wins parliamentary elections in São Tomé and Príncipe, he would later become prime minister.
- March 4- Yvon Neptune is designated Prime Minister of Haiti.
- March 4- Ibrahim Rugova is elected President of Kosovo; Bajram Rexhepi is appointed prime minister.
- March 5- Mike Rann is sworn in as premier of South Australia.
- March 6- Nikolay Demchuk is approved as prime minister of Adygeya.
- March 7- James Bartleman takes office as lieutenant governor of Ontario.
- March 15- Dragan Mikerević is elected Prime Minister of Bosnia and Herzegovina.
- March 18- Modibo Keita (born 1942) becomes Prime Minister of Mali.

=== April ===
- April 1- Antonio Lazzaro Volpinari and Giovanni Francesco Ugolini take office as captains-regent of San Marino.
- April 1- Hassan Muhammad Nur "Shatigadud" is sworn in as President of Southwestern Somalia.
- April 1- Ernst Hasler takes office as Landammann of Aargau.
- April 5- Otto Roberto Mendonça de Alencar becomes governor of Bahia; Benedita Souza da Silva Sampaio becomes governor of Rio de Janeiro.
- April 6- José Manuel Durão Barroso is sworn in as prime minister of Portugal; António Martins da Cruz becomes foreign minister.
- April 8- Alda Bandeira becomes Foreign Minister of São Tomé and Príncipe.
- April 11- Sir John Vereker is sworn in as governor of Bermuda.
- April 12- Pedro Carmona Estanga becomes president of the transitional government of Venezuela.
- April 15- Ernie Eves becomes premier of Ontario.
- April 18- Georg Milbradt becomes minister-president of the German of Free State of Saxony.
- April 23- Charles-Louis Rochat becomes president of the Council of State of Vaud.
- April 28- Nikolay Ashlapov becomes acting governor of Krasnoyarsk.
- April 28- Bruno Koster is elected as Regierender Landammann of Appenzell-Innerrhoden.

=== May ===
- May 1- Young Vivian is elected Prime Minister of Niue.
- May 1- Thomas Burgener takes office as president of the Council of State of Valais; Ernst Buschor takes office as president of the government of Zürich.
- May 2- Perry Christie is elected Prime Minister of The Bahamas, selects Fred Mitchell as Foreign Minister.
- May 3- Dahir Riyale Kahin becomes President of Somaliland.
- May 5- French Presidential elections, Jean-Pierre Raffarin named prime minister, Dominique de Villepin named Foreign Minister.
- May 5- Jakob Kamm is elected Landammann of Glarus.
- May 8- Abel Pacheco de la Espriella takes office as president of Costa Rica; Roberto Tovar Faja becomes foreign minister.
- May 9- Acting governor installed in the Cayman Islands to serve until the arrival of Bruce Dinwiddy.
- May 12- Sergey Katanandov takes office as head of the republic of Karelia.
- May 13- Marcel Ranjeva named Foreign Minister of Madagascar.
- May 16- Jean-Luc Harousseau becomes acting president of the Regional Council of Pays de la Loire.
- May 16- Wolfgang Böhmer takes office as minister-president of the German state of Saxony-Anhalt.
- May 20- Xanana Gusmão is sworn in as President of East Timor.
- May 21- Patrizia Pesenti becomes president of the Council of State of Ticino.
- May 22- Nikolay Tanayev is named acting Prime Minister of Kyrgyzstan
- May 23- Murat Zyazikov is sworn in as president of Ingushetia.
- May 27- Paddy Ashdown, Baron Ashdown of Norton-sub-Hamdon, takes over as international high representative of Bosnia and Herzegovina.
- May 27- Péter Medgyessy is elected prime minister of Hungary; László Kovács becomes foreign minister.
- May 29- Petr Švec becomes acting mayor of Prague.
- May 30- Roy Chaderton is sworn in as foreign minister of Venezuela.

=== June ===
- June 1- Elisabeth Zölch-Balmer becomes president of the government of Bern; Pierre Hirschy becomes president of the Council of State of Neuchâtel; Hans Peter Ruprecht becomes president of the government of Thurgau; and Gabi Huber Landammann of Uri.
- June 3- Etienne Ys becomes prime minister of the Netherlands Antilles.
- June 3- Piet Meyer is sworn in as acting premier of Western Cape, to be eventually replaced by Marthinus van Schalkwyk.
- June 7- The Pakistani Foreign Minister offers his resignation, and is eventually replaced by Inam ul-Haq.
- June 7- Viktor Maslov takes office as head of the administration of Smolensk Oblast.
- June 8- Amadou Toumani Touré is sworn in as president of Mali. He eventually names Lassana Traoré Foreign Minister.
- June 10- François Lonseny Fall is named foreign minister of Guinea.
- June 12- Mohlabi Tsekoa becomes foreign minister of Lesotho.
- June 14- Askar Aitmatov becomes foreign minister of Kyrgyzstan.
- June 21- Jamiruddin Sircar becomes acting President of Bangladesh.
- June 22- Matthias Platzeck is sworn in as Minister-President of Brandenburg.
- June 26- Álvaro Silva Calderón of Venezuela is elected Secretary-General of OPEC.
- June 27- Koffi Sama is named Prime Minister of Togo.
- June 28- Élisabeth Morin becomes president of the Regional Council of Poitou-Charentes.

=== July ===
- July 1- Frits Goedgedrag takes office as governor of the Netherlands Antilles
- July 1- Elsbeth Schneider-Kenel becomes president of the government of Basel-Land; Leo Odermatt becomes Landammann of Nidwalden; Hans Hofer becomes Landammann of Obwalden; Peter Schönenberger becomes Landammann of Sankt Gallen, and Friedrich Huwyler becomes Landammann of Schwyz.
- July 4- Jan Peter Balkenende is asked to form a new government as Prime Minister of the Netherlands; he will select Jaap de Hoop Scheffer as foreign minister, and Johan Remkes as interior minister.
- July 6- Rama Jois is named as governor of Jharkhand.
- July 9- The governor of Maharashtra resigns, he will eventually be replaced by C K Thakkar.
- July 9- Members of the Peruvian cabinet resign, and are eventually replaced by Luis Solari as prime minister and Allan Wagner Tizón as foreign minister.
- July 9- Ana Palacios is named foreign minister of Spain.
- July 11- Chang Sang is named Prime Minister of South Korea.
- July 11- The Foreign Minister of Turkey resigns. He is to be replaced by Şükrü Sina Gürel.
- July 12- Vladimír Špidla is appointed as prime minister of the Czech Republic. Cyril Svoboda will become Foreign Minister.
- July 15- Igor Nemec is elected mayor of Prague.
- July 18- A. P. J. Abdul Kalam is elected president of India.
- July 22- K. R. Malkani is appointed as lieutenant governor of Puducherry.
- July 24- Alfred Moisiu takes office as President of Albania.
- July 24- James Traficant was expelled from the United States House of Representatives after being convicted of ten felony counts.
- July 27- New Zealand holds a general election, which Helen Clark's left-wing Labour Party wins, in coalition with the Progressive Party and confidence and supply from the United Future Party.

=== August ===
- August 2- Saufatu Sopoanga is elected prime minister of Tuvalu by Parliament.
- August 4- Congress chooses Gonzalo Sánchez de Lozada as president of Bolivia.
- August 5- Parliament elects Sir Michael Somare as prime minister of Papua New Guinea.
- August 7- Álvaro Uribe Vélez is sworn in as president of Colombia; Carolina Barco is sworn in as foreign minister.
- August 9- Chang Dae Whan is named Prime Minister of South Korea.
- August 14- Lyonpo Kinzang Dorji becomes prime minister of Bhutan.
- August 26- Viktor Aleksentsev is appointed acting Prime Minister of Ingushetia.
- August 28- Theo-Ben Gurirab becomes Prime Minister of Namibia.

=== September ===
- September 1- Supachai Panitchpakdi of Thailand becomes director-general of the WTO.
- September 2- Ange Mancini takes office as prefect of French Guiana.
- September 5- Iajuddin Ahmed is declared President-elect of Bangladesh.
- September 10- Kim Suk Soo is named Prime Minister of South Korea.
- September 15 - The Swedish general election leaves Prime Minister Göran Persson and the Social Democrats in power.
- September 30- Lena Hjelm-Wallén is named defense minister of Sweden.

=== October ===
- October 1- Giuseppe Maria Morganti and Mauro Chiaruzzi are installed as Captains-regent of San Marino.
- October 3- Aleksandr Khloponin is named acting governor of Krasnoyarsk.
- October 3- Maria das Neves is named Prime Minister of São Tomé and Príncipe.
- October 4- The King of Nepal would abolish his council of ministers, and would later hire Lokendra Bahadur Chand as prime minister.
- October 5- Elections are held in Bosnia and Herzegovina. Dragan Čović, Mirko Šarović, and Sulejman Tihić elected to the three seat presidency for the Croats, the Serbs, and the Muslim seats respectively.
- October 9- Driss Jettou is appointed Prime Minister of Morocco.
- October 12- The first Rodrigues Regional Assembly opens in Mauritius. Claude Wong So would later be appointed as chief executive.
- October 14- Tom Macan is sworn in as Governor of the British Virgin Islands.
- October 18- Nikolay Dudov becomes acting governor of Magadan.

=== November ===
- November 1- Edward Roberts is sworn in as lieutenant governor of Newfoundland and Labrador.
- November 1- Branko Crvenkovski is elected Prime Minister of the Republic of Macedonia.
- November 2- Mufti Mohammad Sayeed takes office as chief minister of Jammu and Kashmir in Indian-held Kashmir.
- November 3- Parliamentary elections are held in Turkey. Abdullah Gül would later become prime minister, Yaşar Yakış Foreign Minister.
- November 4- Dennis Fentie is elected Premier of the Yukon.
- November 4- Idrissa Seck is appointed Prime Minister of Senegal.
- November 5- Einars Repše is nominated for Prime Minister of Latvia, and is named Prime Minister 2 days later, Sandra Kalniete becomes Foreign Minister.
- November 5- The Republicans regain control of the Senate and expand their majority in the US House in midterm elections.
- November 6- Peer Steinbrück is elected minister-president of North Rhine-Westphalia.
- November 7- Mikhail Babich is appointed Prime Minister of Chechnya
- November 14- Franco Frattini is appointed foreign minister of Italy.
- November 15- Hu Jintao is appointed general secretary of the Chinese Communist Party.
- November 16- Viktor Yanukovych is asked to be Prime Minister of Ukraine
- November 21- Zafarullah Khan Jamali is elected Prime Minister of Pakistan. He would later name Khurshid Mahmud Kasuri as Foreign Minister.
- November 28- Pavel Bém is elected mayor of Praha.

=== December ===
- December 1- Presidential elections are held in Slovenia; Anton Rop is named prime minister the next day.
- December 1- Laurent Moutinot becomes president of the Council of State of Genève.
- December 2- Frank Murkowski takes office as governor of Alaska; Linda Lingle takes office as governor of Hawaii.
- December 3- Howard Pearce takes office as governor of the Falkland Islands.
- December 3- Elections are held in Greenland, Hans Enoksen would later be sworn in as prime minister.
- December 5- Fernando da Piedade Dias dos Santos is named Prime Minister of Angola.
- December 8- Elections in Serbia fail to receive 50% of the popular vote, making them invalid. Nataša Mićić becomes acting president.
- December 16- Jim Poston is sworn in as governor of the Turks and Caicos Islands.
- December 20- Adnan Terzić is designated prime minister of Bosnia and Herzegovina.
- December 27- Mwai Kibaki wins Presidential elections in Kenya.
- December 27- Ishratul Ibad takes office as governor of Sindh.
- December 30- Mwai Kibaki sworn in as president of Kenya

== Deaths ==
- January 6- Former prime minister of Thailand, Sanya Thammasak.
- January 19- Former prime minister of Finland, Martti Miettunen.
- February 4- Former president of Malta, Agatha Barbara.
- February 8- Former president of Singapore, Ong Teng Cheong.
- March 8- Former prime minister and chairman of the Presidential Council of Benin, Justin Ahomadegbé.
- March 12- Former president of Cyprus, Spyros Kyprianou.
- March 22- Former governor-general of Papua New Guinea, Sir Kingsford Dibela.
- April 16- Former president of Guatemala, Ramiro de León Carpio.
- May 5- Former president of Bolivia, Hugo Banzer Suárez.
- May 5- Former president of Dominica, Sir Clarence Augustus Seignoret.
- May 19- Former prime minister of Australia, Sir John Grey Gorton.
- June 4- Former president of Peru, Fernando Belaúnde Terry.
- June 24- Former prime minister of Luxembourg, Pierre Werner.
- July 13- Former prime minister and foreign minister of Peru, Guillermo Larco Cox.
- July 14- Former president of the Dominican Republic, Joaquín Balaguer.
- July 22- Former prime minister and foreign minister of Peru, Fernando Schwalb López Aldana.
- August 30- Former prime minister of Jordan, Sharif Zaid Ibn Shaker.
- September 8- Former president of Switzerland, Georges-André Chevallaz.
- September 30- Former president of Switzerland, Hans-Peter Tschudi.
- October 31- Former president of Greece, Michail Stasinopoulos.
- December 5- Former prime minister of Myanmar, Ne Win.
- December 22- Former president of Guyana, Desmond Hoyte.
