= 2007 in politics =

== Events ==
=== January ===
- January 1 - Bulgaria and Romania join the European Union.
- January 1 - South Korea's Ban Ki-moon becomes the new UN Secretary-General, replacing Kofi Annan.
- January 1 - Irish (also known as Gaeilge) becomes an official working language of the European Union.
- January 1 - Slovenia adopts the Euro as its official currency, replacing the tolar.
- January 1 - Brazilian president Luiz Inácio Lula da Silva starts his second government term.
- January 2 - Memorial services are held for the late president Gerald Ford in Washington, D.C.
- January 3 - Former U.S. president Gerald Ford is laid to rest in Grand Rapids, Michigan.
- January 4 - The 110th United States Congress is sworn in.
- January 9 - Far-right politicians in the European Parliament form a new trans-national caucus.
- January 10 - Following the 2006 general election, Daniel Ortega becomes the new President of Nicaragua.
- January 11 - Austria's new government is sworn in under Chancellor Alfred Gusenbauer (SPÖ) and Vice-Chancellor Wilhelm Molterer (ÖVP).
- January 14 - The Union for a Popular Movement nominates Nicolas Sarkozy as its candidate to become the next President of France in the 2007 French presidential election.
- January 15 - Rafael Correa becomes President of Ecuador, replacing Alfredo Palacio
- January 16 - Hans-Gert Pöttering, a German conservative politician becomes the President of the European Parliament.
- January 16 - Kyrgyz President Kurmanbek Bakiyev nominates Felix Kulov for Prime Minister.
- January 18 - The United States Senate passes ethics and lobbying reform legislation.
- January 20 - Senator Hillary Clinton announces her intention to run for President of the United States in next year's election.
- January 21 - An election in Serbia gives Ultra-nationalists 81 of the 250 seats in the Serbian Parliament.
- January 22 - Muqtada al-Sadr ends his boycott of the Iraqi political process and rejoins the government.

=== February ===
- February 9 - The Turks and Caicos Islands hold parliamentary elections.
- February 11 - Presidential elections are held in Turkmenistan.
- February 11 - Portugal. An abortion referendum is held in order to decide whether to legalize abortion up to 10 weeks.
- February 14 - Turkmenistan presidential elections. Acting President Gurbanguly Berdimuhamedow, member of The Democratic Party of Turkmenistan, is declared the winner of the election with 89% of votes.
- February 22 - Netherlands. The fourth Balkenende cabinet is installed by Queen Beatrix of the Netherlands.

=== March ===
- March 23 - Royal Navy intrusion into Iranian waters incident. Fifteen British sailors were arrested by the Iranian Revolutionary Guard, for violation of maritime boundary.

=== April ===
- April 3 - Royal Navy intrusion into Iranian waters incident. The 15 sailors arrested in Iranian waters are released.
- April 27 - The Cabinet Office of New South Wales is merged with the Premier's Department of News South Wales to form the New South Wales Department of Premier and Cabinet .

=== May ===
- May 3 - Scottish Parliament Election. The Scottish National Party (SNP) win with one more seat than the incumbent Scottish Labour Party. The election is noted for the controversy over ballot papers and the electoral wipe-out of virtually all of the small parties and independent candidates, except the Scottish Green Party and Margo MacDonald (Ind).
- May 6 - French Presidential election. Nicolas Sarkozy defeats Segolene Royal in the second round of the election for the next President of France.
- May 14 - Scotland. The SNP and the Scottish Green Party reach agreement on their relationship within the Scottish Parliament. Despite hopes that the Greens would enter into coalition or a confidence and supply arrangement with the SNP, the final deal was not quite as encompassing as that model .
- May 16 - French Presidential election. Nicolas Sarkozy is installed as the 23rd President of the French Republic.
- May 24 - Irish General Election. The ruling Fianna Fáil party comes close to an overall majority, winning 78 of the 166 seats in Dáil Éireann. (BBC News)
- May 25 - Victor Yushchenko orders interior ministry troops into the capital amid a deepening political crisis.
- May 26 - Margaret Hodge controversy. UK Trade Minister becomes embroiled in a race-relations disaster after the British National Party say that they agree with her view "that British people should be given priority over migrants for social housing." (BBC News)
- May 27 - Gordon Brown, Chancellor of the Exchequer and Prime minister in-waiting of the UK admits that he believes mistakes were made in the aftermath of the 2003 Iraq war .
- May 27 - Ukrainian political crisis. President Victor Yushchenko and Prime Minister Victor Yanukovych end a deepening political crisis by agreeing to hold elections on 30 September 2007. (BBC News)
- May 29 - 33rd G8 summit. As with many previous G8 summits, the 33rd, being hosted in Germany, is marred by violent clashes between the police and Anti-globalisation demonstrators before it starts. 21 arrests are made and approximately 600 people are injured in riots in the city of Hamburg. (BBC News-Hamburg Police Battle Protesters)
- May 31 - Northern Ireland. Sinn Féin members take their first seats on the Policing Boards of the reformed Royal Ulster Constabulary - the Police Service of Northern Ireland. (BBC News-Sinn Feín's Policing Board Debut)

=== June ===
- June 1 - Scottish Parliament Election. After nearly a month of ignoring the new First Minister of Scotland (Alex Salmond) Gordon Brown finally phones to congratulate Salmond on his electoral success. (BBC News-Chancellor congratulates Salmond)
- June 1 - The European Union (EU) announces that talks with Serbia regarding its joining of the EU are expected to restart sometime in June. (BBC News-EU-Serbia talks 'resume in June')
- June 2 - United Kingdom. Deputy British Prime Minister John Prescott is taken to hospital with a suspected chest infection. (BBC News-Ill Prescott remains in hospital)
- June 4 - Alexander Litvinenko murder. President Vladimir Putin of Russia says that the UK's request for the extradition of Andrei Lugovoi (a former KGB agent) is "pure foolishness". (BBC News-"Litvinenko Demand Foolish"-Putin)
- June 6 - Spain. ETA announces an end to their ceasefire beginning at midnight due to the lack of progress made in negotiations with the Spanish government. (BBC News)
- June 6 - G8 Summit. The USA rejects a Carbon Dioxide emissions reduction agreement while protests continue outside the venue. (BBC News-US Rejects German G8 Climate Goal)
- June 6 - Scotland. Health Secretary Nicola Sturgeon overturns the previous Labour/Liberal Democrats administration's decision to close two Accident and Emergency units at two hospitals. (BBC News-A&E closure decisions overturned)
- June 14 - 2007 Irish general election. Bertie Ahern is re-elected Taoiseach. The new government is a coalition of Fianna Fáil, the Progressive Democrats and the Green Party. (Ahern re-elected as Ireland's PM)
- June 14 - Scottish Parliament. MSPs support a Green Party motion opposing the renewal of the Trident missile system and its siting in Scotland. (MSPs vote against Trident Renewal)
- June 14 - Palestinian Territories. President Mahmoud Abbas dissolves the government in the face of Hamas attacks on government buildings and security forces loyal to Fatah.
- June 15 - EU Constitution. The UK government announces that there will not be a referendum on the revised EU constitution. (BBC News-EU Treaty Referendum is Ruled Out)
- June 15 - Palestinian Territories. President Abbas appoints a new Prime Minister, Salam Fayyad (an independent) and declares a State of emergency. (BBC News-Abbas appoints new Palestinian PM)
- June 15 - Iraq. The USA announces that all troops sent as part of the 2007 "surge" are in place and that the security situation should improve quickly. (BBC News-US Iraq troop surge 'starts now')
- June 15 - Malawi. In the 2007 Malawian political crisis, President Bingu wa Mutharika faces calls for early elections after a judge rules that members of parliament who were elected for other parties before switching to his party (estimated to be 70 out of all 193 sitting MPs) acted illegally. (BBC News-Court blow for Malawi president)
- June 17 - Israel. In an eerie echo of the Hezbollah Israel Conflict of 2006, two Katyusha rockets are fired into Israel from Southern Lebanon, although this is attributed to Palestinian militant groups rather than Hezbollah. (BBC News-Rockets From Lebanon Hit Israel)
- June 24 - Gordon Brown becomes leader of the British Labour Party. Harriet Harman is elected deputy leader of the Labour Party in a surprise result.
- June 27 - Tony Blair resigns as Prime Minister of the United Kingdom. Gordon Brown, former Chancellor of the Exchequer becomes Prime Minister.
- June 29 - Two car bombs are discovered in London, England before they detonate and are defused. (Timeline: Failed Carbomb Attacks)
- June 30 - Glasgow Airport Bombing. A jeep is driven into the front of Glasgow International Airport and is set on fire in a suspected terrorist attack. Other than one of the perpetrators who suffers 90% burns, no one else is injured. (Timeline: Failed Carbomb Attacks)

=== July ===
- July 3 - Red Mosque Siege. Situation begins when female students abduct prostitutes working in the city of Islamabad.
- July 4 - Glasgow Airport Attack. The UK lowers the terrorism threat level from 'critical' to 'severe'.
- July 5 - 2007 Japanese House of Councillors election. The 166th session of the Japanese House of Councillors ends enabling unofficial campaigning for the election to begin.
- July 6 - 2007 National Assembly for Wales election. Welsh Labour Party members endorse a deal that will enable Assembly members to enter into a coalition with Plaid Cymru, despite some opposition from Welsh Labour Members of Parliament and Assembly Members. (BBC News-Labour Agrees Historic Coalition)
- July 6 - 2007 Glasgow International Airport attack. Dr. Bilal Abdullah is charged with conspiracy in relation to the Glasgow airport bombing. (BBC News-Man charged over 'airport bomb')
- July 7 - 2007 National Assembly for Wales election. Plaid Cymru members vote on the One Wales coalition government agreement, leading to its approval.
- July 9 - Iraq and Ankara. Amid a continuing Turkish troop build up along its northern border, the Iraqi Foreign Minister, Hoshiyar Zebari, warns Turkey against crossing Iraq's borders to target Kurdish guerrillas. (BBC News-Iraq fears Turkey troop build-up)
- July 10 - Red Mosque Siege. Pakistani soldiers and special forces storm the Red Mosque after negotiations break down. (BBC News-Pakistani soldiers storm mosque)
- July 11 - The British government announces a review of plans to build a super-casino in Manchester after concerns are raised about building it in an economically deprived area.
- July 12 - 2007 Japanese House of Councillors election. Official campaigning begins for the election to half the seats in Japan's Upper House. (Campaigning Starts in Japan Poll)
- July 29 - 2007 Japanese House of Councillors election. Polling Day.

=== August ===
- August 5 - The 2007 Baja California state elections are held in Baja California, Mexico. José Guadalupe Osuna Millán, a member of the National Action Party of Mexico, wins the gubernatorial election.

=== September ===
- September 7 - Scottish First Minister Alex Salmond marks Green Energy Day by rejecting the UK government's plans to build more nuclear power stations. (BBC News)
- September 30 - Ukrainian parliamentary elections.

=== October ===
- October 15 - Opening of the Seventeenth National Congress of the Chinese Communist Party in the Great Hall of the People.

=== November ===
- November 6 - In the 2007 Pittsburgh mayoral special election, Democratic Incumbent Luke Ravenstahl defeats Republican Mark DeSantis.
- November 24 - Australians elect the Kevin Rudd-led Australian Labor Party from opposition to government at the federal election.

=== December ===
- December 2 - United Russia wins 62.8% of votes in Russia's parliamentary elections.
- December 18 - General elections are held in Bermuda.

== See also ==
- Elections in 2007
- List of years in politics
