= 2006 in politics =

These are some of the notable events relating to politics in 2006.

== Events ==
=== January ===
- January 3 – U.S. lobbyist Jack Abramoff pleads guilty to conspiracy, tax evasion, and mail fraud. His investigation starts a whirlwind of investigations and reforms into U.S. lobbying policies.
- January 4 – Prime Minister Ariel Sharon of Israel suffers a massive stroke, resulting in his authority being transferred to Acting Prime Minister Ehud Olmert.
- January 15
  - A run-off election takes place in Chile for the office of president, resulting in a win for Michelle Bachelet.
  - The first round of Finnish presidential elections take place, resulting in a run-off on January 29.
- January 16 – Ellen Johnson Sirleaf is sworn in as president of Liberia. She becomes the first female elected head of state in Africa.
- January 22
  - Evo Morales is inaugurated as President of Bolivia, becoming the first indigenous president in the nation's history.
  - A parliamentary election takes place in Cape Verde.
  - Presidential elections take place in Portugal, resulting in a win for Aníbal Cavaco Silva.
- January 23 – Stephen Harper's Conservative Party wins the most seats in the Canadian federal election. Harper becomes the 22nd Prime Minister of Canada with a minority government.
- January 25 – Hamas wins a victory in the Palestinian legislative election, taking 76 of the 132 seats.
- January 27 – Elections for the legislative body, the Estates, take place in the Netherlands Antilles.
- January 29
  - Sheikh Sabah Al-Ahmad Al-Jaber Al-Sabah is sworn in as the Emir of Kuwait.
  - Tarja Halonen is elected President of Finland following a run-off election against Sauli Niinistö.

=== February ===
- February 2 – Representative John Boehner of Ohio becomes the U.S. House Majority Leader, beating out acting majority leader Roy Blunt in a house vote.
- February 3 – Dutch D66 party chairman Boris Dittrich resigns because the Dutch Government voted 'Yes' to Dutch participation in a NATO-led ISAF operation in Afghanistan.
- February 4 – Twenty-seven out of 35 countries on the IAEA's Board of Governors vote to refer the nuclear program of Iran to the United Nations Security Council out of concern over Iran's plans to enrich nuclear materials and to refuse IAEA inspection of the process.
- February 5 – Costa Rica holds a presidential election. The results are deemed too close to call, resulting in a manual count of votes that would not be completed until March 7.
- February 7 – Haiti holds a general election to replace the interim government of Gerard Latortue. The 129 member Haitian parliament is also elected at this time.
- February 8
  - Chad and Sudan sign the Tripoli Agreement, ending the Chadian-Sudanese conflict.
  - Heather Wilson, a New Mexico Congresswoman with NSA oversight authority, becoming the first Republican on an intelligence committee to call for a congressional investigation into Bush's warrantless wiretap program.
- February 11 – Tokelau begins voting in a referendum to determine whether it remains a New Zealand territory, or becomes a state in free association with New Zealand.
- February 12 – Presidential elections are held in Cape Verde, resulting in Pedro Pires being elected to office.
- February 15 – In a case of apparent electoral fraud, hundreds of ballot boxes are discovered in a garbage dump in Haiti, throwing the results of the elections there in doubt.
- February 23 – General elections are held in Uganda, resulting in the election of Yoweri Museveni to a third term.
- February 24 – In an attempt to subdue a possible military coup, Philippine President Gloria Macapagal Arroyo declares Proclamation 1017, placing the country in a state of emergency.

=== March ===
- March 11 – Michelle Bachelet is sworn in as the first female President of Chile.

=== April ===
- April 9 – Israeli Prime Minister Ariel Sharon is removed from office after 4 months in a coma.
- April 10 – Romano Prodi defeats Silvio Berlusconi in a close race in the Italian parliamentary elections.
- April 11 – President of Iran, Mahmoud Ahmadinejad, confirms that Iran has successfully produced a few grams of 3.5% low-grade enriched uranium.
- April 19 – Han Myung-sook becomes South Korea's first female prime minister.
- April 26 – Tony Snow replaces Scott McClellan as the U.S. White House Press Secretary

=== May ===
- May 24 – East Timor's Foreign Minister Horta officially requests military assistance from the governments of Australia, New Zealand, Malaysia and Portugal.
- May 28 – President Álvaro Uribe Vélez is re-elected in Colombia for a second term. He becomes the first president in over a century to serve consecutive terms.

=== June ===
- June 10 – Palestinian President Mahmoud Abbas sets July 26 as the date for a national referendum in the Palestinian National Authority.

=== July ===
- July 2 – A presidential election is held in Mexico. Felipe Calderón is confirmed as the winner on September 5.
- July 14 – Jarosław Kaczyński, leader of the Law and Justice party, is sworn in as Prime Minister of Poland by his identical twin, President Lech Kaczyński.
- July 28 – Alejandro Toledo concludes his term as President of Peru. Alan García becomes president.
- July 31 – Fidel Castro, President of Cuba, temporarily relinquishes power to his brother Raúl before surgery.

=== August ===
- August 3 – Tuvalu holds parliamentary elections.
- August 4 – Viktor Yanukovych begins his term as Prime Minister of Ukraine.
- August 5 – The Republic of China (Taiwan) severs diplomatic relations with Chad reducing the number of countries maintaining official relations with it to 24. The ROC foreign ministry cited Chad's intention to establish relations with the People's Republic of China as the reason.
- August 6 – The Déby administration of Chad establishes official relations with the People's Republic of China. Chad had recognized the Republic of China (Taiwan) from 1997 to 2006. Chadian diplomats cited the prospects of greater financial investments and the PRC status in the United Nations Security Council as the principal factors motivating the diplomatic shift.
- August 9 – A partial recount of votes in the disputed 2006 Mexico presidential election, which was held on July 2, begins amid escalating protests against alleged electoral irregularities in the close election.
- August 10 – A major terrorist plot to destroy aircraft travelling from the United Kingdom to the United States is disrupted by Scotland Yard.
- August 14 – The 2006 Lebanon War cease fire goes into effect.
- August 28 – Mexico's Federal Electoral Tribunal rules unanimously that results in contested polling stations only marginally affected the lead of Felipe Calderón of the ruling National Action Party over Andrés Manuel López Obrador in July's disputed presidential election.

=== September ===
- September 1 – Bob O'Connor mayor of Pittsburgh, Pennsylvania, dies from a brain tumor and Pittsburgh City Council president Luke Ravenstahl is sworn in as the youngest mayor of any major American city.
- September 7 – Tony Blair announces that he would step down as Labour leader by the time of the TUC conference in September 2007
- September 17 – The Alliance for Sweden achieves a majority victory in the 2006 Swedish general election.
- September 19 – Thaksin Shinawatra, Prime Minister of Thailand, is deposed in a coup staged by the Royal Thai Army.
- September 23 – Toomas Hendrik Ilves is elected President of Estonia.
- September 26 – Shinzō Abe is elected as new Prime Minister of Japan by the Diet of Japan, succeeding Junichiro Koizumi.
- September 29 – US Representative Mark Foley (R-FL) resigns after allegations of inappropriate emails to house pages were introduced.

=== October ===
- October 9 – North Korea claims to have successfully conducted its first ever nuclear test.
- October 15 – The UN agrees to sanction North Korea over nuclear testing issue.
- October 15 – Chief Justice of Japan Akira Machida retires after turning the age of 70.
- October 29 – Luiz Inácio Lula da Silva is re-elected President of Brazil.
- October 30 – Former Chilean Dictator Augusto Pinochet is placed under house arrest for crimes committed at the Villa Grimaldi detention centre where thousands were tortured between 1974 and 1977.

=== November ===
- Former Iraqi dictator, Saddam Hussein is sentenced to death by hanging, along with two of his senior allies. He is also found guilty of crimes against humanity.
- November 7 – The Republican Party suffers losses in the United States midterm elections. They lose control of the House of Representatives and the Senate to the Democrats. Nancy Pelosi becomes first female Speaker of the House being the closest a woman has been in succession of the president.
- November 8 – Donald Rumsfeld resigns from his post as Secretary of Defense. Bob Gates is named his successor.
- November 9 – Leftist Daniel Ortega is elected President of Nicaragua
- November 12 – Gerald Ford surpasses Ronald Reagan as the longest lived U.S. President.

=== December ===
- December 1 – Felipe Calderón sworn in as the 73rd President of Mexico by the Congress in Mexico.
- December 3 – 2006 presidential elections re-elects Hugo Chávez as President of the Bolivarian Republic of Venezuela, with nearly 63% of the vote.
- December 30 – Former Iraqi dictator, Saddam Hussein is hanged.

== Deaths ==
(Partial list of politicians who died in 2006)

- January 20 – Andrei Iordan, former prime minister of Kyrgyzstan
- January 21 – Ibrahim Rugova, president of Kosovo, lung cancer
- January 25 – Sudharmono, vice president of Indonesia from 1988 to 1993
- January 27 – Johannes Rau, president of Germany from 1999 to 2004
- February 1 – Samuel Pearson Goddard, Jr., American politician, governor of Arizona 1965–1967.
- February 15 – Sun Yun-suan, former Premier of Republic of China, myocardial infarction
- February 22 – Said Mohamed Djohar, former President of Comoros
- March 11 – Slobodan Milošević, former President of the Federal Republic of Yugoslavia
- March 14 – Lennart Meri, former President of Estonia
- March 15 – George Rallis, former Prime Minister of Greece
- March 28 – Caspar Weinberger, former U.S. Secretary of Defense & Secretary of Health
- April 9 – Georges Rawiri, president of the Gabon senate
- April 23 – Ghafar Baba, Malaysian former Deputy Prime Minister
- April 27 – Alexander Buel Trowbridge, former U.S. Secretary of Commerce
- May 12 – Hussein Maziq, former prime minister & foreign minister of Libya
- May 15 – Chic Hecht, former senator of Nevada
- May 27 – Romeo Lucas García, former President of Guatemala
- June 8 – Sir Peter Smithers, member of the British Parliament
- June 10 – Qadi Abdul Karim Abdullah Al-Arashi, former President of North Yemen.
- June 27 – J. Robert Elliott, United States Federal District Judge
- December 26 – Gerald Ford, 38th President of the United States
- December 30 – Saddam Hussein

== See also ==
- Elections in 2006
- Electoral calendar 2006
- list of years in politics
