= 2000 in politics =

These are some of the notable events relating to politics in 2000.

== Events ==
=== January ===
- January 3–10 – Israel and Syria hold inconclusive peace talks.
- January 5–8 – The 2000 al-Qaeda Summit of several high-level al-Qaeda members (including two 9/11 American Airlines hijackers) is held in Kuala Lumpur, Malaysia.
- January 11 – The armed wing of the Islamic Salvation Front concludes its negotiations with the government for an amnesty and disbands in Algeria (see Algerian Civil War#GIA destroyed, GSPC discontinues).
- January 14 – A United Nations tribunal sentences 5 Bosnian Croats to up to 25 years in prison for the 1993 killing of over 100 Bosnian Muslims in a Bosnian village.
- January 24 – God's Army, a Karen militia group led by twins Johnny and Luther Htoo, takes 700 hostages at a Thai hospital near the Burmese border.

=== February ===
- February 5 - Mass murder of Chechen civilians by Russian forces in the Novye Aldi massacre.
- February 6 – Tarja Halonen is elected the first female president of Finland.
- February 7 – Stipe Mesić is elected president of Croatia.

=== March ===
- March 1
  - The Constitution of Finland is rewritten.
  - Jorge Batlle, a son, grandnephew and great-grandson of former presidents, is sworn in as President of Uruguay.
- March 21
  - Pope John Paul II begins the first official visit by a Roman Catholic pontiff to Israel.
  - The U.S. Supreme Court rules the FDA lacks authority to regulate tobacco as an addictive drug, throwing out the Clinton Administration's main anti-smoking initiative.
- March 26 – Vladimir Putin is elected President of Russia.

=== April ===
- April 16 – An American anti-globalization protest is held in Washington, D.C.
- April 17 – Tuanku Syed Sirajuddin becomes Raja of Perlis.

=== May ===
- May – Sierra Leone Civil War: The British Armed Forces launch Operation Palliser to support the Sierra Leone government to counter the Revolutionary United Front.
- May 11 – Effective date of Canada's first modern-day treaty – The Nisga'a Final Agreement.
- May 16 – The Grand National Assembly of Turkey elects Ahmet Necdet Sezer as the tenth President of Turkey.
- May 20 – Taiwanese (ROC) president Chen Shui-bian makes the Four Noes and One Without pledge to Taiwan.
- May 25 – Israel withdraws IDF forces from southern Lebanon after 22 years.

=== June ===
- June 13 – South Korean President Kim Dae-jung visits North Korea to participate in the first North-South presidential summit.
- June 21 – Section 28, a law preventing the promotion of homosexuality, is repealed by the Scottish Parliament.

=== July ===
- July 2 – Vicente Fox is elected President of Mexico, as candidate of the rightist PAN (National Action Party), ending 71 years of PRI (Institutional Revolutionary Party) rule.
- July 10 – Bashar al-Assad is confirmed as Syria's leader in a national referendum following the death of his father, Hafez al-Assad.
- July 13–25 – Israel's prime minister Ehud Barak and PLO leader Yasser Arafat meet at Camp David, but fail to reach an agreement.
- July 18 – Alex Salmond resigns as the leader of the Scottish National Party.
- July 21–23 – G-8 Nations hold their 26th Annual Summit; issues include AIDS, the 'digital divide', and halving world poverty by 2015.
- July 30 – Venezuela's president Hugo Chávez is reelected with 59% of the vote.
- July 31 – August 3 – The Republican National Convention in Philadelphia nominates Governor of Texas George W. Bush for President of the United States and Dick Cheney for Vice President.

=== August ===
- August 14–17 – The Democratic National Convention in Los Angeles nominates U.S. Vice President Al Gore for President and Senator Joe Lieberman for Vice President.

=== September ===
- September 5 – Tuvalu joins the United Nations.
- September 8
  - Albania officially joins the World Trade Organization.
  - The United Nations Millennium Declaration is made in New York
- September 16 – Peru's president Alberto Fujimori calls for new elections in which he will not run.
- September 26 – Anti-globalization protests in Prague (some 15,000 protesters) turn violent during the IMF and World Bank summits.
- September 28 – Israeli opposition leader Ariel Sharon visits the Temple Mount, protected by a several-hundred-strong Israeli police force. Palestinian riots erupt, leading to a full-fledged armed uprising (called the Al-Aqsa Intifada by sympathizers and the Oslo War by opponents).

=== October ===
- October 5 – President Slobodan Milošević leaves office after widespread demonstrations throughout Serbia.
- October 11 – Jim Wallace becomes Acting First Minister of Scotland.
- October 21 – Fifteen Arab leaders convene in Cairo, Egypt, for their first summit in 4 years; the Libyan delegation walks out, angry over signs the summit will stop short of calling for breaking ties with Israel.
- October 23 – Madeleine Albright holds talks with North Korean dictator Kim Jong-il.
- October 27
  - Pacific Islands Forum (PIF).
  - Henry McLeish becomes First Minister of Scotland.

=== November ===
- November – Iraq disarmament crisis: Iraq rejects new U.N. Security Council weapons inspections proposals.
- November 1 – Serbia is admitted to the United Nations as the 190th member.
- November 7
  - Hillary Clinton is elected to the United States Senate, becoming the first First Lady of the United States to win public office.
  - 2000 United States presidential election: Republican Governor of Texas George W. Bush defeats Democratic Vice President Al Gore in the U.S. presidential election. However, the discovery of a miscount in Florida leads to a recount of the votes.
- November 15 – A new Indian state called Jharkhand is formed, carving out the South Chhota Nagpur area from Bihar in India.
- November 16 – Bill Clinton becomes the first sitting U.S. President to visit Vietnam since the end of the Vietnam War in 1975.
- November 17 – Alberto Fujimori is removed from office as president of Peru.
- November 27 – Jean Chrétien is re-elected as Prime Minister of Canada, as the Liberal Party of Canada increases its majority in the House of Commons of Canada.
- November 28 – Ukrainian politician Oleksandr Moroz touches off the Cassette Scandal by publicly accusing President Leonid Kuchma of involvement in the murder of journalist Georgiy Gongadze. The accusation creates the Orange Revolution in 2004.

=== December ===
- December 1 – Vicente Fox takes office as President of Mexico.
- December 12 – Bush v. Gore: The U.S. Supreme Court stops the Florida presidential recount, effectively giving the state, and the Presidency, to George W. Bush.
- December 24 – Christmas Eve 2000 Indonesia bombings: At least 18 people are killed in multiple Islamist bomb attacks on churches across Indonesia.
- December 30 – Rizal Day bombings: A series of bombs explode in various places in Metro Manila, Philippines, within a span of a few hours, killing 22 and injuring about 100.

== Births ==
October 15 – Melki Sedek Huang, Indonesian political activist and sex offender
