= 2001 in politics =

These are some of the notable events relating to politics in 2001.

== Events ==
=== January ===
- January 1 – Greece becomes the 12th country to join the Eurozone.
- January 20
  - George W. Bush is sworn in as the 43rd President of the United States.
  - Impeachment proceedings against Philippine President Joseph Estrada, accused of playing Jueteng, end preeminently and trigger the second EDSA People Power Revolution (or People Power II). Vice President Gloria Macapagal Arroyo succeeds him as the 14th president of the Philippines.
- January 21 – Taba Summit: Talks between Israel and the Palestinian National Authority begin in Egypt.
- January 22 – The 2001 insurgency in Macedonia begins when a police station is shelled by the National Liberation Army in Tearce, near the border with Kosovo.
- January 29 – Corruption scandals surrounding Indonesian President Abdurrahman Wahid prompt thousands of protesters to storm the Indonesian parliament building.

=== February ===
- February 6 – 2001 Israeli prime ministerial election: Ariel Sharon of the Likud party is elected Prime Minister of Israel.
- February 16 – Iraq disarmament crisis: British and U.S. forces carry out bombing raids, attempting to disable Iraq's air defense network.
- February 18 – FBI agent Robert Hanssen is arrested and charged with spying for Russia for 25 years.

=== March ===
- March 28 – The United States declares its intention to end involvement in the Kyoto Protocol.

=== April ===
- April 1
  - Hainan Island incident: A Chinese fighter jet bumps into a U.S. EP-3E surveillance aircraft, which is forced to make an emergency landing in Hainan, China. The U.S. crew is detained for 10 days and the F-8 Chinese pilot, Wang Wei, goes missing and is presumed dead.
  - The Act on the Opening up of Marriage goes into effect in the Netherlands, which becomes the first modern country to legalize same-sex marriage.
- April 2 – Former President of Serbia and Montenegro Slobodan Milošević surrenders to police special forces to be tried on charges of crimes against humanity.
- April 17
  - Nông Đức Mạnh is chosen as General Secretary of the Communist Party of Vietnam.
  - Israel occupies an area in the Gaza Strip, killing two people. Israeli forces withdraw the same day after the United States denounces the attack.
- April 26
  - Junichiro Koizumi becomes the 86th Prime Minister of Japan.
  - The Parliament of Ukraine votes to dismiss Prime Minister Viktor Yushchenko.

=== May ===
- May 13 – Silvio Berlusconi wins the general election and becomes Prime Minister of Italy for the second time.
- May 22 – The Stockholm Convention on Persistent Organic Pollutants is adopted by 127 countries to limit pollution internationally.
- May 26 – The African Union is formed to replace the Organisation of African Unity. It will begin operation the following year.
- May 28 – 2001 Central African Republic coup d'état attempt: Central African forces led by André Kolingba carry out a failed attempt to overthrow the government of the Central African Republic. Dozens are killed in the ensuing violence.

=== June ===
- June 1 – Crown Prince Dipendra of Nepal kills his father, the king, his mother and other members of the royal family with an assault rifle and then shoots himself in the Nepalese royal massacre. Dipendra is recognized as King of Nepal while in a coma.
- June 4 – Gyanendra ascends the throne of Nepal on the death of his nephew, Dipendra.
- June 6 – U.S. Senator Jim Jeffords of Vermont leaves Republican party to caucus as an independent with Democrats, handing majority control of the Senate to the Democratic Party and Majority Leader Tom Daschle.
- June 7 –
  - George W. Bush signs the Economic Growth and Tax Relief Reconciliation Act of 2001, the first tax cut of a series now known as the Bush tax cuts.
  - 2001 United Kingdom general election: Tony Blair and the Labour Party win a second landslide victory.
  - Former Argentinian president Carlos Menem is arrested on suspicion of illegal arms sales.
- June 15 – Declaration to establish the Shanghai Cooperation Organisation is signed.

=== July ===
- July 7 – 2001 Bradford riots: Ethnic violence is provoked in Bradford, England, by the far-right National Front and far-left Anti-Nazi League.
- July 14 – Agra Summit: India and Pakistan begin talks to improve relations. The summit ends inconclusively on July 16.
- July 16 – China and Russia sign the 2001 Sino-Russian Treaty of Friendship.
- July 19 – UK politician and novelist Jeffrey Archer is sentenced to 4 years in prison for perjury and perverting the course of justice.
- July 20–22 – The 27th G8 summit takes place in Genoa, Italy. Massive demonstrations, drawing an estimated 200,000 people, are held against the meeting by members of the anti-globalization movement. One demonstrator, Carlo Giuliani, is killed by a policeman, and several others are injured.
- July 23 – Megawati Sukarnoputri is inaugurated as the first female president of Indonesia.
- July 24 – Simeon Saxe-Coburg-Gotha, deposed as the last Tsar of Bulgaria when a child, is sworn in as the democratically elected 48th Prime Minister of Bulgaria.

=== August ===
- August 1 – Alabama Supreme Court Chief Justice Roy Moore has a Ten Commandments monument installed in the judiciary building, leading to a lawsuit to have it removed and his own removal from office.
- August 10 – The United States and the United Kingdom bomb air force installations in Iraq in response to attacks on American and British planes.
- August 13 – Macedonian and Albanian representatives sign the Ohrid Agreement to reduce conflicts during the insurgency.
- August 21 – Operation Essential Harvest: NATO sends a military forces to the Republic of Macedonia in response to the ongoing insurgency.
- August 31 – The World Conference against Racism 2001 begins in Durban, South Africa.

=== September ===
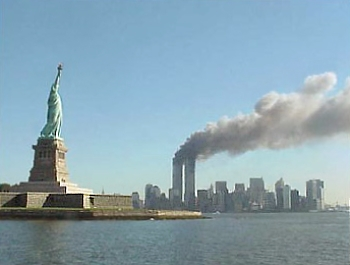
September 11 attacks

- September 3
  - In Belfast, Protestant loyalists begin a picket of Holy Cross, a Catholic primary school for girls. For the next 11 weeks, riot police escort the schoolchildren and their parents through hundreds of protesters, amid rioting and heightened violence.
  - The United States, Canada and Israel withdraw from the U.N. Conference on Racism because they feel that the issue of Zionism is overemphasized.
- September 9 – A suicide bomber kills Ahmad Shah Massoud, military commander of the Afghan Northern Alliance.
- September 10 – Antônio da Costa Santos, mayor of Campinas, Brazil is assassinated.
- September 11 – 2,977 victims are killed in the September 11 attacks at the World Trade Center in New York City, New York, The Pentagon in Arlington County, Virginia, and in rural Shanksville, Pennsylvania after American Airlines Flight 11 and United Airlines Flight 175 are hijacked and crash into the World Trade Center's Twin Towers, American Airlines Flight 77 is hijacked and crashes into the Pentagon, and United Airlines Flight 93 is hijacked and crashes into grassland in Shanksville, due to the passengers fighting to regain control of the airplane. The World Trade Center towers collapse as a result of the crashes.
- September 19 – Palestinian leader Yasser Arafat forbids Palestinian soldiers from firing on Israeli forces, even in self-defence. Israel agrees to a ceasefire.
- September 20 – In an address to a joint session of Congress and the American people, U.S. President George W. Bush declares a "war on terror".
- September 26 – One third of the French Senate is elected in the 2001 French Senate election.

=== October ===
- October 1 – Militants attack the state legislature building in Srinagar, Kashmir, killing 38.
- October 4 – 2001 Kodori crisis: Fighting escalates between Georgia and the breakaway state Abkhazia.
- October 7 – United States invasion of Afghanistan: In response to the September 11 attacks, Afghanistan is invaded by a US-led coalition, beginning the War in Afghanistan.
- October 8 – U.S. President George W. Bush announces the establishment of the Office of Homeland Security.
- October 17 – Israeli tourism minister Rehavam Ze'evi becomes the first Israeli minister to be assassinated in a terrorist attack.
- October 23 – The Provisional Irish Republican Army of Northern Ireland commences disarmament after peace talks.
- October 25 – Citing connotations with the Rwandan genocide, the government of Rwanda adopts a new national flag for the country.
- October 26 – U.S. President George W. Bush signs the Patriot Act into law.

=== November ===
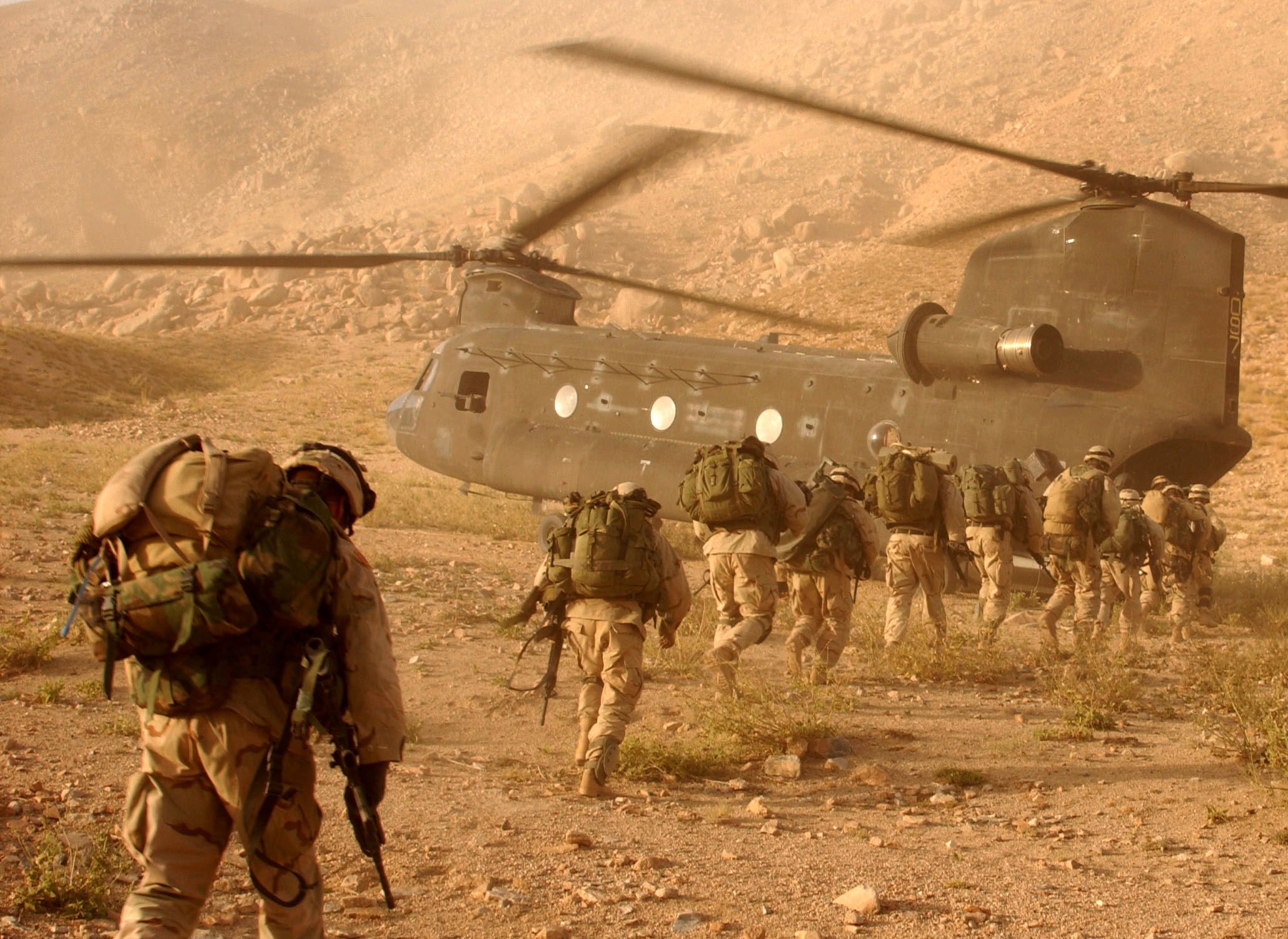
Soldiers board a Chinook helicopter

- November 4 – The Police Service of Northern Ireland is established, replacing the controversial Royal Ulster Constabulary.
- November 10 – John Howard, the Prime Minister of Australia, is elected to a third term.
- November 13 – In the first such act since World War II, U.S. President George W. Bush signs an executive order allowing military tribunals against any foreigners suspected of having connections to terrorist acts or planned acts against the United States.
- November 14 – Fall of Kabul: Northern Alliance forces take the Afghan capital Kabul.
- November 23 – The Budapest Convention on Cybercrime is signed in Budapest, Hungary.

=== December ===
- December – The International Commission on Intervention and State Sovereignty produces a report on Responsibility to protect.
- December 3 – Officials announce that one of the Taliban prisoners captured after the prison uprising at Mazar-i-Sharif, Afghanistan is John Walker Lindh, a United States citizen.
- December 6 – Fall of Kandahar: The Taliban surrenders in Kandahar, its final stronghold.
- December 11
  - The United States government indicts Zacarias Moussaoui for involvement in the September 11 attacks.
  - The United States Customs Service raids members of international software piracy group DrinkOrDie in Operation Buccaneer.
- December 13
  - 2001 Indian Parliament attack: 12 are killed, leading to a 2001–02 India–Pakistan standoff.
  - U.S. President George W. Bush announces the US withdrawal from the 1972 Anti-Ballistic Missile Treaty.
- December 22 – Burhanuddin Rabbani, political leader of the Northern Alliance, hands over power in Afghanistan to the interim government headed by President Hamid Karzai.
- December 27 – China is granted permanent normal trade status with the United States.

== Deaths ==
- January 2 – William P. Rogers, American diplomat (b. 1913)
- January 7 – Charles Helou, 9th president of Lebanon (b. 1913)
- January 9 – Paul Vanden Boeynants, 2-time prime minister of Belgium (b. 1919)
- January 18 – Laurent-Désiré Kabila, president of the Democratic Republic of the Congo (b. 1939) (see assassination of Laurent-Désiré Kabila)
- January 27 – Marie-José of Belgium, last Queen of Italy (b. 1906)
- February 6 – Trần Văn Lắm, South Vietnamese diplomat and politician (b. 1913)
- March 4 – Harold Stassen, American politician, 25th Governor of Minnesota (b. 1907)
- March 20 – Ilie Verdeț, 51st prime minister of Romania (b. 1925)
- April 20 – Va'ai Kolone, Prime Minister of Samoa (b. 1911)
- April 29 – Barend Biesheuvel, Prime Minister of the Netherlands (1971–1973) (b. 1920)
- May 22 – Jenő Fock, 49th prime minister of Hungary (b. 1916)
- June 1 – Nepalese royal massacre:
  - Queen Aishwarya of Nepal (b. 1949)
  - King Birendra of Nepal (b. 1944)
  - Prince Nirajan of Nepal (b. 1978)
  - Princess Shruti of Nepal (b. 1976)
- June 4 – King Dipendra of Nepal (b. 1971)
- June 7 – Víctor Paz Estenssoro, 45th President of Bolivia (b. 1907)
- June 10 – Leila Pahlavi, Iranian princess (b. 1970)
- July 10 – Álvaro Magaña, 38th President of El Salvador (b. 1925)
- July 25
  - Phoolan Devi, Indian politician (b. 1963)
  - Josef Klaus, 16th Chancellor of Austria (b. 1910)
- July 29 – Edward Gierek, Polish politician (b. 1913)
- July 31 – Francisco da Costa Gomes, 15th President of Portugal (b. 1914)
- August 6 – Dương Văn Minh, 4th and final President of the Republic of Vietnam (South Vietnam) (b. 1916)
- August 11 – Carlos Hank González, Mexican politician (b. 1927)
- August 26 – Marita Petersen, 8th prime minister of Faroe Islands (b. 1940)
- August 27 – Abu Ali Mustafa, PFLP leader (b. 1938)
- August 30 – A. F. M. Ahsanuddin Chowdhury, 9th president of Bangladesh (b. 1915)
- September 9 – Ahmad Shah Massoud, Afghan military commander (b. 1953)
- September 20 – Marcos Pérez Jiménez, 51st President of Venezuela (b. 1914)
- September 29 – Nguyễn Văn Thiệu, 2nd President of the Republic of Vietnam (South Vietnam) (b. 1923)
- October 5 – Mike Mansfield, American politician and diplomat (b. 1903)
- October 15 – Zhang Xueliang, Chinese military figure (b. 1901)
- October 17 – Rehavam Ze'evi, Israeli general and politician (b. 1926) (see assassination of Rehavam Ze'evi)
- October 25 – Soraya Esfandiary-Bakhtiary, Queen consort of Iran (b. 1932)
- November – Mohammed Atef, Al-Qaeda leader (b. 1944)
- November 1 – Juan Bosch, President of the Dominican Republic (b. 1909)
- November 5 – Gholam Reza Azhari, 73rd prime minister of Iran (b. 1912)
- November 9 – Giovanni Leone, 37th Prime Minister of Italy and 6th President of Italy (b. 1908)
- November 24 – Sophie, Princess of Greece and Denmark (b. 1914)
- December 20 – Léopold Sédar Senghor, first president of Senegal (b. 1906)
- December 23 – Jelle Zijlstra, Dutch politician and economist, Prime Minister of the Netherlands (b. 1918)
