= 2004 in politics =

These are some of the notable events relating to politics in 2004.

== Events ==
=== January ===
- January 1- Adnan Pachachi becomes president of the Iraq Interim Governing Council and will serve for the duration of the month.
- January 1 – Joseph Deiss takes office as President of the Confederation in Switzerland, Samuel Schmid as vice-president.
- January 4 – Texas Congressman Ralph Hall switches to the Republicans. Hall had been a Democrat.
- January 4 – Mikhail Saakashvili is elected as President of Georgia.
- January 6 – 2000 Democratic Presidential Candidate Bill Bradley endorses fellow Democrat Howard Dean for president.
- January 8 – Gavin Newsom is sworn in as Mayor of San Francisco.
- January 8 – Roosevelt Skerrit is sworn in as Prime Minister of Dominica following the death of Pierre Charles on January 6.
- January 12 – Kathleen Babineaux Blanco is sworn in as Governor of Louisiana.
- January 13 – Haley Barbour is sworn in as Governor of Mississippi.
- January 13 – Howard Dean wins a non-binding primary in Washington, D.C., with 43% of the vote. Al Sharpton comes in second with 34% of the vote.
- January 13 – Former Treasury Secretary Paul O'Neill contributes to a book that claims that George W. Bush wanted to attack Iraq since January 2001 and not after the September 11th terrorist attacks as had been believed.
- January 13 – The Turkish Cypriot leader approves a new cabinet headed by Mehmet Ali Talat.
- January 14 – Óscar Berger Perdomo is inaugurated as President of Guatemala. Eduardo Stein Barillas becomes vice president and Jorge Briz Abularach becomes foreign minister.
- January 14 – Madan Lal Khurana is sworn in as governor of Rajasthan.
- January 14 – Nikolay Shaklein is sworn in as governor of Kirov.
- January 15 – Carol Moseley Braun drops out of the 2004 United States Presidential race and endorses Howard Dean.
- January 16 – Ban Ki-moon is named foreign minister of South Korea.
- January 19 – The Iowa Caucuses are held. John Kerry wins with 38%. John Edwards comes second with 32%. Howard Dean comes in third with 18%. Richard A. "Dick" Gephardt comes in fourth with 11%.
- January 20 – Richard Gephardt quits the 2004 Presidential race after a poor showing in the Iowa Caucuses.
- January 20 – Bill Janklow's resignation from Congress takes effect. Janklow had been convicted of a felony in December 2003.
- January 25 – Mikhail Saakashvili is sworn in as President of Georgia.
- January 27 – John Kerry wins the New Hampshire Primary with 38% of the vote. Howard Dean gets 26% of the vote.
- January 27 – Don Brash Speech Orewa Rotary Club on Nationhood against Māori racial separatism in New Zealand
- January 27 – A House of Commons vote on University tuition top-up fees is narrowly won by the British Government. It is, however, the worst voting result for Tony Blair since he came to power in 1997.

=== February ===
- February 1- Jörg Schild becomes president of the government of Basel-Stadt.
- February 3 – John Edwards wins a primary in South Carolina with 46% of the vote. Wesley Clark wins the Oklahoma primary with 30% of the vote. John Kerry wins primaries and caucuses in Arizona with 43% of the vote, Delaware with 50% of the vote, Missouri with 51% of the vote, New Mexico with 42% of the vote, and North Dakota with 50% of the vote.
- February 3 – Joe Lieberman quits the Presidential race after poor results in primaries and caucuses in South Carolina, Oklahoma, Arizona, Delaware, Missouri, North Dakota, and New Mexico.
- February 3 – Jóannes Eidesgaard becomes prime minister of the Faroe Islands.
- February 4 – Andrei Stratan is appointed foreign minister of Moldova.
- February 4 – Dragan Marsicanin becomes acting president of Serbia.
- February 6 – Richard Gephardt endorses John Kerry for President.
- February 7 – John Kerry wins a primary in Michigan with 52% of the vote. Kerry also wins the Washington primary with 49% of the vote.
- February 7 – Peter Beattie (of the Australian Labor Party) wins a 3rd term as Premier of Queensland, again winning over two-thirds of the seats.
- February 8 – John Kerry wins the Maine Caucuses with 45% of the vote.
- February 10 – John Kerry wins primaries in Tennessee and Virginia with 41% and 52% of the vote, respectively.
- February 11 – Wesley Clark quits the Presidential race after poor results in the Virginia and Tennessee primaries.
- February 13 – Wesley Clark endorses John Kerry.
- February 13 – Jesús Pérez is sworn in as foreign minister of Venezuela.
- February 13 – Tassos Giannitsis is sworn in as caretaker foreign minister of Greece.
- February 14 – John Kerry wins a caucus in Washington, D.C., with 47% of the vote. Kerry wins the Nevada caucus with 63% of state party delegates.
- February 17 – Democrat Ben Chandler defeats Republican Alice Forgy Kerr in a Congressional special election in Kentucky with 55% of the vote compared to Forgy Kerr's 43%.
- February 17 – John Kerry wins 40% of the vote in the Wisconsin primary.
- February 17 – Luisa Diogo is named prime minister of Mozambique.
- February 18 – Howard Dean quits the Presidential race after a poor showing in Wisconsin.
- February 18 – Jacques Simonet is sworn in as minister-president of Brussels-Capital.
- February 21 – Ralph Nader enters the Presidential race as an Independent.
- February 23 – Paul Lennon becomes acting premier of Tasmania.
- February 23 – Mamady Condé is named foreign minister of Guinea.
- February 23 – Josep Bargalló takes office as chief councillor of Catalonia.
- February 24 – Viktor Khristenko is named acting prime minister of Russia.
- February 26 – Ljupčo Jordanovski becomes acting president of Republic of Macedonia.
- February 28 – Sulejman Tihić becomes chairman of the Presidency of Bosnia and Herzegovina.
- February 29 – Boniface Alexandre is sworn in as provisional president of Haiti.

=== March ===
- March 2 – "Super Tuesday" U.S. presidential primaries or caucuses take place in California, Connecticut, Georgia, Maryland, Massachusetts, Minnesota, New York, Ohio, Rhode Island and Vermont. John Kerry wins in 9 states, and a dejected John Edwards quits the race.
- March 3 – New Government of Serbia was formed with support of Milošević's SPS party
- March 4 – national parliament and all state assemblies of Malaysia, except Sarawak's were dissolved by the Prime Minister, paving the way for the general election.
- March 4 – Predrag Marković becomes acting President of Serbia.
- March 5 – Mikhail Fradkov is confirmed as Prime Minister of Russia.
- March 7 – Kostas Karamanlis is given the mandate to form a new government in Greece.
- March 9 – Sergey Lavrov is appointed Foreign Minister of Russia.
- March 9 – Petros Molyviatis becomes Foreign Minister of Greece.
- March 9 – Parliament of Latvia approves a new government headed by Indulis Emsis, Rihards Piks becomes foreign minister.
- March 11 – Salomé Zurabishvili is appointed as foreign minister of the Republic of Georgia.
- March 12 – Oleg Chirkunov becomes new acting governor of Perm.
- March 12 – Gérard Latortue is sworn in as Prime Minister of Haiti.
- March 13 – Nomination day for the Malaysian general election. Barisan Nasional wins 15 parliamentary seats and 7 state assembly seats uncontested. The Pan-Malaysian Islamic Party settles for one seat in the state of Johor.
- March 16 – Sergey Abaramov is appointed as Prime Minister of Chechnya.
- March 21 – National Front scores a landslide victory in the Malaysian general election.
- March 23 – Lawrence Gonzi is sworn in as Prime Minister of Malta. John Dalli becomes foreign minister.
- March 24 – Baldwin Spencer is sworn in as Prime Minister of Antigua and Barbuda. Harold Lovell becomes Foreign Minister.
- March 25 – Datuk Idris Jusoh is sworn in as chief minister of Terengganu.
- March 31 – Michel Barnier becomes foreign minister of France.

=== April ===
- April 1 – Paolo Bollini and Marino Riccardi take office as Captains Regent of San Marino.
- April 1 – Massoud Barzani becomes President of the governing council of Iraq.
- April 1 – Roland Brogli becomes Landammann of Aargau.
- April 4 – Camille de Rocca-Serra is elected as president of the Corsican Assembly.
- April 5 – Mahinda Rajapakse is appointed as Prime Minister of Sri Lanka.
- April 6 – Artūras Paulauskas becomes acting President of Lithuania.
- April 6 – Gabriele Gendotti becomes president of the Council of State of Ticino.
- April 7 – José Luis Rodríguez Zapatero is asked to form the new government of Spain.
- April 10 – Chen Tang-shan is named foreign minister of the Republic of China.
- April 12 – Georgy Shpak takes office as governor of Ryazan.
- April 14 – Nikolay Kiselyov is sworn in as governor of Arkhangelsk. Mikhail Yevdokimov is sworn in as governor of Altai Krai.
- April 14 – James Michel is sworn in as President of Seychelles.
- April 14 – S'bu Ndebele is sworn in as Premier of KwaZulu-Natal.
- April 16 – Prague Process between Azerbaijani and Armenian foreign ministries is started.
- April 17 – José María Barreda Fontes assumes the Presidency of the Junta of Castilla-La Mancha.
- April 18 – Miguel Ángel Moratinos becomes foreign minister of Spain.
- April 21 – Macky Sall is appointed as Prime Minister of Senegal.
- April 22 – Catherine Mabuza becomes acting premier of Limpopo.
- April 23 – Leonard Ramatlakane is sworn in as acting premier of Western Cape.
- April 23 – Sergey Gaplikov becomes acting Prime Minister of Chuvashia.
- April 24- Referendums on the Annan Plan for Cyprus, which proposes to re-unite the island of Cyprus, take place in both the Republic of Cyprus controlled and Turkish controlled parts. Although the Turkish Cypriots vote in favour, the Greek Cypriots reject the proposal.
- April 26 – Sello Moloto is sworn in as premier of Limpopo. Ebrahim Rasool is elected premier of Western Cape.
- April 28 – Gabi Burgstaller is sworn in as Landeshauptfrau of Salzburg.
- April 29 – Ousmane Issoufi Maïga is appointed Prime Minister of Mali.

=== May ===
- May 1 – Laurie Morgan is elected chief minister of Guernsey.
- May 1 – Ezzedine Salim becomes president of the governing council of Iraq.
- May 1 – Jean-René Fournier takes office as president of the Council of State of Valais. Ruedi Jeker takes office as president of the government of Zürich.
- May 2 – Moctar Ouane becomes foreign minister of Mali.
- May 2 – Marek Belka is sworn in as prime minister of Poland.
- May 7 – Fredis Refunjol is sworn in as governor of Aruba.
- May 9 – Carlos Gomes Júnior is named Prime Minister of Guinea-Bissau.
- May 10 – Deborah Barnes Jones is sworn in as governor of Montserrat.
- May 17 – Ghazi al-Yawer becomes president of the governing council of Iraq.
- May 19 – Manmohan Singh is invited to form the new government of India.
- May 20 – Bingu wa Mutharika wins the presidential election in Malawi.
- May 23 – K. Natwar Singh becomes foreign minister of India.
- May 28 – Dharam Singh is installed as chief minister of Karnataka.
- May 28 – Alan Huckle is sworn in as governor of Anguilla.

=== June ===
- June 1 – Antonio Saca becomes President of El Salvador; Francisco Laínez becomes foreign minister.
- June 1 – Barbara Egger-Jenzer becomes President of the Government of Bern. Sylvie Perrinjaquet becomes president of the Council of State of Neuchâtel, Josef Keller Landammann of Sankt Gallen, Claudius Graf-Schelling president of the government of Thurgau, and Josef Arnold Landammann of Uri.
- June 2 – The parliament of the Republic of Macedonia approves the new government of Prime Minister Hari Kostov.
- June 10 – The Congress of New Caledonia elects Marie-Noëlle Thémereau as new president of the government.
- June 14 – Oscar Temaru is elected president of French Polynesia.
- June 15 – Ivan Gašparovič takes office as president of Slovakia.
- June 26 – Chaudhry Shujaat Hussain is named as new prime minister of Pakistan.
- June 27 – New President of Serbia, Boris Tadić elected.
- June 28 – Canadian federal elections occur; the Liberal party loses its absolute majority.

=== July ===
- July 1 – Horst Köhler takes office as President of Germany.
- July 1 – Adrian Ballmer becomes president of the government of Basel-Land; Gerhard Odermatt Landammann of Nidwalden; Elisabeth Gander-Hofer Landammann of Obwalden; and Kurt Zibung Landammann of Schwyz.
- July 1 – M. Jodi Rell is sworn in as Governor of Connecticut.
- July 3 – Michael Frendo is sworn in as foreign minister of Malta.
- July 5 – T. V. Rajeshwar is appointed Governor of Uttar Pradesh.
- July 6 – John Edwards named as John Kerry's running mate for U.S. President.
- July 6 – Ivo Vajgl becomes foreign minister of Slovenia.
- July 8 – Heinz Fischer is sworn in as President of Austria.
- July 9 – Ahmed Nazif is named Prime Minister of Egypt.
- July 11 – Boris Tadić is sworn in as President of Serbia.
- July 12 – Pedro Santana Lopes appointed Prime Minister of Portugal.
- July 17 – António Monteiro is sworn in as Foreign Minister of Portugal.
- July 19 – Marie Arena becomes minister-president of the French Community of Belgium; Charles Picqué becomes minister-president of Brussels-Capital
- July 20 – Karel De Gucht is sworn in as foreign minister of Belgium
- July 20 – Canadian prime minister Paul Martin announces his new cabinet. See Cabinet of Canada.
- July 21 – Artis Pabriks is elected foreign minister of Latvia.
- July 22 – Yves Leterme becomes minister-president of Flanders.
- July 26 – Stanislav Gross is appointed as the prime minister of the Czech Republic.
- July 30 – Jean Asselborn becomes foreign minister of Luxembourg,

=== August ===
- August 10 – George Yeo becomes foreign minister of Singapore.
- August 12 – Lee Hsien Loong is sworn in as prime minister of Singapore.
- August 16 – Søren Jessen-Petersen takes office as Kosovo administrator.
- August 17 – Aleksandr Zhilkin becomes acting governor of Astrakhan Oblast.
- August 18 – Lyonpo Yeshey Zimba takes office as prime minister of Bhutan.
- August 18 – Alberto Romulo is appointed as foreign secretary of the Philippines.
- August 23 – Babulal Gaur is sworn in as chief minister of Madhya Pradesh.
- August 25 – Hungarian Socialist Party picks Ferenc Gyurcsány to be Prime Minister of Hungary.
- August 27 – Shaukat Aziz is elected Prime Minister of Pakistan by the National Assembly of Pakistan.
- August 31 – Oommen Chandy is sworn in as chief minister of Kerala.

=== September ===
- September 1 – Terry Davis takes office as secretary-general of the Council of Europe.
- September 1 – Martín Torrijos takes office as president of Panama; Samuel Lewis Navarro becomes Vice President.
- September 2 – Col. Michel Sallé becomes Interior Minister of the Central African Republic.
- September 9 – Anatoly Kvashnin is appointed as Vladimir Putin's plenipotentiary in the Sibirsky federal district.
- September 10 – Alan Boradzov is confirmed Prime Minister of North Ossetia.
- September 13 – Dmitry Kozak is appointed as Vladimir Putin's plenipotentiary in Southern Federal District of Russia.
- September 15 – Halldór Ásgrímsson becomes Prime Minister of Iceland.
- September 27 – Nobutaka Machimura becomes foreign minister of Japan.
- September 28 – Tsendiin Mönkh-Orgil is approved as foreign minister of Mongolia.
- September 29 – Ignacio Walker Prieto is named foreign minister of Chile.
- September 29 – Dermot Ahern becomes foreign minister of the Republic of Ireland.

=== October ===
- October 1 – Giuseppe Arzilli and Roberto Raschi take office as captains-regent of San Marino.
- October 3 – Nodar Khashba is appointed as Prime Minister of the Republic of Georgia.
- October 5 – Alu Alkhanov is sworn in as president of Chechnya.
- October 6 – Norodom Sihamoni is chosen as King of Cambodia.
- October 9 – Australian election held, John Howard's conservative government re-elected for a fourth term.
- October 10 – Abdullahi Yusuf Ahmed is elected by the Transitional National Assembly of Somalia as president.
- October 13 – Atay Aliyev is named Prime Minister of Dagestan.
- October 14 – Sidi Moro Sanneh is appointed as foreign minister of The Gambia.
- October 19 – Lt. Gen. Soe Win becomes Prime Minister of Myanmar.
- October 20 – Susilo Bambang Yudhoyono is sworn in as President of Indonesia.
- October 20 – Ursula Plassnik is sworn in as foreign minister of Austria.
- October 21 – Omar Karami is named Prime Minister of Lebanon.
- October 26 – Petrus Compton becomes foreign minister of Saint Lucia.

=== November ===
- November 2 – George W. Bush is re-elected for a second and final four-year term as U.S. President.
- November 2 – Ferenc Somogyi is sworn in as foreign minister of Hungary.
- November 3 – Sheikh Khalifa bin Zayed Al Nahyan becomes President of the United Arab Emirates.
- November 3 – Janez Janša becomes Prime Minister-designate of Slovenia.
- November 8 – Brenda Christian becomes mayor of Pitcairn Island.
- November 10 – Abdelbaki Hermassi is named foreign minister of Tunisia.
- November 11 – Rauhi Fattouh becomes acting President of Palestine.
- November 18 – New Zealand parliament passes legislation vesting ownership of all land up to the high tide mark in New Zealand with the Crown.
- November 18 – Monyane Moleleki is named foreign minister of Lesotho.
- November 20 – Alí Rodríguez Araque is named foreign minister of Venezuela.
- November 22 – Mariya Bolshakova becomes acting governor of Ulyanovsk Oblast.
- November 22 – Ralph Klein is re-elected as Premier of Alberta with 61 of 83 seats in the Legislative Assembly of Alberta.

=== December ===
- December 1 – Martine Brunschwig Graf becomes president of the Council of State of Genève.
- December 2 – Syed Sibtey Razi is appointed governor of Jharkhand.
- December 2 – The new government of Latvian Prime Minister Aigars Kalvītis is approved.
- December 3 – Ramush Haradinaj is elected Prime Minister of Serbia and Montenegro.
- December 7 – Milos Vystrcil is elected governor of Vysocina.
- December 8 – Ephraïm Inoni is appointed prime minister of Cameroon and Laurent Esso is appointed foreign minister.
- December 9 – Cellou Dalein Diallo is appointed Prime Minister of Guinea.
- December 11 – Ham Lini is elected Prime Minister of Vanuatu.
- December 12 – Traian Băsescu is elected and as president of Romania.
- December 14 – Jim Marurai is elected prime minister of the Cook Islands.
- December 17 – Mikhail Kuznetsov takes office as governor of Pskov Oblast.
- December 22 – Călin Popescu-Tăriceanu is nominated as Prime Minister of Romania.
- December 23 – Song Xiulian becomes acting governor of Qinghai.
- December 26 – Mihai-Răzvan Ungureanu is named foreign minister of Romania.
- December 28 – Nikolay Denin takes office as governor of Bryansk Oblast.

== Deaths ==
(Very partial list of politicians who died in 2004)

- January 6 – Dominica prime minister Pierre Charles dies of heart problems.
- January 15 – Maaruf al-Dawalibi, former Prime Minister of Syria.
- January 16 – Kalevi Sorsa, former Prime Minister of Finland.
- February 11 – Jozef Lenárt, former Prime Minister of Czechoslovakia.
- February 24 – Indian politician Sikander Bakht, governor of Kerala state, dies of an illness.
- February 26 – Macedonian president Boris Trajkovski is killed in a plane crash.
- February 29 – Sir Harold Bernard St. John, former Prime Minister of Barbados.
- March 1 – Tadjidine Ben Said Massounde, former Prime Minister of Comoros.
- March 5 – Carlos Julio Arosemena Monroy, former President of Ecuador.
- March 20 – Juliana of the Netherlands, former Queen of the Netherlands.
- April 9 – Sein Lwin, former President of Myanmar.
- April 18 – Ratu Sir Kamisese Mara, former President of Fiji.
- May 9 – Russian-backed Chechnyan president Akhmad Kadyrov is assassinated.
- May 17 – Iraq Interim Governing Council president Ezzedine Salim is assassinated.
- June 2 – Tesfaye Gebre Kidan, former acting President of Ethiopia.
- June 5 – Former US President Ronald Reagan dies of Alzheimer's disease at the age of 93.
- June 10 – Xenophon Zolotas, former Prime Minister of Greece.
- June 16 – Thanom Kittikachor, former Prime minister of Thailand.
- June 24 – Carlos Alberto Lacoste, former acting President of Argentina.
- June 25 – L.F. Ramdat Misier, former acting President of Suriname.
- Jule 5 – Hugh Lawson Shearer, former prime minister of Jamaica.
- July 6 – Austrian president Thomas Klestil dies of a heart attack just two days before he was to retire.
- July 10 – Maria de Lurdes Pintassilgo, former Prime Minister of Portugal.
- July 19 – Zenko Suzuki, former Prime Minister of Japan.
- September 12 – Ahmed Dini Ahmed, former Prime Minister of Djibouti.
- September 23 – Winston Cinac, former Prime Minister of Saint Lucia.
- November 11 – Former Palestinian President Yasser Arafat dies from a mysterious illness, aged 75.
- November 18 – Alfred Maseng, former President of Vanuatu.
- November 26 – Hans Schaffner, former President of Switzerland.
- December 23 – P.V. Narasimha Rao, former Prime Minister of India.

== See also ==
- 2004 Canadian federal election
- 2004 Australian federal election
- 2004 U.S. presidential election
- 2004 Serbian presidential election
- 2004 European Parliament election
- 2004 Annan Plan Referendum
