= Friedrich Huwyler =

Swiss politician

Friedrich Huwyler (29 September 1942 in Bünzen – 4 October 2009 in Grossen Mythen) was a Swiss politician. He was affiliated to the Free Democratic Party.

Huwyler was Council and Mayor from 1978 to 1980 for the Schwyz Cantonal Government. He was an attorney who led his own law firm. He was appointed Director of Justice for two legislative sessions for Schwyz from 1996 to 2004. He served as Member of the Cantonal Council of the Canton of Schwyz from 2002 to 2004. Huwyler lived in Rickenbach (SZ).

Huwyler died on 4 October 2009 in a hiking accident on the Grosser Mythen.
