= Ruth Lüthi =

Swiss academic and politician (born 1947)

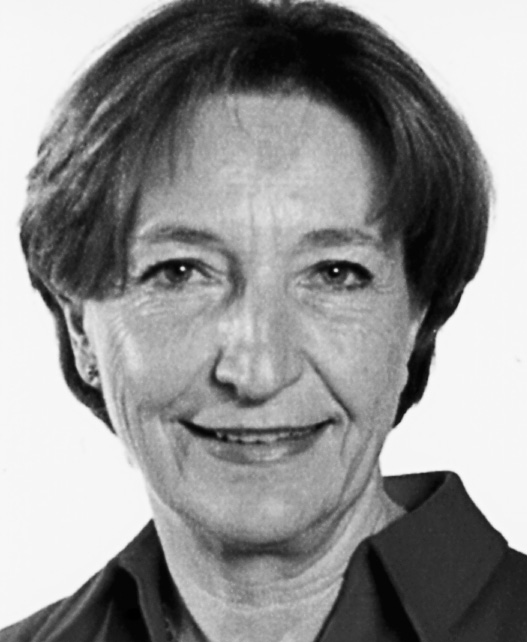

Personal details
- Born: Ruth Affolter; 14 September 1947 (age 79) Grenchen, Switzerland
- Party: Social Democratic Party
- Spouse: Ambros Lüthi
- Education: University of Bern

Ruth Lüthi (née: Affolter; born 14 September 1947) is a Swiss academic and a former politician. She was a member of the Social Democratic Party and headed the public health and social affairs department of the Canton of Fribourg between 1991 and 2006. She was a member of the Council of the Fribourg Canton.

== Early life and education ==
She was born in Grenchen, Switzerland, on 14 September 1947. She received her Ph.D. in psychology from the University of Bern in 1990.

== Career ==
Following her graduation from university Lüthi worked as a teacher from 1967 to 1978. She was an assistant at the Psychological Institute of the University of Fribourg and then a research associate at the National Fund between 1979 and 1982. In the 1990–1991 academic year Lüthi joined the University of Bern where she worked as a lecturer.

Lüthi was elected to the council of the Canton of Fribourg in 1982. She headed the Social Democratic Party in Fribourg between 1988 and 1991. She was named as the head of the public health and social affairs department in the Canton of Fribourg in 1991 and held post for 15 years until 2006. She was the president of Council of State of Fribourg for three terms in 1996, 2000 and 2005. She became a board member of the Swiss National Bank in 1999. She retired from politics in 2006. In April 2007 she was appointed president of the Federal AHV/IV Commission. The same year she was also made president of the Freiburg International Film Festival. She was the president of the Senate of the University of Freiburg until 2016.

== Personal life ==
She was married to Ambros Lüthi who died in 2008. She has been living in Freiburg since 1973.
