= 1965 in politics =

This is a list of events in 1965 in politics.

== Events ==
=== January ===
- January 14 - The Prime Minister of Northern Ireland and the Taoiseach of the Republic of Ireland meet for the first time in 43 years.
- January 20 - Lyndon B. Johnson is sworn in for a full term as President of the United States.
- January 20 - Indonesian President Sukarno announces the withdrawal of the Indonesian government from the United Nations.

=== February ===
- February 18 - The Gambia becomes independent from the United Kingdom.
- February 21 - African-American Muslim minister and human rights activist Malcolm X is assassinated in New York City.
- February 23 - Herberts Cukurs, a Latvian aviator, mass murderer and former Nazi collaborator is unofficially executed by Mossad.

=== March ===
- March 7 - Bloody Sunday: Some 200 Alabama State Troopers attack 525 civil rights demonstrators in Selma, Alabama, as they attempt to march to the state capitol of Montgomery.
- March 8 - Some 3,500 United States Marines arrive in Da Nang, South Vietnam, becoming the first American ground combat troops in Vietnam.
- March 9 - The second attempt, known as "Turnaround Tuesday", to march from Selma to Montgomery, Alabama, under the leadership of Martin Luther King Jr., stops at the bridge that was the site of Bloody Sunday, to hold a prayer service and return to Selma.
- March 16 - Police clash with 600 Student Nonviolent Coordinating Committee marchers in Montgomery, Alabama.
- March 17 - In response to the events of March 7 and 9 in Selma, Alabama, President Lyndon B. Johnson sends a bill to Congress that forms the basis for the Voting Rights Act of 1965. It is passed by the Senate May 26, the House July 10, and signed into law by President Johnson August 6.
- March 18 - A United States federal judge rules that SCLC has the lawful right to march to Montgomery, Alabama, to petition for "redress of grievances".
- March 20 - The Indo-Pakistani War of 1965 begins.
- March 22 – Nicolae Ceaușescu becomes the first secretary of the Romanian Communist Party, after the death of previous leader Gheorghe Gheorghiu Dej earlier that year.
- March 23 - Large student demonstration in Morocco, joined by discontented masses, is met with violent police and military repression.
- March 25 - Martin Luther King Jr. and 25,000 civil rights activists successfully complete the 4-day march from Selma, Alabama, to the capitol in Montgomery.
- March 30 - The second ODECA charter, signed on December 12, 1962, becomes effective.

=== April ===
- April 9 - The West German parliament extends the statute of limitations on Nazi war crimes.
- April 17 - The first Students for a Democratic Society march against the Vietnam War draws 25,000 protestors to Washington, D.C.
- April 24 - The 1965 Yerevan demonstrations start in Yerevan, demanding recognition of the Armenian genocide.
- April 24 - In the Dominican Republic, officers and civilians loyal to deposed President Juan Bosch against the right-wing junta running the country, setting up a provisional government. Forces loyal to the deposed military-imposed government stage a countercoup the next day, and civil war breaks out
- April 28 - U.S. troops occupy the Dominican Republic.
- April 29 - Australia announces that it is sending an infantry battalion to support the South Vietnam government.

=== May ===
- May 1 - Bob Askin replaces Jack Renshaw as Premier of New South Wales.
- May 12 - West Germany and Israel establish diplomatic relations.
- May 22 - Several hundred Vietnam War protesters in Berkeley, California, march to the Draft Board again to burn 19 more cards. Lyndon Johnson is hung in effigy.

=== June ===
- June 10 - Vietnam War – Battle of Dong Xoai: About 1,500 Viet Cong mount a mortar attack on Đồng Xoài, overrunning its military headquarters and the adjoining militia compound.
- June 19 - Houari Boumediene's Revolutionary Council ousts Ahmed Ben Bella, in a bloodless coup in Algeria.
- June 20 - Police in Algiers break up demonstrations by people who have taken to the streets chanting slogans in support of deposed President Ahmed Ben Bella.
- June 22 - The Treaty on Basic Relations between Japan and the Republic of Korea is signed in Tokyo.

=== July ===
- July 1 - The Commonwealth is created.
- July 15 - Greek Prime minister Georgios Papandreou and his government are dismissed by King Constantine II.
- July 26 - The Maldives receive full independence from Great Britain.
- July 27 - Edward Heath becomes Leader of the British Conservative Party.
- July 28 - U.S. President Lyndon B. Johnson announces his order to increase the number of United States troops in South Vietnam from 75,000 to 125,000, and to more than double the number of men drafted per month - from 17,000 to 35,000.
- July 30 - U.S. President Lyndon B. Johnson signs the Social Security Act of 1965 into law, establishing Medicare and Medicaid.

=== August ===
- August 4 - The Cook Islands becomes a free New Zealand-associated state, with its own constitution.
- August 6 - U.S. President Lyndon B. Johnson signs the Voting Rights Act of 1965 into law, outlawing literacy tests and other discriminatory voting practices.
- August 9 - Owing to conflicting relations between the Singapore's People's Action Party and Malaysia's United Malays National Organisation, the Independence of Singapore Agreement 1965 was enacted, separating Singapore from Malaysia and formed an independent republic state, entitled the Republic of Singapore. The day of August 9 is thus declared as National Day, with annual celebrations to follow.
- August 11 - The Watts Riots begin in Los Angeles, ending on the 16th after resulting in 34 deaths and over 3,000 arrests.
- August 18 - Vietnam War – Operation Starlite: 5,500 United States Marines destroy a Viet Cong stronghold on the Van Tuong peninsula in Quảng Ngãi Province, in the first major American ground battle of the war.
- August 19 - At the conclusion of the Frankfurt Auschwitz trials, 66 ex-SS personnel receive life sentences, 15 others smaller ones.
- August 20 - Jonathan Myrick Daniels, an Episcopal seminarian from Keene, New Hampshire, is murdered in Hayneville, Alabama, while working in the civil rights movement.
- August 31 - President Johnson signs a law penalizing the burning of draft cards with up to 5 years in prison and a $1,000 fine.

=== September ===
- September 2 - Pakistani troops enter the Indian sector of Kashmir, while Indian troops try to invade Lahore.
- September 9 - U.N. Secretary General U Thant negotiates with Pakistan President Ayub Khan.
- September 9 - U Thant recommends China for United Nations membership.
- September 9 - The United States Department of Housing and Urban Development is established.
- September 14 - The fourth and final period of the Second Vatican Council opens.
- September 16 - China protests against Indian provocations in its border region.
- September 16 - In Iraq, Prime Minister Arif Abd ar-Razzaq's attempted coup fails.
- September 17 - King Constantine II of Greece forms a new government with Prime Minister Stephanos Stephanopoulos, in an attempt to end a 2-year-old political crisis.
- September 18 - Soviet Premier Alexei Kosygin invites the leaders of India and Pakistan to meet in the Soviet Union to negotiate.
- September 19 - Pakistani Forces achieve a decisive victory at the Battle of Chawinda, ultimately halting the Indian advance and successfully stabilizing the Sialkot Front.
- September 21 - Gambia, Maldives and Singapore are admitted as members of the United Nations.
- September 24 - The British governor of Aden cancels the constitution and takes direct control of the protectorate, due to the bad security situation.
- September 28 - Fidel Castro announces that anyone who wants to can emigrate to the United States.
- September 30 - The Indonesian army, led by General Suharto, crushes an alleged communist coup attempt (see Transition to the New Order and 30 September Movement).

=== October ===
- October 3 - Fidel Castro announces that Che Guevara has resigned and left the country.
- October 3 - U.S. President Lyndon B. Johnson signs the Immigration and Nationality Act of 1965 which ends quotas based on national origin.
- October 4 - Prime minister Ian Smith of Rhodesia and Arthur Bottomley of the Commonwealth of Nations begin negotiations in London.
- October 5 - Pakistan severs diplomatic relations with Malaysia because of disagreement in the UN.
- October 8 - Indonesian mass killings of 1965–1966: The Indonesian army instigates the arrest and execution of communists which last until next March.
- October 9 - A brigade of South Korean soldiers arrive in South Vietnam.
- October 12 - The U.N. recommends that the United Kingdom try everything to stop a rebellion in Rhodesia.
- October 12 - Per Borten replaces Einar Gerhardsen as prime minister of Norway.
- October 13 - Congo President Joseph Kasavubu fires Prime Minister Moise Tshombe and forms a provisional government, with Évariste Kimba in a leading position.
- October 15 - Vietnam War: The Catholic Worker Movement stages an anti-war protest in Manhattan. One draft card burner is arrested, the first under the new law.
- October 16 - Anti-war protests draw 100,000 in 80 U.S. cities and around the world
- October 18 - The Indonesian government outlaws the Communist Party of Indonesia.
- October 20 - Ludwig Erhard is re-elected Chancellor of West Germany (he had first been elected in 1963).
- October 21 - The Organization of African Unity meets in Accra, Ghana.
- October 22 - African countries demand that the United Kingdom use force to prevent Rhodesia from declaring unilateral independence.
- October 22 - Colonel Christophe Soglo stages a second coup in Dahomey.
- October 24 - British Prime Minister Harold Wilson and Commonwealth Secretary Arthur Bottomley travel to Rhodesia for negotiations.
- October 25 - The Soviet Union declares its support of African countries in case Rhodesia unilaterally declares independence.
- October 26 - Anti-government demonstrations occur in the Dominican Republic.
- October 27 - Süleyman Demirel of AP forms the new government of Turkey (30th government).
- October 27 - Brazilian president Humberto de Alencar Castelo Branco removes power from parliament, legal courts and all opposition parties.
- October 28 - French Foreign Minister Maurice Couve de Murville travels to Moscow.
- October 28 - Mehdi Ben Barka, a Moroccan politician, is kidnapped in Paris and never seen again
- October 28 - Pope Paul VI promulgates Nostra aetate, a "Declaration on the Relation of the (Roman Catholic) Church with Non-Christian Religions" by the Second Vatican Council which includes a statement that Jews are not collectively responsible for the death of Jesus.
- October 30 - In Washington, D.C., a pro-Vietnam War march draws 25,000.

=== November ===
- November 2 - Republican John Vliet Lindsay is elected mayor of New York City.
- November 2 - Quaker Norman Morrison, 32, sets himself on fire in front of The Pentagon; he dies of his injuries.
- November 3 - French President Charles de Gaulle announces (just short of his 75th birthday) that he will stand for re-election.
- November 5 - Martial law is announced in Rhodesia. The United Nations General Assembly accepts British intent to use force against Rhodesia if necessary by a vote of 82–9.
- November 8 - Vietnam War – Operation Hump: The United States Army 173rd Airborne is ambushed by over 1,200 Viet Cong
- November 8 - The British Indian Ocean Territory is created, consisting of Chagos Archipelago, Aldabra, Farquhar and Desroches islands.
- November 8 - The Murder (Abolition of Death Penalty) Act 1965 is given Royal Assent, suspending the death penalty for murder in the United Kingdom.
- November 9 -In New York City, 22-year-old Catholic Worker Movement member Roger Allen LaPorte sets himself on fire in front of the United Nations building in protest against the Vietnam War.
- November 11 - In Rhodesia (modern-day Zimbabwe), the white-minority government of Ian Smith unilaterally declares de facto independence
- November 12 - A UN Security Council resolution (voted 10–0) recommends that other countries not recognize independent Rhodesia.
- November 14 - Battle of Ia Drang: In the Ia Drang Valley of the Central Highlands in Vietnam, the first major engagement of the war between regular United States and North Vietnamese forces begins.
- November 20 - The United Nations Security Council recommends that all states stop trading with Rhodesia.
- November 22 - The United Nations Development Programme (UNDP) is established as a specialized agency of the United Nations.
- November 23 - Soviet general Mikhail Kazakov assumes command of the Warsaw Pact.
- November 24 - Congolese lieutenant general Mobutu ousts Joseph Kasavubu and declares himself president.
- November 26 - At the Hammaguir launch facility in the Sahara Desert, France launches a Diamant A rocket with its first satellite, Astérix-1 on board, becoming the third country to enter outer space.
- November 27 - Tens of thousands of Vietnam War protesters picket the White House, then march on the Washington Monument.
- November 27 - The Pentagon tells U.S. President Lyndon B. Johnson that if planned major sweep operations to neutralize Viet Cong forces during the next year are to succeed, the number of American troops in Vietnam will have to be increased from 120,000 to 400,000.
- November 28 - Vietnam War: In response to U.S. President Lyndon B. Johnson's call for "more flags" in Vietnam, Philippines President-elect Ferdinand Marcos announces he will send troops to help fight in South Vietnam.

=== December ===
- December 1 - The Border Security Force is established in India as a special force to guard the borders.
- December 3 - The first British aid flight arrives in Lusaka; Zambia had asked for British help against Rhodesia.
- December 3 - Members of the Organization of African Unity decide to sever diplomatic relations with the United Kingdom, unless the British Government ends the rebellion of Rhodesia by mid-December.
- December 5 - The "Glasnost Meeting" in Moscow becomes the first spontaneous political demonstration, and the first demonstration for civil rights in the Soviet Union
- December 8 - Rhodesian prime minister Ian Smith warns that Rhodesia will resist a trade embargo by neighboring countries with force.
- December 8 - The Race Relations Act becomes the first legislation to address racial discrimination in the UK.
- December 8 - The Second Vatican Council closes.
- December 15 - The Caribbean Free Trade Association (CARIFTA) is formed.
- December 15 - Tanzania and Guinea sever diplomatic relations with the United Kingdom.
- December 17 - The British government begins an oil embargo against Rhodesia; the United States joins the effort.
- December 20 - The World Food Programme is made a permanent agency of the United Nations.
- December 21 - The Soviet Union announces that it has shipped rockets to North Vietnam.
- December 21 - In West Germany, Konrad Adenauer resigns as chairman of the Christian Democratic Party.
- December 21 - The United Nations adopts the International Convention on the Elimination of All Forms of Racial Discrimination.
- December 22 - A military coup is launched in Dahomey.
- December 25 - The Yemeni Nasserist Unionist People's Organisation is founded in Taiz.
- December 28 - Italian Foreign Minister Amintore Fanfani resigns.
- December 30 - President Kenneth Kaunda of Zambia announces that Zambia and the United Kingdom have agreed on a deadline before which the Rhodesian white government should be ousted.
- December 30 - Ferdinand Marcos becomes President of the Philippines.
- December 31 - Emperor Jean-Bédel Bokassa takes power in the Central African Republic.

== Deaths ==
=== January 24 ===
- Winston Churchill, former Prime Minister of the United Kingdom (1940–1945) and (1951–1955).

=== February 21 ===
- Malcolm X African-American Muslim minister and human rights activist is assassinated in New York City.

=== March 11 ===
- James Reeb, an American Unitarian Universalist minister, pastor, and activist during the civil rights movement. While participating in the Selma to Montgomery marches he was murdered by white segregationists.

=== November 18 ===
- Khalid al-Azm, Syrian politician and five-time interim Prime Minister.
