= 2009 in politics =

These are some of the notable events relating to politics in 2009:

== Events ==
- United Kingdom Parliamentary expenses scandal

=== January ===
- January 17 - UN Secretary General Ban Ki-moon calls for an immediate ceasefire during the Gaza conflict.
- January 20 - Inauguration of Barack Obama as President of the United States.

=== June ===
- June 2 - New Politics Party was formed in Thailand.
- June 4 - Change 2011 party was formed in Finland.

=== July ===
- July 3–5 - Global Lincoln, a conference on Abraham Lincoln at St Catherine's College, Oxford.

=== August ===
- August 30 - The 2009 Japanese general election was held, and Democratic Party Yukio Hatoyama become the new Prime Minister of Japan following the victory over the ruling Liberal Democratic Party, marking LDP's loss for the first time since the LDP assumed government in 1958, and LDP being the opposition party since 1993-94.

=== October ===
- October 1 - The Supreme Court of the United Kingdom begins operating.
- October 2 - The Republic of Ireland voted in favour of the Lisbon Treaty.

=== November ===
- November 3 - Incumbent Democrat Luke Ravenstahl defeats both Franklin Dok Harris and Kevin Acklin in the Pittsburgh mayoral election, 2009.

== Deaths ==
- January 1 - Nizar Rayan, Palestinian (born 1959)
- January 1 - Helen Suzman, South African (born 1924)
- January 15 - Said Seyam, Palestinian (born 1957)
- January 25 - Mamadou Dia, Senegalese (born 1910)
- January 27 - R. Venkataraman, Indian (born 1910)
- February 27 - Manea Manescu, Romanian (born 1916)
- March 2 - João Bernardo Vieira, Guinea-Bissauan (born 1939)
- March 15 - Ron Silver, American (born 1946)
- March 20 - Abdellatif Filali, Moroccan (born 1928)
- March 28 - Janet Jagan, Guyanese (born 1920)
- March 31 - Raúl Alfonsín, Argentinian (born 1927)
- April 15 - Clement Freud, British (born 1924)
- April 21 - Jack Jones, British (born 1913)
- May 2 - Jack Kemp, American (born 1935)
- May 18 - Velupillai Prabhakaran, Sri Lankan (born 1954)
- May 23 - Roh Moo-hyun, South Korean (born 1946)
- May 30 - Luís Cabral, Guinea-Bissauan (born 1931)
- May 30 - Ephraim Katzir, Israeli (born 1916)
- May 30 - Gaafar Nimeiri, Sudanese (born 1930)
- June 5 - Bernard Barker, American (born 1917)
- June 8 - Omar Bongo, Gabonese (born 1935)
- June 12 - Félix Malloum, Chadian (born 1932)
- June 17 - Ralf Dahrendorf, Anglo-German (born 1929)
- June 24 - Roméo LeBlanc, Canadian (born 1927)
- July 1 - Alexis Argüello, Nicaraguan (born 1952)
- July 2 - Herbert G. Klein, American (born 1918)
- July 6 - Robert McNamara, American (born 1916)
- July 7 - Reader Harris, British (born 1913)
- July 17 - Meir Amit, Israeli (born 1921)
- July 26 - James E. King, American (born 1939)
- August 1 - Corazon Aquino, Filipina (born 1933)
- August 4 - Svend Auken, Danish (born 1943)
- August 6 - Savka Dabcevic-Kukar, Croatian (born 1923)
- August 11 - Nuala Fennell, Irish (born 1935)
- August 18 - Kim Dae-jung, South Korean (born 1925)
- August 22 - Adrien Zeller, French (born 1940)
- August 25 - Ted Kennedy, American (born 1932)
- September 2 - Y. S. Rajasekhara Reddy, Indian (born 1949)
- September 28 - Guillermo Endara, Panamanian (born 1936)
- October 4 - Shoichi Nakagawa, Japanese (born 1953)
- October 16 - Robert William Davis, American (born 1932)
- October 17 - Jay W. Johnson, American (born 1943)
- October 20 - Clifford Hansen, American (born 1912)
- November 4 - William H. Avery, American (born 1911)
- November 13 - Bruce King, American (born 1924)
- November 15 - Pierre Harmel, Belgian (born 1911)
- November 20 - Ghulam Mustafa Jatoi, Pakistani (born 1931)
- November 20 - Celso Pitta, Brazilian (born 1946)
- November 22 - Ali Kordan, Iranian (born 1958)
- December 3 - Paula Hawkins, American (born 1927)
- December 5 - Otto Graf Lambsdorff, German (born 1926)
- December 9 - Kjell Eugenio Laugerud García, Guatemalan (born 1930)
- December 9 - Rodrigo Carazo Odio, Costa Rican (born 1926)
- December 16 - Yegor Gaidar, Russian (born 1956)
- December 16 - Manto Tshabalala-Msimang (born 1940)
- December 17 - Amin al-Hafiz, Syrian (born 1921)
