= Harmodio Arias Cerjack =

Panamanian politician

Harmodio Arias Cerjack (March 1, 1956 – February 6, 2014) was a Panamanian politician. He was the Foreign Minister from 2003 to 2004.

Cerjack died at the age of 57.
