= 1998 in politics =

This is a list of events relating to politics in 1998.

== Events ==
=== January ===
- January 11 - 103 people are murdered in the Sidi-Hamed massacre in Algeria
- January 12 - 19 European nations in Paris sign a treating prohibiting human cloning
- January 17 - U.S. President Bill Clinton's alleged affair with Monica Lewinsky is exposed by the Drudge Report
- January 30 - Guinea-Bissau's defense minister announces the suspension of the Chief of Staff of the armed forces, Brigadier-General Ansumane Mané fordereliction of duty

=== February ===
- February 28 - British physician Andrew Wakefield publishes a later-discredited study, suggesting a link between the MMR vaccine and autism, leading to the growth of the anti-vaccine movement and the resurgence of measles in several countries
- February 28 - The attacks on Likoshan and Çirez mark the beginning of the Kosovo War

=== March ===
- March 10 - Suharto is re-elected president of Indonesia by the People's Consultative Assembly
- March 11 - 1998 Danish general election: Prime Minister Poul Nyrup Rasmussen is re-elected in a very close vote requiring multiple recounts
- March 26 - 47 people, including 27 children, are murdered in the Oued Bouaïcha massacre in Algeria

=== April ===
- April 10 - The Good Friday Agreement in signed between most of Northern Ireland's parties and the Irish and British governments, ending the majority of the violence of the Troubles and outlining devolution for Northern Ireland
- April 20 - The German far-left militant group Red Army faction are (allegedly) dissolved
- April 23 - 19 Kosovo Liberation Army fighters attempting to smuggle weapons into Kosovo are killed in the Albanian–Yugoslav border ambush

=== May ===
- May 4 - Anti-government riots targeting ethnic Chinese Indonesians break out in Indonesia
- May 6 - Beginning of the Eritrean-Ethiopean War with the entry of a large Eritrean mechanized force into the Badme region along the Eritrea-Ethiopia border
- May 13 - The Ethiopean parliament declares war on Eritrea, following the failure of international efforts to dissolve the conflict
- May 21 - Resignation of Indonesian president Suharto and collapse of his New Order regime following protests and riots beginning on May 4. Suharto's Vice President, B. J. Habibie, becomes Indonesia's third president
- May 28 - Responding to a series of Indian nuclear tests, Pakistan explodes conducts its first nuclear test in Balochistan leading to US-led economic sanctions

=== June ===
- June 1 - The European Central Bank is established, replacing the European Monetary Institute
- June 5 - The Eritrean Air Force bomb Ethiopia's Tigray region, targeting the capital of Mekelle, following Ethiopian airstrikes on Asmara International Airport using bombs and napalm
- June 7 - Beginning of the Guinea-Bissau Civil War as former Brigadier-General Ansumane Mané leads a coup attempt against the government of President João Bernardo Vieira
- June 10 - The Organisation of African Unity resolves to cease compliance with certain punitive sanctions applied by the UN Security Council against Libya
- June 19 - Failure of an OAU-mandated mediation mission in Ouagadougou to end the Eritrean-Ethiopian War through the proposed US-Rwanda peace plan
- June 26 - The United Nations Security Council adopt Resolution 1177 condemning the Eritrea-Ethiopia conflict, and demanding a ceasefire
- June 30 - Joseph Estrada, Vice President of the Philippines, is sworn in as President

=== July ===
- July 17 - The International Criminal Court is established by the Rome Statute, to prosecute individuals for genocide, crimes against humanity, war crimes, and the crime of aggression
- July 26 - In Guinea-Bissau, following mediation from the Community of Portuguese Language Countries, the government and rebels agree to implement a truce
- July 31 - The Government of Wales Act receives royal assent, giving effect to the Welsh devolution referendum of 1997

=== August ===
- August 2 - The Second Congo War begins following Congolese president Laurent-Désiré Kabila turning against his former allies in Rwanda and Uganda, who back a Rally for Congolese Democracy and Movement for the Liberation of the Congo led uprising: 5.4 million people die before it ends in 2003, making it the bloodiest war since World War II to date
- August 7 - US embassy bombings in Tanzania and Kenya are perpetrated by Al-Queda, killing more than 220 people
- August 15 - The Omagh bombing is carried out in Northern Ireland by the Real Irish Republican Army
- August 17 - Beginning of the 1998 Russian financial crisis as the Russian government devalues the ruble and declares a moratorium on the repayment of foreign debt

=== September ===
- September 5 - North Korea's constitution is amended and the late Kim Il Sung is enshrined as the eternal President
- September 8 - The Real IRA announce a ceasefire
- September 12 - The Cuban Five intelligence agents are arrested in Miami
- September 29 - US Congress passes the Iraq Liberation Act, supporting the efforts of Iraqi opposition groups to remove Saddam Hussein from office

=== October ===
- October 2 - A United Nations court finds Rwandan politician Jean-Paul Akayesu guilty of nine counts of genocide, marking the first time that the 1948 Genocide Convention is enforced
- October 9 - The Constitutional Court of South Africa strikes down anti-sodomy laws, the first in a series of rulings advancing LGBT rights in South Africa
- October 20 - President Joao Vieira declares a unilateral cease-fire in the Guinea-Bissau Civil War following further outbreaks of fighting
- October 20 - Libyan leader Colonel Gaddafi claims to have proof that Britain attempted to assassinate him

=== November ===
- November 1 - At a peace conference held by the Economic Community of West African States, the rebels and the government of the Guinea-Bissau sign a peace accord
- November 19 - The Scotland Act receives royal assent, giving effect to the Scottish devolution referendum of 1997

=== December ===
- December 3 - An official of Guinea Bissau’s military junta, Francisco Fadul, is appointed Prime Minister of Guinea-Bissau
- December 6 - Hugo Chávez is elected President of Venezuela
- December 21 - The United Nations Security Council adopt Resolution 1216, calling for the immediate establishment of a national unity government in Guinea-Bissau
