= 2016 in politics =

These are some of the notable events relating to politics in 2016.

== Events ==
=== January ===
- January 3 – Following the fallout caused by the execution of Nimr al-Nimr, Iran ends its diplomatic relations with Saudi Arabia.
- January 16 –
  - The International Atomic Energy Agency announces that Iran has adequately dismantled its nuclear weapons program, allowing the United Nations to lift sanctions immediately.
  - Taiwan elects Tsai Ing-wen as the country's seventh president, and the nation's first female president.

=== February ===
- February 7 – North Korea launches a long-range rocket into space, violating multiple UN treaties and prompting condemnation from around the world.
- February 12 – Pope Francis and Patriarch Kirill meet in Cuba, marking the first time the heads of the Roman Catholic and Russian Orthodox churches have met in almost 1,000 years.

=== March ===
- March 21 – The 44th President of the United States, Barack Obama, visits Cuba, marking the first time a sitting US president has visited the island nation since president Calvin Coolidge visited in 1928.

=== April ===
- April 3 – The Panama Papers were released by the German newspaper, Süddeutsche Zeitung, exposing a network of over 214,000 tax havens that involved people and entities from at least 200 nations.
- April 17 – Brazil President Dilma Rousseff impeached after being charged with criminal administrative misconduct and disregard for the federal budget.

=== May ===
- May 9 – The 2016 Philippine presidential election was held, and elected Rodrigo Duterte and Leni Robredo as the next President and Vice-President, respectively.
- May 27 – United States President Barack Obama visits Hiroshima, becoming the first sitting US President to visit the city.

=== June ===
- June 23 – The United Kingdom votes in a referendum to leave the European Union. The Prime Minister of United Kingdom David Cameron subsequently announced his resignation the following day.
- June 28 – ISIL is suspected to be responsible for attacking Atatürk Airport in Istanbul, killing 45 and injuring around 230.
- June 30 – Rodrigo Duterte becomes the 16th President of the Philippines.

=== July ===
- July 12 – The Philippines wins the arbitration case they filed at the Permanent Court of Arbitration regarding the legality of China's "nine-dash line" claim over the South China Sea under the United Nations Convention on the Law of the Sea.
- July 13 – Theresa May is declared Prime Minister of the United Kingdom, succeeding David Cameron.

=== August ===
- August 31 – The Brazilian Senate votes (61–20) to impeach the President of Brazil Dilma Rousseff. The Vice President of Brazil, Michel Temer, who had assumed the presidential powers and duties as Acting President of Brazil during Rousseff's suspension, takes office for the remainder of her term.

=== September ===
- September 3 – The US and China, together responsible for 40% of the world's carbon emissions, both formally joined the Paris global climate agreement.
- September 9 – The government of North Korea conducts its fifth and reportedly biggest nuclear test. World leaders condemn the act, with South Korea calling it "maniacal recklessness".

=== October ===
- October 13 – The Maldives announces its decision to withdraw from the Commonwealth of Nations.
- October 25 – Gambia announced it will withdraw from the International Criminal Court due to the court's alleged persecution and humiliation of Africans.
- A political scandal in South Korea between Choi Soon-sil and President of South Korea Park Geun-hye surfaced with allegations of potential abuse of power and coercion, precipitating Park's eventual impeachment on December 9.

=== November ===
- November 8 – The 2016 United States presidential election was held, with Republican candidate Donald Trump winning the election despite the loss of the popular vote, in which it was proven to be another upset.

=== December ===
- December 4 – Green Party candidate Alexander Van der Bellen wins Austria's second runoff election to become Austria's 11th president.
- December 7 – Italian Prime Minister Matteo Renzi officially resigned after his constitutional reform referendum was defeated.
- December 19 – Andrei Karlov, the Russian ambassador to Turkey, is assassinated in Ankara.
- December 23 – The United Nations Security Council adopts Resolution 2334 condemning "Israeli settlements in Palestinian territories occupied since 1967".
