= 2010 in politics =

These are some of the notable events relating to politics in 2010.

== Events ==
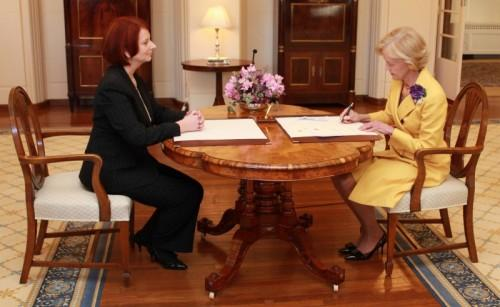
Quentin Bryce swearing in Julia Gillard

=== May ===
- May 10 – The 2010 Philippine presidential election was held, and Benigno Aquino III, member of the notable Aquino family, becomes the 15th President of the Philippines, while Jejomar Binay becomes vice-president-elect.
- May 11 – David Cameron announces he has formed a coalition government between the Conservative Party and Liberal Democrats forming the Cameron–Clegg coalition, following the resignation of the former Labour Party Prime Minister Gordon Brown.

=== June ===
- June 24 – Julia Gillard is sworn in as the first female Prime Minister of Australia after challenging her predecessor Kevin Rudd in a leadership ballot that resulted in his defeat.

=== August ===
- August 21 – The Australian Labor Party led by Prime Minister Julia Gillard defeats the Australian Liberal Party led by Opposition leader Tony Abbott in the 2010 Australian federal election. However, it also saw the first hung parliament in the Australian government in seven decades since 1940.

=== October ===
- October 10 – The Netherlands Antilles are dissolved, with the islands being split up and given a new constitutional status.
- October 11 – Israeli prime minister Benjamin Netanyahu negotiated deals with the Palestine on extending the settlement freeze if the Palestinian leadership recognizes Israel as a Jewish state; it was later rejected.
- October 28 – The second round of the 2010 Brazilian general election was held, and Dilma Rousseff is elected as the first female Brazilian president.
- Singaporean alliance bloc Singapore Democratic Alliance announced the change of leadership with Desmond Lim taking over long-time opposition figure Chiam See Tong as party's secretary-general, following an unsuccessful negotiation of the inclusion of Reform Party into the alliance in May; Chiam's Singapore People's Party would exit the alliance in March 2011.

=== November ===
- November 2 – The 2010 United States elections were held, with the Democratic Party winning a majority in the House of Representatives, snapping Republican's trifecta for the first time since 1994.
- November 13 – Burmese opposition politician Aung San Suu Kyi is released from her house arrest since her conviction back in 1989.

== Deaths ==
=== June ===
- June 23 – Peter Walker, Baron Walker of Worcester - Former Welsh Secretary, Energy Secretary and Conservative Party Life peer of the House of Lords.

=== October ===
- October 20 – Farooq Leghari - ex President of Pakistan
- October 27 – Néstor Kirchner - UNASUR Secretary-General and ex Argentine president

=== December ===
- December 25 – Carlos Andrés Pérez - President of Venezuela since 1974 to 1979
