= 2014 in politics =

These are some of the notable events relating to politics in 2014.

== Events ==
=== February ===
- February 13 – Belgium becomes the first country in the world to legalise euthanasia for terminally ill patients of any age, including infants.
- February 22 – The Ukrainian parliament votes to remove President Viktor Yanukovych from office, replacing him with Oleksandr Turchynov, after days of civil unrest left around 100 people dead in Kyiv, Ukraine.

=== March ===
- March 5 – Nicolás Maduro, the President of Venezuela, severs diplomatic and political ties with Panama, accusing Panama of being involved in a conspiracy against the Venezuelan government.
- March 31 – The United Nations International Court of Justice rules that Japan's Antarctic whaling program is not scientific but commercial and forbids grants of further permits.

=== April ===
- April 7 – The Donetsk People's Republic unilaterally declares its independence from Ukraine.
- April 10 – In response to the annexation of Crimea, the Parliamentary Assembly of the Council of Europe (PACE) passes a resolution to temporarily strip Russia of its voting rights; its rights to be represented in the Bureau of the Assembly, the PACE Presidential Committee, and the PACE Standing Committee; and its right to participate in election-observation missions.
- April 28 – United States President Barack Obama's new economic sanctions against Russia go into effect, targeting companies and individuals close to Russian President Vladimir Putin.

=== May ===
- May 22
  - The Royal Thai Army overthrows the caretaker government of Niwatthamrong Boonsongpaisan after a failure to resolve the political unrest in Thailand.
  - The Donetsk People's Republic and the Luhansk People's Republic declare the formation of Novorossiya, also referred to as the Union of People's Republics.

=== June ===
- June 5 – A Sunni militant group called the Islamic State of Iraq and the Levant (also known as the ISIS or ISIL) begins an offensive through northern Iraq, aiming to capture the Iraqi capital city of Baghdad and overthrow the Shiite government led by Prime Minister Nouri al-Maliki.

=== July ===
- July 8 – August 26 – Amid growing tensions between Israel and Hamas following the kidnapping and murder of three Israeli teenagers in June and the revenge killing of a Palestinian teenager in July, Israel launches Operation Protective Edge against Hamas-controlled Gaza Strip starting with numerous missile strikes, followed by a ground offensive a week later. In seven weeks of fighting, 2,100 Palestinians and 71 Israelis are killed.
- July 21 – The United Nations Security Council adopts Resolution 2166 in response to the shootdown of Malaysia Airlines Flight 17.

=== September ===
- September 22 – The United States and several Arab partners begin their airstrike campaign in Syria.

=== October ===
- October 31 – Longtime Burkina Faso President Blaise Compaoré resigns after widespread protests in response to his attempts to abolish presidential term limits.

=== December ===
- December 17 – U.S. President Barack Obama announces the resumption of normal relations between the U.S. and Cuba.

== See also ==
- List of state leaders in 2014
