= 2015 in politics =

These are some of the notable events relating to politics in 2015.

== Events ==
=== January ===
- January 1 – The Eurasian Economic Union comes into effect, creating a political and economic union between Russia, Belarus, Armenia, Kazakhstan and Kyrgyzstan.
- January 22 – After Houthi forces seize the presidential palace, Yemeni President Abd Rabbuh Mansur Hadi resigns after months of unrest.

=== February ===
- February 12
  - Leaders from Russia, Ukraine, Germany and France reach an agreement on the conflict in eastern Ukraine that includes a ceasefire and withdrawal of heavy weapons. However, several days later, the Ukrainian government and pro-Russian rebels claim that, within its first day, the ceasefire was broken 139 times, as both sides failed to withdraw their heavy weapons and fighting had continued.
  - The United Nations Security Council adopts Resolution 2199 to combat terrorism.

=== March ===
- March 12 – The Islamic State of Iraq and the Levant becomes allies with fellow jihadist group Boko Haram, effectively annexing the group.
- March 25 – A Saudi Arabia-led coalition of Arab countries starts a military intervention in Yemen in order to uphold the Yemeni government in its fight against the Houthis' southern offensive.

=== May ===
- May 20 – The two constituent republics of Novorossiya, the Donetsk People's Republic and the Luhansk People's Republic, announce the suspension of the Novorossiya project, returning to separate (though internationally unrecognised) states.
- May 23 – Ireland votes to legalize same-sex marriage, becoming the first country to legalize same-sex marriage by popular vote.

=== June ===
- June 6 – The governments of India and Bangladesh officially ratify their 1974 agreement to exchange enclaves along their border.
- June 25–26 – ISIL claim responsibility for three attacks around the world during Ramadan:
  - Kobanî massacre: ISIL fighters detonate three car bombs, enter Kobanî, Syria, and open fire at civilians, killing more than 220.
  - Sousse attacks: 22-year-old Seifeddine Rezgui opens fire at a tourist resort at Port El Kantaoui, Tunisia, killing 38 people.
  - Kuwait mosque bombing: A suicide bomber attacks the Shia Mosque Imam Ja'far as-Sadiq at Kuwait City, Kuwait, killing 27 people and injuring 227 others.

=== July ===
- July 20 – Cuba and the United States reestablish full diplomatic relations, ending a 54-year stretch of hostility between the nations.
- July 24 – Turkey begins a series of airstrikes against PKK and ISIL targets after the 2015 Suruç bombing.

=== September ===
- September 30 – Russia begins air strikes against ISIL and anti-government forces in Syria–in support of the Syrian government.

=== October ===
- October 19 – Justin Trudeau wins the 2015 Canadian federal election with a majority government.

=== November ===
- November 7 – Chinese and Taiwanese leaders, CCP general secretary Xi Jinping and Taiwanese president Ma Ying-jeou, formally meet for the first time.
- November 13 – Multiple terrorist attacks claimed by Islamic State of Iraq and the Levant (ISIL) in Paris, France, result in 130 fatalities.

=== December ===
- December 15 – The Islamic Military Alliance is formed in order to fight terrorism.
