= 2013 national electoral calendar =

National and federal elections held in 2013

- Countries with national elections or referendums: Executive Legislative Executive and Legislative Referendum Legislative and Referendum Executive, Legislative and Referendum Constitutional Assembly

This national electoral calendar for 2013 lists the national/federal elections held in 2013 in all sovereign states and their dependent territories. By-elections are excluded, though national referendums are included.

== January ==
- 11–12 January: Czech Republic, President (1st round)
- 20 January: Austria, Referendum
- 22 January: Israel, Parliament
- 23 January: Jordan, House of Representatives
- 25–26 January: Czech Republic, President (2nd round)
- 27 January: Bulgaria, Referendum
- 28 January: Bahamas, Referendum

== February ==
- 3 February:
  - Cuba, Parliament
  - Liechtenstein, Parliament
- 10 February: Monaco, Parliament
- 17 February:
  - Cyprus, President (1st round)
  - Ecuador, President and Parliament
- 18 February: Armenia, President
- 19 February: Grenada, House of Representatives
- 21 February: Barbados, House of Assembly
- 22 February: Djibouti, Parliament
- 24 February: Cyprus, President (2nd round)
- 24–25 February: Italy, Chamber of Deputies and Senate

== March ==
- 3 March: Switzerland, Referendums
- 4 March: Kenya, President, National Assembly and Senate
- 5 March: Federated States of Micronesia, Parliament
- 9 March: Malta, Parliament
- 10–11 March: Falkland Islands, Referendum
- 12 March: Greenland, Legislature
- 13 March: Norfolk Island, Legislature
- 16 March: Zimbabwe, Constitutional Referendum

== April ==
- 7 April: Montenegro, President
- 14 April: Venezuela, President
- 21 April:
  - French Polynesia, Legislature (1st round)
  - Paraguay, President, Chamber of Deputies and Senate
- 23 April: Bhutan, National Council
- 24 April: Jersey, Referendum
- 27 April: Iceland, Parliament

== May ==
- 5 May:
  - French Polynesia, Legislature (2nd round)
  - Malaysia, House of Representatives
- 11 May: Pakistan, National Assembly
- 12 May: Bulgaria, Parliament
- 13 May: Philippines, House of Representatives and Senate
- 22 May: Cayman Islands, Legislature
- 26 May: Equatorial Guinea, Chamber of Deputies and Senate
- 31 May: Bhutan, National Assembly (1st round)

== June ==
- 8 June: Nauru, Parliament
- 9 June: Switzerland, Referendums
- 14 June: Iran, President
- 23 June: Albania, Parliament
- 26 June: Mongolia, President

== July ==
- 13 July: Bhutan, National Assembly (2nd round)
- 21 July: Japan, House of Councillors
- 25 July: Togo, Parliament
- 27 July: Kuwait, Parliament
- 28 July:
  - Cambodia, National Assembly
  - Mali, President (1st round)
  - Northern Cyprus, Parliament
- 31 July: Zimbabwe, President, National Assembly and Senate

== August ==
- 11 August: Mali, President (2nd round)

== September ==
- 7 September:
  - Australia, House of Representatives and Senate
  - Maldives, ~~President (1st round)~~ (election nullified)
- 8–9 September: Norway, Parliament
- 15 September: Macau, Legislature
- 16–18 September: Rwanda, Chamber of Deputies
- 20 September: Swaziland, House of Assembly
- 22 September:
  - Germany, Bundestag
  - Switzerland, Referendums
- 27 September: Aruba, Legislature
- 28 September: Guinea, Parliament
- 29 September: Austria, National Council
- 30 September: Cameroon, National Assembly

== October ==
- 4 October: Ireland, Constitutional Referendums
- 9 October: Azerbaijan, President
- 20 October:
  - Luxembourg, Parliament
  - San Marino, Referendums
- 25 October: Madagascar, President (1st round)
- 25–26 October: Czech Republic, Chamber of Deputies
- 27 October:
  - Argentina, Chamber of Deputies and Senate
  - Georgia, President

== November ==
- 6 November: Tajikistan, President
- 7 November: Falkland Islands, Legislature
- 9 November: Maldives, President (1st round revote)
- 12 November: Pitcairn Islands, Mayor, Deputy Mayor and Legislature
- 16 November: Maldives, President (2nd round)
- 17 November: Chile, President (1st round), Chamber of Deputies and Senate
- 19 November: Nepal, Constituent Assembly
- 23 November: Mauritania, Parliament (1st round)
- 24 November:
  - Honduras, President and Parliament
  - Mali, Parliament (1st round)
  - Switzerland, Referendums

== December ==
- 1 December: Croatia, Constitutional Referendum
- 13 December: New Zealand, Referendum
- 15 December:
  - Chile, President (2nd round)
  - Mali, Parliament (2nd round)
  - Turkmenistan, Assembly
- 20 December: Madagascar, President (2nd round) and National Assembly
- 21 December: Mauritania, Parliament (2nd round)

== Indirect elections ==
The following indirect elections of heads of state and the upper houses of bicameral legislatures took place through votes in elected lower houses, unicameral legislatures, or electoral colleges:

- 15 February: Trinidad and Tobago, President
- 24 February: Cuba, President and Council of State
- 12–13 March: Vatican City, Pope
- 18 March: Isle of Man, Legislative Council
- 28 March, 24 April, 24 May and 19 June: Austria, Federal Council
- 1 April: San Marino, Captains Regent
- 14 April: Cameroon, Senate
- 18–20 April: Italy, President
- 22 April: Bangladesh, President
- 30 May and 27 June: India, Council of States
- 11 June: Nauru, President
- 30 July: Pakistan, President
- 30 September: Dominica, President
- 1 October: San Marino, Captains Regent
- 7 October: Ethiopia, President

== See also ==
- 2013 in politics
