= Diarmaid Ferriter =

Irish historian (born 1972)

- Born: February 1972 (age 54); Dublin, Ireland

Academic background
- Education: University College Dublin

Academic work
- Discipline: Historian
- Institutions: University College Dublin

Diarmaid Ferriter (born February 1972) is an Irish historian, broadcaster, and university professor. He has written fourteen books on the subject of Irish history, and co-authored another. Ferriter attended St. Benildus College in Kilmacud in Dublin and University College Dublin.

== Career ==
Since 2008, Ferriter is Professor of Modern Irish History at University College Dublin. He was formerly a senior lecturer in history at St. Patrick's College, Drumcondra, Dublin City University, and he was Burns Scholar at Boston College from 2008 to 2009. From 2003 to 2009, Ferriter hosted What If, a Sunday morning radio programme on RTÉ 1 and presented RTE's The History Show from 2011 to 2012. He continues to cover a range of Irish historical matters on RTE and the BBC. His 2007 biography of Éamon de Valera, Judging Dev, won in three categories of the 2008 Irish Book Awards.

Beyond academia, Ferriter has developed a public profile in media and politics as an advocate of public history and the greater availability of archival material. He was appointed a member of the Expert Advisory Group on Centenary Commemorations by the Taoiseach in 2011. He has also served on the Board of the National Library of Ireland and as a member of the Irish Archives Advisory Council. He worked on multiple television projects, presenting a three-part television series, The Limits of Liberty, and later co-writing the 2018 documentary Keepers of the Flame. In 2013, he publicly supported the political campaign Democracy Matters, which opposed proposals to abolish the Irish Senate. He was also centrally involved in the campaign to retain history as a core subject on the Irish Junior Certificate curriculum. In 2014, he began writing as a weekly columnist for The Irish Times. He presents the weekly RTE history podcast, What Were We Like?, with archivist Catriona Crowe. In March 2019, Ferriter was elected a member of the Royal Irish Academy, Ireland's highest academic honour, for being "the most consistently innovative interpreter of the modern Irish historical experience".

== Personal life ==
Ferriter is married to Sheila Maher; they live in Dublin with their three children.

== Bibliography ==
- A Nation of Extremes; the pioneers in twentieth-century Ireland. Irish Academic Press. ISBN 978-0-7165-2623-0
- Mothers, Maidens and Myths: A History of the Irish Countrywomen's Association
- Cuimhnigh Ar Luimneach: A history of Limerick County Council, 1898–1998.
- Lovers of Liberty? Local government in twentieth-century Ireland
- The Irish Famine (co-authored with Colm Tóibín). Profile Books Ltd. ISBN 1-86197-460-4
- The Transformation of Ireland: 1900–2000. Profile Books Ltd. ISBN 1-58567-681-0
- What If? Alternative Views of Twentieth-Century Ireland. Gill & Macmillan. ISBN 0-7171-3990-5
- Judging Dev: A Reassessment of the Life and Legacy of Eamon de Valera. Royal Irish Academy Oct 2007. ISBN 1-904890-28-8
- Occasions of Sin: Sex and Society in Modern Ireland, Profile Books Ltd, September 2009
- Ambiguous Republic: Ireland in the 1970s. Profile Books Ltd, November 2012. ISBN 978-1-84668-468-5.
- A Nation and not a Rabble: The Irish Revolution 1913-23. Profile Books Ltd, March 2015. ISBN 978-1781250419
- On the Edge: Ireland's Offshore Islands: A Modern History. Profile Books, Ltd, September 2018 ISBN 978-1-78125-643-5
- The Border: The Legacy of a Century of Anglo-Irish Politics. Profile Books, Ltd, February 2019 ISBN 978-1-78816-178-7
- Between Two Hells: The Irish Civil War. Profile Books, Ltd, September 2021 ISBN 978-1-78816-174-9
- The Revelation of Ireland 1995-2020. Profile Books, September 2024, ISBN 978-1-8008-10945

== See also ==
- Meda Ryan
