= Swiss Armed Forces =

Military of Switzerland

- Schweizer Armee (German); Armée suisse (French); Esercito svizzero (Italian); Armada svizra (Romansh)
- Service branches: Swiss Army; Swiss Air Force
- Website: www.vtg.admin.ch www.armee.ch

Leadership
- Commander-in-chief: Vacant in peacetime
- Minister of Defence: Martin Pfister
- Chief of the Armed Forces: Lt Gen Benedikt Roos

Personnel
- Military age: 19 years of age for male compulsory military service; 18 years of age for voluntary male and female military service;
- Conscription: 19–34 years of age (males only); 40 for subaltern officers, 50 for staff officers and higher
- Active personnel: 147,017

Expenditure
- Budget: CHF 7.5 billion (~US$9.45 billion, 2025)
- Percent of GDP: 1.0% (2025)

Industry
- Domestic suppliers: MOWAG; RUAG; SIG; Swiss Arms

Related articles
- Ranks: Military ranks of Switzerland

The Swiss Armed Forces (German: Schweizer Armee; French: Armée suisse; Italian: Esercito svizzero; Romansh: Armada svizra; lit. 'Swiss Army') are the military forces of Switzerland, consisting of land and air service branches. Under the country's militia system, regular soldiers constitute a small part of the military and the rest are conscripts or volunteers aged 19 to 34 (in some cases up to 50). Because of Switzerland's long history of neutrality, the Swiss Armed Forces have not been involved in foreign wars since the early 19th century, but do participate in international peacekeeping missions. Switzerland is part of the NATO Partnership for Peace programme.

The regulations of the Swiss militia system stipulate that the soldiers keep their own personal equipment, including all personally assigned weapons, at home or in an armoury; until 2007 this also included ammunition. Compulsory military service applies to all male Swiss citizens, with women serving voluntarily. Males usually receive initial orders at the age of 18 for military conscription eligibility screening. About two-thirds of young Swiss men are found suitable for service, while alternative service exists for those found unsuitable. Annually, approximately 20,000 persons undergo basic training for 18 weeks (23 weeks for special forces).

In 2003, the reform "Army XXI" replaced the previous model "Army 95" and was adopted by popular vote, reducing manpower from 400,000 to about 200,000 personnel, with 120,000 receiving periodic military training and 80,000 reservists who have completed their total military training requirements. A further reform effective in 2018 heralded the reduction of forces to 100,000 members.

== History ==
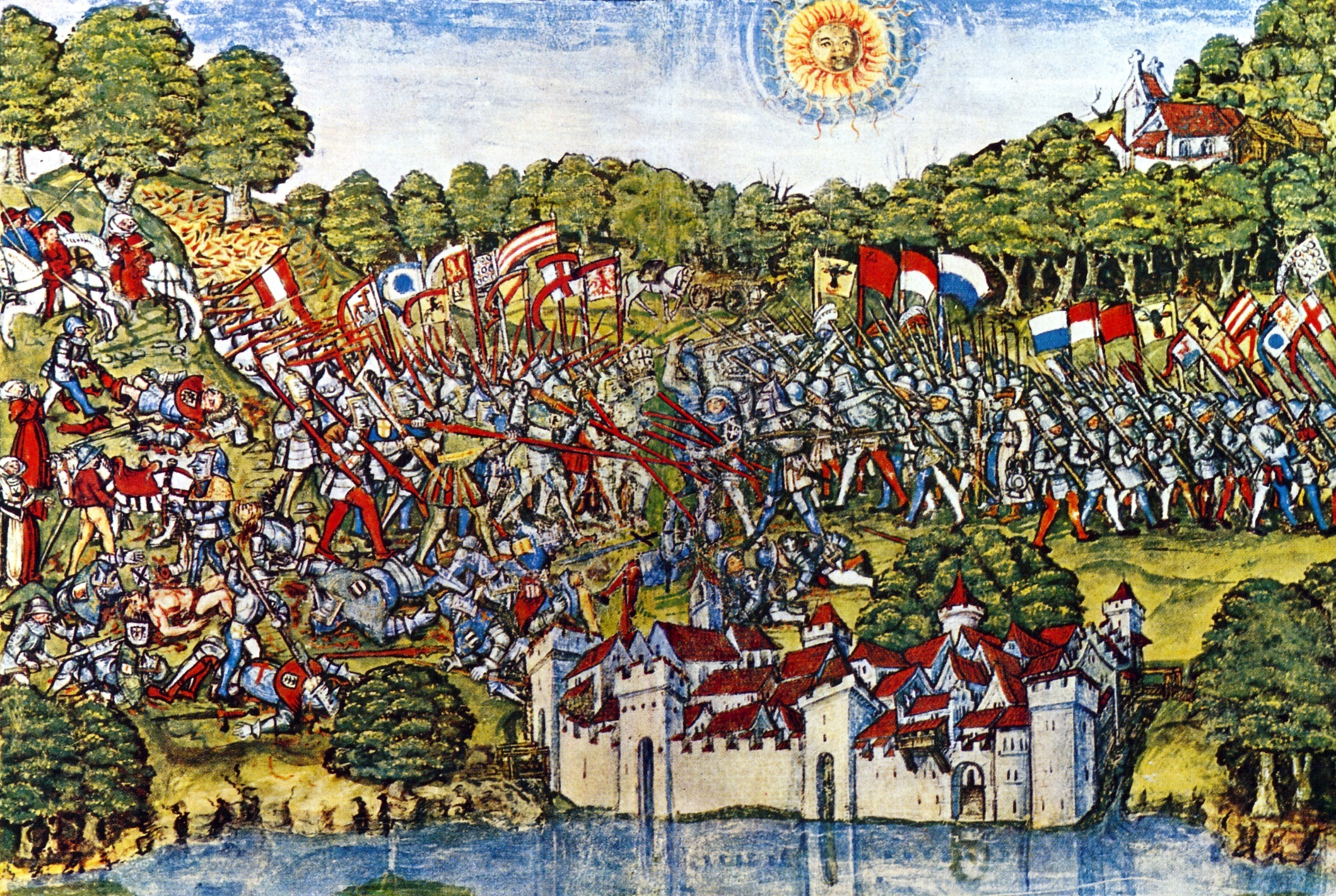
The Battle of Sempach, 1386

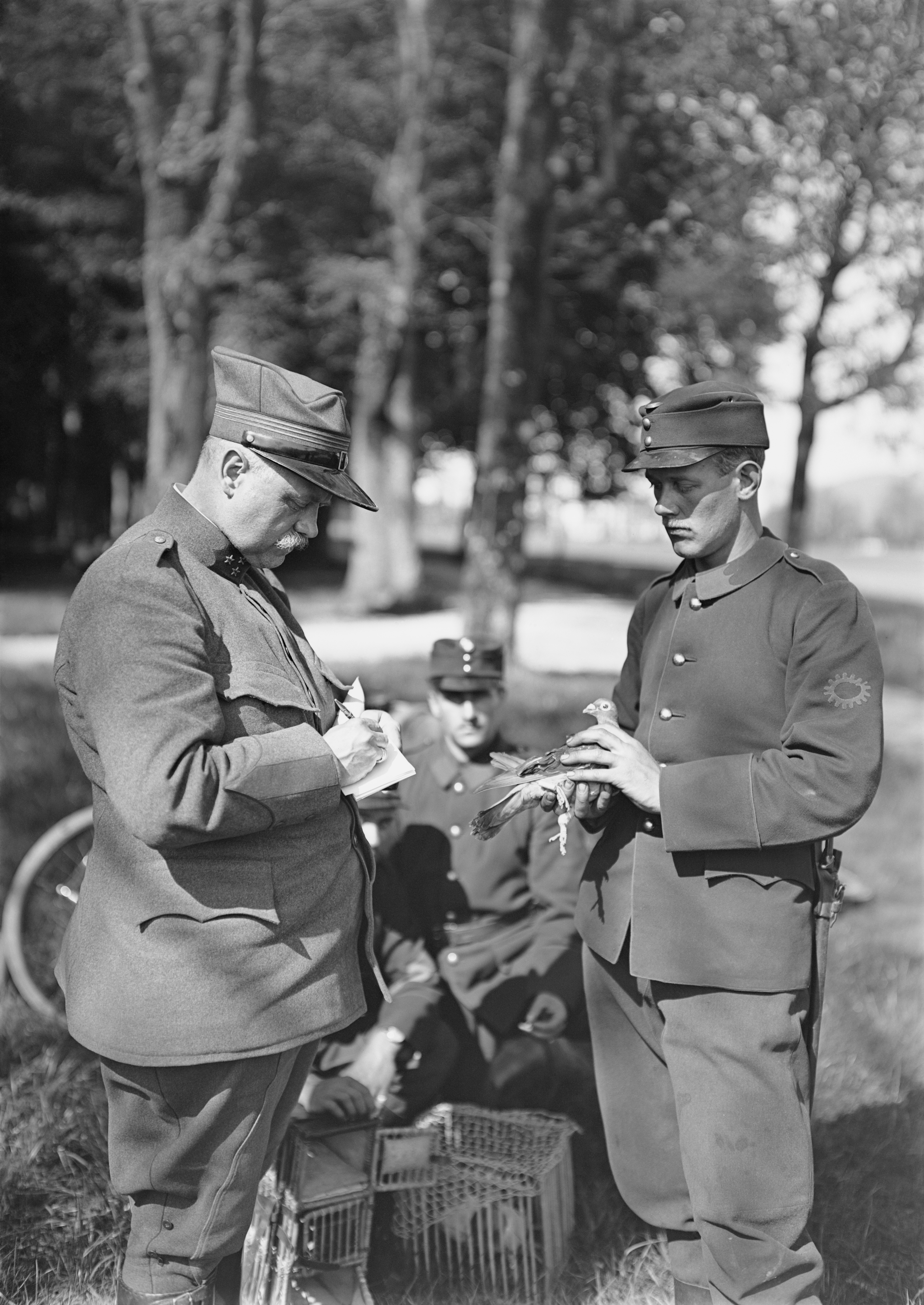
Swiss soldiers with war pigeons during World War I

The land component of the Swiss Armed Forces originated from the cantonal troops of the Old Swiss Confederacy, called upon in cases of external threats by the Tagsatzung or by the canton in distress. In the federal treaty of 1815, the Tagsatzung prescribed cantonal troops to put a contingent of 2% of the population of each canton at the federation's disposition, amounting to a force of some 33,000 men. The cantonal armies were converted into the federal army (Bundesheer) with the constitution of 1848. From this time, it was illegal for the individual cantons to declare war or to sign capitulations or peace agreements. Paragraph 13 explicitly prohibited the federation from sustaining a standing army, and the cantons were allowed a maximum standing force of 300 each (not including the Landjäger corps, a kind of police force). Paragraph 18 declared the "obligation" of every Swiss citizen to serve in the federal army if conscripted (Wehrpflicht), setting its size at 3% of the population plus a reserve of one and one half that number, amounting to a total force of some 80,000.

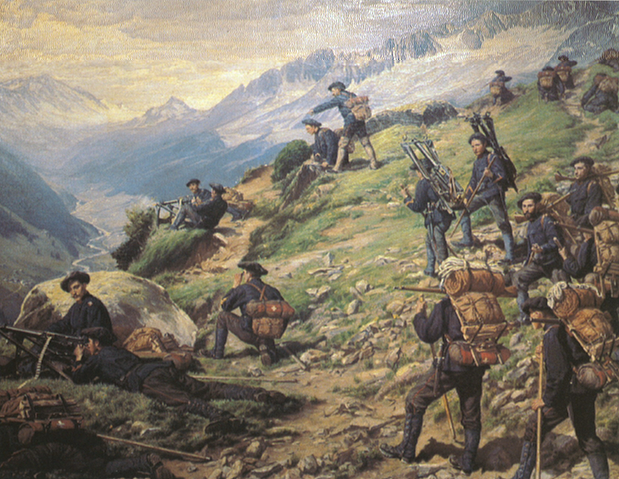
A Swiss Army exercise in 1896, as depicted by Joseph Clemens Kaufmann

The first complete mobilization, under the command of Hans Herzog, was triggered by the Franco-Prussian War in 1871. In 1875, the army was called in to crush a strike of workers at the Gotthard tunnel. Four workers were killed and 13 were severely wounded.

Paragraph 19 of the revised constitution of 1874 extended the definition of the federal army to every able-bodied male citizen, which would have swollen the size of the army, had it not been replaced by later revisions, from under 150,000 to more than 700,000, with population growth during the 20th century rising further to some 1.5 million, the second largest armed force per capita after the Israel Defense Forces.

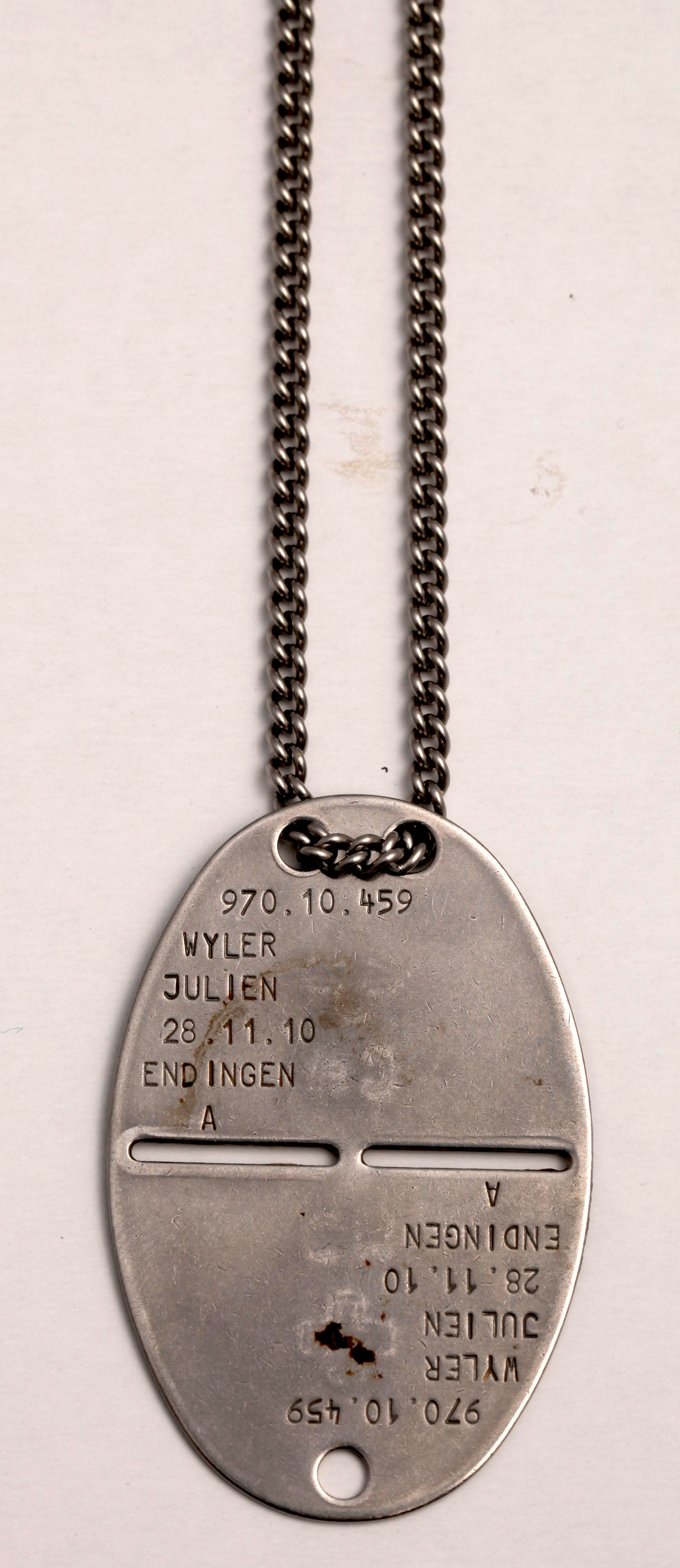
Military badge belonging to Julien Wyler, 1929, in the collection of the Jewish Museum of Switzerland

Prior to the revised constitution, Jews in Switzerland were excluded from the army, with various exceptions and special conditions through the years. In 1808, the laws of mandatory military service were particularly strict for Jews, who, unlike Christians, could not opt to be replaced by a volunteer. During this time, Jews were not considered to be Swiss citizens. Following the introduction of Jewish corporations in 1813, they were given separate documentation for military enlistment. A special rule in 1816 demanded that the Jews should pay an equipment contribution of 1000 francs per year (400 francs in 1808). From 1852 onwards, Jews served in the army like other Swiss citizens, and the constitution of 1874 removed all remaining discriminatory measures.

A major manoeuvre commanded in 1912 by Ulrich Wille, a reputed Germanophile, convinced visiting European heads of state, in particular Kaiser Wilhelm II, of the efficacy and determination of Swiss defences. Wille was subsequently put in command of the second complete mobilization in 1914, and Switzerland escaped invasion in the course of World War I. Wille also ordered the suppression of the 1918 general strike (Landesstreik) with military force. Three workers were killed, and a rather larger number of soldiers died of the Spanish flu during mobilization. In 1932, the army was called to suppress an anti-fascist demonstration in Geneva. The troops shot dead 13 demonstrators, wounding another 65. This incident long damaged the army's reputation, leading to persistent calls for its abolition among left-wing politicians. In both the 1918 and the 1932 incidents, the troops deployed were consciously selected from rural regions such as the Berner Oberland, fanning the enmity between the traditionally conservative rural population and the urban working class. The third complete mobilization of the army took place during World War II under the command of Henri Guisan (see also Switzerland during the World Wars). The Patrouille des Glaciers race, meant to test the abilities of soldiers, was created during the war.

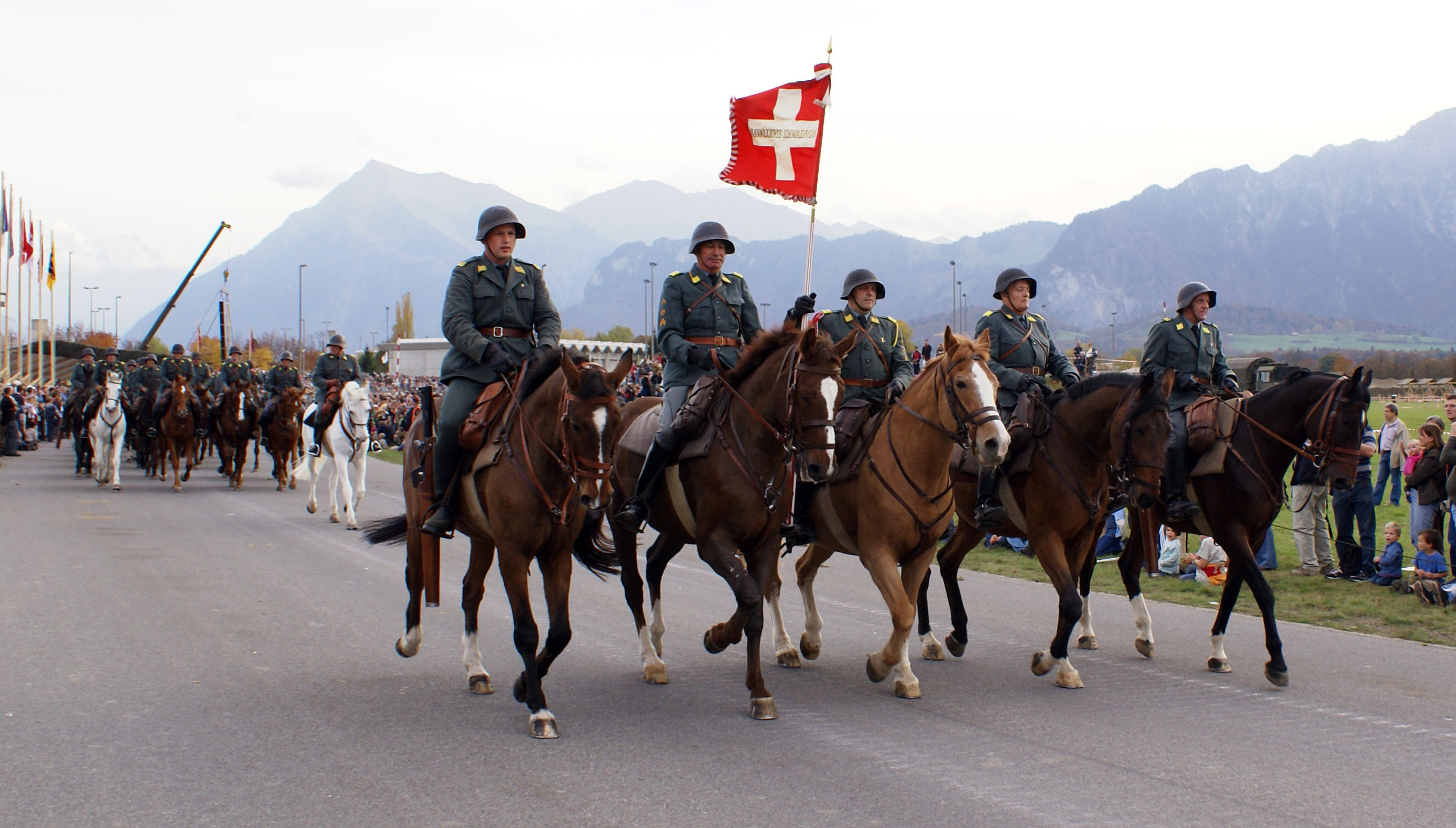
Veterans' dragoons squadron in 2006, presenting the uniform of 1972

In the 1960s and 1970s, the armed forces were organised according to the "Armee 61" structure. Horse mounted cavalry (specifically dragoons) were retained for combat roles until 1973, and were the last non-ceremonial horse cavalry in Europe, as were bicycle infantry battalions until 2001.

Since 1989, there have been several attempts to curb military activity or even abolish the armed forces altogether. A notable referendum on the subject was held on 26 November 1989 and, although defeated, did see a significant percentage of the voters in favour of such an initiative. However, a similar referendum, called for before, but held shortly after the 11 September attacks in 2001 in the US, was defeated by over 77% of voters.

In 1989, the status of the army as a national icon was shaken by a popular initiative aiming at its complete dissolution (see: Group for a Switzerland without an Army) receiving 35.6% support. This triggered a series of reforms and, in 1995, the number of troops was reduced to 400,000 ("Armee 95"). Article 58.1 of the 1999 constitution repeats that the army is "in principle" organized as a militia, implicitly allowing a small number of professional soldiers. A second initiative aimed at the army's dissolution in late 2001 received a mere 21.9% support. Nevertheless, the army was shrunk again in 2004, to 220,000 men ("Armee XXI"), including the reserves.

In 2016, the Swiss Federal Assembly voted to further reduce the army from 140,000 men to 100,000 men, reducing the time of basic training from 21 weeks to 18, but also to increase the military budget by 2.4 billion Swiss francs. In 2022, the Assembly voted to increase spending by 1.4 billion Swiss francs by 2030, or at least 1% of the country's GDP. The government planned to spend up to 50 billion Swiss francs on defense through the early 2030s. In 2024, the Armed Forces was projected to face significant funding shortfalls.

== Personnel ==
As of 1 March 2017, the Swiss Armed Forces consist of 120,496 people on active duty (in Switzerland called Angehöriger der Armee, shortly AdA, engl.: Member of the Armed Forces), of which 9,163 are professionals, with the rest being conscripts or volunteers. Women, for whom military service is voluntary, numbered 929: less than 1% of the total, with over 25% thereof being officers. The numbers had increased by 2021. Once in service, women have the same rights and duties as their male colleagues, and they can join all services, including combat units. Recruits in multi-lingual Switzerland are usually instructed in their native language, except that the small number of Romansh-speaking recruits are instructed in German.

In contrast to most other comparable armed forces, officers are generally not career regulars. Under the most recent army reform, all soldiers complete a full recruit school of 18 weeks. During the initial 18-week training period, recruits may volunteer for consideration to continue with NCO training. After the completion of NCO training, individuals are promoted to sergeant and integrated into platoons at recruit schools as squad leaders (Gruppenchefs, Chefs de Groupe, Capogruppi). Squad leaders support their platoon commanders for the 18-week duration of the recruit school, with the exception of those who volunteer for officer school—they leave after 7 weeks of service as squad leaders—while those who volunteer for higher NCO school leave after 12 weeks of service as squad leaders. Officer candidates complete a 15-week course to prepare them for their role as platoon leaders (Zugführer, Chef de section, Caposezione), which traditionally culminates in a march covering 100 kilometres (62 mi) in 24 hours. After promotion to lieutenant, platoon leaders return to their recruit schools, where they take charge of a recruit school platoon for 18 weeks.

There were about 15,000 officers and 29,000 NCOs in the Swiss Armed Forces in 2021. Those of higher rank serve for longer each year; a private may serve 365 days over 30 years, while a high-ranking officer may serve 2,000 days before retiring. Each promotion requires more time, which is known as "paying your rank". This describes the mechanism of a soldier fulfilling their rank's minimal service time after being promoted into said rank. Companies subsidize military training by continuing to pay their employees, who list their ranks and responsibilities on their résumés.

In January 2023, the Swiss Armed Forces began integrating Muslim and Jewish chaplains into the service. The army's chaplaincy had only been open to Catholics and Protestants until then. New insignia have been created for military jackets: the Islamic crescent for Muslims and the Tablets of Stone for Jews.

=== Conscription ===
Switzerland has mandatory military service for all able-bodied male citizens, who are conscripted when they reach the age of majority, though women may volunteer for any position. Since 1996, conscripts who are found to be sufficiently fit for regular military service, but who object for reasons of conscience, can apply for civilian service; in 2024 this accounted for 27% of conscripts deemed fit for service. This service consists of various kinds of social services, such as reconstructing cultural sites, helping the elderly and other activities removed from military connotations. Civilian service lasts 340 days, 50% longer than a soldier's regular army service.

People determined unfit for service, where fitness is defined as "satisfying physical, intellectual and psychological requirements for military service or civil protection service and being capable of accomplishing these services without harming oneself or others", are exempted from service, but pay 11 installments of a 3% additional annual income tax until the age of 37 unless they are affected by a disability. Conscripts found to be sufficiently unfit for regular military service, but not for exemption, take part in civil protection, where they may be called on to assist the police, fire or health departments, as well as natural disaster relief and crowd control during demonstrations or events with large attendance.

Almost 20% of all conscripts were found unfit for military or civilian service in 2008; the rate is generally higher in urban cantons such as Zurich and Geneva than in rural ones while in 2014 it was 38% and more recently in 2024 30%. Swiss citizens living abroad are generally exempted from conscription in peacetime. Dual citizenship does not grant exemption.

On 22 September 2013, a referendum was held that aimed to abolish conscription in Switzerland. With a turnout of 47% on this particular question, over 73% voted against eliminating conscription.

== Structure ==
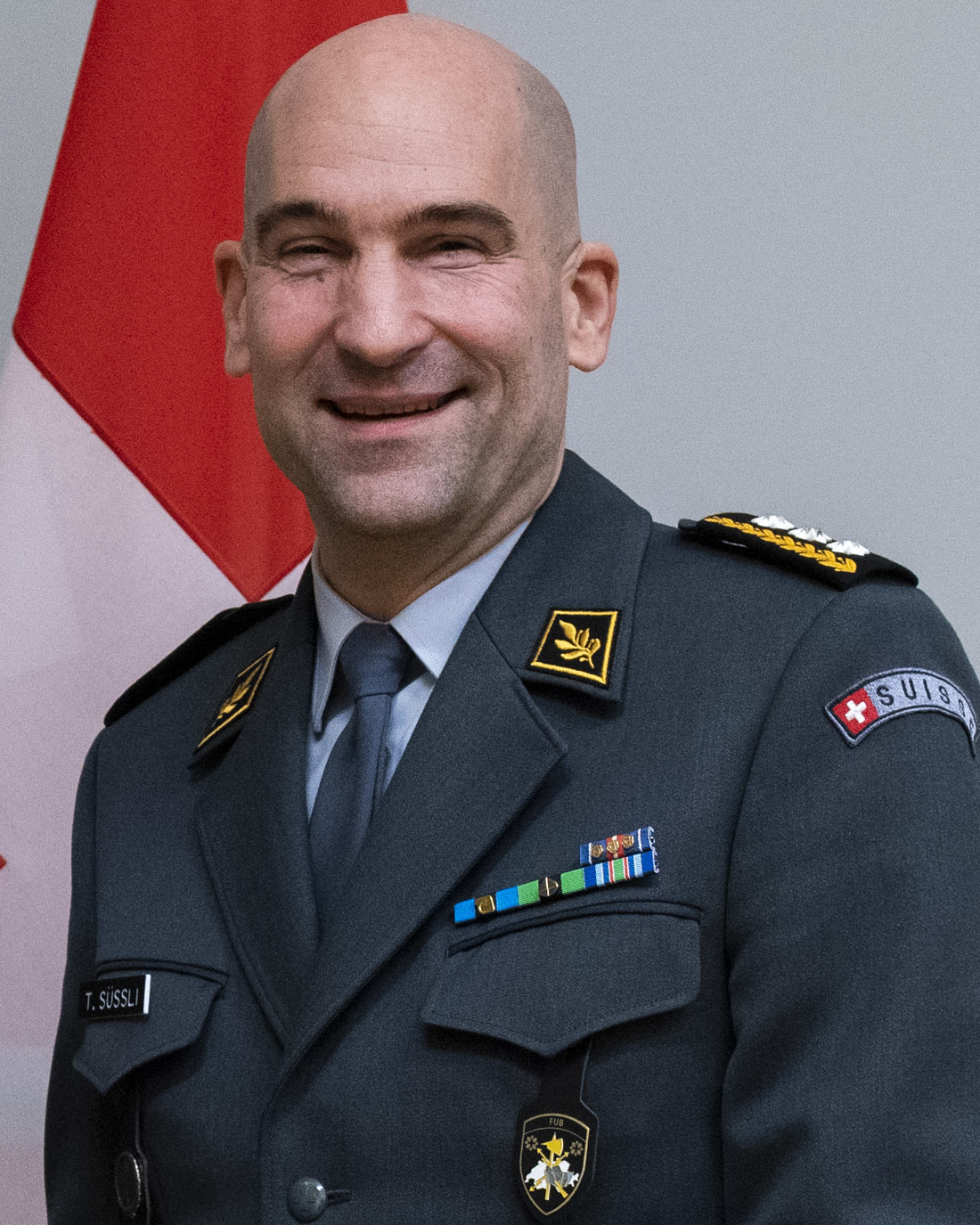
Thomas Süssli, chief of the Swiss Armed Forces from 2020-2025.

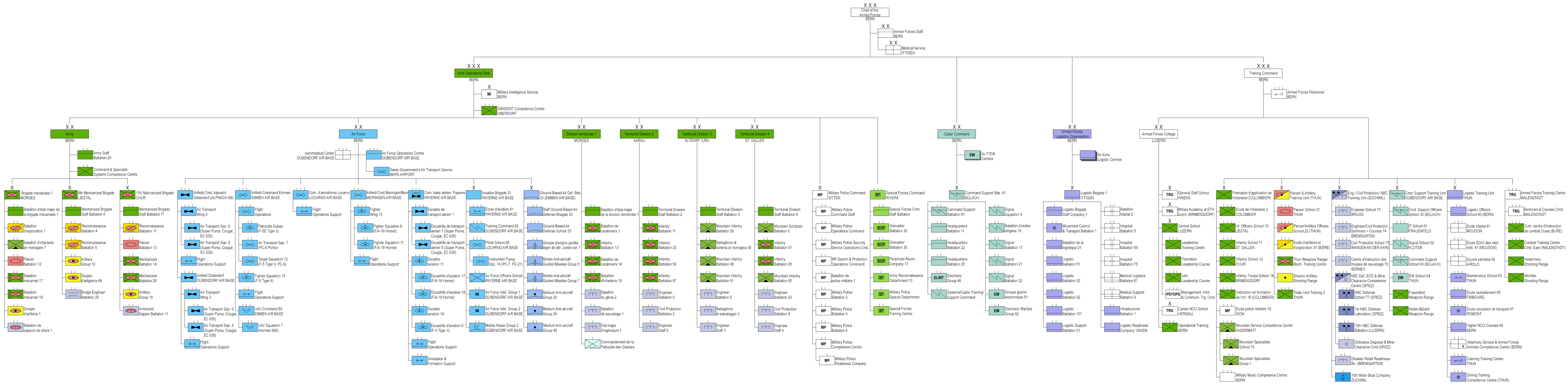
Swiss Armed Forces organization 2025 (click to enlarge)

In peacetime, the Swiss Armed Forces are led by the Chief of the Armed Forces (Chef der Armee), who reports to the head of the Federal Department of Defence, Civil Protection and Sport and to the Swiss Federal Council as a whole. The current Chief of the Armed Forces is Lieutenant-General (Korpskommandant) Benedikt Roos. Lt-Gen Roos replaced Lieutenant-General (Korpskommandant) Thomas Süssli on 1 January 2026.

- Chief of the Armed Forces, in Bern
  - Joint Operations Command, in Bern, Lt Gen Laurent Michaud
  - Training and Education Command, in Bern, Lt Gen Georg Metzler
  - Armed Forces Cyber Division, in Bern, Maj Gen Simon Müller
  - Armed Forces Logistics Organisation, in Bern, Maj Gen Rolf Siegenthaler
    - Medical Service, in Ittigen
  - Armed Forces Staff, in Bern, Maj Gen Daniel Keller

In times of crisis or war, the Federal Assembly elects a full General (OF-9) as Commander-in-Chief of the Armed Forces (Oberbefehlshaber der Armee). The rank is distinct and particular, as it is associated exclusively with wartime fighting or a national crisis due to war among Switzerland's neighbouring countries.

Swiss Army brigades
Swiss Air Force airbases

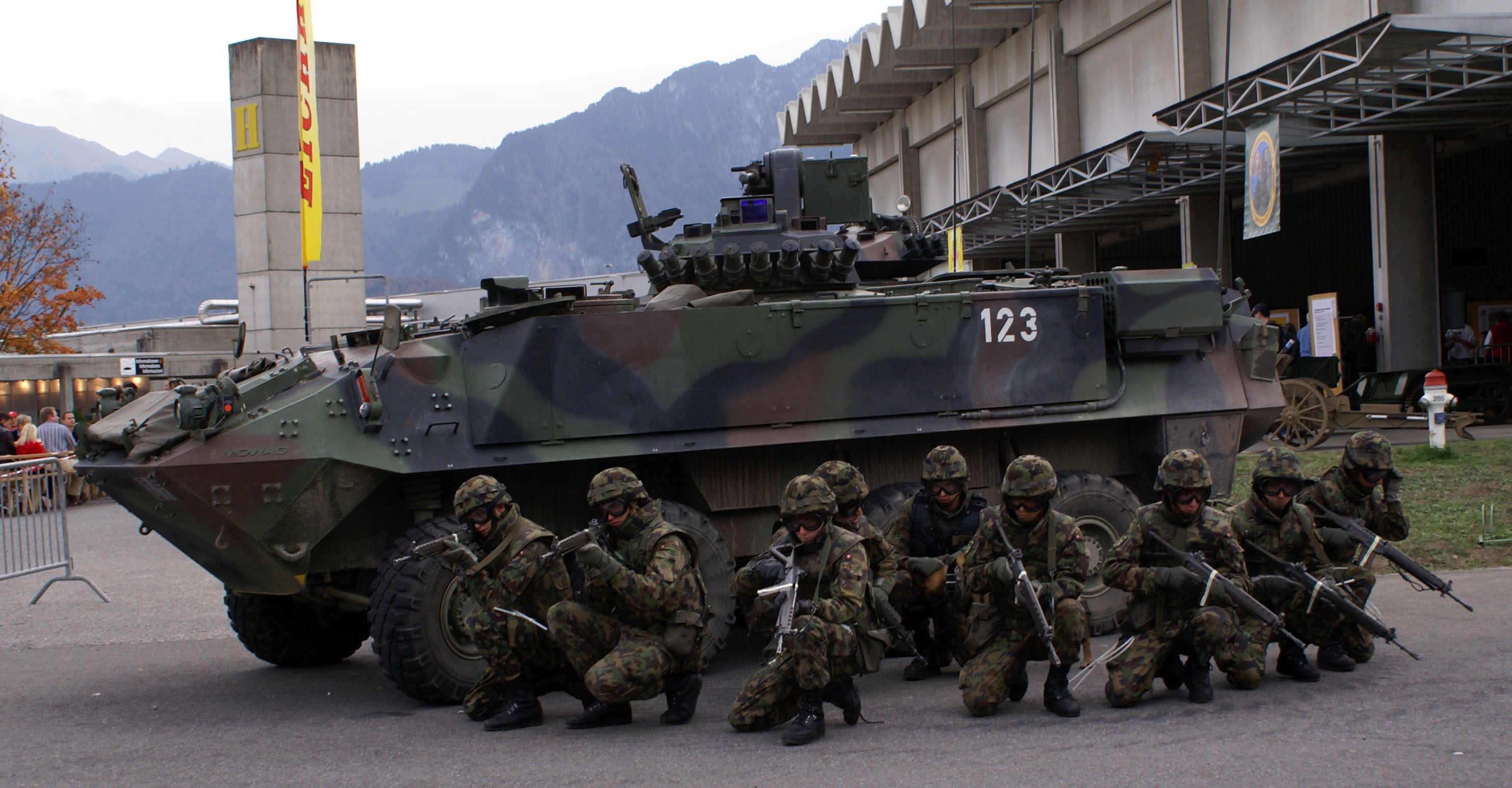
Infantry squad and Mowag Piranha during presentation

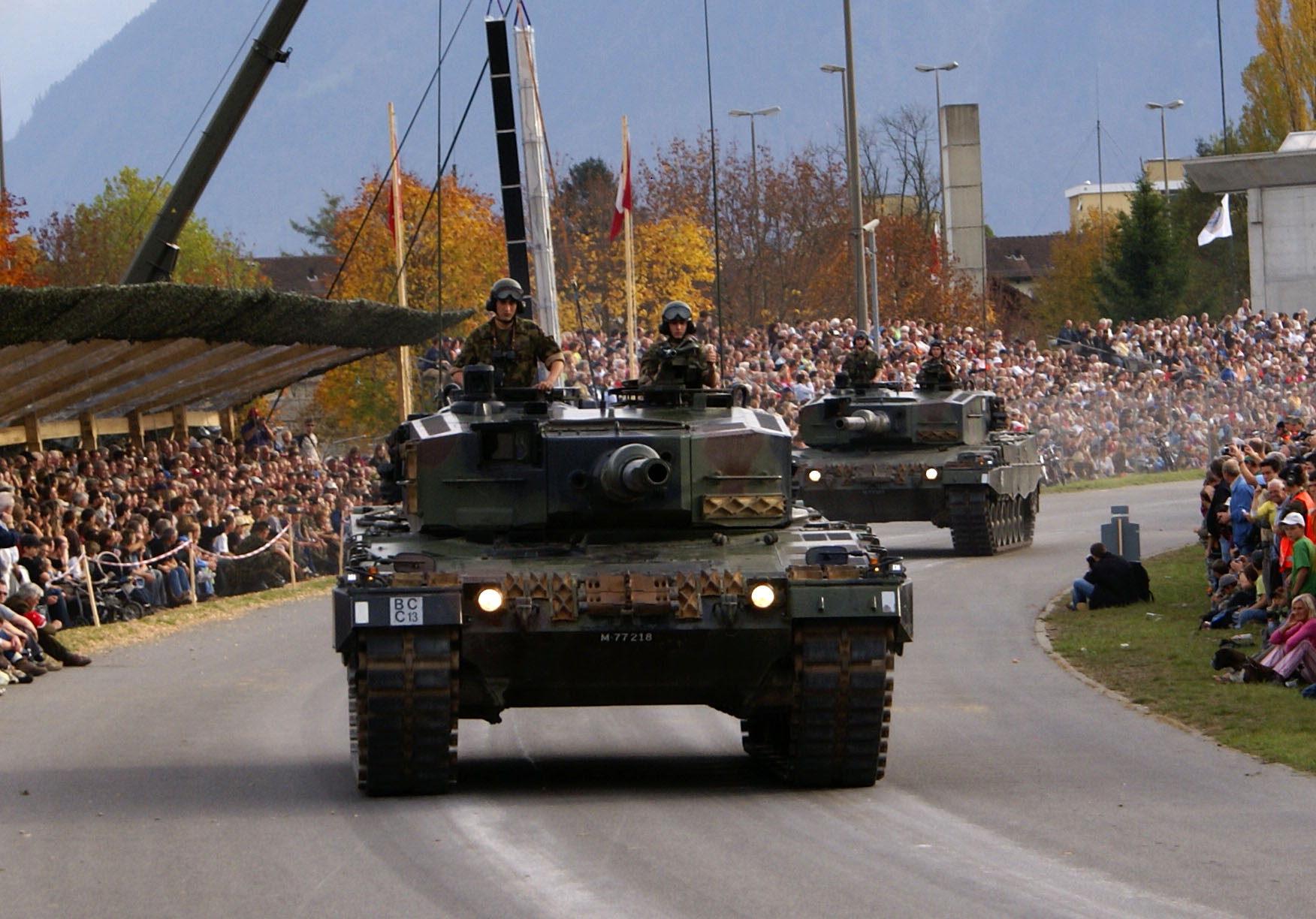
Leopard 87 main battle tanks

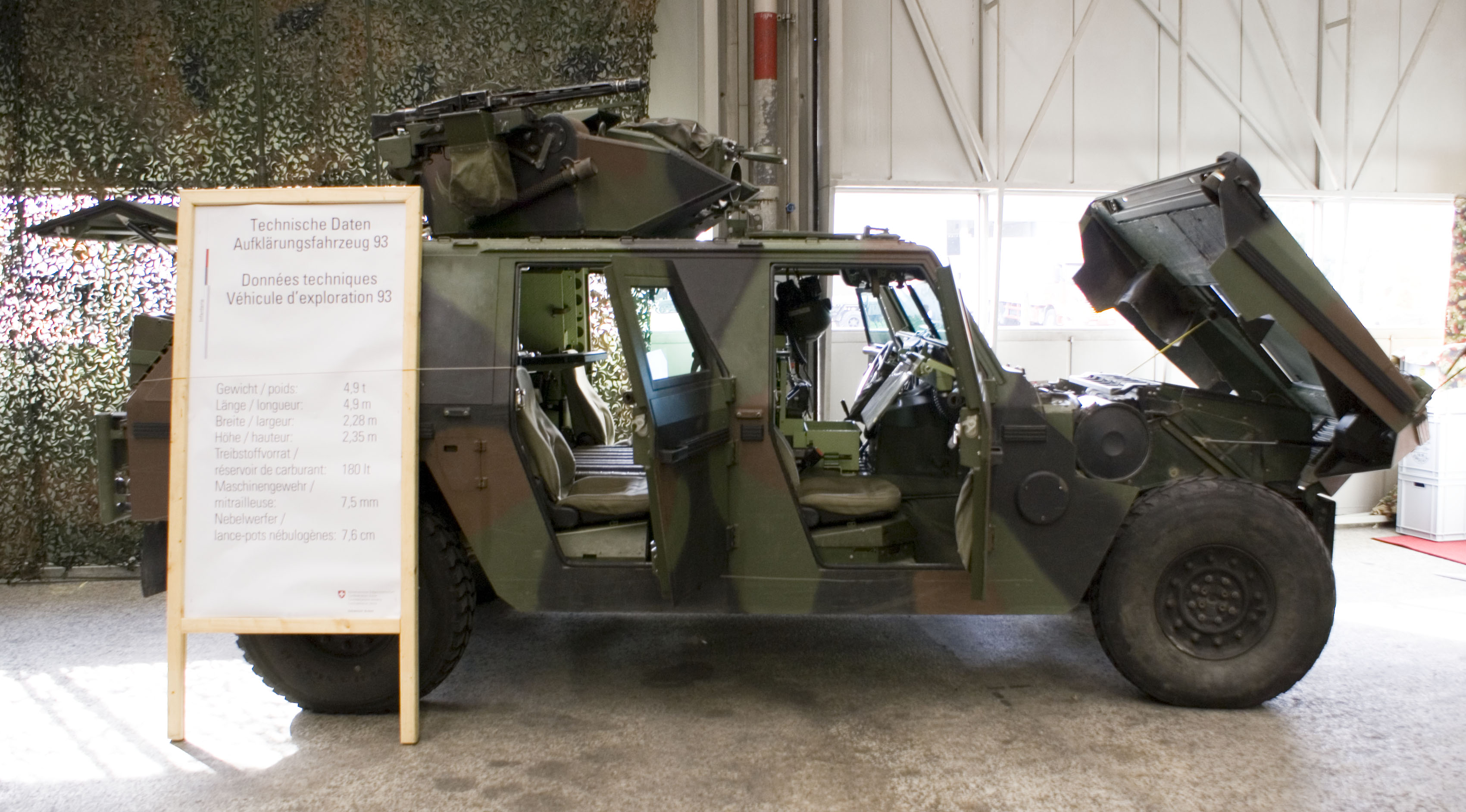
Mowag Eagle Swiss army reconnaissance vehicle

== Army ==
Under the "Armee 61" structure, the Army was organised into Field Army Corps 1, 2, and 4, and Mountain Army Corps 3. This structure was superseded by the "Armee 95" structure and thereafter the "Armee XXI" structure.

Since the Army XXI reform in 2004, the basic structure of the Army has been reorganised in the following units: infantry brigades (2 and 5); mountain infantry brigades (9 and 12); armoured brigades (1 and 11). Additionally two large reserve brigades (Infantry Brigade 7 and Mountain Brigade 10) exist. Four territorial divisions link the Army with the cantons by co-ordinating territorial tasks inside their sector and are immediately responsible for the security of their regions, depending only on the decisions of the Federal Council.

== Air Force ==
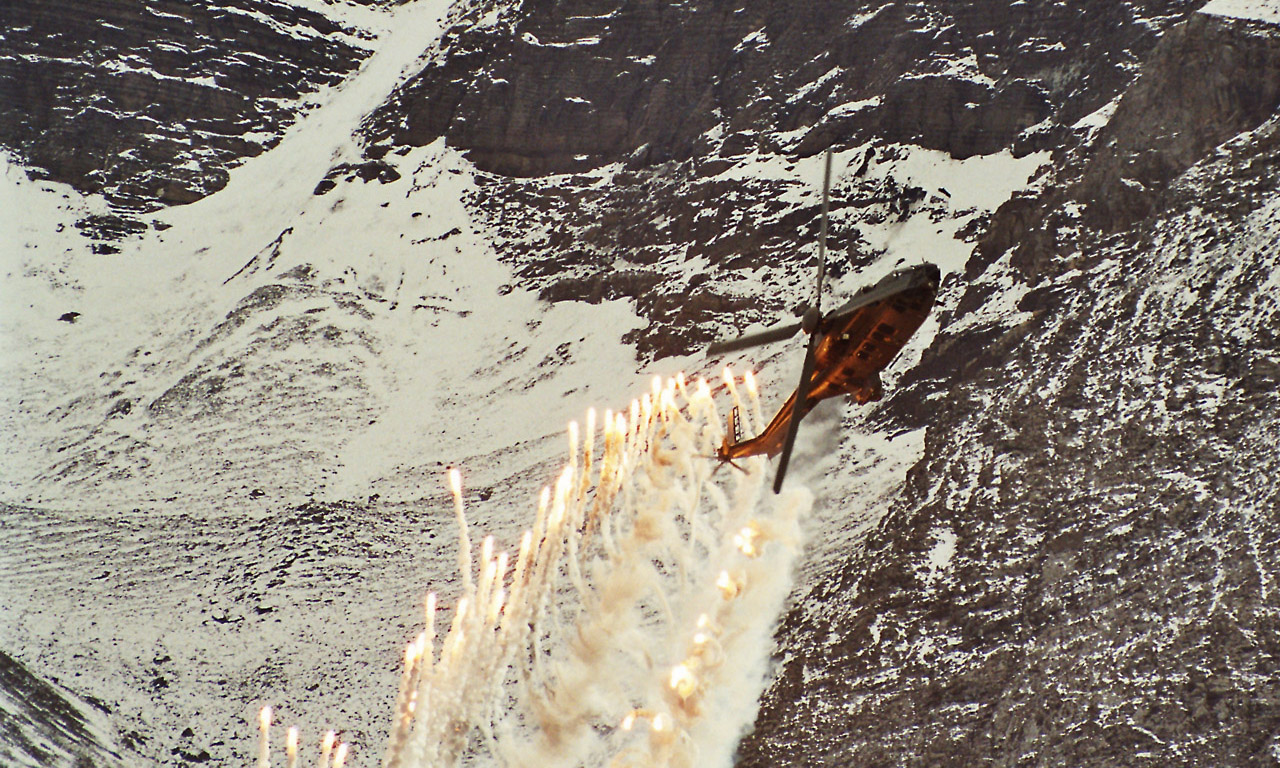
Cougar Helicopter firing decoy flares

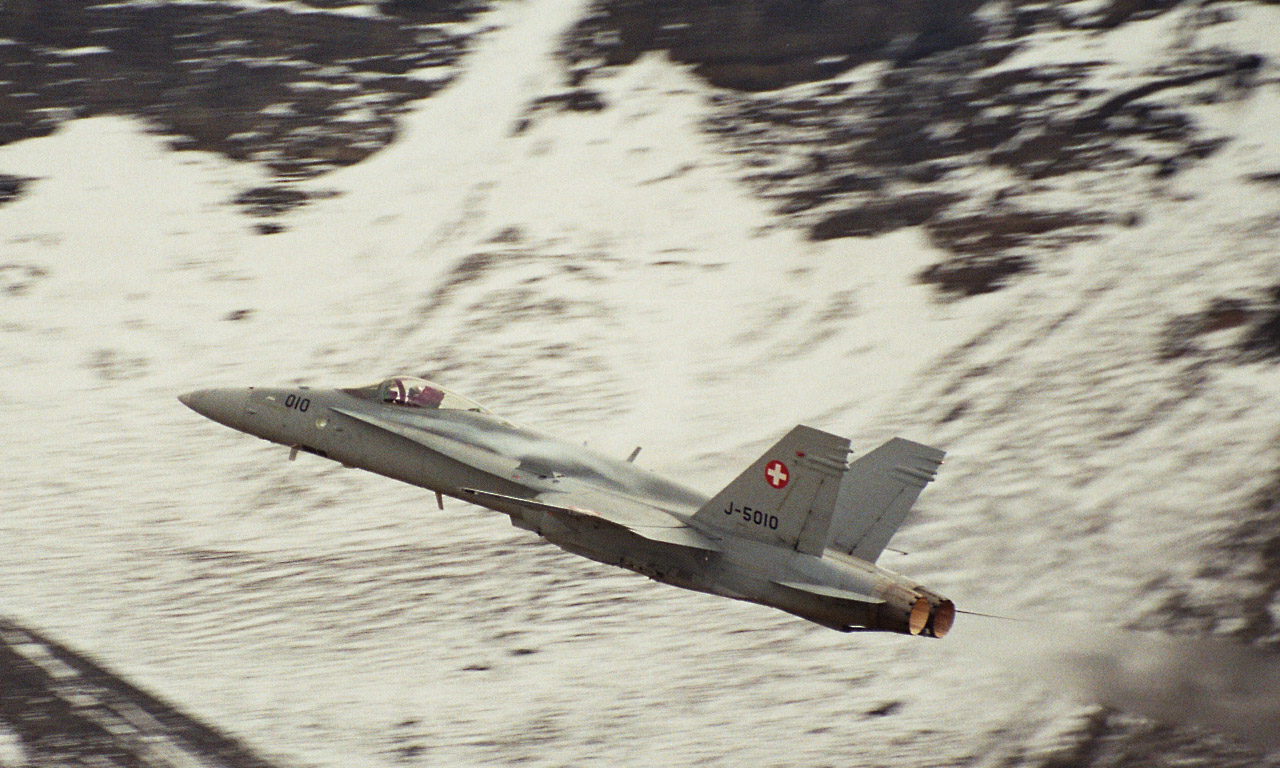
F/A-18C flying over the Swiss Alps

The Swiss Air Force has been traditionally a militia-based service, including its pilots, with an inventory of approximately 456 aircraft whose lengthy service lives (many for more than 30 years) overlapped several eras. However, beginning with its separation from the Army in 1996, the Air Force has been downsizing; it now has a strength of approximately 270 fixed- and rotary-wing aircraft, and is moving towards a smaller, more professional force.

The primary front-line air-defence fleet consists of 30 F/A-18 Hornets (34 aircraft were originally purchased, with three F/A-18D and one F/A-18C lost in crashes) organized into three squadrons (11, 17 and 18) along with 53 F-5 Tiger IIs (98 F-5E and 12 F-5F originally purchased). In October 2008, the Swiss Hornet fleet reached the 50,000 flight hours milestone.

In 2017, the Swiss Hornet fleet reached the 100,000 flight hours milestone as well as 20 years of flight operations.

Previously, the Swiss Air Force did not maintain 24/7 operational readiness status in peacetime, owing to the limited budget and staff available. The Swiss Air Force worked on extending the operational times in 2016, aiming to be maintaining readiness for two armed jet fighters round-the-clock by 2020. On 31 December 2020, the Swiss Air Force gained two operational fighter jets ready to scramble 24/7.

The difficulty of defending Swiss airspace is illustrated by the mountainous character and the small size of the country; the maximum extension of Switzerland is 348 km, a distance that can be flown in a little over 20 minutes by commercial aircraft. Furthermore, Switzerland's policy of neutrality means that they are unlikely to be deployed elsewhere (except for training exercises).

== Intelligence gathering ==
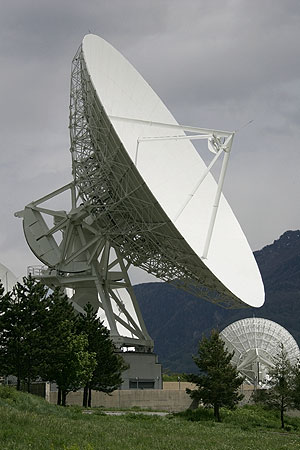
Onyx antennas in Leuk

The Swiss military department maintains the Onyx intelligence gathering system, similar to but much smaller than the international Echelon system.

The Onyx system was launched in 2000 in order to monitor both civil and military communications, such as telephone, fax or Internet traffic carried by satellite. It was completed in late 2005 and currently consists of three interception sites, all based in Switzerland. In a way similar to Echelon, Onyx uses lists of keywords to filter the intercepted content for information of interest.

On 8 January 2006 the Swiss newspaper Sonntagsblick (Sunday edition of the Blick newspaper) published a secret report produced by the Swiss government using data intercepted by Onyx. The report described a fax sent by the Egyptian department of Foreign Affairs to the Egyptian Embassy in London, and described the existence of secret detention facilities (black sites) run by the CIA in Central and Eastern Europe. The Swiss government did not officially confirm the existence of the report, but started a judiciary procedure for leakage of secret documents against the newspaper on 9 January 2006.

== Lakes flotilla ==
The maritime branch of the Army maintains a flotilla of military patrol boats to secure several sizeable lakes that span Switzerland's borders. These boats also serve in a search and rescue role.

During the Second World War, Switzerland fielded the Type 41 class of patrol boats, armed with the 24 mm Type 41 anti-tank rifle—not a personal weapon at 74 kg (163 lb), and later replaced by a 20mm auto-cannon—and machine guns. Nine units were commissioned between 1941-44. These boats were upgraded in 1964, notably receiving radars, radios, and modern armament and were kept in service into the 1980s, the last being decommissioned in late 1983.

The force currently utilize the Aquarius-class (Patrouillenboot 80) riverine patrol boats, which are operated by Motorboat Company 10 of the Corps of Engineers which patrol lakes Geneva, Lucerne, Lugano, Maggiore and Constance.

In June 2019, Finnish shipbuilder Marine Alutech delivered the first four of 14 Patrouillenboot 16, the Patrouillenboot 80's successor, to the flotilla, and these boats's manufacturer designation as Watercat 1250 Patrol; all ships of this class will be named for astronomical objects.

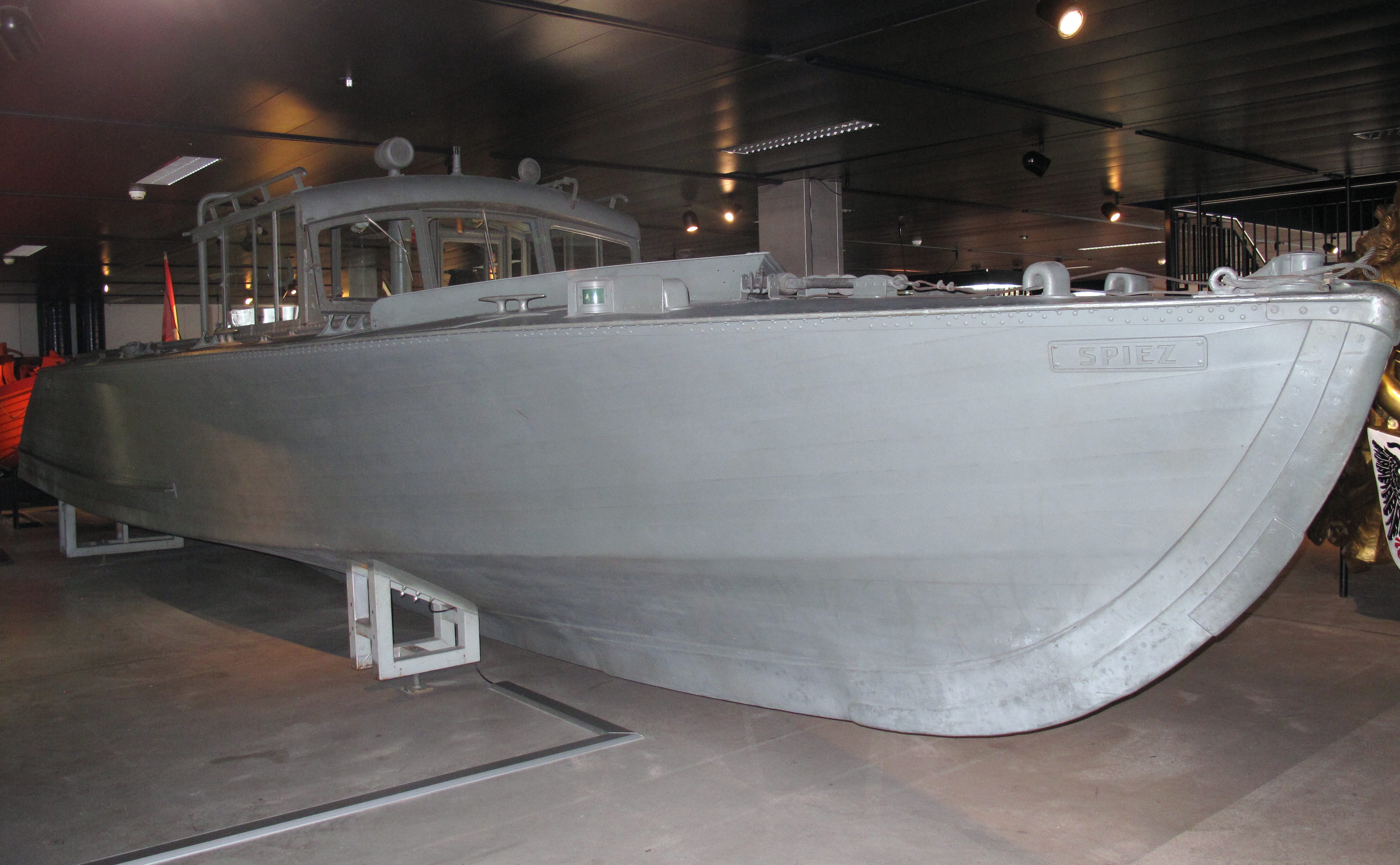
The Spiez, a Type 41 patrol boat, on display at the Swiss Museum of Transport

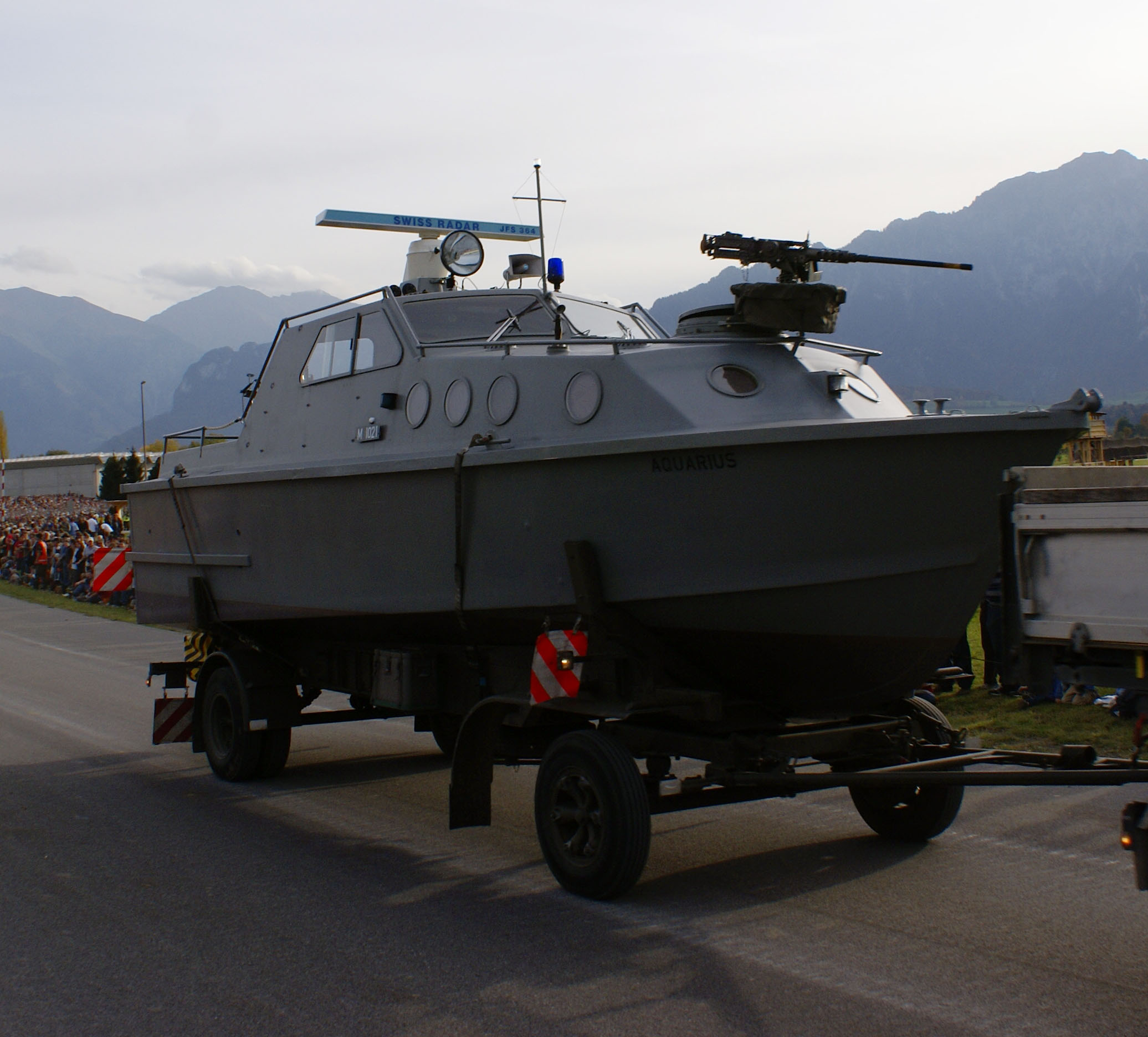
Aquarius-class patrol boat, Type 80

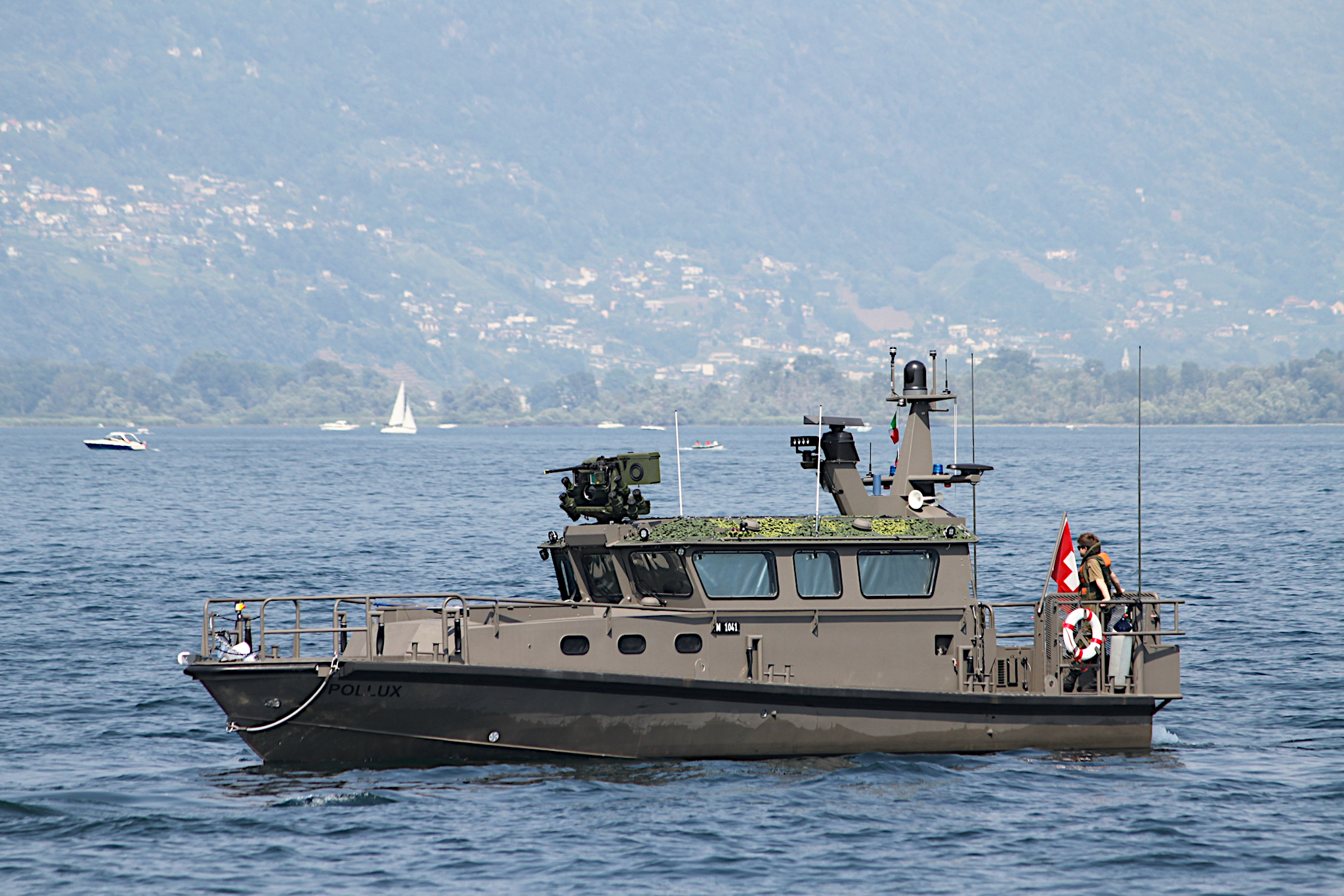
Patrouillenboot 16-class patrol boat.

== Roles ==
The prime role of the Swiss Armed Forces is homeland defence. Switzerland is not part of any multinational war-fighting structure, but selected armed forces members and units do take part in international missions.

=== Military and civil defence ===
After World War II, Switzerland began building homes with 40 cm-thick concrete ceilings that might survive firebombing of the type that destroyed Hamburg and Dresden. In the 1960s, construction began on radiation and blast shelters that could survive one to three bars (100–300 kPa) of pressure from a nuclear explosion. Building codes require blast shelters, which are said to be able to accommodate 114% of the Swiss population. Small towns have large underground parking garages that can serve as sealed community shelters. There are also hospitals and command centres in such shelters, aimed at keeping the country running in case of emergencies. Every family or rental agency has to pay a replacement tax to support these shelters, or alternatively own a personal shelter in their place of residence; many private shelters serve as wine cellars and closets.

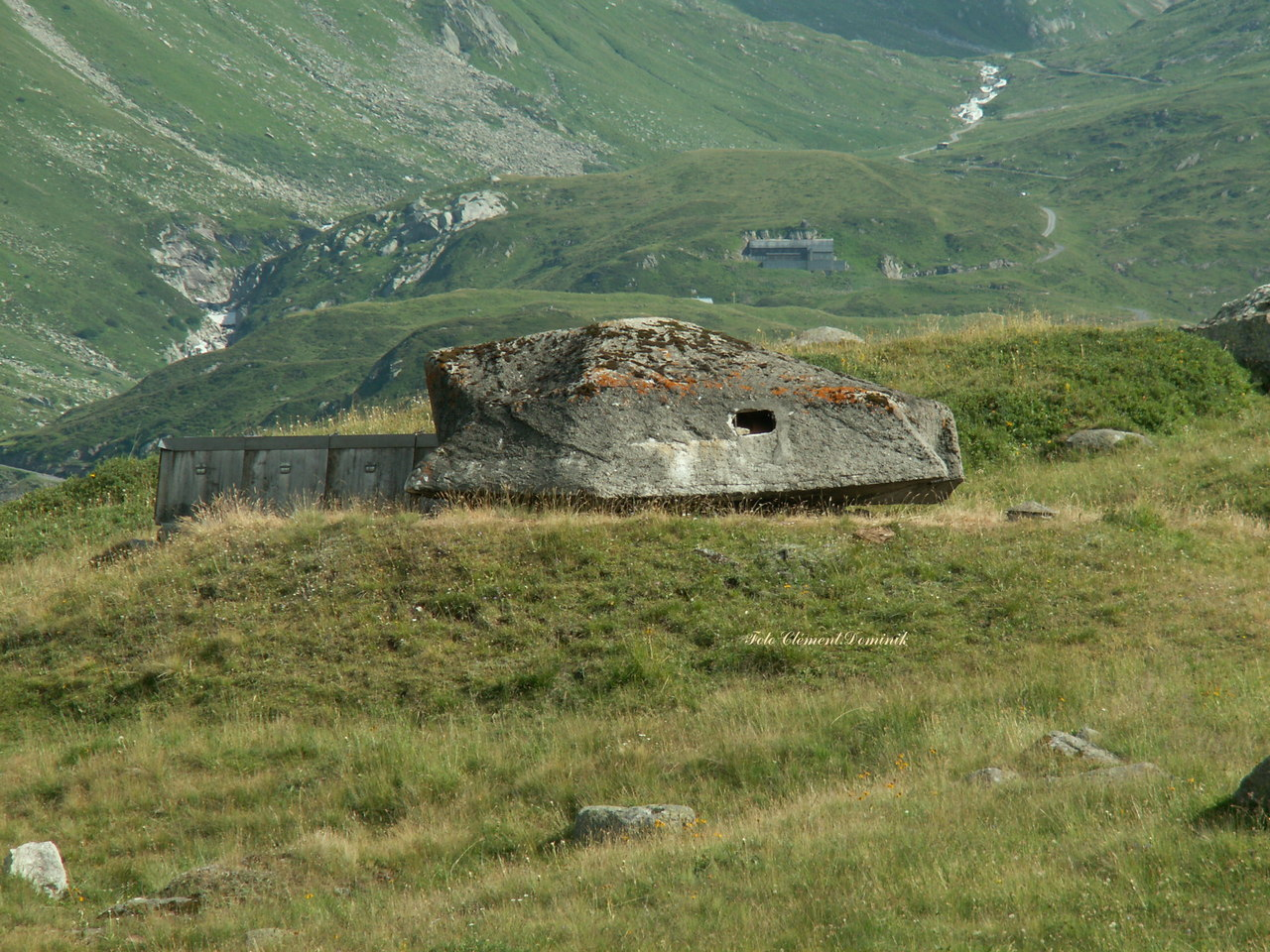
Camouflaged cannons and fortifications near Furka Pass in the Gotthard region

Thousands of tunnels, highways, railroads, and bridges are built with tank traps and primed with demolition charges to be used against invading forces; often, the civilian engineer who designed the bridge also plans the demolition as a military officer. Hidden guns are aimed to prevent enemy forces from attempting to rebuild. Permanent fortifications were established in the Alps, as bases from which to retake the fertile valleys after a potential invasion. They include underground air bases that are adjacent to normal runways; the aircraft, crew and supporting material are housed in the caverns.

However, a significant part of these fortifications was dismantled between the 1980s and during the "Army 95" reformation. The most important fortifications are located at Saint-Maurice, Gotthard Pass area and Sargans. The fortification on the west side of the Rhône at Saint-Maurice has not been used by the army since the beginning of the 1990s. The east side (Savatan) is still in use.

During the Cold War the military expected that any invasion would likely come from the northeast, as the Soviet Union associated the country with NATO despite its stated neutrality. The Swiss government thought that the aim of an invasion would be to control the economically important transport routes through the Swiss Alps, namely the Gotthard, the Simplon and Great St. Bernard passes, because Switzerland does not possess any significant natural resources.

=== Peacekeeping overseas ===
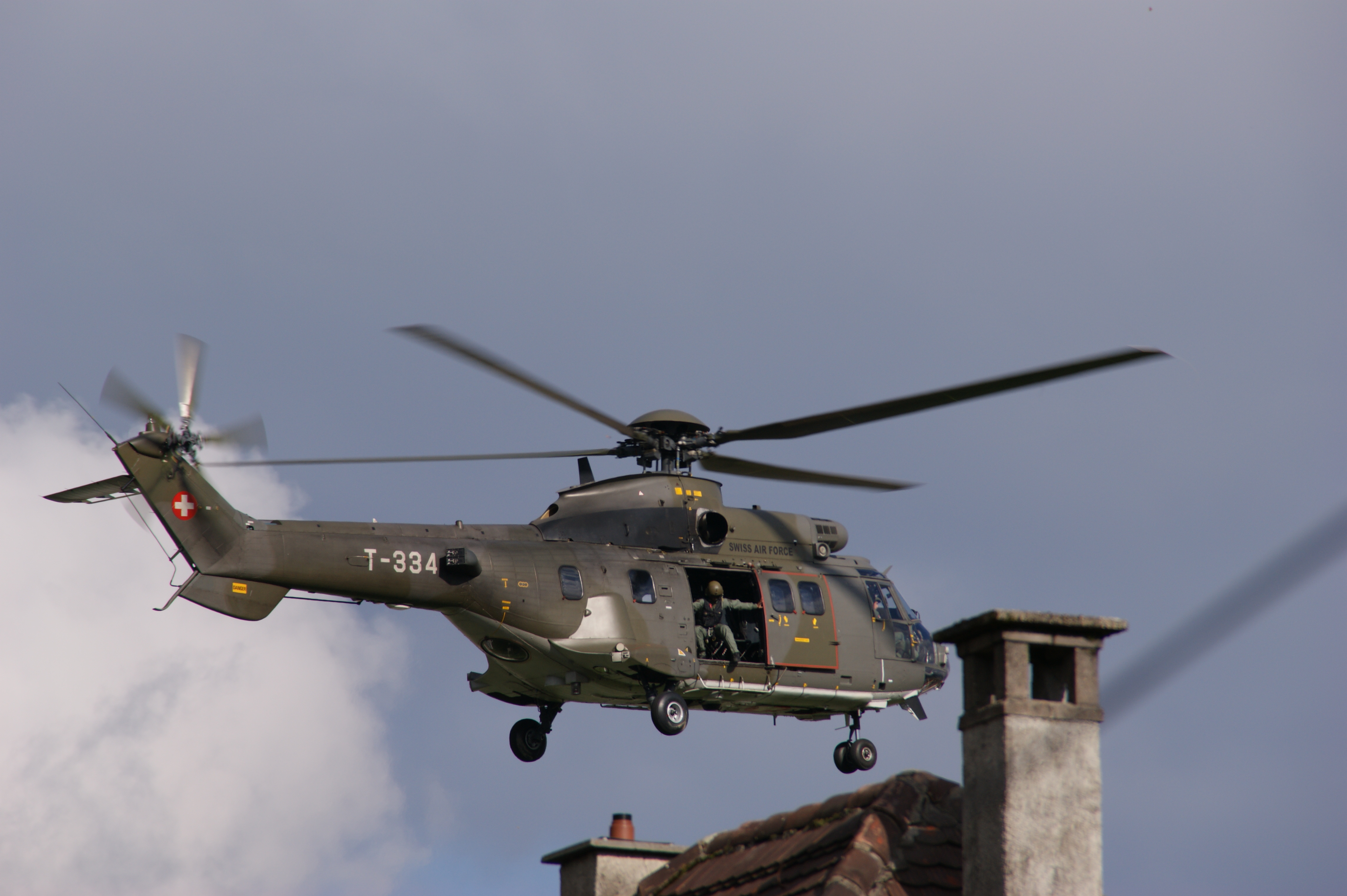
Cougar AS532 T-334 during a Swiss Air Force rescue exercise

Operating from a neutral country, Switzerland's Armed Forces do not take part in armed conflicts in other countries. However, over the years, the Swiss Armed Forces have been part of several peacekeeping missions around the world.

From 1996 to 2001, the Swiss Armed Forces were present in Bosnia and Herzegovina with headquarters in Sarajevo. Their mission, as part of the Swiss Peacekeeping Missions, was to provide logistic and medical support to the Organization for Security and Co-operation in Europe (OSCE), protection duties and humanitarian demining. The mission was named SHQSU, standing for Swiss Headquarters Support Unit to BiH. It was composed of 50 to 55 elite Swiss soldiers under contract for six to 12 months. None of the active soldiers were armed during the duration of the mission. The Swiss soldiers were recognised among the other armies present on the field by their distinctive yellow beret. The SHQSU is not the same as the more publicized Swisscoy, which is the Swiss Army Mission to Kosovo.

In its first military deployment since 1815, Switzerland deployed 31 soldiers to Afghanistan in 2003, and two Swiss officers had worked with German troops. Swiss forces were withdrawn in February 2008.

Switzerland is part of the Neutral Nations Supervisory Commission (NNSC), which was created to monitor the armistice between North and South Korea. Since the responsibilities of the NNSC have been much reduced over the past few years, only five people are still part of the Swiss delegation, which is located near the Korean DMZ.

== Logos ==
Old logo

Quadrilingual logo until 2023

Quadrilingual logo since 2023

German-language logo since 2023

French-language logo since 2023

Italian-language logo since 2023

== See also ==
- Military ranks of the Swiss Armed Forces
- Swiss Guard
- National Redoubt (Switzerland)
- Militia System
- Civil protection in Switzerland

== Bibliography ==
- John McPhee, La Place de la Concorde Suisse, New York: Noonday Press (Farrar, Straus & Giroux), 1984.
- Field Army Corps 1, Sécurité au seuil du XXIe siècle: Histoire et vie du Corps d'Armée de Campagne 1, c.2000. ISBN 2-9700264-0-6.
- MILVOC, German-English Dictionary of military terms from the Swiss Armed Forces
