= The Irish Famine (book) =

1999 book by Diarmaid Ferriter and Colm Tóibín

- First edition cover
- Author: Colm Tóibín and Diarmaid Ferriter
- Language: English
- Genre: Novel
- Publisher: Profile Books Limited
- Publication date: 3 May 2001
- Publication place: Ireland
- Media type: Print (Hardback & Paperback)
- Pages: 220 pp (first edition, hardback)
- ISBN: 9781861972491
- OCLC: 46432991
- Dewey Decimal: 941.508 21
- LC Class: DA950.7 .I74 2001

The Irish Famine is a book written by Diarmaid Ferriter and Colm Tóibín. The book is in two volumes, the first of which was written and originally published by Tóibín in 1999. The second volume, written by Ferriter, is entitled The Capricious Growth of a Single Root and was added in 2001.

== Volume One ==
The first volume of The Irish Famine discusses how the Irish (writers, historians, government officials) have approached the task of describing and creating accounts of the Great Famine. Tóibín wrote his volume in part, for Irish-Americans; he has been critical of how the Great Famine has been taught in American schools. He mentions that Americans are "full of emotional language, selective quotation and vicious anti-English rhetoric" and that "[Americans] assert, despite all evidence to the contrary, that Ireland remained a net exporter of food during the Famine."

== Volume Two ==
The second volume of The Irish Famine is a selection of primary source documents chosen by Ferriter that pertain to the Famine and its history. Documents include: British Parliamentary Papers; Distress papers from the National Archives of Ireland; Relief Commission Papers; Society of Friends Famine Papers; reports from various Relief Committees; the Prendergast family letters; statistics from the Office of Public Works during 1845–1850; reports from County Inspection Officers; personal statements by leading religious officials; reports from the Irish Constabulary; and personal correspondence of Richard Dowden, the former Mayor of Cork, the Lord Lieutenant, the Duke of Leinster, Lord Cloncurry, Robert Peel, Charles Trevelyan, and John Russell, among others.

== Critical response ==
Reviews of Ferriter's volume have been positive; America called the primary sources that Ferriter collected "fascinating and revealing." Ferriter himself, however, has said that "These documents...do nothing to settle the [Famine] argument; instead, they establish its terms and complexity." The Irish Famine, as a whole, has been well-received also; Read Ireland reviewed it as a "unique book [that] opens a door to a new and deeper understanding of the Great Irish Famine."
