= 2013 Irish constitutional referendums =

Two constitutional referendums were held simultaneously in Ireland on 4 October 2013. The Thirty-second Amendment of the Constitution Bill 2013 proposed abolishing the Seanad, the upper house of the Oireachtas, and was rejected despite opinion polls to the contrary, while the Thirty-third Amendment of the Constitution Bill 2013 proposed the establishment of a Court of Appeal to sit between the High Court and the Supreme Court, taking over the existing appellate jurisdiction of the Supreme Court, and was approved by voters.

== Campaign ==
Governing coalition members Fine Gael and Labour Party supported abolishing the Seanad citing a 20 million euros reduction in spending and fewer politicians, meanwhile Fianna Fáil opposed the proposal on the grounds that voters should "demand real reform". Democracy Matters opposed the measure citing it as a power grab; more specifically, they referenced the biggest majority for a government coalition ever. It also pointed to five reasons to vote no: real reform, accountability, revive the economy, defend the constitution of Ireland and protecting rights. Sinn Féin also supported the motion.

Taoiseach Enda Kenny said the abolition would result in a leaner, more effective and more accountable system of government. Due to representation for large number of religious minorities (Protestants) in the first few Senate sessions, it has been a voice of Northern Ireland in introducing their perspective to national government. At the time, there were a large number of Protestant representative for the Roman Catholic majority. As such former senators Seamus Mallon (former Social Democratic and Labour Party MLA), Maurice Hayes (former Northern Ireland Ombudsman) and John Robb opposed the measure of abolition. Robb said that the abolition could "exclude the possibility of northern input into southern politics. I think it is very important to sustain that link, and it will not be sustained at political level, except by party politics blowing across the so-called border;" Mallon added that representation of six-county Northern Ireland was "very valuable" but that it should be from a "broader base. If you're simply going to have input from people in the mainstream party politics then it defeats its own purpose. There has been a huge reluctance on unionists to take nominations to the senate, that's a fact of life." Hayes added: It (the Seanad) might not have stopped a bill but it has certainly improved a lot of bills. [While it is] hard to defend the senate in its present form, [something is needed to] keep a curb [on government ministers]. The Dáil is dominated by whichever government is in power, and there's no check on them really at all." He cited the dismissal of TD Lucinda Creighton from her ministerial post the same year for voting against party policy on the Protection of Life During Pregnancy Act 2013 as evidence of suppressing independent opinions by the whip system. As such, he also noted that as a senator he had voted against Bertie Ahern, even though Ahern nominated him. Mallon said similarly that he "didn't go to the senate to take up a party whip. John Robb and myself are very clear about this, we went there as independents, we spoke as independents and we voted as independents. [The Seanad offered] a new layer of both academic and technical and political expertise. [It needs more people] from different walks of life." Yet, he conceded that "I'm afraid it will be passed and I'm afraid the Seanad will become a historical memory."

Green Party MEP Patricia McKenna supported Democracy Matters' campaign saying that there was a lack of balance in the campaign with a disproportionate amount of funding for the advocates on the government side but that the Referendum Commission was doing its best to inform voters but was limited as it could not advocate for either side.

"A Yes vote will block any possibility for the Seanad to be reformed into an effective checks and balance mechanism that might protect the rights of interest groups and citizens across the board. With Ireland currently under massive financial obligations to the IMF and the EU/ECB, this is not the time to dismantle our current constitutional structure. There was never a time in our history when we needed scrutiny and accountability more than now and it beggars belief that most political parties are willing to support a decision which will allow for the easier passage of controversial legislation most of which emanates from the EU. Compared to Scandinavian courtiers, Germany and many of the new member states, Ireland’s has one of the least effective scrutiny systems of EU legislation within the EU. A reformed Seanad could provide real potential to correct this weakness in Ireland’s oversight of EU policy making."

== Results ==
=== Abolition of the Seanad ===
Thirty-second Amendment of the Constitution Bill 2013
Choice	Votes	%
For	591,937	48.27
Against	634,437	51.73
Total	1,226,374	100.00
Valid votes	1,226,374	98.84
Invalid/blank votes	14,355	1.16
Total votes	1,240,729	100.00
Registered voters/turnout	3,167,484	39.17

==== Reactions ====
Kenny's reaction included that he was "personally disappointed" but that "sometimes in politics you get a wallop in the electoral process. I accept the verdict of the people...It is not about parties, it is not about leaders, it is not about government because there wasn't a government campaign here. It was the people's day and the people's decision and that's the people's absolute right and I think from that point of view this is the ultimate exercise in democracy."

=== Establishment of a Court of Appeal ===
Thirty-third Amendment of the Constitution Bill 2013
Choice	Votes	%
For	795,008	65.16
Against	425,047	34.84
Total	1,220,055	100.00
Valid votes	1,581,998	98.75
Invalid/blank votes	20,080	1.25
Total votes	1,602,078	100.00
Registered voters/turnout	3,167,484	50.58

== See also ==
- Constitutional amendment
- Politics of the Republic of Ireland
