= Type 41 class patrol boat =

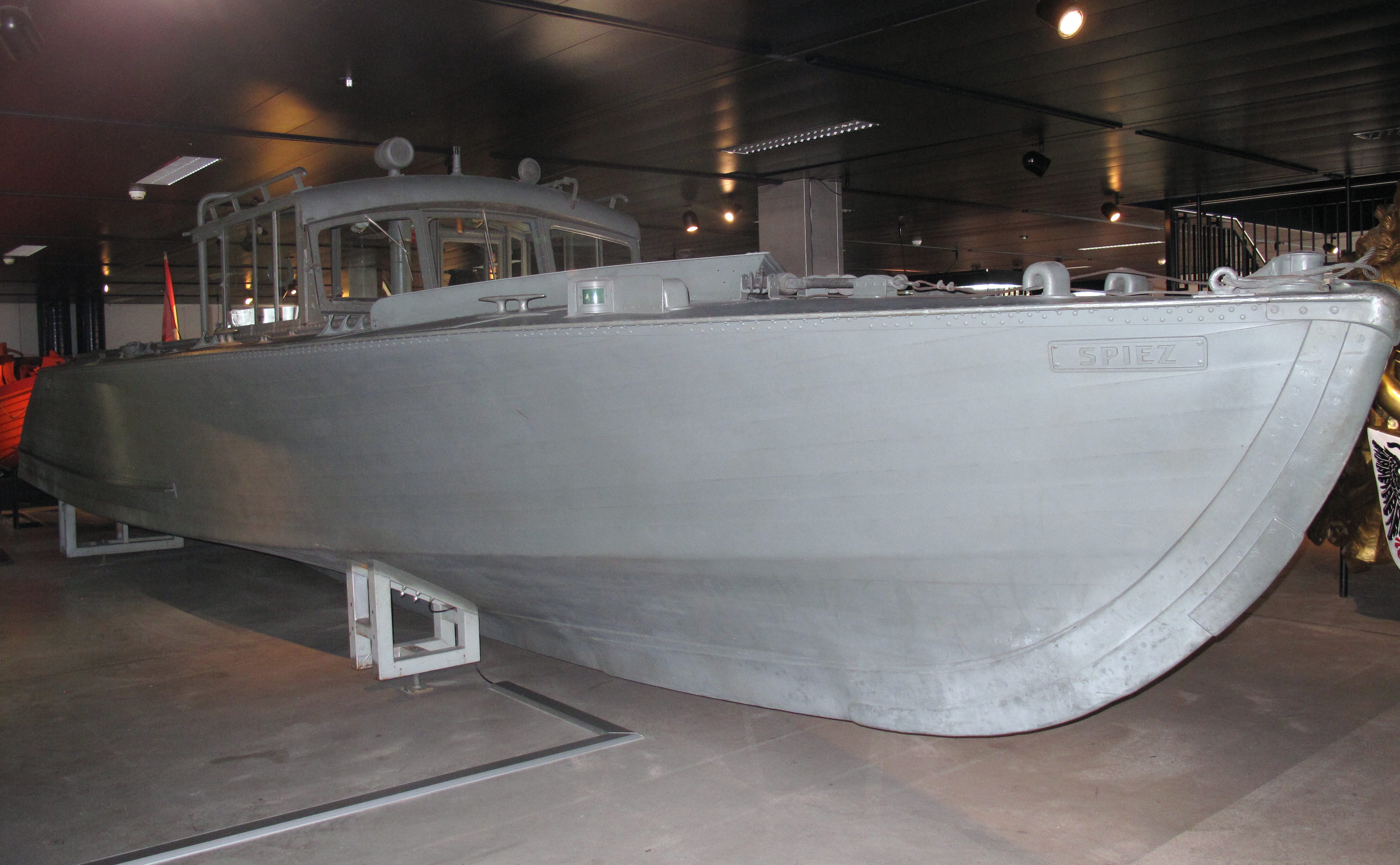
- Spiez on display in the permanent exhibit of the Swiss Museum of Transport in Lucerne.

Class overview
- Name: Type 41
- Builders: Werner Risch AG, Zürich-Wolishofen
- Operators: Switzerland Navy
- Succeeded by: Type 80 class patrol boat
- In service: 1944-1983
- Completed: 9

General characteristics
- Type: Patrol boat
- Tonnage: 7 tonnes
- Length: 12 m (39 ft)
- Beam: 3.3 m (11 ft)
- Draught: 1 m (3 ft 3 in)
- Propulsion: Modified Hispano aircraft engine, V8 type HS 57
- Speed: 41 km/h (22 kn)
- Complement: 7 men (commander, helmsman, engineer, two bow gunners and two stern gunners
- Armament: Before 1962: Type 41 anti-tank gun; Twin anti-air guns; After 1962: 20mm auto-cannon; MG 51 machine gun.

The Type 41 Class was a type of patrol boats of the Military of Switzerland, commissioned during the Second World War to patrol the border lakes of Switzerland. The class comprised nine units, commissioned between 1941 and 1944 in three series: Thun and Brienz in December 1941, Sargans, Schwyz and Unterwalden in July 1943, and Spiez, Bönigen and Brunnen in April 1944; Furthermore, the prototype Uri was also commissioned. They remained in service until late 1983, when they were replaced by the more modern Type 80 (Aquarius class). In 1962, the units of the class were upgraded with an electric generator, radars and radios, and had their armament upgraded: the 24 mm Type 41 anti-tank rifle—not a personal weapon at 74 kg (163 lb)—at the bow was replaced by a 20mm autocannon, and the twin anti-air MG 38 machine guns at the stern were replaced by an MG 51 machine gun.

When not on active duty in the military, the units were operated by the border patrol of the Customs office.

- Thun

Builder: Werner Risch AG, Zürich-Wolishofen
Begun:
Launched: 1941
Completed:
Fate:

- Brienz

Builder: Werner Risch AG, Zürich-Wolishofen
Begun:
Launched: 1941
Completed:
Fate:

- Sargans

Builder: Werner Risch AG, Zürich-Wolishofen
Begun:
Launched: 1943
Completed:
Fate:

- Schwyz

Builder: Werner Risch AG, Zürich-Wolishofen
Begun:
Launched: 1943
Completed:
Fate:

- Unterwalden

Builder: Werner Risch AG, Zürich-Wolishofen
Begun:
Launched: 1943
Completed:
Fate:

- Spiez

Builder: Werner Risch AG, Zürich-Wolishofen
Begun:
Launched: 1944
Completed:
Fate: On display in the permanent exhibit of the Swiss Museum of Transport in Lucerne.

- Bönigen

Builder: Werner Risch AG, Zürich-Wolishofen
Begun:
Launched: 1944
Completed:
Fate:

- Brunnen

Builder: Werner Risch AG, Zürich-Wolishofen
Begun:
Launched: 1944
Completed:
Fate:

== Sources and references ==
=== Sources ===
- Information label at the Swiss Museum of Transport.
- History, pbooturi.ch
- Photographs, pbooturi.ch
