= Thirty-second Amendment of the Constitution Bill 2013 =

Proposal to abolish the Seanad, the upper house of the Oireachtas

- 4 October 2013
- Abolition of the Seanad

Results
Choice	Votes	%
Yes	591,937	48.27%
No	634,437	51.73%
Valid votes	1,226,374	98.84%
Invalid or blank votes	14,355	1.16%
Total votes	1,240,729	100.00%
Registered voters/turnout	3,167,484	39.17%
- Results by constituencies

The Thirty-second Amendment of the Constitution (Abolition of Seanad Éireann) Bill 2013 was a proposal to amend the Constitution of Ireland to abolish Seanad Éireann, the upper house of the Irish parliament, the Oireachtas. The proposal was rejected by the electorate in a referendum on 4 October 2013 by 51.7% voting against to 48.3% in favour.

The bill completed its passage through the Houses of the Oireachtas on 23 July 2013. Had it been approved, the Seanad would have ceased to exist after the following Irish general election, leaving Dáil Éireann as the sole house of the Oireachtas.

Because the Thirty-third Amendment was passed on the same day, there is no "Thirty-second Amendment".

== Background ==
The Seanad is a much weaker chamber than the Dáil. The government usually has a majority in the Seanad, which has not rejected a bill passed by the Dáil since 1964. Debate on the Seanad's future has focused on whether it would be better to reform it (with or without constitutional amendment) or to abolish it altogether. In October 2009, Fine Gael leader Enda Kenny stated that it was his intention that a Fine Gael government would abolish the Seanad, and along with reducing the number of TDs by 20, it would "save an estimated €150m over the term of a Dáil." This contrasted with a speech he had made in July 2009 arguing for reform rather than abolition of the Seanad. In August 2013, a pro-Seanad advocate alleged that Kenny's change was spurred by a "secret report" from party advisers; Fine Gael responded that the document in question had been published in March 2010.

In the 2011 election campaign, Labour and Sinn Féin also promised to abolish the Seanad, while Fianna Fáil supported a referendum on the issue. The programme of the Fine Gael–Labour coalition, which came to power at the election, promised to abolish the Seanad as part of a broader programme of constitutional reform.

== Bill ==
Fine Gael's 2011 election manifesto pledged to have a referendum to abolish the Seanad within 12 months of taking office; as Taoiseach in 2012, Enda Kenny attributed the delay in introducing the bill to the complexity of the changes required. The bill as introduced makes 40 changes to the text of the Constitution. As well as deleting references to the Seanad, the amendment had to insert transitional provisions to explicitly abolish it. These were required to allow for the delay between the time the amendment became law, expected to be autumn 2013, and the time the abolition was to take effect at the next election, which might not have been until 2016.

The bill was discussed at cabinet in early May 2013, and on 5 June approved by cabinet, though minister Joan Burton said they had not reviewed the bill in detail. The bill was published that evening at a press conference at which Kenny and Tánaiste Eamon Gilmore both spoke. The government also promised changes to the structure of Oireachtas committees and standing orders for discussing bills, additional to those necessitated by Seanad abolition.

The bill's second reading in the Dáil began on 13 June 2013, and it passed all stages there on 25 June. The Dáil then passed a resolution on the wording of the ballot paper question. The bill was introduced in the Seanad the next day, and passed its final stage there on 23 July, by 33 votes to 25. Two Senators nominated by the Taoiseach voted against the bill, while the two Fine Gael Senators who had lost the whip the previous week for opposing the government's Protection of Life During Pregnancy Bill 2013 voted with the government.

=== Proposed changes ===
If the bill had become law, it would have immediately inserted a new transitional Article 19A into the Constitution. Article 19A provided that on the day before the first sitting of the new Dáil after the next general election, a range of other changes to the Constitution would have been triggered. These are listed in three separate schedules to the bill.

Bill (Note: Number of section and schedule within the amendment bill)	Articles (Note: Number of affected article or section of article within Constitution; inserted / changed / ~~deleted~~)	Duration	Substance	Date of effect
1	19A	Transitional	Sets the trigger for the later changes.	Date of enactment
2	15.1.2°	Permanent	Defines the Oireachtas to consist of the President and the Dáil.	Day before new Dáil meets
3	12–15; ~~18–21~~; 22; ~~23–24~~; 25–26; ~~27~~; 28–29; 31, 33, 35, 40, 46–47, ~~53~~, ~~55~~	Permanent	The deletion of Articles which provide for the election and appointment of members to the Seanad, its powers, procedures for resolving disagreements between the two houses, and consequential changes	Day before new Dáil meets
4	50A	Transitional	Business in progress in the bicameral Oireachtas at the time of its dissolution will lapse, but may be revived by the Dáil afterwards; business complete except for action by the President will not lapse.	Day before new Dáil meets

The two transitional articles would not have been printed in official versions of the Constitution after the date of abolition; this emulates the handling of the 1937 transitional articles by which the current Irish state succeeded the Irish Free State.

==== Consequential changes ====
Articles and sections which describe the Seanad or the relationship between the two Houses would have been deleted; later sections of an Article would have been renumbered to fill the gaps of deleted sections, but later Articles would not have been renumbered. Articles 53 and 55 are spent transitory provisions from the Oireachtas of the Irish Free State, removed since they related to the post-1937 Seanad.

Many other consequential changes involved the replacement of "[either/both] House[s] of the Oireachtas" with "Dáil Éireann". Some changes were less mechanical:

- Nomination of a Presidential election candidate would have required 14 rather than 20 Oireachtas members. This reflected the reduction in the number of Oireachtas members from 226 (60 Senators plus 166 TDs) to 158 (all TDs, whose number is to be reduced by a separate Act).
- Impeachment of a President would have required an absolute majority of four-fifths of the Dáil rather than of two-thirds of each house.
- Removal of a High or Supreme Court judge, or the Comptroller and Auditor General would have required an absolute majority of two-thirds of the Dáil instead of a simple majority of both houses. The Constitution does not mention the lower courts, but their judges' tenure is the same under statute law and so would have changed likewise.
- The Leas-Cheann Comhairle of the Dáil would have replaced the Cathaoirleach of the Seanad on the Presidential Commission and the Council of State. A further two TDs would have been nominated as substitutes for the Ceann Comhairle and Leas-Cheann Comhairle in the event that the Ceann Comhairle or Leas-Cheann Comhairle were unavailable.
- The Ceann Comhairle's opinion on whether a bill is a money bill would have been definitive unless the Dáil resolved otherwise. The only remaining significance of money bills would have been that they couldn't have been referred to the Supreme Court by the President under Article 26. At present the designation also limits the Seanad's power to oppose such bills; and if the Seanad disagrees with the Ceann Comhairle's designation, the question may be referred by the President to a committee of privileges chaired by a judge.
- A request for the President to sign a bill urgently would have required the concurrence of the Dáil rather than the Seanad.
- The ordinary referendum would have been abolished. At present such a referendum can only be called if a bill is rejected by the Seanad.

== Positions in the debate ==
=== Pro-abolition ===
Arguments in favour of the bill included: that abolition would save money; that the number of legislators is too large relative to the state's population; that the method of selection is elitist and undemocratic; and that the Seanad is a powerless rubber-stamp. In an opinion poll for The Irish Times the week before the referendum, the reasons given by prospective yes-voters were: cost (43%), lack of power (16%), superfluity (14%), to reduce the number of politicians (8%) and lack of democratic election (5%).

Abolition was supported by Fine Gael, Labour, Sinn Féin, and the Socialist Party. Although Sinn Féin opposed the bill in the Oireachtas and argued that the Seanad's future should be discussed by the Constitutional Convention, it announced in late July that it was supporting abolition as the Seanad was "elite and out of touch".

A non-party pro-abolition group called "One House" launched its campaign on 2 September 2013. Opponents alleged that the participation of its head, Kieran Mulvey, compromised his professional position as chairman of the Labour Relations Commission.

Desmond O'Malley, founder of the Progressive Democrats, called for Seanad abolition and additional political reform.

The Fine Gael campaign claimed that the annual net saving to taxpayers of abolishing the Seanad would be €20m, a figure disputed by opponents. The Referendum Commission wrote to the Oireachtas finance officer, who put the annual cost of the Seanad at €8.8m in pay and expenses for Senators and their personal staff; €9.3m in support and infrastructure; and €2m in pensions. The officer said that it was not possible to estimate how much of this cost would be saved by abolishing the Seanad.

=== Anti-abolition ===
Arguments opposing the bill included: that a No-vote will create a mandate for reform of the Seanad; that the process of legislation needs greater scrutiny; that most Westminster system countries have bicameral legislatures; and that the Irish financial crisis shows a need for more governance. In an opinion poll for The Irish Times the week before the referendum, the reasons given by prospective no-voters were: as a check on the government (54%), because they disliked the government (20%), and because they did not believe there would be significant cost savings (6% (Note: 4% "didn’t believe the alleged savings"; 2% "the savings were not significant")).

Fianna Fáil stated that it opposed abolition and instead supported reform of the Seanad. The Green Party opposed abolition as concentrating power in a "smaller political circle". On 25 September 2013 the Reform Alliance, of Oireachtas members expelled from Fine Gael for opposing the Protection of Life During Pregnancy Act 2013, called for a No-vote. The Workers' Party characterised the bill as "a power grab by the kitchen cabinet within the cabinet".

Independent members of the Seanad were opposed to its abolition. In 2012, Michael McDowell, Joe O'Toole, Noel Whelan, Feargal Quinn and Katherine Zappone published a 30-page blueprint for reform of the Seanad, with the slogan "Open it, don't close it", which was discussed in the Seanad. They formed the "Seanad Reform Group", which in May 2013 became "Democracy Matters", to lobby against abolition. In 2013, two groups of Senators and one group of TDs each introduced a separate bill proposing to reform the Seanad by replacing the restricted-franchise Vocational panel elections with general-franchise elections. Several former Taoiseach-nominated senators from Northern Ireland endorsed the opportunity the Seanad provided for cross-border input to the state's politics.

Several TDs from the governing Labour Party, including its chief whip Emmet Stagg, said that they would vote against abolition in the referendum, while supporting the bill in the Oireachtas. The national students' union, Union of Students in Ireland campaigned for a no vote.

Commentators including Vincent Browne suggested that Enda Kenny's 2009 announcement of his intention to abolish the Seanad was a U-turn from his position of several months earlier, and an impulsive publicity stunt announced without consulting any party colleagues.

Breda O'Brien suggested voters should tick the "No" box on the ballot and also write the word "Reform" on it; a suggestion endorsed by Fintan O'Toole despite the risk of thereby spoiling the ballot. Both columnists characterised the government's putative reform of Dáil procedures as a charade to disguise a migration of power from the legislature to the cabinet and the Economic Management Council.

== Course of the referendum campaign ==
The Referendum Commission was established by the Minister for the Environment, Community and Local Government on 6 June 2012, with High Court judge Elizabeth Dunne as chair. While such a Commission was required by law to supervise any referendum, previous Commissions had not been established prior to the successful passage through the Oireachtas of the relevant amendment bill. The earlier establishment in this case was in response to complaints that previous referendum campaigns had been too short to enable the electorate to form a considered opinion.

A small team of officials from the Department of the Taoiseach assisted the government's campaign to have the bill passed. In the event of the bill's receiving majority approval in the referendum, this team would have remained in place to plan consequent changes to statute law to remove from it all references to the Seanad. These changes would have needed to be in place before a new Dáil met following the next general election.

After the bill was passed by the Seanad on 23 July 2013, a tweet from Fine Gael stated that the date of the referendum would be 4 October. There was criticism of the manner of the announcement, and the government denied later that evening that a formal decision on the date had been made. The next day, the Local Government Minister Phil Hogan made the necessary order establishing 4 October as the date for the referendum on the Seanad bill, and for a separate referendum on another Constitutional amendment to establish a Court of Appeal.

The Fine Gael "yes" vote campaign was headed by minister Richard Bruton, assisted by first-term TD Regina Doherty, who described the Seanad as "shockingly undemocratic" at the press conference launching the campaign. David Norris stated in the Seanad, "I object in the strongest possible way to the idea that someone who has spent years in the House should have to listen to the Regina monologue from someone who has not been a wet weekend in the Oireachtas and is talking through her fanny." He later withdrew the remarks, calling them "intemperate".

The referendum commission's dedicated website was launched on 5 September 2013.

The Seanad was recalled early from its summer recess on 20 August 2013, after a petition by Senator Mark Daly of Fianna Fáil secured the support of the necessary twenty senators. The recall was to discuss annulling a 2012 statutory instrument implementing a 2010 EU directive on organ donation. The rarely used power of annulment requires resolutions by both Houses. A petition to recall the Dáil was unsuccessful, and Fine Gael accused Daly of an expensive and ineffectual publicity stunt relating to the Seanad abolition campaign.

Some government members suggested that if the abolition amendment were to be rejected at the referendum, then the government would consider proposals for reform of the Seanad instead. Others pointed out that reform was not an option listed on the ballot paper. On 20 September, when Micheál Martin asked in leader's questions whether the Taoiseach would reform the Seanad if the referendum were defeated, his response was, "Deputy Martin will not walk me down that avenue." On 23 September, Richard Bruton said there were no plans to reform the Seanad if the referendum were defeated.

In the Dáil on 24 September, Martin questioned the role of civil servants in the referendum campaign, and invited Kenny to a public debate on the question of abolition. RTÉ offered to stage a debate on Prime Time on 1 October 2013, three days before the referendum. While Kenny decided not to take part, Richard Bruton agreed to participate. The debate was moderated by Miriam O'Callaghan.

The Sunday Independent on 29 September reported that Fine Gael had been limiting media access to Enda Kenny, and had singled out high-profile Independent senators Feargal Quinn and John Crown to criticise their attendance.

Harry McGee of The Irish Times suggested that voter turnout would be low, with middle-class graduates with a vote in the Seanad university constituencies more likely both to vote and to vote No, and that Sinn Féin's campaign could be crucial for the Yes side.

== Opinion polls ==
Some opinion polls asked specifically how respondents would vote in the referendum on the 2013 bill; others asked a more general question on whether respondents felt the Seanad should be abolished, "reformed", or retained unchanged. This includes polls taken after the programme for government in 2011 which announced the plan to abolish the Seanad, but before the bill to effect this was published in 2013.

Referendum
Date	Source	Polling agency	Sample size	Yes	No	Undecided	Ref
27–28 September 2013	The Irish Times	Ipsos MRBI	1,000	44%	27%	29% (Note: 21% don't know; 8% won't vote)	
28 September 2013	Sunday Independent	Millward Brown	998	37%	20%	42% (Note: 32% don't know; 10% won't vote)	
10–17 September 2013	Sunday Times	Behaviour & Attitudes	934	49%	33%	18% (Note: 15% don't know; 3% won't vote)	
9–11 September 2013	Sunday Business Post	Red C	>1,000	50%	35%	15%	
5–7 August 2013	Paddy Power	Red C	1,002	49%	36%	15%	
15 June 2013	The Irish Times	Ipsos/MRBI	1,000	55%	21%	24%	
13 June 2013	Paddy Power	Red C	?	52%	34%	14%	
November 2012	The Irish Times	Ipsos/MRBI	?	55%	22%	23%	

Notes

Future of Seanad
Date	Source	Polling agency	Sample size	Abolish	Reform	Keep as is	Undecided	Ref
late August 2013	Sunday Independent	Millward Brown	?	39%	33%	7%	21%	
3–12 August 2013	Sunday Independent	Millward Brown	985	37%	33%	7%	23%	
7 July 2013	Sunday Independent	Millward Brown	?	43%	30%	5%	22%	
December 2012	Sunday Independent	Millward Brown	?	53%	30%	7%	10%	
June 2011	Sunday Independent	Millward Brown	?	55%	30%	7%	8%	

== Result ==
Dublin City Council apologised after using an out-of-date electoral register file to generate polling information cards; this resulted in 35,000 voters and deceased people receiving incorrect information about where to vote. Cards were regenerated using the correct data.

Thirty-second Amendment of the Constitution Bill 2013
Choice	Votes	%
For	591,937	48.27
Against	634,437	51.73
Total	1,226,374	100.00
Valid votes	1,226,374	98.84
Invalid/blank votes	14,355	1.16
Total votes	1,240,729	100.00
Registered voters/turnout	3,167,484	39.17

Results by constituency
Constituency	Electorate	Turnout (%)	Votes		Proportion of votes	
Constituency	Electorate	Turnout (%)	Yes	No	Yes	No
Carlow–Kilkenny	111,304	37.2%	20,247	20,680	49.5%	50.5%
Cavan–Monaghan	100,434	34.5%	18,705	15,382	54.9%	45.1%
Clare	79,295	38.6%	15,480	14,676	51.3%	48.7%
Cork East	81,534	39.0%	15,251	16,129	48.6%	51.4%
Cork North-Central	74,928	38.6%	14,806	13,755	51.8%	48.2%
Cork North-West	62,118	42.1%	12,896	12,924	49.9%	50.1%
Cork South-Central	90,662	42.3%	18,507	19,470	48.7%	51.3%
Cork South-West	59,813	42.4%	12,770	12,300	50.9%	49.1%
Donegal North-East	58,032	29.3%	8,097	8,663	48.3%	51.7%
Donegal South-West	61,656	30.5%	9,195	9,351	49.6%	50.4%
Dublin Central	55,018	36.9%	8,458	11,625	42.1%	57.9%
Dublin Mid-West	65,093	38.2%	11,155	13,469	45.3%	54.7%
Dublin North	69,488	40.7%	12,695	15,311	45.3%	54.7%
Dublin North-Central	53,884	48.2%	11,663	14,121	45.2%	54.8%
Dublin North-East	58,444	43.7%	11,497	13,811	45.4%	54.6%
Dublin North-West	50,943	36.4%	8,282	9,997	45.3%	54.7%
Dublin South	101,884	46.0%	21,756	24,743	46.8%	53.2%
Dublin South-Central	79,173	38.2%	12,976	16,896	43.4%	56.6%
Dublin South-East	55,442	40.6%	8,629	13,683	38.7%	61.3%
Dublin South-West	69,879	38.0%	12,532	13,749	47.7%	52.3%
Dublin West	62,192	39.0%	10,213	13,865	42.4%	57.6%
Dún Laoghaire	79,207	46.2%	15,568	20,724	42.9%	57.1%
Galway East	82,588	36.1%	15,080	14,274	51.4%	48.6%
Galway West	91,994	35.7%	16,009	16,436	49.3%	50.7%
Kerry North–West Limerick	61,998	37.1%	12,205	10,465	53.8%	46.2%
Kerry South	56,532	39.2%	11,935	9,973	54.5%	45.5%
Kildare North	75,043	41.1%	13,890	16,712	45.4%	54.6%
Kildare South	57,454	38.1%	9,649	12,041	44.5%	55.5%
Laois–Offaly	106,057	37.4%	18,062	21,108	46.1%	53.9%
Limerick	65,186	38.4%	12,454	12,233	50.5%	49.5%
Limerick City	64,909	38.0%	12,831	11,509'	52.7%	47.3%
Longford–Westmeath	85,791	36.9%	15,911	15,273	51.0%	49.0%
Louth	102,088	37.9%	18,278	20,067	47.7%	52.3%
Mayo	94,860	38.0%	20,440	15,133	57.5%	42.5%
Meath East	64,440	37.4%	11,335	12,569	47.4%	52.6%
Meath West	62,891	35.8%	10,325	11,934	46.4%	53.6%
Roscommon–South Leitrim	59,006	43.0%	12,952	12,114	51.7%	48.3%
Sligo–North Leitrim	60,228	39.8%	11,988	11,631	50.8%	49.2%
Tipperary North	62,233	42.8%	13,202	13,001	50.4%	49.6%
Tipperary South	56,060	41.7%	11,631	11,444	50.4%	49.6%
Waterford	76,442	40.7%	14,270	16,391	46.5%	53.5%
Wexford	106,329	38.7%	20,255	20,324	49.9%	50.1%
Wicklow	94,932	45.0%	17,857	24,481	42.2%	57.8%
Total	3,167,484	39.2%	591,937	634,437	48.3%	51.7%

== Reactions ==
Kenny's reaction included that he was "personally disappointed" but that "sometimes in politics you get a wallop in the electoral process. I accept the verdict of the people...It is not about parties, it is not about leaders, it is not about government because there wasn't a government campaign here. It was the people's day and the people's decision and that's the people's absolute right and I think from that point of view this is the ultimate exercise in democracy."
