= Democracy Matters (Ireland) =

Irish campaign group

- Formation: 2012
- Type: Campaign group
- Legal status: Active
- Purpose: Campaign for a 'No' vote on Seanad abolition and advocating reform instead.
- Location: Ireland
- Website: www.democracymatters.ie
- Formerly called: Seanad Reform Group

Democracy Matters is an Irish campaign group set up to campaign for the retention of Seanad Éireann, the upper house of the Oireachtas or parliament. It was set up to oppose the 2013 bill to abolish the Seanad introduced by the Fine Gael–Labour government. After the defeat of the bill at referendum, Democracy Matters has remained in existence to argue for reform of the Seanad and the relationship between it and Dáil Éireann, the more powerful lower house of the Oireachtas.

== Anti-abolition campaign ==
Fine Gael and Labour both included Seanad abolition in their manifestos for the 2011 general election, and it was in their ensuing program for government. In 2012, a group of political figures launched the Seanad Reform Group to oppose this, which drafted a document proposing Seanad reform. The group's founders were serving senators Katherine Zappone and Feargal Quinn, former minister and senator Michael McDowell, former senator Joe O'Toole, and Fianna Fáil activist Noel Whelan. Other members included DCU academic Professor Gary Murphy and Dr. Suzanne Egan, UCD School of Law.

The Seanad Reform Group later renamed itself Democracy Matters. Zappone introduced a private member's bill to replace the restricted-franchise Seanad election with general-franchise elections. The group's campaign slogan was "Open it Don't Close it". It presented the abolition bill as a power-grab by a government which had already kept the Dáil on a tight leash.

Other supporting the campaign group included historian Diarmaid Ferriter, independent TD Finian McGrath, former minister and senator Mary O'Rourke, and former minister Eamon Ryan. On 20 September 2013 the group launched a poster campaign for a No-vote in the referendum. Labour backbenchers were free to oppose the party in the referendum campaign, and senator Ivana Bacik and TDs Joanna Tuffy and Michael McCarthy joined Democracy Matters canvassing.

== Post-referendum ==
The referendum held on 4 October 2013 rejected the abolition bill by 51.73% to 48.27% on a turnout of 39.17%. Democracy Matters marked the 100th day after the referendum on 13 January 2014 with a press conference, at which it criticised the government's subsequent inaction on Seanad reform, and presented further plans of its own to that end. The group occasionally issued statements thereafter on its Facebook page, with its most recent posting having been in October 2019.
