= Golden hello =

Term used in accounting and contractual law

In accounting and contractual law, "golden hello" is a term used for several different arrangements. Examples include a payment made to induce an employee to take up employment from a specific employer in form of a welcome package or a payment from a rival employer to entice the employee to leave the other company. A government may also pay an employer (private company) during an economic recession to take on new staff, usually superfluously, when job openings in general are scarce. In the United Kingdom, it can additionally refer to a financial incentive for graduates in science, technology, engineering, and mathematics (STEM) who are pursuing a career in teaching.

== Risks and advantages ==
=== If the employee is worth the money ===
A hiring company may spend millions of dollars for a golden hello package, hoping the poached executive generates more benefits for them than the cost of bonuses. After the 2008 financial crisis, such compensation methods have become controversial.

=== If the payment rate is right ===
It's difficult to make the payment rate be an incentive for employees. Generally, employees who are senior-level receive higher golden hellos than entry-level or mid-level employees, considering the skills, experience and talent for specific positions.

=== Attracting talented recruitment ===
In a study by Aerotek and the Human Capital Institute, 46% of professionals (570) at companies said that the best way to attract senior-level employees is bonuses. Employers can offer a one-time signing bonus or promise a specific timeline for raises to salaries.

=== Building trust between employee and new hire ===
Golden Hello build the foundation for a positive relationship between an employer and a new employee. The study indicated that trust is built between employers and new hire when employers offer signing bonuses. This is also incentive for new employers to work harder.

== Golden hello for academies ==
In the UK, a golden hello is financial incentive, not for executives, but for attracting graduates in STEM (science, technology, engineering and maths) into teaching in a maintained secondary school.

The scholarships, funded by Department of Education, were introduced in 2011 and are offering £30,000 for graduates with a good degree in physics, chemistry, computing or maths in 2016/17.

According to the document of National College for Teaching and Leadership, golden hello is only available to teachers "who trained through a postgraduate initial teacher training (ITT) course leading to qualified teacher status (QTS)". Teachers must meet the training, teaching and application criteria, in order to be eligible for golden hello payment.

== Golden hello for high-ranking executives ==
In the United States, golden hellos are typically offered to high-ranking executives by major corporations and may be valued in the millions of dollars. They are said to have become "larger and more common" starting around the mid-1990s.
