= 2013 Bahamian gambling referendum =

- 28 January 2013

Do you support the regulation and taxation of Web Shop gaming?
For	39.29%
Against	60.71%

Do you support the establishment of a National Lottery?
For	40.44%
Against	59.56%

A referendum on legalising web shops and establishing a national lottery was held in the Bahamas on 28 January 2013. Both proposals were rejected by voters.

== Background ==
Gambling is currently illegal for Bahamian citizens. However, illegal gambling establishments known as "web shops" allow betting on American lottery numbers. The referendum had been a campaign promise of the Progressive Liberal Party prior to the 2012 general elections. After winning the elections, plans were announced in Parliament on 1 November 2012 to hold a referendum on legalising web shops on 3 December. However, on 16 November a further announcement was made that the national lottery question would also be asked and a new date of 28 January 2013 was proposed.

Legalising and regulating the web shops was supported by Prime Minister Perry Christie, who claimed it could raise $20 million a year in tax revenues. However, religious groups opposed the move.

== Results ==
Do you support the regulation and taxation of Web Shop gaming?

Choice	Votes	%
For	32,533	39.29
Against	50,270	60.71
Invalid/blank votes		–
Total	82,803	100
Source: Bahamas Local

Do you support the establishment of a National Lottery?

Choice	Votes	%
For	32,850	40.44
Against	48,389	59.56
Invalid/blank votes		–
Total	81,239	100
Source: Bahamas Local
