= 2013 Micronesian general election =

2013 Micronesian parliamentary election
- 5 March 2013

10 out of 14 seats in Congress

Parliamentary elections were held in the Federated States of Micronesia on 5 March 2013 for the 10 seats in the Congress elected for a two-year term. A total of 21 candidates ran for election. Three MPs were elected unopposed.

== Results ==
State	Constituency	Candidate	Votes	%	Notes
Chuuk	Election District 1	Florencio Singkoro Harper	2,463	100	Incumbent
Chuuk	Election District 1	Total	2,463	100	
Chuuk	Election District 2	Victor Gouland	2,525	50.4	Elected
Chuuk	Election District 2	Roger Mori	2,464	49.6	Incumbent
Chuuk	Election District 2	Total	4,989	100	
Chuuk	Election District 3	Bonsiano Fasy Nethon	3,181	50.6	Incumbent, re-elected
Chuuk	Election District 3	Augustina Takashy	1,539	24.5	
Chuuk	Election District 3	Michael Kanas	1,561	24.9	
Chuuk	Election District 3	Total	6,281	100	
Chuuk	Election District 4	Tiwiter Aritos	3,442	53.0	Incumbent, re-elected
Chuuk	Election District 4	Setiro Paul	3,050	47.0	
Chuuk	Election District 4	Total	6,492	100	
Chuuk	Election District 5	Tony Otto	813	29.0	Incumbent, re-elected
Chuuk	Election District 5	Ruphin Micky	554	19.8	
Chuuk	Election District 5	Williander Jack	539	19.3	
Chuuk	Election District 5	Robson Romolow	511	18.3	
Chuuk	Election District 5	Moses Nelson	382	13.6	
Chuuk	Election District 5	Total	2,799	100	
Kosrae	Election District	Paliknoa Welly	2,106	69.60	Incumbent, re-elected
Kosrae	Election District	Johnson Asher	920	30.40	
Kosrae	Election District	Total	3,026	100	
Pohnpei	Election District 1	Dohsis Halbert	2,489	52.17	Incumbent, re-elected
Pohnpei	Election District 1	Ferny Perman	2,271	47.60	
Pohnpei	Election District 1	Write-in votes	11	0.23	
Pohnpei	Election District 1	Total	4,771	100	
Pohnpei	Election District 2	Berney Martin	2,981	54.83	Incumbent, re-elected
Pohnpei	Election District 2	Dion Neth	2,456	45.17	
Pohnpei	Election District 2	Total	5,437	100	
Pohnpei	Election District 3	David Panuelo	2,124	98.65	Incumbent, re-elected
Pohnpei	Election District 3	Write-in votes	29	1.35	
Pohnpei	Election District 3	Total	2,153	100	
Yap	Election District	Isaac Figir	2,692	100	Incumbent, re-elected
Yap	Election District	Total	2,692	100	
Source: Kaselehlie Press, Adam Carr
