= 2013 Swiss referendums =

Eleven national referendums were held in Switzerland during 2013. Voters approved six proposals related to spatial planning, executive pay, family policy, amendments to the laws on asylum and epidemics and an increase in the length of petrol station shop opening hours. The other five proposals on directly electing the Federal Council, abolishing compulsory military service, limiting salaries in a company to 12 times the lowest paid worker, tax credits for stay-at-home parents and an increase in road tax were rejected.

== March referendums ==
The first three national referendums in 2013 were held on 3 March, with voters asked whether they supported a federal order on family policy, an amendment to the federal law on spatial planning, and a popular initiative on executive pay that would introduce binding shareholder votes on salary levels, as well as banning golden hellos for new employees and golden parachutes for departing staff. The family policy question was approved by a majority of voters, but rejected by a majority of cantons. The planning question was approved by a majority of voters and did not require a cantonal majority. The executive pay initiative was approved by around two-thirds of voters and all cantons.

=== Proposals ===
==== Family policy ====
On 15 June 2012 a federal order was passed on family planning. It would make an amendment to the Swiss Constitution requiring the federal government to work with cantonal governments to promote work–life balance and improve the provision of day care, as well as ensuring the needs of families are considered in government policies.

==== Planning ====
On 15 June 2012 an amendment to the federal law on spatial planning was passed, which limited the amount of land available to communities for development purposes to that equivalent needed for the next fifteen years. It also introduced a 20% tax rate on land transactions for owners of land for development.

==== Executive pay ====
The proposals were conceived by Thomas Minder, who launched a campaign in 2008 following significant losses at UBS, which were blamed on a bonus culture leading to excessive risk-taking by managers. They would amend legislation to:

- require an annual vote by shareholders for the president and other members of the management board of directors, members of the remuneration committee, and any advisory board and executive officers of the organisation.
- require the articles of association to include bonus schemes and pay plans for directors and executive officers, any loans granted to such employees, the number of mandates outside the organisation, and the duration of employment contracts of executive officers.
- ban advance and severance packages.
- ban corporate proxy and the representation of shareholders by depository banks.
- require pension funds to disclose the way it votes, and to vote in the interests of pension policyholders.

Polls in January 2013 suggested that a majority was in favour of the proposals, although they were opposed by the Economiesuisse business lobby and the Swiss government. Supporters of the initiative spent 200,000 Swiss Francs, while opponents spent 8 million Swiss Francs in their campaign to block reform.

=== Electoral system ===
Eleven cantons allowed overseas voters to vote online after the Federal Council approved the method in December 2012.

=== Results ===
Question	For		Against		Invalid/ blank	Total votes	Registered voters	Turnout	Cantons for		Cantons against		Result
Question	Votes	%	Votes	%	Invalid/ blank	Total votes	Registered voters	Turnout	Full	Half	Full	Half	Result
Family policy	1,283,951	54.35	1,078,531	45.65	49,613	2,412,095	5,174,680	46.61	9	2	11	4	Rejected
Planning	1,476,942	62.89	871,514	37.11	58,331	2,406,787	5,174,680	46.51					Accepted
Executive pay	1,616,184	67.96	761,975	32.04	40,666	2,418,825	5,174,680	46.74	20	6	0	0	Accepted
Source: Direct Democracy

== June referendums ==
Two referendums were held on 9 June on a popular initiative on introducing direct elections to the Federal Council, and on amendments to the Asylum Act.

=== Proposals ===
==== Asylum law amendments ====
The changes to the Asylum Law would give the Federal government increased powers to speed up the process. It would also abolish the right to apply for asylum at Swiss embassies overseas, as well as excluding conscientious objectors and deserters from applying.

The proposals were opposed by left-wing parties, trade unions, human rights groups and church groups. Prior to the referendum, opinion polls showed support for the proposals at 57%. The changes to the law were ultimately approved by almost 80% of voters.

==== Direct election of the Federal Council ====
The proposal for direct election of the Federal Council, which would involve amending the Swiss Federal Constitution, was put forward by the Swiss People's Party. Opinion polls in late May showed 66% of voters opposed. The proposal was ultimately rejected by 76% of voters.

=== Results ===
Question	For		Against		Invalid/ blank	Total votes	Registered voters	Turnout	Cantons for		Cantons against		Result
Question	Votes	%	Votes	%	Invalid/ blank	Total votes	Registered voters	Turnout	Full	Half	Full	Half	Result
Asylum law	1,573,007	78.45	432,174	21.55	38,911	2,044,092	5,184,426	39.43					Accepted
Federal Council	480,291	23.66	1,550,080	76.34	18,293	2,048,664	5,184,426	39.52	0	0	20	6	Rejected
Source: Government of Switzerland, Government of Switzerland

== September referendums ==
Three federal referendums were held on 22 September 2013. The abolition of compulsory military service was rejected, whilst an amendment to epidemia law and an increase in the opening hours of petrol station shops were both approved.

=== Results ===
Question	For		Against		Invalid/ blank	Total votes	Registered voters	Turnout	Cantons for		Cantons against		Result
Question	Votes	%	Votes	%	Invalid/ blank	Total votes	Registered voters	Turnout	Full	Half	Full	Half	Result
Abolition of compulsory military service	644,985	26.8	1,762,811	73.2	32,740	2,440,536	5,194,150	47.0	0	0	20	6	Rejected
Amendment to the epidemia law	1,395,607	59.0	968,078	41.0	65,302	2,428,987	5,194,150	46.76					Accepted
Increase petrol station shop opening hours	1,345,662	56.7	1,025,817	43.3	57,956	2,429,435	5,194,150	46.77					Accepted
Source: Government of Switzerland, Government of Switzerland, Government of Switzerland

== November referendums ==
Three referendums were held on 24 November on a proposed increase in road tax, limiting the highest salary in a company to twelve times the lowest salary, and tax credits for stay-at-home parents. All three were rejected by voters.

=== Results ===
Question	For		Against		Invalid/ blank	Total votes	Registered voters	Turnout	Cantons for		Cantons against		Result
Question	Votes	%	Votes	%	Invalid/ blank	Total votes	Registered voters	Turnout	Full	Half	Full	Half	Result
Salary capping using the 1:12 ratio	954,787	34.7	1,796,930	65.3	39,365	2,791,082	5,203,973	53.63	0	0	20	6	Rejected
Tax credits for stay-at-home parents	1,139,670	41.5	1,604,491	58.5	44,564	2,788,725	5,203,973	53.59	2	1	18	5	Rejected
Increase in road tax	1,087,368	39.5	1,662,748	60.5	39,935	2,790,051	5,203,973	53.61					Rejected
Source: Government of Switzerland, Government of Switzerland, Government of Switzerland
