= Noel Whelan (politician) =

Barrister and adviser for the Fianna Fáil party in Ireland (1968–2019)

Personal details
- Born: 24 November 1968 County Wexford, Ireland
- Died: 10 July 2019 (aged 50)
- Party: Fianna Fáil
- Profession: Barrister

Noel Whelan (24 November 1968 – 10 July 2019) was a barrister and adviser for the Fianna Fáil party in Ireland. He was also considered a political analyst, and his opinions on elections, anniversaries and other political events were regularly sought by the mainstream media. He ran for Fianna Fáil in the 1997 general election.

Whelan wrote a weekly column in The Irish Times, had a degree and Masters in History and Politics, and wrote Fianna Fáil: A Biography of the Party. He has also addressed the McGill Summer School in Glenties, County Donegal. He wrote The Tallyman's Handbook ahead of each of the 2007, 2011, and 2016 Irish General Elections and co-wrote Ireland Says Yes: The Inside Story of How the Vote for Marriage Equality Was Won, an analysis of the Irish marriage equality referendum, 2015.

When Bertie Ahern resigned as Taoiseach in 2008, the views of various personalities were sought by the mainstream media. Whelan said: "The country has celebrated 10 years of peace on the island and more than a decade of strong economic growth. Enoch Powell said all political careers end in failure. This one hasn't; it's ended under pressure."

Whelan was married to Sinead McSweeney, and was the son of Wexford Councillor Seamus Whelan.

He died on 10 July 2019, at the age of 50.
