= Shudo Junior and Senior High School =

Coordinates: 34.3730°N 132.4567°E

Shudo Junior & Senior High School
- 修道中学校・修道高等学校
- Hiroshima City, Hiroshima Prefecture, Japan

Information
- Type: Private
- Motto: 質実剛健、知徳併進
- Established: 1725; 301 years ago
- Grades: 7–12
- Gender: Boys
- Enrollment: 280 per grade
- Color: Dark red
- Website: Shudo J&S

Shudo Junior and Senior High School (修道中学校・修道高等学校) is a university-preparatory school for boys located in Hiroshima City. It is one of the oldest high schools in Japan, with a history of over 290 years. The school was founded within the Hiroshima Castle by the Fifth Lord of Hiroshima Domain (広島藩), Yoshinaga Asano, in 1725. Shudo was originally the Domain School (藩校) teaching sons of samurais in the feudal domain, but was changed to a private school by the Twelfth Lord, Nagakoto Asano, in 1878. The school, students and teachers suffered severely from the atomic bomb dropped on Hiroshima City in 1945.

Shudo is known as one of the prestigious schools in Japan. Shudo has educated generations of Japanese statesmen, bureaucrats, artists, professors, businessmen and athletes including Tomosaburo Kato, 12th Prime Minister of Japan, and Kōji Kikkawa, rock musician and actor.

Football, swimming and climbing teams of the school have won the All Japan High School Championships several times. Shogi (Japanese chess) and Shodo (Japanese calligraphy) teams also have become the national champions.

== Notable alumni ==
- Tomosaburo Kato, 12th Prime Minister of Japan, Admiral of the Fleet
- Shizuka Kamei, Minister of Exports and Minister of Construction
- Tetsuo Saito, Minister of Environment
- Seizō Kobayashi, Minister of State, Governor-General of Taiwan, Commander of the Combined Fleet
- Masaaki Fujita, President of the House of Councillors
- Keizō Nozaki, Attorney General, Member of the House of Lords
- Yūzan Fujita, Governor of Hiroshima Prefecture
- Sukeyuki Ban, Mayor of Hiroshima City
- Setsuo Yamada, Mayor of Hiroshima City
- Takeshi Araki, Mayor of Hiroshima City
- Tadashi Satō, Mayor of Hiroshima City
- Daisuke Matsumoto, Member of the House of Representatives
- Yoshitake Masuhara, Member of the House of Representatives
- San'yō Rai, Confucianist philosopher, historian, artist and poet
- Hakaru Masumoto, Physicist, pioneer in metal and alloy research
- Akinori Noma, Physiologist, discoverer of ATP-sensitive potassium channel
- Yoshiaki Yoshimi, historian
- Kazuo Tsukuda, CEO of Mitsubishi Heavy Industries
- Kōhei Matsuda, CEO of Mazda
- Kazuyoshi Kino, Buddhist scholar
- Ikuo Hirayama, Traditional Japanese-style painter
- Sōkei Ueda, 16th grand master of Ueda Sōko-ryū tea ceremony school
- Minoru Sasaki, Lieutenant-General of Imperial Army, commander at Battle of New Georgia
- Yōzō Kaneko, Major-General of Imperial Navy, founder of Imperial Navy Air Service
- Kenji Fukui, Television announcer
- Kazuhiko Yukawa, screenwriter
- Daisuke Nishio, Animator and director
- Keiichi Nanba, Anime voice actor
- Kōji Kikkawa, Rock musician and actor
- Tobi, Singer, composer and lyricist of Les Romanesques
- Tatsugo Kawaishi, Olympic swimming medalist dead in the Battle of Iwo Jima
- Kentaro Kawatsu, Olympic swimming medalist
- Tsutomu Ōyokota, Olympic swimming medalist
- Hiroshi Nagata, Olympic medalist of field hockey
- Takaji Mori, Olympic football medalist
- Ryota Yamagata, Olympic medalist of sprint relay
- Yukio Shimomura, Football player, member of Olympic national team

== See also ==
- Meanings of minor planet names: 9001–10000 (Minor planet 9436 was named Shudo after this school).
- Secondary education in Japan
- Higher education in Japan
