= Hiroshima Peace Memorial Ceremony =

Annual Japanese vigil held in Hiroshima on August 6

Hiroshima Peace Memorial Ceremony is an annual Japanese vigil.

B-roll of the ceremony

Every August 6, "A-Bomb Day", the city of Hiroshima holds the Peace Memorial Ceremony to console the victims of the atomic bombs and to pray for the realization of lasting world peace. The ceremony is held in front of the Memorial Cenotaph in Hiroshima Peace Memorial Park. Participants include the families of the deceased and people from all over the world. The first ceremony was held in 1947 by the then Hiroshima Mayor Shinzo Hamai.

== Contents of the ceremony ==
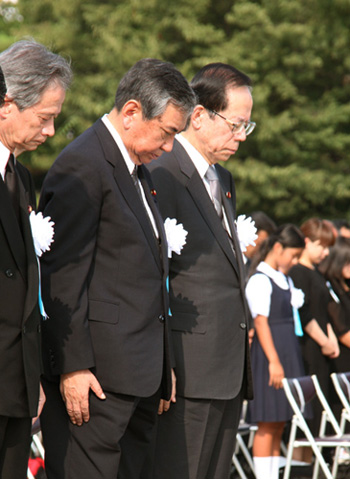
Satsuki Eda (President of the House of Councillors), Yōhei Kōno (President of the House of Representatives) and Yasuo Fukuda (Prime Minister) offered a silent prayer (August 6, 2008)

- Dedication of Water (by the citizen representatives of Hiroshima), accompanied (since 1968) by the music "Prelude" by composer Kunio Ootsuki
- Opening
- Dedication of the Register of the Names of the Fallen Atomic Bomb Victims
- Address
- Dedication of flowers, accompanied (since 1975) by the music "Prayer Music No. 1: Dirge" by Hibakusha composer Masaru Kawasaki
- Silent Prayer and Peace Bell (for one minute from 8:15am)
  - The bell is rung by one representative of bereaved families and one representative of children
- Peace Declaration (by Mayor of Hiroshima)
- Release of Doves
- Commitment to Peace (by Children's representatives)
- Addresses (by Prime Minister of Japan and other visitors)
- Hiroshima Peace Song, with music by Minoru Yamamoto and lyrics by Yoshio Shigezono
- Closing

== Memorial ceremonies for Hiroshima outside Japan ==
Due to the dissemination of the memorial culture surrounding Hiroshima worldwide, memorial ceremonies were and are being held also in other parts of the world. One such instance was on August 6, 1986, as a delegation from Hiroshima of 18 individuals arrived at the Israeli Holocaust memorial of Yad Vashem and held a brief ceremony at the Yizkor Hall.

== United States ==
In 2010, John V. Roos became the first United States ambassador to Japan to attend the ceremony, paving the way for a historic visit to Hiroshima by then president Barack Obama six years later.

== See also ==
- Hiroshima Peace Memorial Park
- Atomic bombings of Hiroshima and Nagasaki
- Hiroshima Witness
- Hiroshima rages, Nagasaki prays
