= 1974 in politics =

- Years in politics: 1971 1972 1973 1974 1975 1976 1977
- Centuries: 19th century · 20th century · 21st century
- Decades: 1940s 1950s 1960s 1970s 1980s 1990s 2000s
- Years: 1971 1972 1973 1974 1975 1976 1977

1974 in politics covers information on political events occurred worldwide.

== Events ==
- January 2 - Richard Nixon signs a bill lowering the maximum U.S. speed limit to 55 MPH in order to conserve gasoline during an OPEC embargo.
- January 4 - U.S. President Richard Nixon refuses to hand over materials subpoenaed by the Senate Watergate Committee.
- February 22 - Pakistan recognizes Bangladesh.
- February 28 - After seven years, the United States and Egypt re-establish diplomatic relations.
- February 28 - General election in the U.K. results in no majority for any party; Labour will form a minority government until October despite having received fewer votes nationally than the Conservatives. See February 1974 United Kingdom general election.
- March 4 - Harold Wilson replaces Edward Heath as Prime Minister of the UK.
- March 1 - Watergate scandal: Seven are indicted for their role in the Watergate break-in and charged with conspiracy to obstruct justice.
- April 25 - Portuguese democratic revolution.
- May 18 - "Smiling Buddha" nuclear weapon test by India.
- June 29 - Isabel Perón replaces Juan Perón as President of Argentina.
- July 20 - Turkey invades the country of Cyprus and occupies the northern third of the island (later declared the Turkish Republic of Northern Cyprus).
- August 9 - President Richard Nixon of the USA resigns, and is replaced with Gerald Ford.
- September 1 - Acting Hugh Watt replaces deceased Norman Kirk as Prime Minister of New Zealand.
- September 6 - Bill Rowling replaces acting Hugh Watt as Prime Minister of New Zealand.
- September 12 - Ethiopian Emperor Haile Selassie ousted in a coup by the Derg.
- October 10 - General election in the UK is won narrowly by Labour. See October 1974 United Kingdom general election.

== See also ==
- 1973 in politics
- other events of 1974
- List of years in politics
