= Hiroshima: In Memoriam and Today =

Collection of stories of Hiroshima atomic bomb survivors

- Author: Hitoshi Takayama (editor)

Hiroshima: In Memoriam and Today is a collection of stories of survivors of the atomic bombing of Hiroshima on August 6, 1945. It was edited by Hitoshi Takayama. It also contains a number of opinions and messages from world leaders including Pope John Paul II, Australian prime ministers Gough Whitlam and Malcolm Fraser, South African president F.W. de Klerk and UN secretary general Kurt Waldheim. It was first published in 1969 and 1971 as Hiroshima: In Memoriam and then republished in 1973, 1975, 1979, 1982 and 2000 under the current title.

== Structure ==
Part One: The Hiroshima Experience 50 Years Later

Chapter 1: Memoirs of A-bomb survivors

- Confession of a Korean-born Japanese Survivor - Eiichi Hashimoto
- Burned, and Burned Again: How the A-bomb Changed My Life - Sunao Tsuboi
- The Importance of Telling What Happened - Suzuko Numata
- The Monster - Tamotsu Eguchi
- Witnessing to A-bomb Terror - Akihiro Takahashi
- Cherishing the Life My Mother Gave Me - Michiko Yamaoka
- Let There Be Kindness and Peace: What I learned from My Ordeal - Fukujun Kaku
- A Prayer for Second-generation Survivors - Masahiro Yoshioka
- The Survivors Mission, 50 Years Later - Takeshi Itoh
- Love Triumphs Over Power: The Rule Of Life - Ichiro Moritaki

Chapter 2: Concerned Citizens' Voices

- The 50th anniversary of the Atomic Bombing - Hiroshima Mayor Takashi Hiraoka
- Thoughts on the Atomic Bombing's 50th Anniversary - Teruo Sanuki
- A Voice From Hiroshima - Yasuo Harada
- Hiroshima's Challenge - Takashiro Kurisu
- The Enola Gay and American Conscience: Reflections on the Smithsonian Debate - Michio Okamoto
- Judgment! Using Nuclear Arms is a crime - Teruaki Fukuhara
- The City of Hiroshima, Peace Declaration - Hiroshima Mayor Tadatoshi Akita

Chapter 3: Supportive Voices from Overseas

- Appeal for Peace - Pope John Paul II
- Call to Real Commitment - Former prime minister Malcolm Fraser Australia
- Heed Now Hiroshima's Lesson - Dr Oscar Arias, Costa Rica
- Dismantling Nuclear Forces - F.W. de Klerk South Africa
- Hiroshima Ad Memoria! - A.A. Bessmertnykh, Russia

Part Two: The Hiroshima Experience After 25 Years

Chapter 4 Earlier Memoirs of A-bomb Experiences

- Diary of an Atomic Bomb Survivor After 25 years - Teruo Sanuki
- Our Family's A-bomb experience - Toshio Murakami
- That Fateful Day - Masuto Higaki
- Instant Inferno - Hitoshi Takayama
- I Hate 'Hiroshima' - Shigetoshi Wakaki
- Hiroshima What It Means To You and Me - Takuo Matsumoto
- A Memorial Tribute to Two Young Victims of the Atomic Bomb - Fumiko Ochiai
- The Appeal of a Girl Survivor - Miyoko Matsubara
- My Son Died When He Was Seven Years Old - Kenzo Nagoya
- Mother Was Exposed to the A-bomb - Junko Ryoba
- Grief for My Lost Parents - Wataru Fujimoto
- A Child Exposed In Utero - Chizuno Nagaoka
- My Life Since August 6, 1945 - Kametoshi Sakimoto
- From My Sickbed - Shizuko Nishimoto
- Mingled Feelings of Wrath and Lament - Masuo Masumiya
- The Hibakusha Are Still Suffering - Haruko Yukinari
- Diabolic Radiation: An Elderly A-bomb Survivor's Tale of Agony - Motoichi Oride
- A Korean Survivor's Appeal - Kang Mun Hee
- Peace Education Based on A-bomb Experiences - Hiroshi Morishita

Chapter 5: Hiroshima Today A Roundtable Conference: The Victims Speak

Voices of Hiroshima Citizens

- Message of Commendation - Hiroshima Mayor Takeshi Araki
- Peace Is The Hope of All Mankind - Kazumitsu Aihara
- Delayed Death - Tomin Harada
- Hiroshima and Humanity - Soichi Iijima
- The Role of the Hiroshima Peace Memorial Museum - Kaoru Augur
- Pearl Harbor and Hiroshima - Naomi Shohno

Chapter 6: Voices of the World

- Thoughts on the Atomic Bombing of Hiroshima - Arnold Joseph Toynbee
- A Grace Period for Turning to Peace - Alfred Kastler
- A Time For Those Who Care - Barbara Reynolds
- One World or No World - Gunther Anders
- Toward a Peaceful World Commonwealth - Janet E and AA Hook
- Hiroshima: Symbol of Fear and Hope - Imgeborg Kufter
- Scientific Experiments - Ira Morris
- Teaching Peace Without Hatred - Beate Seefeld
- This Cause Will Triumph - Philip J. Noel-Baker
- Appeals Are Futile Without Action - Anatol Rapoport
- World Opinion for Peace - Shinichiro Tomonaga
- The "New Man" of Peace - Tibor Barther

Chapter 7: Messages from Foreign Leaders

- United Nations - Kurt Waldheim
- UNESCO - Amadou-Mahtar M'Bow
- Australia - EG Whitlam
- Austria - Bruno Kreisky
- New Zealand - Bill Rowling
- Peru - Edgardo Mercado Jarrin
- Pakistan - Anwar Ali Khoja
- Saudi Arabia - Mohammad Al-Nowaiser
- Turkey - Suleyman Demire
