= 1973 in politics =

- Years in politics: 1970 1971 1972 1973 1974 1975 1976
- Centuries: 19th century · 20th century · 21st century
- Decades: 1940s 1950s 1960s 1970s 1980s 1990s 2000s
- Years: 1970 1971 1972 1973 1974 1975 1976

These are some of the notable events relating to politics in 1973.

- August - Sixpence withdrawn from general use in the UK marking the end of the decimalisation period.
- 24 September - Portuguese Guinea proclaims independence from Portugal as Guinea-Bissau.
- 18 October - Trygve Bratteli replaces Lars Korvald as prime minister of Norway.
- 18 December - Prime minister Anker Jørgensen of Denmark resigns and is replaced with Poul Hartling.
