= 2023 Hiroshima mayoral election =

Local election in Japan

- 9 April 2023
- Turnout: 34.53%▼2.09%
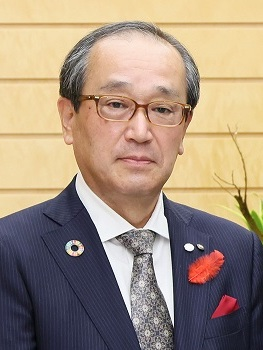

Candidate	Kazumi Matsui	Atsumi Takami	Hiroshi Oyama
Party	Independent	JCP	Independent
Popular vote	258,336	36,595	28,186
Percentage	80.0%	11.3%	8.7%
Supported by	LDP, Komeito
Mayor before election
Kazumi Matsui
Independent
Elected mayor
Kazumi Matsui
Independent

The 2023 Hiroshima Mayoral Election was held on April 9th, 2023, to elect the new mayor of Hiroshima. It was held as part of the 2023 Japanese unified local elections. The election saw incumbent mayor Kazumi Matsui winning a landslide victory for re-election. His majority of 80% of the vote was followed by Atsumi Takami, a member of the Japanese Communist Party, with 11.3% of the vote.

== Candidates ==
- Kazumi Matsui, Incumbent mayor of Hokkaido, Former Secretary-General of the Central Labor Relations Commission of the Ministry of Health, Labor and Welfare, he ran as an independent, and was supported by the Liberal Democratic Party of Japan and Komeito
- Atsumi Takami, Secretary-General of the Hiroshima Prefectural Committee of the Japanese Communist Party. He ran as part of the Japanese Communist Party.
- Hiroshi Oyama, Former employee of an automobile company, he ran as an Independent, and was supported by no political party.
