= Tadatoshi Akiba =

Japanese mathematician and politician

- 秋葉 忠利
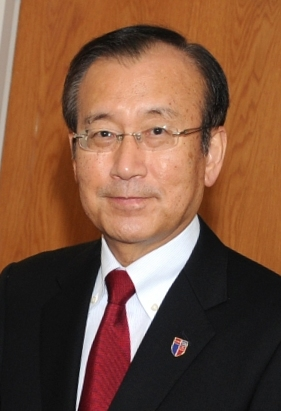
- Akiba in 2010

Mayor of Hiroshima
- In office 23 February 1999 – 7 April 2011
- Preceded by: Takashi Hiraoka
- Succeeded by: Kazumi Matsui

Member of the House of Representatives
- In office 19 February 1990 – 11 January 1999
- Preceded by: Tōru Ōhara
- Succeeded by: Fumiko Chikuma
- Constituency: Hiroshima 1st (1990–1996); Chūgoku PR (1996–1999)

Personal details
- Born: 3 November 1942 (age 83) Arakawa, Tokyo, Japan
- Party: Social Democratic
- Other political affiliations: Socialist (1990–1996)
- Education: University of Tokyo; Massachusetts Institute of Technology
- Awards: • Nuclear-Free Future Award (2007) • Ramon Magsaysay Award (2010) • Order of Cultural Independence Rubén Darío •Ahmadiyya Muslim Prize for the Advancement of Peace (2022)

Tadatoshi Akiba (秋葉 忠利, Akiba Tadatoshi; born November 3, 1942) is a Japanese mathematician and politician and served as the mayor of the city of Hiroshima, Japan from 1999 to 2011.

== Early life ==
He studied mathematics at the University of Tokyo, receiving a B.S. in 1966 and an M.S. in 1968. He continued his studies under John Milnor at the Massachusetts Institute of Technology, earning his PhD in mathematics in 1970. He took teaching jobs at a series of universities: State University of New York at Stony Brook (1970), Tufts University (1972–1986), and Hiroshima Shudo University (1986–1997). His research was on topology, with an interest in homotopy groups.

While at Tufts, Akiba established the Hibakusha Travel Grant program, which brought several American print and broadcast journalists annually to Hiroshima in August, to craft stories about the city (and typically about the experiences of those exposed to the atomic bomb in 1945).

== Political career ==
As a member of the Social Democratic Party, he was elected to the House of Representatives, and served from 1990 to 1999. He assumed office as mayor of Hiroshima in February, 1999, and was reelected to this position in 2003 and in April 2007.

== Peace activities ==
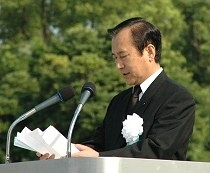
Akiba during his speech at Hiroshima Peace Memorial Park on August 6, 2005

As mayor, he has been a visible peace activist. He is active in the Mayors for Peace organization, serving as the president of their World Conference. The 2020 Vision Campaign launched in 2003, which aims to eliminate nuclear weapons, has earned Mayors for Peace the "World Citizenship Award" from the Nuclear Age Peace Foundation in 2004, the "Sean McBride" Award from the International Peace Bureau in 2006, and the Nuclear-Free Future Award from the Franz-Moll Foundation in 2007. He has also been an advocate of the abolition of nuclear weapons, and a vocal critic of George W. Bush. Since May 2007 he is also Councillor at the World Future Council.

In 2007 he received the Nuclear-Free Future Award in the solutions category.

He was longlisted for the 2008 World Mayor award, but failed to win, as the award went to Mayor Helen Zille of Cape Town, Republic of South Africa.

On January 21, 2010, he attended the 78th winter meeting of the U.S. Conference of Mayors as a special guest speaker, and in that capacity attended the reception held at the White House and met US President Barack Obama. He is so far the only serving Mayor of Hiroshima who has officially met a serving US president.

In August 2010, he received the Ramon Magsaysay Award for his advocacy for nuclear disarmament, and in April 2013 he was awarded the Otto Hahn Peace Medal from the United Nations Association of Germany (DGVN) and the Governing Mayor of Berlin.

Akiba is on the Board of Advisors of the Global Security Institute.

Hiroshima is one place outside the United States where Martin Luther King Jr. Day is observed with equal importance as in the United States. Tadatoshi Akiba holds a special banquet at the mayor's office as an act of unifying his city's call for peace with King's message of human rights.

In August 2022, he was awarded the Ahmadiyya Muslim Prize for the Advancement of Peace. He participated in the 2026 Winter Olympics opening ceremony.

== Stepping down as mayor ==
In the new year address on January 4, 2011, Akiba announced he would not run for reelection during the mayoral election scheduled for April 10, 2011. No reasons were given. In early April it was reported that Hiroshima University has appointed Akiba as special professor, effective from his retirement as mayor. On April 10, Kazumi Matsui was elected the new Mayor. On August 3, 2012, he was appointed chairman of the Middle Powers Initiative (MPI), an international network of non-governmental organizations working for nuclear disarmament.

== Works ==
=== Translation ===
- Linear algebra / Ichiro Satake; translated by Sebastian Koh, Tadatoshi Akiba, Shin-ichiro Ihara

== See also ==
- List of peace activists

Preceded by Takashi Hiraoka	Mayor of Hiroshima; 1999–2011	Succeeded by Kazumi Matsui
