= Wakami Fujita =

Japanese politician

- 藤田 若水
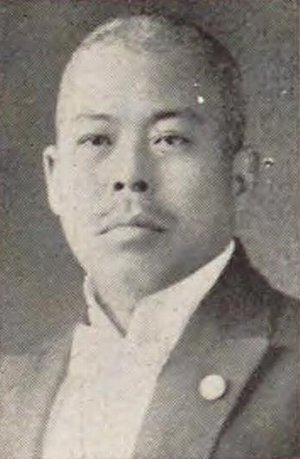
- Fujita in 1928

Mayor of Hiroshima
- In office 26 December 1939 – 9 May 1943
- Preceded by: Kintarō Yokoyama
- Succeeded by: Senkichi Awaya

Member of the House of Representatives
- In office 5 December 1927 – c. 1942
- Preceded by: Satoru Kōno
- Succeeded by: Multi-member district
- Constituency: Hiroshima 6th (1927–1928); Hiroshima 1st (1928–1942)

Personal details
- Born: 11 December 1876 Niihama, Ehime, Japan
- Died: 30 December 1951 (aged 75)
- Party: Rikken Minseitō
- Education: Waseda University

Wakami Fujita (藤田 若水, Fujita Wakami; 11 December 1876 – 30 December 1951) was mayor of Hiroshima from 1939 to 1943. He survived the atomic attack on Hiroshima on 6 August 1945, and continued working for the Hiroshima municipality until 1947, when the US authorities purged him from his duties. In January 1946, he was appointed as chairman of the special Restoration Bureau established by the mayor Shichirō Kihara. After losing the right to work, he supported the policies of mayor Shinzo Hamai in reconstruction.

He died of stomach cancer.

| Preceded by Kintarō Yokoyama | Mayor of Hiroshima; December 1939 – May 1943 | Succeeded by Senkichi Awaya |
