= Fumiko Chikuma =

Japanese politician (born 1937)

- 知久馬 二三子

Member of the House of Representatives
- In office 21 January 1999 – 2 June 2000
- Preceded by: Tadatoshi Akiba
- Succeeded by: Tetsuo Kaneko
- Constituency: Chūgoku PR

Member of the Misasa Town Council
- In office 2001–2013
- In office 1997–1999

Personal details
- Born: 1 February 1937 (age 88) Tottori Prefecture, Japan
- Party: Social Democratic

Fumiko Chikuma (知久馬 二三子, Chikuma Fumiko; born 1 February 1937) is a Japanese Social Democratic Party (SDP) politician who was a member of the House of Representatives from 1999 until 2000. Prior to her election, she worked as a local government official for Mitoku, Tottori and its successor Misasa and as director of Misasa Town Library, before being elected to the latter's town council in 1997, remaining there until 2013.

== Biography ==
Chikuma was born on 1 February 1937. After graduating from Misasa Junior High School, she started working at the Mitoku Village Office and, after the village was merged into Misasa, Tottori in 1953, served as the town's director of health policy and as director of Misasa Town Library.

In the 1996 Japanese general election, she ran as the Social Democratic Party candidate for the Tottori 1st district but came second to Shigeru Ishiba; she also came second in the Chūgoku proportional representation block, which had only one winning SDP candidate. The following year, she was elected to Misasa Town Council. In 1999, after Tadatoshi Akiba resigned to successfully run for mayor of Hiroshima, she was elected to the House of Representatives, before losing in the 2000 Japanese general election. Additionally, she has served as representative director of the SDP's Tottori Prefectural Association.

After being unseated from the national Diet, she remained in Misasa Town Council, and she was re-elected in 2001, 2005, and 2009, However, she did not stand for office in the 2013 election.
