= Yoshio Shigezono =

Yoshio Shigezono 重園 贇雄
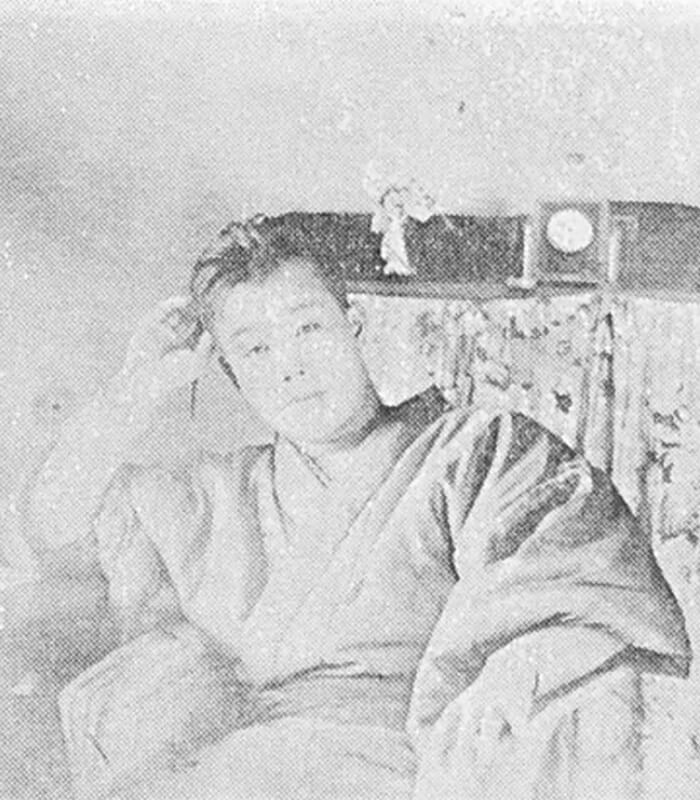
- Photographed in Changchun, in 1931

Background information
- Born: 19 January 1908; Hilo, Hawaii, United States
- Origin: Kuwanashi Village (cullently Mihara), Hiroshima Prefecture, Japan
- Died: 29 December 1980 (aged 72)
- Genres: Classical
- Occupations: Teacher, lyricist

Yoshio Shigezono (重園 贇雄, Shigezono Yoshio; 19 January 1908 – 29 December 1980) was a Japanese lyricist and music teacher. He is known principally for writing the words for the Hiroshima Peace Song.

== Biography ==
Born in 1908, in Hilo, Hawaii, died in 1980, in Hiroshima Prefecture, Japan.

At the time he wrote the words for the Hiroshima Peace Song, he was at Toyota Middle School, in Toyota Village, Toyota District, Hiroshima.

Shigezono also wrote the lyrics for numerous school anthems in the Hiroshima area, e.g. Minamigata Primary School in Mihara, Toyosaka Middle School in Higashi Hiroshima, Kouzan Junior High School in Sera, and Tadanoumi High School in Takehara.

He also wrote songs for organizations such as the Keiyu Club in Kure and the Japan Gymnastics Festival (April 1956), as well as a popular song "Mr Penguin" (March 1951).

== Hiroshima Peace Song ==
In mid-1947, Shinzō Hamai, mayor of Hiroshima and a strong advocate for developing the city as a centre of peace, supported plans first proposed by Harushi Ishijima of the Tourism Association of the City of Hiroshima that "holding a large-scale peace festival, focused on August 6, will enable us to make a strong appeal for peace to the public, including people around the world".

The Hiroshima Peace Festival Association was established in June (with Hamai as chair and Ishijima as vice-chair), and in July solicited submissions for a song, with the result that the Hiroshima Peace Song was selected on 22 July 1947. The tune was by Minoru Yamamoto, another music teacher, while the lyrics were by Shigezono. It was performed at the Hiroshima Peace Memorial Ceremony for the first time that year, on 6 August, and has been sung at the event ever since apart from 1950, when the ceremony was abruptly cancelled due to pressure from the occupation forces related to the Korean War and possible use of the atomic bomb there.

== Bibliography ==
- ひとりの教師像: 重園贇雄の足跡と歌, 1981
- 重園贇雄先生を偲ぶ: 続ひとりの教師像, 1988
