= Senkichi =

- Gender: Male

Origin
- Origin: Japanese
- Meaning: Different meanings depending on the kanji used

Senkichi (written: 仙吉 or 千吉) is a masculine Japanese given name. Notable people with the name include:

- Senkichi Awaya (粟屋 仙吉) (1893–1945), Japanese government official and mayor
- Senkichi Taniguchi (谷口 千吉) (1912–2007), Japanese film director and screenwriter
