= Sukeyuki =

- Gender: Male

Origin
- Origin: Japanese
- Meaning: Different meanings depending on the kanji used

Sukeyuki (written: 祐亨) is a masculine Japanese given name. Notable people with the name include:

- Sukeyuki Ban (伴 資健; 1835–1913), Japanese mayor
- Itō Sukeyuki (伊東 祐亨; 1843–1914), Imperial Japanese Navy admiral
