= Minoru Yamamoto =

Japanese composer

Minoru Yamamoto 山本 秀
- Born: 1912 or 1913
- Died: 5 October 1996 (aged 83)
- Genres: Classical
- Occupations: Teacher, composer
- Instruments: piano, voice

Minoru Yamamoto (山本 秀, Yamamoto Minoru; 1912 or 1913 to 5 October 1996) was a Japanese composer. He is known principally for writing the tune for the Hiroshima Peace Song.

== Biography ==
After graduating from Tokyo Music School's teacher training course in 1936, Yamamoto went to work as teacher in Maebashi Girls' High School (now Maebashi Municipal High School ja:前橋市立前橋高等学校）, then Hiroshima Normal School ja:広島師範学校, which in 1951 became Shinonome Elementary School and Junior High School Attached to Hiroshima University ja:広島大学附属東雲小学校・中学校 where he stayed until his retirement. Yamamoto was also active in a local educational association, referred to variously as 広島教育音楽連盟 (Hiroshima Education Music Federation) or 広島中等教育音楽協会 (Hiroshima Middle Education Music Association).

His speciality was music tuition, and he compiled many textbooks and piano tutors for teacher training students, as well as publishing academic articles on subjects such as how to teach 'tone deaf' children to sing.

Yamamoto composed nearly 100 school anthems in addition to the Peace Song, and also performed as a choral conductor and in opera. After retiring in 1976, he became a Professor Emeritus of Hiroshima University but continued to teach at Hiroshima Bunkyo Women's University.

== Hiroshima Peace Song ==
In mid-1947, Shinzō Hamai, mayor of Hiroshima and a strong advocate for developing the city as a centre of peace, supported plans first proposed by Harushi Ishijima of the Tourism Association of the City of Hiroshima that "holding a large-scale peace festival, focused on August 6, will enable us to make a strong appeal for peace to the public, including people around the world".

The Hiroshima Peace Festival Association was established in June (with Hamai as chair and Ishijima as vice-chair), and in July solicited submissions for a song, with the result that the Hiroshima Peace Song was selected on 22 July 1947. The tune was by Yamamoto, while the lyrics were by Yoshio Shigezono, another music teacher. It was performed at the Hiroshima Peace Memorial Ceremony for the first time that year, on 6 August, and has been sung at the event ever since apart from 1950, when the ceremony was abruptly cancelled due to pressure from the occupation forces related to the Korean War and possible use of the atomic bomb there.
