= Shigetada Morishita =

Japanese politician

- 森下 重格

Acting Mayor of Hiroshima
- In office 7 August 1945 – 22 October 1945
- Preceded by: Senkichi Awaya
- Succeeded by: Shichirō Kihara

Personal details
- Born: December 1891 Tokushima Prefecture, Japan
- Died: 21 December 1956 (aged 64–65)
- Education: Hosei University; Tokyo School of Foreign Languages

Shigetada Morishita (森下 重格, Morishita Shigetada; December 1891 – 21 December 1956) was a Japanese politician who served as the Interim Mayor of Hiroshima from 7 August to 22 October 1945.

== Work at Hiroshima municipality ==
Morishita served as vice mayor of Hiroshima under mayor Senkichi Awaya prior to the atomic destruction of his city, holding that position from September 1943 to August 1945. He was appointed acting mayor following the death of the previous mayor Senkichi Awaya in the atomic attack on Hiroshima. He remained acting mayor for a brief period, until Shichirō Kihara was nominated mayor of Hiroshima on 22 October 1945. Following Kihara's appointment as mayor, Morishita served as vice mayor until his resignation on 10 December after finding out he had leukemia.

== Later career ==
After recuperating for two years in Zushi, Kanagawa Prefecture, he was appointed deputy prosecutor at the Yokohama District Public Prosecutor's Office. In 1952, he resigned from his position due to cerebral arteriosclerosis and continued to recuperate, but he did not recover, and in December 1956, he developed pneumonia and died on 21 December.

Preceded by Senkichi Awaya	Mayor of Hiroshima; August – October 1945	Succeeded by Shichirō Kihara
