= 1975 in politics =

This is a list of events relating to politics in 1975.

== Events ==
=== January ===
- January 1 - John N. Mitchell, H. R. Haldeman and John Ehrlichman are found guilty of the Watergate cover-up
- January 4 - Khmer Rouge forces begin a siege of Phnom Penh as the North Vietnamese army sweeps through Laos, South Vietnam and Cambodia
- January 15 - The Alvor Agreement is signed, formally ending the Angolan War of Independence and establishing a timeline for Angolan independence
- January 16 - The IRA call off a 25-day ceasefire
- January 27 -
  - Five IRA bombs go off in London and 19 are injured by a blast in Manchester
  - Creation of the Church Committee by the US Senate, which goes on to expose federal intelligence abuses including Operation MKULTRA, COINTELPRO and Family Jewels

=== February ===
- February 2 - Ethiopia attack rebel positions outside Asmara
- February 5 - Argentinian president Isabel Perón declares Operativo Independencia aiming to crush the People's Revolutionary Army, the first large-scale military operation of the Dirty War
- February 11 - In Britain, Margaret Thatcher is elected leader of the Conservative Party
- February 13 - Turkish Cypriot leader Rauf Denktash declares Northern Cyprus independent
- February 27 - Peter Lorenz, CDU candidate for mayor of West Berlin, is kidnapped by the 2 June Movement

=== March ===
- March 6 - Iran and Iraq sign the Algiers Agreement
- March 10 - North Vietnamese troops attack Ban Mê Thuột in South Vietnam on their way to capturing Saigon
- March 11 - Failed right-wing coup attempt in Portugal by former president, António de Spínola
- March 31 - The Iraqi army launch a general assault on mountain positions held by Kurdish rebels in northern Iraq

=== April ===
- April 15 - 1975 Beirut bus massacre, in which 27 Palestinians are killed by members of a Phalangist militia, sparks city-wide sectarian crashes between Phalangists and Palestinians, beginning the Lebanese Civil War
- April 17 - Khmer Rouge takeover of Cambodia, ending the civil war
- April 26 - Socialist victory in Portugal's first free elections in 50 years
- April 29 - Operation Frequent Wind begins, evacuating American civilians and "at-risk" Vietnamese from Saigon
- April 30 - North Vietnam capture Saigon, leading to the collapse of South Vietnam and the retreat of remaining American personnel

=== May ===
- May 4 - Ulster victory in elections to the Ulster Convention in Northern Ireland
- May 21 - Beginning of the Stammheim trial of the Red Army Faction in Germany

=== June ===
- June 6 - The United Kingdom vote to remain in the European Communities
- June 12 - Indira Gandhi is found guilty of electoral corruption by the Allahabad High Court
- June 16 - South Africa and the United Kingdom terminate the 1955 Simonstown agreement
- June 24 - Mozambique becomes independent from Portugal

=== July ===
- July 15 - Launch of the Apollo-Soyuz, the first collaborative space mission conducted by the US and the USSR

=== August ===
- August 15 - Coup in Bangladesh replaces one-party state with military junta

=== September ===
- September 5 - Failed assassination attempt of American president Gerald Ford
- September 22 - Second unsuccessful attempt to assassinate Gerald Ford
- September 26 - The martial law administration of Bangladesh enact a law providing legal immunity to all involved in the assassination of Sheikh Mujibur Rahman
- September 28 - Protests across Europe against the execution of five Basque "urban guerrillas" by Spain; the Spanish embassy in the Netherlands is set on fire

=== October ===
- October 9 - Andrei Sakharov wins Nobel Peace Prize
- October 23 - The first rounds are exchanged in the Battle of the Hotels in Lebanon

=== November ===
- November 11 - Gough Whitlam is dismissed as prime minister of Australia by Sir John Kerr, Governor-General
- November 14 - Spain agrees to retreat from Spanish Sahara
- November 22 - Juan Carlos becomes King of Spain following the announcement of General Franco's death to the public

=== December ===
- December 31 - In the UK, the Sex Discrimination Act is passed and the Equal Pay Act comes into force

== Births ==
- S'bu Zikode, president of the South African shack dwellers' movement, Abahlali baseMjondolo
- February 13 - Katie Hopkins, English far-right political commentator
- February 18 - Igor Dodon, Moldovan politician who served as the 5th president of Moldova from 2016 to 2020
- May 3 - Robert Turcescu, Romanian journalist and founder of the former political talk show 100%
- August 6 - Andrei Năstase, Moldovan politician who served as Deputy Prime Minister and Minister of Internal Affairs in 2019
- November 13 - Diana Șoșoacă, Romanian far-right politician and anti-vaccine activist serving as an MEP since 2024
- November 27 - Andrian Candu, Moldovan former politician serving as the presiding officer of parliament from 2015 to 2019
- December 21 - Charles Michel, Belgian politician who served as the prime minister of Belgium from 2014 to 2019 and as the president of the European Council from 2019 to 2024

== Deaths ==
=== January ===
- January 6 - United States senator for Montana between 1923-1947, Burton Wheeler

=== February ===
- February 11 - Head of State of Madagascar, Richard Ratsimandrava
- February 25 - Black separatist and second leader of the Nation of Islam, Elijah Muhammad

=== March ===
- March 18 - Zimbabwean politician and nationalist leader who led the Zimbabwe African National Union, Herbert Chitepo
- March 19 - Ethiopian military officer and civil rights activist, Tadesse Birru
- March 25 - King Faisal of Saudi Arabia, assassinated by his nephew, Faisal bin Musaid
- March 31 - Egyptian politician and officer, Youssef Seddik

=== April ===
- April 5 - Taiwanese President, General Chiang Kai-shek
- April 10 - US Democrat politician, John Bailey
- April 12 - French civil rights activist, dancer, singer and actress, Josephine Baker
- April 13 - First President of Chad, François Tombalbaye

=== May ===
- May 1 - Prominent military figure in Francoist Spain and Morocco, Mohammed Meziane
- May 6 - Hungarian Cardinal Jozef Mindszenty, in exile

=== June ===
- June 3 - Former Japanese prime minister, Eisaku Satō
- June 28 - Coke R. Stevenson, 35th governor of Texas

=== July ===
- July 5 - American civil rights activist, Lillie May Carroll Jackson
- July 19 - U.S. Marine who served in the Rhodesian Army, John Alan Coey

=== August ===
- August 15 -
  - American neo-Nazi, Joseph Tommasi
  - Founding president of Bangladesh, Sheikh Mujibur Rahman
- August 27 - Emperor of Ethiopia, Haile Selassie
- August 29 - 3rd President of Ireland, Eamon de Valera

=== September ===
- September 2 - American suffragist, Mabel Vernon
- September 12 - Former prime minister of East Cameroon, Vincent de Paul Ahanda
- September 20 - Egyptian feminist, Doria Shafik

=== October ===
- October 2 - Indian independence activist and politician, K. Kamaraj

=== November ===
- November 5 - Former Republican mayor of Honolulu, Neal Blaisdell
- November 20 - Spanish dictator, Francisco Franco

=== December ===
- December 24 - Former prime minister of Comoros, Saïd Ibrahim Ben Ali
- December 26 - Mayor of Hiroshima, Setsuo Yamada
