= Keizō Nozaki =

Japanese politician

- 野崎 啓造
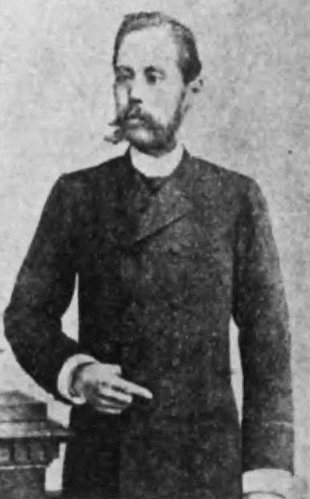

Prosecutor-General of Japan
- In office 4 November 1898 – 7 April 1904
- Prime Minister: Ōkuma Shigenobu; Yamagata Aritomo; Itō Hirobumi; Saionji Kinmochi (acting); Katsura Tarō
- Preceded by: Kuniomi Yokota
- Succeeded by: Kuniomi Yokota

Member of the House of Peers
- In office 13 December 1905 – 17 November 1910 Nominated by the Emperor

Personal details
- Born: 14 February 1852 Hiroshima, Aki, Japan
- Died: 17 November 1910 (aged 58)
- Education: Hiroshima Domain Academy

Keizō Nozaki (野崎 啓造, Nozaki Keizō; 14 February 1852 – 17 November 1910) was the 5th Attorney General of Japan from 1898 to 1904 and the member of the House of Peers. He was born in Hiroshima City, and worked as a prosecutor for some local courts.
