= Masatake Tanabe =

Mayor of Hiroshima

- 田部 正壮
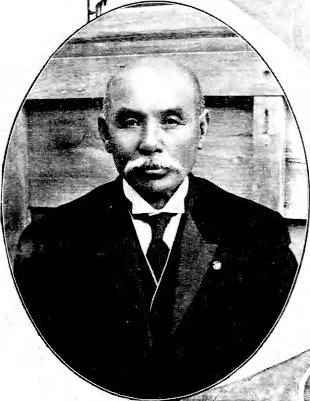

Mayor of Hiroshima
- In office 8 October 1917 – 7 October 1921
- Preceded by: Heizō Yoshimura
- Succeeded by: Nobuyasu Satō

Personal details
- Born: 21 December 1849 Aki Province, Japan
- Died: 21 September 1939 (aged 89)

Masatake Tanabe (田部正壮 Tanabe Masatake; 21 December 1849 – 21 September 1939) was the Mayor of Hiroshima from 8 October 1917 to 7 October 1921. Like other Mayors of Hiroshima since 1889, he was appointed by the Ministry of Interior in Tokyo.

| Preceded by Heizō Yoshimura | Mayor of Hiroshima; 1917–1921 | Succeeded by Nobuyasu Satō |
