= Nobuyasu Satō =

Japanese lawyer, prosecutor, bureaucrat and politician

- 佐藤 信安
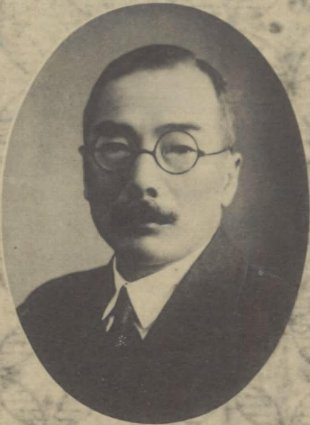
- Satō from Official Record of the Okayama Exposition

Mayor of Hiroshima
- In office 17 April 1922 – 21 January 1925

Personal details
- Born: April 5, 1874 Matsue, Shimane Prefecture, Empire of Japan
- Died: August 1, 1964 (aged 90)
- Education: Tokyo Imperial University

Nobuyasu Satō (Japanese: 佐藤 信安, Satō Nobuyasu; 5 April 1874 – 1 August 1964) was a Japanese lawyer, prosecutor, Home Ministry official, and politician who served as the Mayor of Hiroshima from 1922 to 1925.

== Early life and career ==
Satō was born in Matsue, Shimane Prefecture. He graduated from the Faculty of Law at Tokyo Imperial University in 1899 and was appointed as a judicial trainee. He entered the graduate school of Tokyo Imperial University in 1900 before being called up for military service in the Imperial Japanese Army.

In 1902, Satō resigned as a judicial trainee and entered private legal practice. In 1909, he became a public prosecutor and later served in several regional courts. He was appointed Chief of the Kumamoto Prefectural Police in 1913 and Chief of the Yamaguchi Prefectural Police the following year. He subsequently served as Director of the Internal Affairs Department of Fukushima Prefecture.

== Mayor of Hiroshima ==
Satō served as the 14th Mayor of Hiroshima from 17 April 1922 until 21 January 1925.

After leaving office, he served as Director of the Internal Affairs Department of Okayama Prefecture and later Niigata Prefecture. In July 1929, he was placed on leave from his post in Niigata. He subsequently returned to Tokyo and resumed work as a lawyer.

In 1963, Satō was named an honorary citizen of Hiroshima.

Preceded by Masatake Tanabe	Mayor of Hiroshima; August 1925 – August 1929	Succeeded by Ryōki Kawabuchi
