= Matasaburō Watanabe =

Japanese politician

- 渡辺 又三郎

Mayor of Hiroshima
- In office 9 September 1909 – 3 July 1910
- Preceded by: Kan'ichi Oda
- Succeeded by: Kenji Nagaya

Member of the House of Representatives
- In office 15 March 1898 – 10 June 1898
- Preceded by: Masao Tominaga
- Succeeded by: Kōzaburō Miyahara
- Constituency: Hiroshima 1st
- In office 1 July 1890 – 30 December 1893
- Preceded by: Constituency established
- Succeeded by: Takayuki Fujita
- Constituency: Hiroshima 1st

Personal details
- Born: April 1850
- Died: 18 July 1910 (aged 60)
- Party: Independent
- Relatives: Kintarō Yokoyama (son-in-law)

Matasaburō Watanabe (渡辺 又三郎 Watanabe Matasaburō; 1850–1910) was a Japanese politician who served as the Mayor of Hiroshima from 9 September 1909 to 3 July 1910.

Watanabe lived in Hiroshima Prefecture and served as Vice President of the Hiroshima Lawyers' Club. He was also among the owners of Chugoku Shimbun.

Preceded by Kan'ichi Oda	Mayor of Hiroshima; September 1909 – July 1910	Succeeded by Kenji Nagaya
