= Peace Declaration =

Peace Declaration is an annual speech delivered by the Mayor of Hiroshima on August 6, the day that city was destroyed by an atom bomb delivered by a US B-29. That speech has been delivered regularly since 1947, except for 1950, when the US occupation forces prohibited Mayor Shinzo Hamai to deliver the speech. The Peace Declaration at first touched upon issues such as nuclear disarmament, but since the 1980s also issues such as armed conflicts around the world in general.

A similar annual speech is also delivered by the Mayor of Nagasaki since 1948.

== Memorial ceremonies marked by special guests or features ==
Some of the memorial ceremonies were marked by statements by additional leaders than just the mayor of Hiroshima.

At the 1st ceremony in 1947, a message was read by General McArthur.

The 2nd ceremony in 1948 was attended by the Australian Commander of the British Commonwealth Occupation Force Gen. Horace Robertson.

The 1971 ceremony was the first attended by a Japanese prime minister Eisaku Satō.

The 1977 ceremony was the first attended by a UN official. UN General Assembly president Hamilton Shirley Amerasinghe was among the speakers.

The 2010 ceremony was the first attended by the US Ambassador to Japan.
