= Sadaji Itō =

Japanese politician

- 伊藤 貞次

Mayor of Hiroshima
- In office 16 May 1930 – 15 May 1934
- Preceded by: Ryōki Kawabuchi
- Succeeded by: Kanji Ida

Personal details
- Born: 17 January 1878 Iwafune, Niigata, Japan
- Died: 1943 (aged 64–65)
- Education: Waseda University

Sadaji Itō (17 January 1878 – 1943) was a Japanese politician who served as Mayor of the City of Hiroshima from May 1930 to May 1934.

| Preceded by Ryōki Kawabuchi | Mayor of Hiroshima; May 1930 – May 1934 | Succeeded by Kanji Ida |
