= Kanji Ida =

Japanese Home Ministry bureaucrat (1897–1988)

- 井田 完二
- Born: March 23, 1897; Unpama Village, Onyū, Fukui Prefecture, Japan (now Obama, Fukui)
- Died: 1988 (aged 90–91)
- Education: Kyoto Imperial University (LL.B.)
- Occupations: Bureaucrat, patent attorney
- Employer: Home Ministry
- Known for: Home Ministry official; Acting Mayor of Hiroshima

Kanji Ida (Japanese: 井田 完二, Ida Kanji; 23 March 1897 – 1988) was a Japanese Home Ministry bureaucrat. He held the court rank of Junior Sixth Rank and later headed the Ida Patent Office. He served as mayor of Hiroshima in 1934-1935.

== Early life and education ==
Ida was born in Unpama Village, Onyū, Fukui Prefecture (now Obama, Fukui). He was the second son of Kenji Ida. His elder brother was Katsuhisa Ida (Kōji Ida), a director of Nihon Kajo Publishing.

In 1922 he passed the Higher Civil Service Examination for the administrative service. In 1923 he graduated from the Faculty of Law of Kyoto Imperial University.

== Career ==
Ida entered the Home Ministry, serving as a police superintendent in Ishikawa Prefecture and as a local administrative official in Nara Prefecture, Saitama Prefecture, Ehime Prefecture, and Hiroshima Prefecture. He later served as Director of the Local Bond Division and Director of the Finance Division in the ministry's Local Affairs Bureau, and subsequently as Chief of Police for Miyagi Prefecture and Hiroshima Prefecture.

From 18 March 1934 to 19 January 1935, Ida served as acting head of the office of the Mayor of Hiroshima.

In 1945 he became a director of the Housing Corporation while concurrently serving as head of its Osaka branch. In 1949 he was appointed Director of Student Affairs at Osaka Prefecture University. After retiring, he opened a patent office in Kyoto.

== Personal life ==
Ida was a follower of Zen. His hobbies included tennis, rowing, and painting. He lived in Higashikido-chō, Nara.

His first wife, Akiko, was the third daughter of Dai Nippon Brewery auditor Kōtarō Uchida, and they had one son and one daughter.

Among his published works are the collections of tanka poetry Rakusho Nikki and Zoku Rakusho Nikki.

== Family ==
The Ida family residence in Higashikido-chō, Nara, was designated a Registered Tangible Cultural Property of Japan in 2002.

- Yasuko Ida (1913–2009), professor at Saho College and daughter of Kōsaku Uemura, a member of the House of Representatives for Nara.
- Brother: Katsuhisa Ida, director of Nihon Kajo Publishing.

Preceded by Sadaji Itō	Mayor of Hiroshima; 1934 – 1935	Succeeded by Kintarō Yokoyama
