= Yōzō Toyoshima =

Mayor of Hiroshima

- 豊島 陽蔵
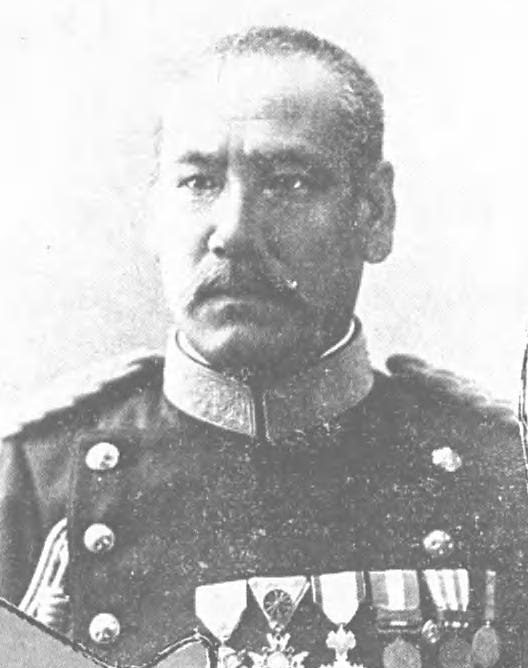

Mayor of Hiroshima
- In office 29 January 1914 – 2 April 1914
- Preceded by: Kenji Nagaya
- Succeeded by: Mitsutada Takeoka

Personal details
- Born: 15 October 1852 Yaga, Aki, Japan
- Died: 9 February 1922 (aged 69)
- Education: Imperial Japanese Army Academy

Yōzō Toyoshima (豊島 陽蔵, Toyoshima Yōzō; 15 October 1852 – 9 February 1922) was a Japanese army officer who served as the Mayor of Hiroshima from 29 January to 2 April 1914.

Preceded by Kenji Nagaya	Mayor of Hiroshima; January–April 1914	Succeeded by Mitsutada Takeoka
