= Hiroshima–Nagasaki Protocol =

Proposed protocol to the Treaty on the Non-Proliferation of Nuclear Weapons

The Hiroshima-Nagasaki Protocol is a proposed protocol complementary to the Treaty on the Non-Proliferation of Nuclear Weapons (NPT) being championed by the Mayors for Peace 2020 Vision Campaign gathering the support of local authorities and civil society actors all over the world. It seeks to challenge national governments to follow through on the commitments they made in Article VI of the Treaty. In this Article, the parties undertake to pursue "negotiations in good faith on effective measures relating to cessation of the nuclear arms race at an early date and to nuclear disarmament", and towards a "Treaty on general and complete disarmament under strict and effective international control". The Hiroshima–Nagasaki Protocol calls on the States Parties to the Treaty to live up to this "good faith" agreement. It challenges them to adopt an overarching approach to nuclear disarmament by the year 2020, rather than the go-nowhere-slowly step-by-step approach. It challenges the nuclear-weapon states to show good faith through unilateral reciprocal actions. Furthermore, it challenges the States Parties to adopt a legal-binding document, rather than the past political-pledges ignored or undermined by some of the nuclear-weapon States Parties in the past.

== Support for the Hiroshima-Nagasaki Protocol ==
The Hiroshima–Nagasaki Protocol is an important initiative, which is rapidly gaining momentum as cities around the world express their strong support for it. In June 2008, the U.S. Conference of Mayors (USCM) unanimously adopted a far-reaching resolution entitled “Support for the Elimination of All Nuclear Weapons by the Year 2020.” The USCM resolution recommends that the U.S. government “urgently consider” the Hiroshima–Nagasaki Protocol as a means of “fulfilling the promise of the NPT by the year 2020, thereby meeting the obligation founded by the International Court of Justice in 1996 to ‘conclude negotiations leading to nuclear disarmament in all its aspects under strict and effective international control.’” The resolution also encourages USCM members to sign the Cities Appeal being circulated in support of the Hiroshima–Nagasaki Protocol and to encourage other elected officials in their cities to do likewise.

== The Cities Appeal ==
Since May 2008, the main focus of the work of the 2020 Vision Campaign has been the signature drive for the Cities Appeal in support of the Hiroshima-Nagasaki Protocol.

By signing the Cities Appeal, Mayors and elected local officials around the world are given the chance to get behind the Hiroshima–Nagasaki Protocol ahead of the formal and final presentation of the results of the international signature drive at the 2010 NPT Review Conference at the United Nations Headquarters in New York.

As of February 2009, the number of signatories stands at 516 from 42 countries. They range from Sapporo (Japan) to San Francisco (USA), and from Rio de Janeiro (Brazil) and Cape Town (South Africa) as far as Toronto (Canada). Of these, 468 are mayoral signatures, each representing the solidarity of their own city or municipality with the cause of nuclear disarmament.

== Article I ==
Article I calls for a “clampdown” on all weapon-usable fissile materials – be they in weapons, reactors, or stocks – accompanied by a cessation of nuclear weapons acquisition and of all preparations for the use of nuclear weapons.

== Article II ==
Article II calls for establishment of a negotiating forum open to all states, with the sole purpose of developing a Nuclear Weapons Convention or Framework Agreement for achieving nuclear disarmament in all its aspects by the year 2020.

== Article III ==
Article III underscores the need for all states to contribute to the international control system and to continue to comply fully with their NPT obligations.
