= Shichirō Kihara =

Japanese politician

- 木原 七郎
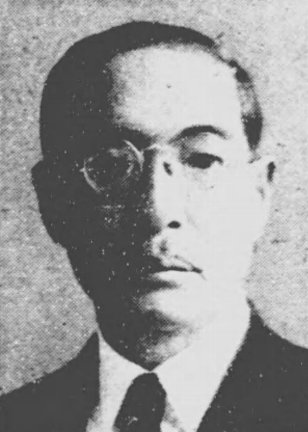
- Kihara in 1942

Mayor of Hiroshima
- In office 22 October 1945 – 22 March 1947
- Preceded by: Senkichi Awaya; Shigetada Morishita (acting)
- Succeeded by: Shinzo Hamai

Member of the House of Representatives
- In office 30 April 1937 – 18 December 1945
- Preceded by: Mitsugu Tanaka
- Succeeded by: Constituency abolished
- Constituency: Hiroshima 2nd
- In office 21 February 1930 – 21 January 1932
- Preceded by: Kōzaburō Miyahara
- Succeeded by: Watanabe Atsumu
- Constituency: Hiroshima 2nd

Personal details
- Born: 25 January 1884 Aki, Hiroshima, Japan
- Died: 24 December 1951 (aged 67) Tokyo, Japan
- Party: Independent
- Other political affiliations: CDP (1930–1940); IRAA (1940–1945)
- Education: Waseda University

Shichirō Kihara (木原 七郎, Kihara Shichirō; 25 January 1884 – 24 December 1951) was a Japanese politician who served as the Mayor of Hiroshima from 22 October 1945 to 22 March 1947 and was elected as member of the Hiroshima Prefectural Assembly in 1911.

== Early life and education ==
Kihara was born in Yano Village, Aki District, Hiroshima Prefecture (present Aki Ward, Hiroshima City). He graduated from Waseda University's Department of Politics and Economics in 1906.

== Political career ==
After serving as a member of the Hiroshima Prefectural Assembly, he ran for and was elected in the 17th general election for the House of Representatives in 1930 and served a total of three terms.

Following the atomic attack on Hiroshima on 6 August 1945, a period of political vacuum was created, as the city lay in ruins its mayor Senkichi Awaya was killed. Out of the 40 members of the city council, 8 were killed in the bombing and most living members were unable to attend sessions due to their injuries. In September 1945, the Hiroshima City Council held an emergency session where it decided to appoint Kihara as the new mayor, and following approval by the Ministry of Interior, he was inaugurated as mayor on 22 October 1945. As part of his policy of reconstruction, he established in January 1946 a separate department within Hiroshima municipality to make decisions on reconstruction without the need of city council approval and was officially titled Restoration Bureau, consisting of 30 members and headed by former mayor Wakami Fujita. He remained mayor of Hiroshima until he was dismissed by the US occupation authorities as part of the purge of Japanese officials who took part in supporting the Japanese military during the Second World War.

Following his dismissal from office, he supported the policies of Shinzo Hamai and kept working for him unofficially until his death.

| Preceded by Shigetada Morishita | Mayor of Hiroshima; 1945–1947 | Succeeded by Shinzo Hamai |
