= Heizō Yoshimura =

Japanese politician

- 吉村 平造

Mayor of Hiroshima
- In office 22 January 1915 – 25 December 1916
- Preceded by: Mitsutada Takeoka
- Succeeded by: Masatake Tanabe

Personal details
- Born: 1869 Sakata, Ōmi, Japan
- Died: 23 July 1935 (aged 65–66)
- Children: Kōzaburō Yoshimura
- Education: Meiji Law School

Heizō Yoshimura (1869 – 23 July 1935) was a Japanese politician who served as the Mayor of Hiroshima from January 1915 to December 1916.

Preceded by Mitsutada Takeoka	Mayor of Hiroshima; 1915–1916	Succeeded by Masatake Tanabe
