= Tadashi Satō (politician) =

Japanese mayor (1849–1920)

- 佐藤 正
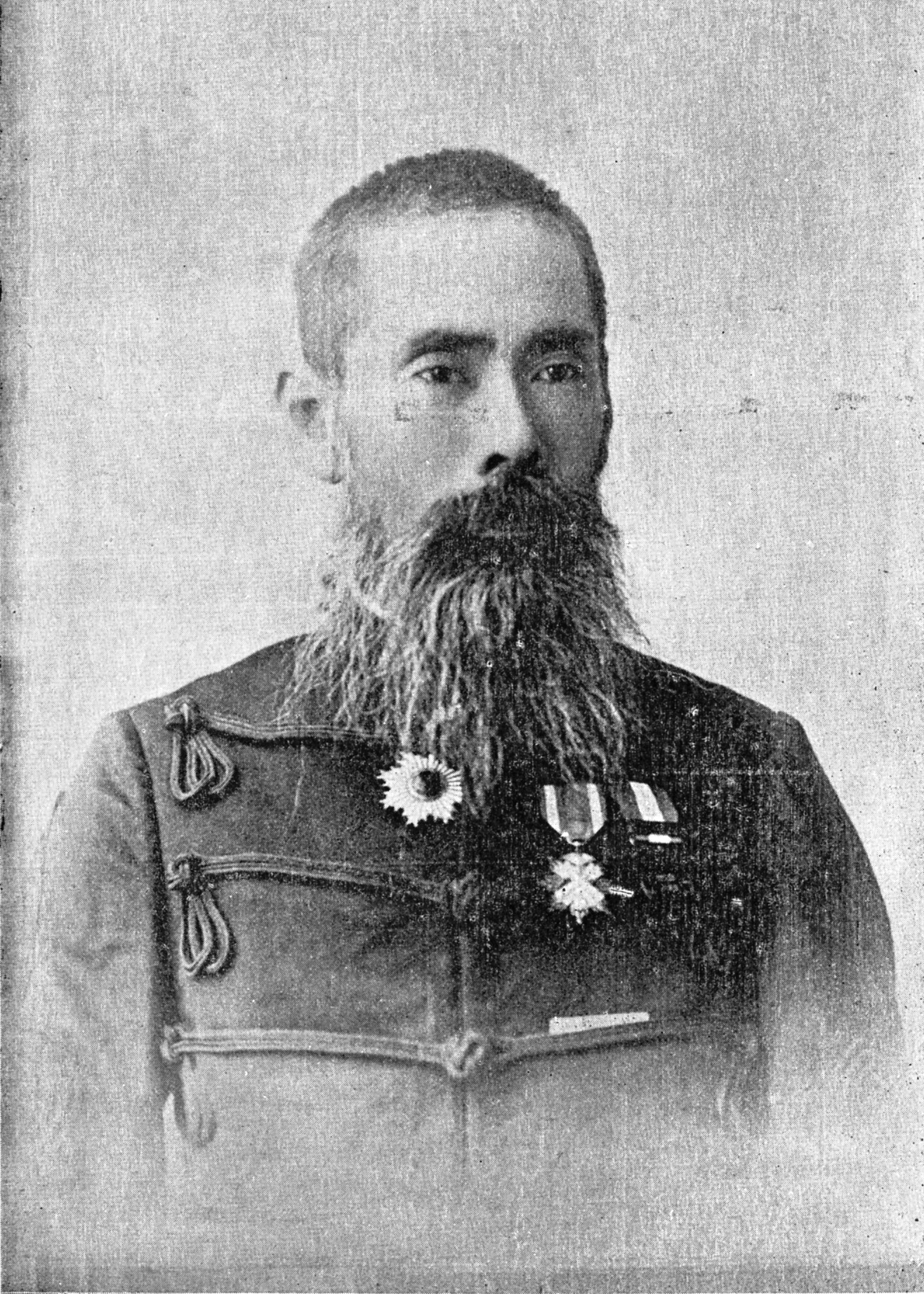
- Satō in 1899

Mayor of Hiroshima
- In office 10 January 1896 – 20 April 1896
- Preceded by: Sukeyuki Ban
- Succeeded by: Sukeyuki Ban

Personal details
- Born: 20 July 1849 Hiroshima, Aki, Japan
- Died: 27 April 1920 (aged 70)
- Education: Hiroshima Domain Academy

Tadashi Satō (佐藤 正, Satō Tadashi; 20 July 1849 – 27 April 1920) was a Japanese Army officer and politician.

As a lieutenant colonel in the Imperial Japanese Army, he was given command of the 18th Infantry Regiment on 29 October 1891. He was later promoted to colonel, and wounded in battle on 4 March 1895 during the First Sino-Japanese War.

As a politician, he was Mayor of Hiroshima from 10 January to 20 April 1896.

| Preceded by Sukeyuki Ban | Mayor of Hiroshima; January–April 1896 | Succeeded by Sukeyuki Ban |
