= Kintarō Yokoyama =

Japanese politician

- 横山 金太郎
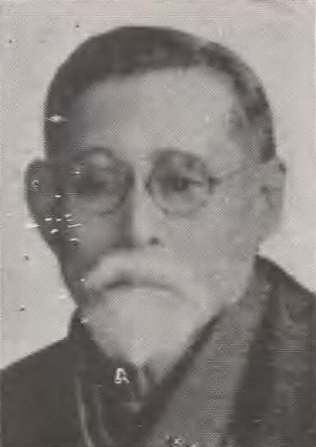

Mayor of Hiroshima
- In office 26 February 1935 – 25 February 1939
- Preceded by: Kanji Ida
- Succeeded by: Wakami Fujita

Member of the House of Representatives; from Hiroshima
- In office 25 May 1915 – 31 March 1937
- Preceded by: Multi-member district
- Succeeded by: Fukuichi Morita
- Constituency: Counties district (1915–1920); 5th district (1920–1928); 3rd district (1928–1937)
- In office 15 May 1908 – 14 May 1912
- Preceded by: Kan'ichi Oda
- Succeeded by: Multi-member district
- Constituency: Counties district

Personal details
- Born: 14 December 1868 Tōjō, Hiroshima, Japan
- Died: 25 September 1945 (aged 76)
- Party: Rikken Minseitō
- Other political affiliations: Rikken Seiyūkai (1908–1913); Chūseikai (1913–1916); Kenseikai (1916–1927)
- Relatives: Matasaburō Watanabe (father-in-law)
- Education: Tokyo College of Law

Kintarō Yokoyama (横山 金太郎 Yokoyama Kintarō; 14 December 1868 – 25 September 1945) was a Japanese politician who served as the Mayor of Hiroshima from 1935 to 1939.

Preceded by Kanji Ida	Mayor of Hiroshima; February 1935 – February 1939	Succeeded by Wakami Fujita
