= Tottori 1st district =

Legislative district of Japan

- Parliamentary constituency for the Japanese House of Representatives
- Numbered map of Tottori Prefecture single-member districts
- Prefecture: Tottori
- Proportional District: Chugoku
- Electorate: 226,751

Current constituency
- Created: 1994
- Seats: One
- Party: Liberal Democratic
- Representative: Shigeru Ishiba
- Municipalities: Kurayoshi, Tottori, Iwami District, Yazu District, and Tōhaku District (Town of Misasa).

Tottori 1st district is a parliamentary constituency in Tottori Prefecture that was created in 1994. It has been represented in the House of Representatives of the National Diet of Japan since 1996 by Shigeru Ishiba, the former Prime Minister and President of the Liberal Democratic Party from 2024 until his resignation in 2025.

It covers roughly the Eastern half of Tottori and consists of the cities of Tottori and Kurayoshi and the districts of Iwami, Yazu and the town of Misasa in Tōhaku District. In 2012, 256,020 eligible voters were registered in the district. In 2013 the town of Yurihama was transferred to the 2nd district. Before the 2021 elections, the district had 230,959 eligible voters, fewer than in any other single member electoral district.

Before the electoral reform of 1994, the area had been part of the Tottori at-large district where four Representatives had been elected by single non-transferable vote.

Tottori 1st district, like most of Chūgoku, usually votes for conservative candidates. The district is a "conservative kingdom" (保守王国, hoshu ōkoku), a stronghold of the Liberal Democratic Party, and its only representative since its creation has been Shigeru Ishiba (without faction, formerly Nukaga faction), secretary-general, former defense and agriculture minister, son of former Councillor and Tottori governor Jirō Ishiba and grandson of Tarō Kanamori, (appointed) governor of Tokushima and Yamagata in the 1930s.

== List of representatives ==
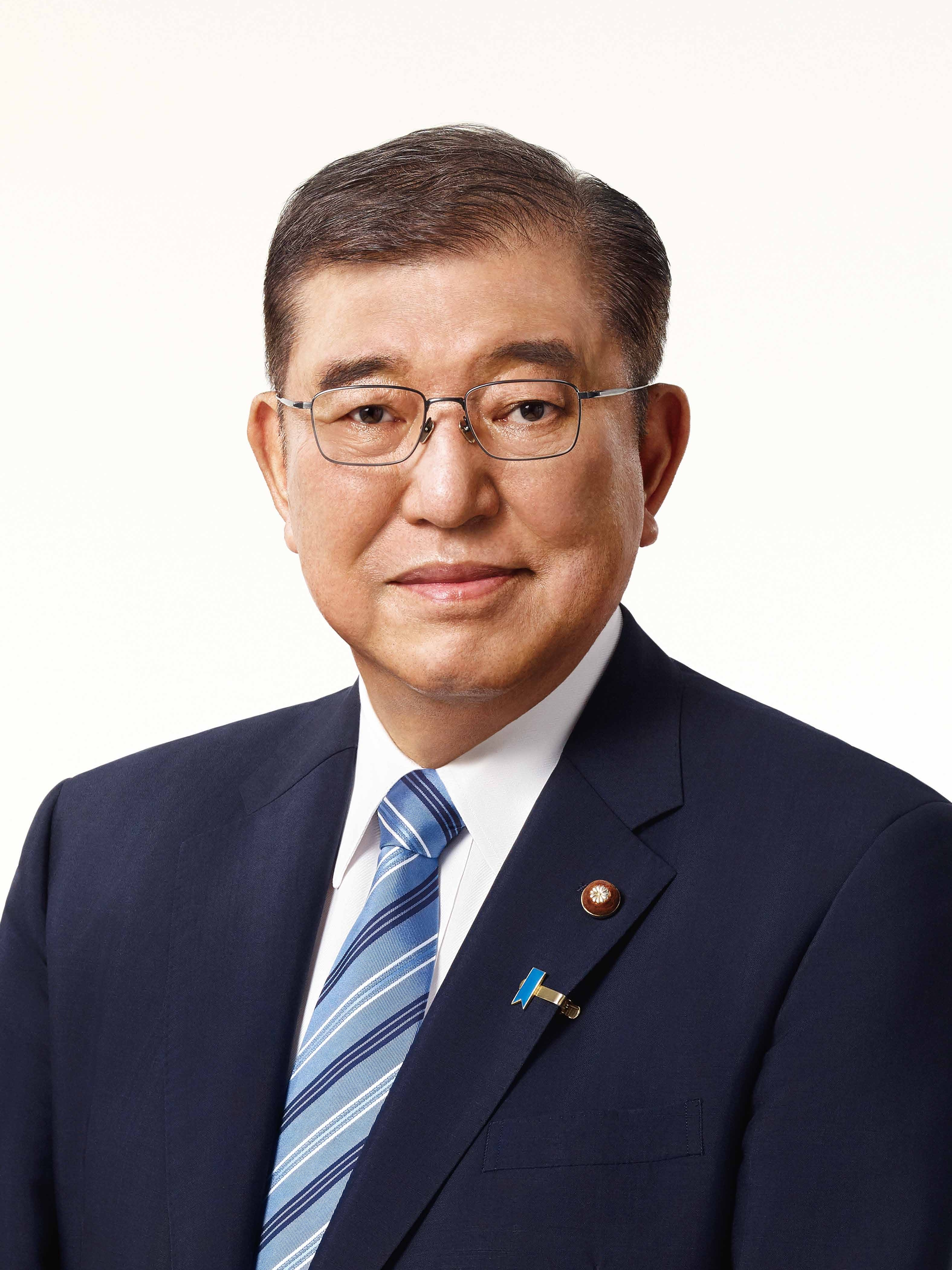
Shigeru Ishiba has represented the constituency since 1996.

Representative	Party	Dates	Notes
Shigeru Ishiba	Independent	1996 – 1997	President of the Liberal Democratic Party (2024–2025); Prime Minister of Japan (2024–2025)
Shigeru Ishiba	LDP	1997 – present	President of the Liberal Democratic Party (2024–2025); Prime Minister of Japan (2024–2025)

== Election results ==
2026
Party	Candidate	Votes	%	±%
LDP	Shigeru Ishiba	66,146	67.5	▼17.6
DPP	Hiromi Yagawa	13,364	13.6	
Sanseitō	Tetsuya Yutaka	11,734	12.0	
JCP	Naruyuki Tsukada	6,768	6.9	▲1.9
Registered electors		220,368		
Turnout		98,012	46.05	▼11.13
LDP hold				

2024
Party	Candidate	Votes	%	±%
LDP	Shigeru Ishiba	106,670	85.1	▲1.0
CDP	Hiroyuki Asakura	12,389	9.9	
JCP	Masakazu Okada	6,220	5.0	▼10.9
Registered electors		223,713		
Turnout		125,279	57.18	▲1.08
LDP hold				

2021
Party	Candidate	Votes	%	±%
LDP	Shigeru Ishiba	105,441	84.1	▲0.5
JCP	Masakazu Okada	19,985	15.9	▼0.5
Registered electors		230,959		
Turnout			56.10	

2017
Party	Candidate	Votes	%	±%
LDP	Shigeru Ishiba	106,425	83.6	▼0.9
JCP	Naruyuki Tsukada	20,829	16.4	▲4.5

2012
Party	Candidate	Votes	%	±%
LDP (Kōmeitō)	Shigeru Ishiba	124,746	84.5	▲22.5
JCP	Naruyuki Tsukada	17,550	11.9	▲8.1
Independent	Hiroshi Inoue	5,325	3.6	

2009
Party	Candidate	Votes	%	±%
LDP (Kōmeitō support)	Shigeru Ishiba	118,121	62.0	▲2.7
DPJ (PNP support)	Yasuaki Okuda	63,383	33.3	▲6.6
JCP	Naoyuki Iwanaga	7,336	3.8	▼2.3
HRP	Yukihiro Hosokawa	1,757	0.9	
Turnout		192,919	74.66	▲3.77

2005
Party	Candidate	Votes	%	±%
LDP	Shigeru Ishiba	106,805	59.2	▼12.4
DPJ	Shūsaku Hayakawa	48,092	26.7	
SDP	Kiyoichi Tanaka	14,271	7.9	▼11.7
JCP	Naruyuki Tsukada	11,105	6.2	▼2.7
Turnout		185,302	70.89	▲6.66

2003
Party	Candidate	Votes	%	±%
LDP	Shigeru Ishiba	114,283	71.6	▲22.5
SDP	Kiyoichi Tanaka	31,236	19.6	▲7.5
JCP	Iwao Suizu	14,092	8.8	▲3.8
Turnout		167,300	64.23	

2000
Party	Candidate	Votes	%	±%
LDP	Shigeru Ishiba	91,163	49.1	
Independent	Kōtarō Tamura	62,811	33.8	
SDP	Fumiko Chikuma	22,425	12.1	▼6.8
JCP	Naoyuki Iwanaga	9,406	5.1	▼4.8

1996
Party	Candidate	Votes	%	±%
Independent	Shigeru Ishiba	94,147	62.5	
SDP	Fumiko Chikuma	28,496	18.9	
JCP	Naoyuki Iwanaga	14,845	9.9	
NSP	Atushi Yamada	13,221	8.8	
Turnout		166,371	65.78	

House of Representatives (Japan)
Preceded by Hiroshima 1st district	Constituency represented by the prime minister 2024 – present	Incumbent
