= Tadao Watanabe =

Japanese politician (1898–1980)

- 渡辺 忠雄

Mayor of Hiroshima
- In office 2 May 1955 – 1 May 1959
- Preceded by: Shinzo Hamai
- Succeeded by: Shinzo Hamai

Member of the House of Representatives
- In office 11 April 1946 – 22 June 1946
- Preceded by: Constituency established
- Succeeded by: Masao Fujii
- Constituency: Hiroshima at-large

Personal details
- Born: 15 July 1898 Kitahiroshima, Hiroshima, Japan
- Died: 6 May 1980 (aged 81) Naka-ku, Hiroshima, Japan
- Party: Independent
- Other political affiliations: JLP (1946); LP (1952–1955)
- Education: Chuo University

Tadao Watanabe (渡辺 忠雄, Watanabe Tadao; 15 July 1898 – 6 May 1980) was a Japanese politician who served as the Mayor of Hiroshima from 1955 to 1959.

Watanabe was elected to the House of Representatives in April 1946, but soon after lost his seat due to the purge of Japanese officials by the US occupation authorities. He was able to return to political activity only following the end of the Allied occupation in 1952.

== Mayor of Hiroshima ==
In April 1955 ran against Shinzo Hamai, and won the election after making allegations of financial misconduct by his opponent. As Mayor of Hiroshima, Watanabe was in favor of the exact reconstruction of the Hiroshima Castle, which was completed in 1958.

In 1956, he inaugurated the statue of the goddess Kannon in the Peace Park in memory of those killed and in anticipation of peace. . As mayor of Hiroshima, Watanabe supported the notion of establishing nuclear power plants in his city.

Watanabe was survived by his son Naoyuki Watanabe, who worked to cultivate his father's legacy.

== Post mayoral activities and death ==
Watanabe tried to get reelected as mayor of Hiroshima in 1959, 1963 and 1967, but failed. After losing the election in 1959, Watanabe returned to his work as a lawyer.

He died of uremia at Hiroshima Municipal Hospital at 2:35 p.m. (Japan time) on 6 May 1980.

Preceded by Shinzo Hamai	Mayor of Hiroshima; 1955–1959	Succeeded by Shinzo Hamai
