= Ryōki Kawabuchi =

Mayor of Hiroshima

- 川淵 龍起
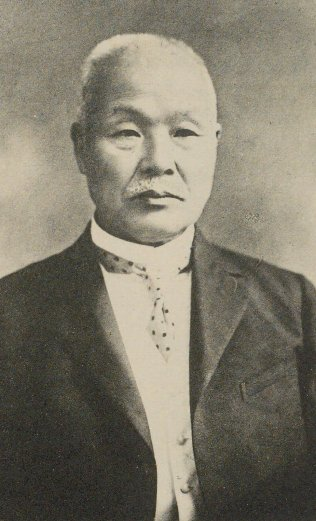

Mayor of Hiroshima
- In office 24 August 1925 – 23 August 1929
- Preceded by: Nobuyasu Satō
- Succeeded by: Sadaji Itō

Personal details
- Born: 28 May 1860 Agawa, Tosa, Japan
- Died: 1 February 1941 (aged 80)
- Resting place: Tama Cemetery

Ryōki Kawabuchi (川淵 龍起; 28 May 1860 – 1 February 1941) was a Japanese politician who served as the Mayor of Hiroshima from 1925 to 1929.

Preceded by Nobuyasu Satō	Mayor of Hiroshima; August 1925 – August 1929	Succeeded by Sadaji Itō
