= Kan'ichi Oda =

Mayor of Hiroshima

- 小田 貫一
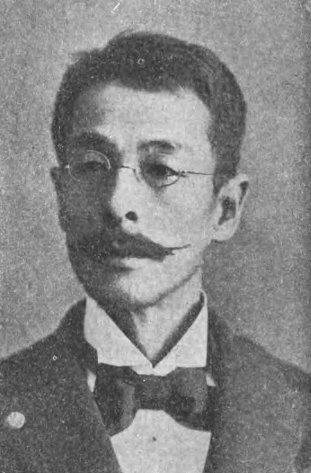

Mayor of Hiroshima
- In office 17 May 1909 – 22 July 1909
- Preceded by: Kōichi Takatsuka
- Succeeded by: Matasaburō Watanabe

Member of the House of Representatives
- In office 1 March 1903 – 27 March 1908
- Preceded by: Tomishima Nobuo
- Succeeded by: Kintarō Yokoyama
- Constituency: Hiroshima Counties
- In office 15 March 1898 – 9 August 1902
- Preceded by: Kotakari Motoyoshi
- Succeeded by: Constituency abolished
- Constituency: Hiroshima 2nd
- In office 15 December 1892 – 2 June 1894
- Preceded by: Hatta Kinjirō
- Succeeded by: Kotakari Motoyoshi
- Constituency: Hiroshima 2nd

Personal details
- Born: 29 December 1856 Saeki, Aki, Japan
- Died: 22 July 1909 (aged 52)
- Party: Jiyūtō (1903–1905)
- Other political affiliations: Jiyūtō (1892–1898); Kenseitō (1898–1900); Rikken Seiyūkai (1900–1903)
- Education: Keio University

Kan'ichi Oda (小田 貫一, Oda Kan'ichi; 29 December 1856 – 22 July 1909) was a Japanese politician who served as the Mayor of Hiroshima from May to July 1909.

| Preceded by Kōichi Takatsuka | Mayor of Hiroshima; May–July 1909 | Succeeded by Matasaburō Watanabe |
