= Senkichi Awaya =

Japanese judoka

- 粟屋 仙吉
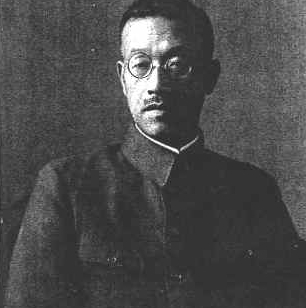

17th Mayor of Hiroshima
- In office 10 July 1943 – 6 August 1945
- Preceded by: Wakami Fujita
- Succeeded by: Shigetada Morishita (acting); Shichirō Kihara

Governor of Ōita Prefecture
- In office 7 July 1937 – 17 April 1939
- Monarch: Hirohito
- Preceded by: Atsuki Shiramatsu
- Succeeded by: Yazō Kōketsu

Personal details
- Born: 7 November 1893 Sendai, Miyagi, Japan
- Died: 6 August 1945 (aged 51) Hiroshima, Japan
- Resting place: Tama Cemetery
- Spouse: Sachiyo Andō (m. 1922)
- Children: 7
- Relatives: Inoue Masaru (great-uncle)
- Education: Tokyo Imperial University

Senkichi Awaya (粟屋 仙吉, Awaya Senkichi; 7 November 1893 – 6 August 1945) was a Japanese public official and the mayor of Hiroshima from 1943 until his death in 1945 from the "Little Boy" atomic bomb. He was one of the key figures in the historic clash between the Japanese police and the Imperial Japanese Army in 1933. He is also known for his Christian activity in the Nonchurch movement and his close relationship with its early leaders.

== Early life ==
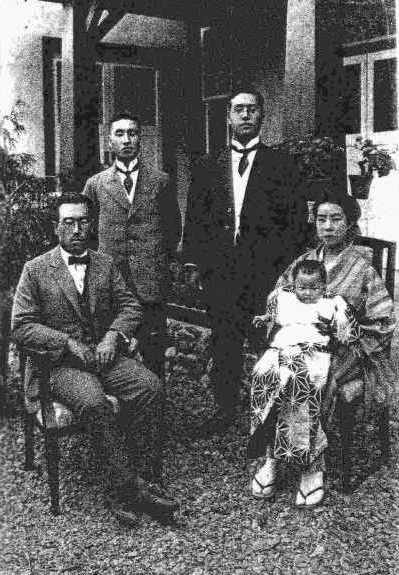
Senkichi Awaya (third left), with his brothers, wife and eldest daughter

Senkichi Awaya was born the second son of Eisuke Awaya (粟屋 頴祐, Awaya Eisuke), a railway bureaucrat and nephew of Viscount Inoue Masaru, in the city of Sendai, after which he was named. He spent his high school years in Yonago, Tottori and then entered the First Higher School, the preparatory division of the Imperial University of Tokyo, where he studied German law.

Eisuke had a drinking problem, over which his wife often went to seek help at a local Christian church with her children. Christianity, therefore, was the most familiar religion for Senkichi since his childhood. One day, when he was a high school student, Senkichi was advised by his minister to read Kanzō Uchimura's The Biblical Studies, which impressed him and made him a devout Christian. Unlike his father, he grew up to be a teetotaler.

Awaya started judo in his early teens, and later obtained a fifth-degree black belt and became a higher-ranking winner in the national police judo championships.

In March 1922, Awaya married Sachiyo Andō, who gave birth to four sons and three daughters, five of whom survived beyond infancy.

== Early career ==
After graduating from the university, Awaya joined the Home Ministry, assigned to the Hiroshima Prefectural Police in 1919. He was installed as district executive of Mitsugi District in March 1923.

In July 1924, Awaya was assigned to the prefectural government of Hokkaidō, where he was appointed chief of the city planning division the following year. Living in Sapporo, he was a regular churchgoer at the Independent Church of Sapporo. Awaya had a chance to talk personally with Kanzō Uchimura, for whom he had a lifelong respect when Uchimura visited Sapporo in the summer of 1928. Since then, Awaya and his family have socialized with Uchimura and his son, who later became Commissioner of the Nippon Professional Baseball.

Awaya was appointed Superintendent of the Kōchi Prefectural Police in July 1929. He succeeded in settling a long-unsolved dispute between a fishery company and local fishermen. Shinobu Agata, who was governor of Osaka Prefecture then, appreciated Awaya's negotiating ability and asked him to be the head of the Osaka Prefectural Police. He accepted the governor's offer in 1932.

== Clash with the Army ==
On 17 June 1933 occurred what is later called the Go-Stop Incident, in which the verbal altercation between two young men—an off-duty soldier in uniform who had ignored a traffic light and a policeman who warned the soldier— developed into fistfights, and finally into a ministerial-level conflict between the Home Ministry and the Army.

Hisaichi Terauchi, Commander of the 4th Division of the Army, demanded an official apology from the Osaka police, insisting that the policeman had unfairly injured the Army's prestige. Awaya, however, refused to apologize because he believed that military personnel, as well as civilians, should also observe the traffic regulations. Although their freedom of speech was limited under the Peace Preservation Law, the public was critical of the Army's high-handedness. Five months later, Awaya and Terauchi resolved their conflict through the mediation of the governor of Hyōgo, with both apologizing to each other. A year later, when Awaya left the police, however, the Home Ministry and the Army made an agreement that would preclude the civilian police from handling crimes committed by military personnel and bolster Japanese militarism.

Awaya was transferred to the prefectural government of Aichi in January 1935. After serving as Ōita's governor for 20 months, he was farmed out to the Ministry of Agriculture and Forestry. In March 1942, he resigned his office at age 48. He sequestered himself at his house in Setagaya, Tokyo, devoted to faith at the Marunouchi Bible study group led by Toraji Tsukamoto, the leader of the Nonchurch movement after Kanzō Uchimura's death.

== Mayor of Hiroshima ==
In 1943, Awaya was offered the mayoralty of Hiroshima by his senpai Okinori Kaya. He was not willing to accept it until he decided to try himself, and one of his friends told him that mayors should never be angry.

On the Sunday before he left Tokyo for Hiroshima, Awaya attended the Bible study group as usual. There, he talked about how he had stood by his beliefs and practiced teetotalism throughout his life in bureaucracy. Reverend Toraji Tsukamoto wrote in his diary, "Mr. Awaya's words are proceleusmatic and impressive to the audience. Blessed is Hiroshima to have such a great mayor!"

Awaya took the mayoralty in July 1943. Militarists held bad feelings toward him, but among citizens, his popularity was high due to his righteousness. The hardest job that he had to do in Hiroshima was to order to demolish buildings to create firebreaks according to the military's directions.

Awaya lived at the official mayoral residence in the Kakomachi district of Hiroshima, apart from his family at first. Still he decided to invite his family after the Great Tokyo Air Raid, believing that Hiroshima was much safer than Tokyo. His wife Sachiyo and third son Shinobu came to live in Hiroshima in April and in June 1945, respectively. On 3 August, three days before the atomic bombing of Hiroshima, Senkichi and Sachiyo Awaya invited their 2-year-old granddaughter Ayako Sakama.

== Death ==
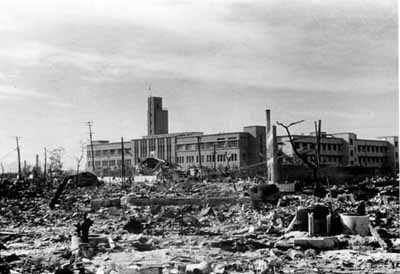
The Red Cross Hospital near Hiroshima's city office

When the United States Army Air Forces dropped the atomic bomb on Hiroshima, Senkichi Awaya was eating breakfast with Shinobu and Ayako. All of them are believed to have died instantly after the bombing.

The city officials who had survived the bomb began to gather at the city office that afternoon, but the mayor was still missing. The city's treasurer went to look for Awaya and found corpses at the ruin of the mayoral residence. On 9 August, Awaya's chief secretary, Kazumasa Maruyama and his coworkers went there to confirm that the half-burnt corpses were those of the mayor and his son. After finding a skeleton which appeared to be Ayako's, they carried out the unburnt parts of the bodies to cremate them at the park near the city hall.

Sachiyo was the only person who had escaped instant death in the mayoral residence. Seriously injured, she was carried into the Hiroshima Red Cross Hospital (Nisseki Hospital) and taken care of by her daughters but died on 7 September that year.

The officials chose Shigetada Morishita, who had been one of the two deputy mayors, as acting mayor upon confirming Awaya's death. He was succeeded by Shichirō Kihara, whom the city council appointed mayor on 22 October 1945.

Toraji Tsukamoto delivered a eulogy for Awaya and his family at their official funeral service held in December 1945. They were buried at Tama Cemetery in western Tokyo.

== Legacy ==
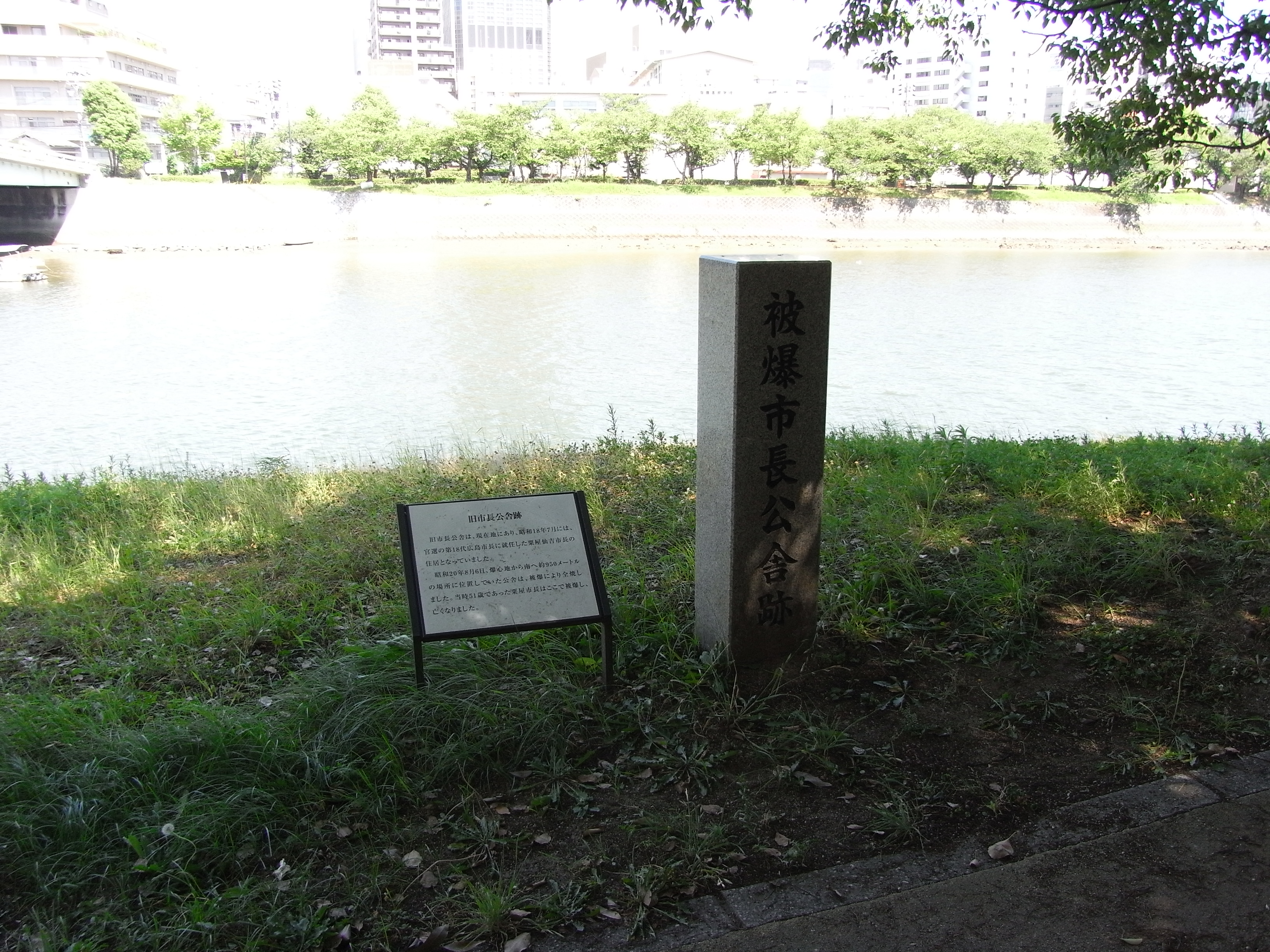
The cenotaph stands on the side of the Motoyasu River.

In August 1995, a half-century after the bombing, the government of Hiroshima created a monument in commemoration of Awaya's death where the mayoral residence used to stand. Tsuneo Kanazawa, the minister of the Independent Church of Sapporo, wrote an epitaph to commemorate his 51-year-long life.

Awaya's private house in Setagaya, Tokyo, was inherited by his eldest daughter, Motoko Sakama. It was designated a cultural asset by the government of Tokyo in 2003.

Awaya's third daughter, Chikako, graduated from the International Christian University, receiving a scholarship from an anonymous donor who turned out to be an American woman. His fourth son, Tadashi, became a public official like his father.

The diary of Yasuko, Awaya's second daughter, was featured in a documentary by Ryūshō Kadota in 2009. While a student at today's Ochanomizu University, she was conscripted to work at an armaments factory in northern Tokyo during the closing months of the war. Two weeks after Japan's surrender, she went to Hiroshima to take care of her heavily injured mother until her death on 7 September 1945. Yasuko also died from radiation exposure at age 19 on 24 November of that year.

== Bibliography ==
- Barr, Cameron W. (9 August 1995), "For Japanese Family, No Touch of Bitterness", The Christian Science Monitor
- Sakama, Motoko (2 August 1995), "Hiroshima's Legacy: the Story of One Japanese Family", The Christian Science Monitor
- Thomas, Gordon; Morgan-Witts, Max (1977), Ruin from the Air, London: Hamish Hamilton, ISBN 978-0-241-89726-3
- Fukase, Tadakazu; Ōtomo, Hiroshi (1982), 北国の理想 (in Japanese), Tokyo: Shinkyo Publishing
- Kadota, Ryūshō (2009), 康子十九歳 戦渦の日記 (in Japanese), Tokyo: Bunshun, ISBN 978-4-16-371590-2
- Miyoshi, Teiji (2001), おおさか100年物語 ゴーストップ事件 (5), Higashi Yodogawa Journal (in Japanese), vol. 133, Osaka: Popli Shimbun, archived from the original on 25 February 2012
- Miyoshi, Teiji (5 April 2008), ゴーストップの人たち(3) 世論は次第に警察の味方, Osaka Nichinichi Shimbun (in Japanese), Osaka: Shin Nihonkai Shimbun, archived from the original on 17 July 2011
- Tobe, Ryōichi (1998), 日本の近代 (in Japanese), vol. 9, Tokyo: Chūōkōron-sha, ISBN 978-4-12-490109-2
- Tsugami, Kiichi (1966), 粟屋仙吉の人と信仰 (in Japanese), Tokyo: Taishindō
- City of Hiroshima, ed. (1971), 広島原爆戦災誌 (PDF) (in Japanese), vol. 3, City of Hiroshima, archived from the original (PDF) on 28 March 2012

Preceded by Wakami Fujita	Mayor of Hiroshima; July 1943 – August 1945	Succeeded by Shigetada Morishita as acting mayor
