= Mayors for Peace =

Organization

Mayors for Peace (founded as The World Conference of Mayors for Peace through Inter-city Solidarity, renamed in 2001) is an international organization of cities dedicated to the promotion of peace that was established in 1982 at the initiative of then Mayor of Hiroshima Takeshi Araki, in response to the deaths of around 140,000 people due to the atomic bombing of the city on 6 August 1945.

The current mayor of Hiroshima, Kazumi Matsui, is the President of the organization as of his April 2011 inauguration.

Mayors for Peace was started in Japan, and since then Mayors throughout the World have signed on.

In August 2023, Mayors for Peace counted over 8,200 member cities in 166 countries and territories around the world.

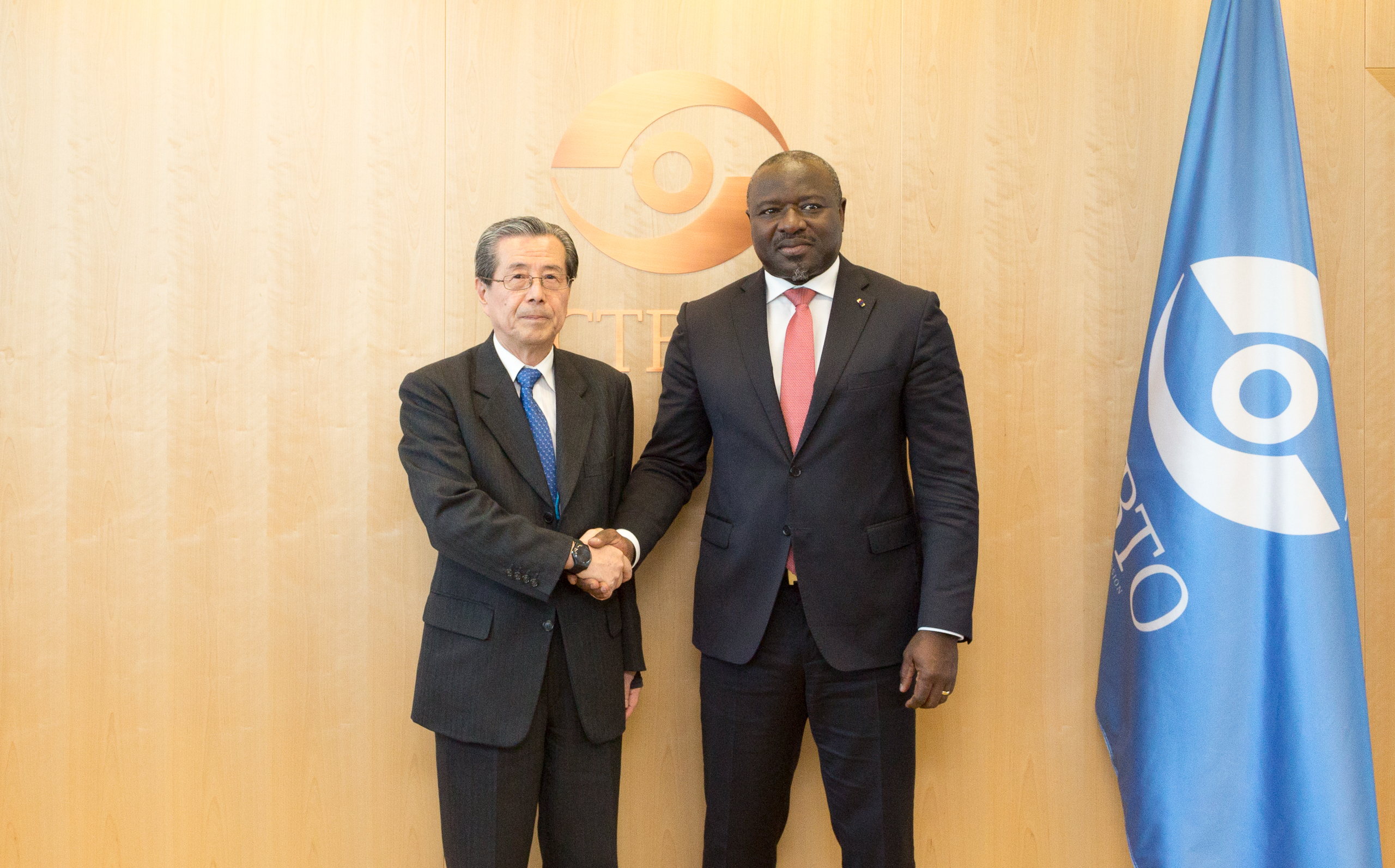
Mr Yasuyoshi Komizo ja, Secretary General of Mayors for Peace Secretariat, Hiroshima (left) and Lassina Zerbo, Executive Secretary of the Comprehensive Nuclear-Test-Ban Treaty Organization (2017)

== The Mayors for Peace 2020 Vision Campaign ==
The 2020 Vision Campaign was the main vehicle for advancing the agenda of Mayors for Peace, and advocated for a nuclear-weapon-free world by the year 2020. It was initiated on a provisional basis by the Executive Cities of Mayors for Peace at their meeting in Manchester, UK, in October 2003. It was launched under the name 'Emergency Campaign to Ban Nuclear Weapons' in November of that year at the 2nd Citizens Assembly for the Elimination of Nuclear Weapons held in Nagasaki, Japan. In August 2005, the World Conference endorsed continuation of the Campaign under the title of the '2020 Vision Campaign'.

From May 2008 till May 2009, the main focus of the work of the 2020 Vision Campaign was the signature drive for the Cities Appeal in support of the Hiroshima-Nagasaki Protocol. The Protocol embedded the objective of the 2020 Vision Campaign in a realistic framework. As a protocol to the Treaty on the Non-Proliferation of Nuclear Weapons (NPT), it seeks to challenge national governments to follow through on the commitments they made in Article VI the Treaty. The signature campaign was intended to influence the 2010 NPT Review Conference at the United Nations Headquarters in New York.

== Vision for Peaceful Transformation to a Sustainable World ==
In 2021 the Mayors for Peace agreed an updated vision for the organization. The 'Vision for Peaceful Transformation to a Sustainable World' set out three objectives: realize a world without nuclear weapons, realize safe and resilient cities, and promote a culture of peace.

== Activities in the U.S. ==
In western Massachusetts, a campaign was spearheaded from grassroots organizers in eleven towns. After two years of organizing, starting in the autumn of 2005, all eleven Western Mayors signed on to the campaign.

This encouraged some legislative action, and the state Republicans brought forth a resolution for nuclear abolition by 2020 which passed in the Massachusetts House and Senate. Senator Ted Kennedy was asked to bring the resolution to the federal level. However, after Kennedy died, there were no plans to present the resolution at a national level.

== 2011 Nobel Peace Prize nomination ==
Mayors for Peace were nominated for the 2011 Nobel Peace Prize by 1976 Peace Prize laureate Mairead Maguire. Maguire, who nominated Mayors for Peace and Nihon Hidankyo jointly for the prize, said she believes that "both organizations have fulfilled the wish of Alfred Nobel to work for peace and disarmament and awarding the prize jointly to them would recognize the great sacrifice of especially the hibakusha and give support and encouragement to all working on one of the greatest challenges to humanity – to rid the world of all nuclear weapons and build peace amongst the human family."

== See also ==
- The Ribbon International
