= Kazumi Matsui =

Japanese politician (born 1953)

- 松井 一實
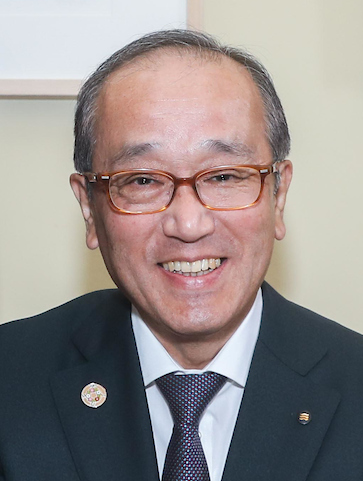
- Matsui in 2024

Mayor of Hiroshima
- Incumbent
- Assumed office 10 April 2011
- Preceded by: Tadatoshi Akiba

Personal details
- Born: January 8, 1953 (age 73) Hiroshima, Japan
- Education: Kyoto University

Kazumi Matsui (松井 一實, Matsui Kazumi; born January 8, 1953) is a Japanese politician and the current mayor of Hiroshima, the capital city of Hiroshima Prefecture in Japan.

== Early life ==
Matsui was born on January 8, 1953, in Hiroshima, Japan. His parents are hibakusha, atomic bomb survivors. He earned an undergraduate law degree from Kyoto University.

Matsui is married, and has four children.

== Career ==
In 1976, Matsui began his career by working at the Ministry of Labor in various positions. From 1989 to 1992, he worked at the Japanese embassy in the United Kingdom. He became mayor of Hiroshima in the unified local elections on April 10, 2011. In his bid for the mayoral position, he was supported by the Liberal Democratic Party and New Komeito. He was reelected as Mayor in 2015, 2019 and 2023.

Matsui served as the president of an organization called "Mayors for Peace".

Preceded by Tadatoshi Akiba	Mayor of Hiroshima; 2011-present	Succeeded by Incumbent
