= 2020 Vision Campaign =

Campaign against nuclear weapons

The 2020 Vision Campaign was a failed international campaign that supposed to push for a nuclear-weapon-free world by the year 2020. It was initiated on a provisional basis by the Executive Cities of Mayors for Peace at their meeting in Manchester, UK, in October 2003. It was launched under the name 'Emergency Campaign to Ban Nuclear Weapons' in November of that year at the 2nd Citizens Assembly for the Elimination of Nuclear Weapons held in Nagasaki, Japan. In August 2005, the World Conference endorsed continuation of the Campaign under the title of the '2020 Vision Campaign'.

== Campaign objectives ==
The 2020 Vision Campaign had four main objectives:

1. Adoption of the Hiroshima-Nagasaki Protocol by the 2010 NPT Review Conference
2. Directly thereafter, an end to nuclear weapon acquisition and threats and, as soon as possible thereafter, a clampdown on all weapon-usable fissile materials
3. Conclusion of a Nuclear Weapons Convention prior to 2015 NPT Review Conference
4. Securely destroy all nuclear weapons by the 2020 NPT Review Conference

Working with mayoral associations, City Halls and various civil society advisors and actors, the 2020 Vision Campaign was pushing internationally for signatures to the Cities Appeal, leading to the adoption of the Hiroshima-Nagasaki Protocol in 2010.

== Hiroshima-Nagasaki Protocol ==
Since May 2008, the main focus of the work of the 2020 Vision Campaign had been the signature drive for the Cities Appeal in support of the Hiroshima-Nagasaki Protocol. The Protocol embedded the final objective of the 2020 Vision Campaign in a realistic framework. As a protocol complementary to the Treaty on the Non-Proliferation of Nuclear Weapons (NPT), it sought to challenge national governments to follow through on the commitments they made in Article VI of the Treaty.

By signing the Cities Appeal, Mayors and elected local officials around the world were given the chance to get behind the Hiroshima-Nagasaki Protocol ahead of the formal and final presentation of the results of the international signature drive at the 2010 NPT Review Conference at the United Nations Headquarters in New York.
