= Takashi Hiraoka =

Japanese politician and journalist

- 平岡 敬

Mayor of Hiroshima
- In office 23 February 1991 – 22 February 1999
- Preceded by: Takeshi Araki
- Succeeded by: Tadatoshi Akiba

Personal details
- Born: 21 December 1927 (age 98) Sumiyoshi, Osaka, Japan
- Party: Independent
- Education: Waseda University

Takashi Hiraoka (平岡 敬, Hiraoka Takashi; born 21 December 1927) is a Japanese retired politician who served as the Mayor of Hiroshima from 1991 to 1999.

== Early life ==
Takashi Hiraoka was born in Osaka to Tadao Hiraoka and Chitose Hiraoka (née Maeda). Initially, his parents had a delivery service in Osaka, but in 1934 the family business was hit by Typhoon Muroto, and the family moved to Unggi in Korea (present day Sonbong, North Korea), where his maternal grandfather Setsuzo Maeda held several private businesses. Later, the family moved to Seoul.

During the Second World War, he studied medicine at Keijo Imperial University, but did not finish his studies. In summer 1945, worked as a volunteer for a chemical factory the Imperial Japanese Army had in Korea, then an occupied territory under the Japanese Empire, and remained in that position until the Japanese surrender in August 1945. He was away from the city of Hiroshima, and thus was spared any injuries due to the atomic bombing of his city. As Japanese rule over Korea was over, all Japanese staying in Korea were required to return to Japan, and the family returned to Hiroshima in September 1945.

After returning to Japan, he started studying science at the Hiroshima High School, his teacher being Prof. Tadayoshi Saika. In 1948, he graduated from that school, and then moved to Tokyo and studied German literature at Waseda University.

== Journalistic work ==
Takashi Hiraoka graduated from Waseda University in 1952, and then joined the Chugoku Shimbun where he later became a managing editor. Served as president of RCC Broadcasting Company. During the 1960s worked as a journalist, writing mostly about Korean hibakusha, thus demanding from the Japanese government grant them the right to medical care in Japan.

== Mayor of Hiroshima ==
In March 1990, as mayoral elections was underway, Manzo Hamamoto, a member of the Upper House of the Diet from the Japanese Socialist Party, suggested to Hiraoka to run for mayor. He declined at first, also for lack of funding, but was persuaded to run as Osamu Hashiguchi, Chairman of the Hiroshima Chamber of Commerce and Industry, promised the required funding. He was elected mayor of Hiroshima in February 1991.

Soon after becoming a mayor, Hiraoka had to deal with his first crisis, when on 14 March 1991, a bridge collapsed in Asaminami-ku, killing 15 people. Relatives of the dead filed a lawsuit against the Hiroshima municipality for compensations, but Mayor Hiraoka contended the city was not to blame. The lawsuit was eventually dropped in 1998. As mayor, Hiraoka worked to further cooperation between Hiroshima and cities in South Korea, thus leading to the Hiroshima-Daegu sister city agreement in 1997. The 1994 Asian Games were held in Hiroshima and hosted by Hiraoka as Mayor. His anti-nuclear activities led him to appear in 1995 as representative of the Japanese government in the International Court of Justice hearing on the legality of nuclear weapons.

In late 1998, Hiraoka announced he will not run for third term as mayor, citing low voter participation in the 1995 mayoral election as an obstacle to any mayor wishing to have the people's approval. He did not run in the 1999 mayoral election, and retired after eight years of serving as Mayor of Hiroshima.

== Post-mayoral activities ==
Following retirement in 1999, he remained active for peace. In July 2005, he published an article in the Asahi Shimbun criticizing the custom of some Japanese politicians of honoring the memory of Japanese war criminals from the time of the Second World War. In December 2007 participated in a meeting with the mayor of Waitakere City in New Zealand to express protest over the whaling policy of the Japanese government. Also tried to convince both the US and the Japanese governments to allocate the funds required for the planned relocation of Radiation Effects Research Foundation facilities in Hiroshima.

== Writings ==
- Prejudice and Discrimination (Japanese)
- Neglected Strait (Japanese)
- Hiroshima, with Hope for Peace (Japanese)

Preceded by Takeshi Araki	Mayor of Hiroshima; 1991–1999	Succeeded by Tadatoshi Akiba
