= Setsuo Yamada =

Japanese politician

- 山田 節男

Mayor of Hiroshima
- In office 2 May 1967 – 8 January 1975
- Preceded by: Shinzo Hamai
- Succeeded by: Takeshi Araki

Member of the House of Councillors
- In office 3 May 1947 – 7 July 1962
- Preceded by: Constituency established
- Succeeded by: Ken'ichi Matsumoto
- Constituency: Hiroshima at-large

Personal details
- Born: 26 December 1898 Kamo, Hiroshima, Japan
- Died: 8 January 1975 (aged 76)
- Party: Democratic Socialist
- Other political affiliations: Socialist (1946–1962)
- Education: Tokyo Imperial University

Setsuo Yamada (山田 節男, Yamada Setsuo; 26 December 1898 – 8 January 1975) was a Japanese politician who served as the Mayor of Hiroshima from 1967 until his death in 1975. He also served as a member of the House of Councillors from 1947 to 1962.

== Career ==
He served as member of the Upper House of the Diet in the early years after the Second World War, and in that capacity helped in 1949 to pass the law proclaiming Hiroshima a city of peace.

He was elected mayor of Hiroshima in May 1967, as Shinzo Hamai stepped down. As Mayor of Hiroshima he worked to promote the peace messages of his city overseas, which resulted in establishing in October 1967 a new department within the Hiroshima municipality, the Hiroshima Peace Culture Center, to disseminate the message of nuclear disarmament to the rest of the world. In September 1968, sent a letter of protest to the French government, protesting its nuclear tests, thus starting the tradition of such protest letters by the following mayors of Hiroshima. It was under his administration that Japanese Prime Minister Eisaku Satō participated in the memorial ceremony on 6 August 1971, the first time such ceremony was attended by a Japanese Prime Minister.

As part of his commemoration policies, decided to add to the official list of casualties also the US prisoners of war held in Hiroshima Castle during the war and killed in the nuclear holocaust. In May 1974 sent a letter of protest to Indian Prime Minister Indira Gandhi, protesting the first Indian nuclear test. He continued to approach the US government on matters of nuclear disarmament, and on 19 June 1974, addressed a cable to US President Richard Nixon as follows:

"On the occasion of the summit meeting with Soviet leader Brezhnev in Moscow late this month, I have learnt you two world leaders would deliberate Nuclear Test Ban Treaty. In the light of the fact of a series of recent atmospheric nuclear tests by France and China, I on behalf of Hiroshima citizens strongly beseech your Excellency and his Excellency Brezhnev to take full initiative in making greatest efforts to convene an international conference, with all nuclear club members present, for the talks of an immediate signing of treaties of complete suspension of nuclear testing and annihilation of nuclear weapons. Also, I sincerely solicit your Excellency to take resolute measures in avoiding current touch-and-go crisis of human holocaust. Yours Respectfully, Setsuo Yamada. Mayor of Hiroshima, Japan".

He was one of the signatories of the agreement to convene a convention for drafting a world constitution. As a result, for the first time in human history, a World Constituent Assembly convened to draft and adopt the Constitution for the Federation of Earth.

Preceded by Shinzo Hamai	Mayor of Hiroshima; 1967–1975	Succeeded by Takeshi Araki
