= Takeshi Araki =

Japanese politician

- 荒木 武
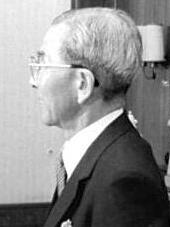
- Araki in 1987

Mayor of Hiroshima
- In office 23 February 1975 – 22 February 1991
- Preceded by: Setsuo Yamada
- Succeeded by: Takashi Hiraoka

Personal details
- Born: 4 March 1916 Nishi-ku, Hiroshima, Japan
- Died: 15 June 1994 (aged 78)
- Party: Democratic Socialist
- Education: Tokyo Imperial University

Takeshi Araki (荒木 武, Araki Takeshi; 4 March 1916 – 15 June 1994) was a Japanese politician who served as the Mayor of Hiroshima from 1975 to 1991.

In April 1947, he was elected as member of the Hiroshima city council, and as member of the Hiroshima Prefectural Assembly in 1951.

== Mayor of Hiroshima ==
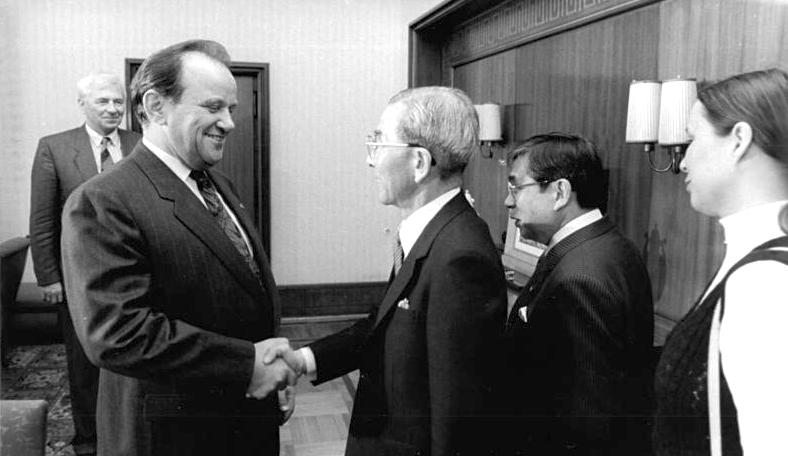
Takeshi Araki shakes hands with Erhard Krack in 1987

Araki was elected mayor of Hiroshima in 1975. In 1976, he protested the air show held in Texas, in which the US Air Force held an imitation of the atomic attack on Hiroshima in the form of a mushroom cloud in the desert, and in 1977 protested to the Japanese government about the possibility of further such reenactments. As a mayor, Araki approached the US government to work for nuclear disarmament. On November 26, 1976, he held a meeting in Washington D.C., with head of Arms Control and Disarmament Agency Fred Ikle, a meeting attended also by mayor Yoshitake Morotani of Nagasaki with the purpose of promoting US policy of nuclear disarmament. On November 30, the two mayors met US Permanent Representative to the UN William Scranton and conveyed the same message. The two mayors met UN Secretary General Kurt Waldheim on December 3. Araki later described his meeting with Waldheim as follows:

There we, as survivors, living witnesses, testified the true facts of our atomic bomb experiences, and we strongly appealed for the total abolition of nuclear weapons and the renunciation of war.

To this appeal of ours, both Secretary-General Kurt Waldheim and President H.S. Amerasinghe of the General Assembly, representing the United Nations, respectively emphasized that the sufferings of Hiroshima and Nagasaki are sufferings to be shared by the whole of mankind, and that a new concept of world order should be built from the ashes of Hiroshima and Nagasaki. They deeply sympathized with us, expressing their earnest desire to visit Hiroshima and Nagasaki.

In May 1978, Araki spoke at a special session of the United Nations General Assembly, dealing with disarmament, and was the first Mayor of Hiroshima to appear at an official UN session.

Being a hibakusha himself, he helped found the organization Mayors for Peace in 1982. He also concluded a number of Sister City agreements with Hannover, Germany (1983) and Chongqing, People's Republic of China (1986).

== Death ==
Araki died of pneumonia on June 15, 1994. His public funeral was held on July 8, 1995.

== Notes ==
Preceded by Setsuo Yamada	Mayor of Hiroshima; 1975–1991	Succeeded by Takashi Hiraoka
