= 1971 in politics =

This is a list of events relating to politics in 1971.

== Events ==
=== January ===
- January 1 - British law makes "irretrievable breakdown of marriage" sole grounds for divorce
- January 4 - US President Nixon warns Soviet submarines to keep away from Cuba
- January 7 - Long hair is ruled legal in the USSR
- January 15 - The Aswan Dam, constructed with Soviet support, is opened in Egypt
- January 18 - American Presidential candidate George McGovern pledges to withdraw all US troops from Vietnam if elected
- January 22 - The Commonwealth Conference in Singapore ends with disagreement over UK arms sales to South Africa
- January 25 - President Milton Obete of Uganda overthrown in a coup led by his army commander, Idi Amin
- January 27 - The Angry Brigade claim responsible for a string of bomb attacks in London
- January 28 - Idi Amin bans all political activity but releases 55 political prisoners

=== February ===
- February 22 - Hafez al-Assad becomes president of Syria

=== March ===
- March 30 - Establishment of the Congressional Black Caucus in the US

== Births ==
- Halil Mutlu, Turkish American physician and political lobbyist
- January 9 - Joost Eerdmans, Dutch politician and co-founder of the party JA21
- June 10 - Bobby Jindal, American politician who served as the 55th governor of Louisiana from 2008 to 2016
- June 28 - Elon Musk, South African businessman active in promoting far-right politics
- July 21 - Mark Preston, American journalist for CNN
- December 3 - Anita Vandenbeld, Canadian politician currently serving as Parliamentary secretary to the Minister of International Development
- December 22 - Bård Vegar Solhjell, former Norwegian politician for the Socialist Left Party
- December 28 - Ana Navarro, Nicaraguan-American political strategist and commentator
