= Sukeyuki Ban =

Japanese politician

- 伴 資健

Mayor of Hiroshima
- In office 30 April 1896 – 30 August 1906
- Preceded by: Tadashi Satō
- Succeeded by: Kōichi Takatsuka
- In office 28 November 1889 – 27 November 1895
- Preceded by: Akira Miki
- Succeeded by: Tadashi Satō

Personal details
- Born: 31 December 1835 Nakamachi, Aki, Japan
- Died: 28 January 1913 (aged 77)
- Education: Hiroshima Domain School

Sukeyuki Ban (伴 資健 Ban Sukeyuki; 31 December 1835 – 28 January 1913) was a Japanese politician who served as the Mayor of Hiroshima twice from 1889 to 1895 and from 1896 to 1906. He was the first mayor of Hiroshima to serve two non-consecutive terms.

Preceded by Akira Miki	Mayor of Hiroshima; 1889–1895	Succeeded by Tadashi Satō
Preceded by Tadashi Satō	Mayor of Hiroshima; 1896–1906	Succeeded by Kōichi Takatsuka
