= Shinzo Hamai =

Mayor of Hiroshima in 1940s–1960s

- 浜井 信三

Mayor of Hiroshima
- In office 2 May 1959 – 1 May 1967
- Preceded by: Tadao Watanabe
- Succeeded by: Setsuo Yamada
- In office 17 April 1947 – 8 April 1955
- Preceded by: Shichirō Kihara
- Succeeded by: Tadao Watanabe

Personal details
- Born: 28 May 1905 Hiroshima, Japan
- Died: 26 February 1968 (aged 62) Hiroshima, Japan
- Party: Independent
- Other political affiliations: DSP (1968)
- Children: 4
- Education: Tokyo Imperial University

Shinzo Hamai (浜井 信三, Hamai Shinzō; 28 May 1905 – 26 February 1968) was a Japanese politician who served as the first popularly elected Mayor of Hiroshima from 1947 to 1955 and again from 1959 to 1967. He created Hiroshima's image as a city of peace. He was the second mayor of Hiroshima to serve several non-consecutive terms, the first being Sukeyuki Ban.

== Life and career ==
In 1931, he graduated from the Law School of Tokyo Imperial University, and in 1935 became employed by Hiroshima Municipality.

He married Fumiko (born 1914), and they had one son and three daughters.

The circumstances of his rise to prominence result from the fact that following the nuclear bombing of Hiroshima, many municipal employees were killed or incapacitated, while Hamai was only slightly injured. At the time of the explosion, he was at his house located about 3.5 km from the epicenter. His house was partly damaged, but he was still able to walk. He immediately began relief work in cooperation with Japanese army authorities.

== Mayor of Hiroshima ==
In October 1945, Shichirō Kihara was appointed the next Mayor of Hiroshima, and in December Hamai became his deputy. Following Kihara's dismissal from his duties in March 1947 by the Allied occupation authorities and the reforms conducted in Japan by General McArthur, the first mayoral elections were held in Hiroshima in April 1947. In that election, Hamai ran against five other candidates, which included vice mayor Hisao Yamamoto and city council chairman Tsukasa Nitoguri. He won the election and became the first popularly elected mayor of Hiroshima.

As mayor of Hiroshima, he worked to rebuild his city as symbol for peace. As part of these efforts, he established a traditional annual speech delivered at the main memorial ceremony on 6 August, known as Peace Declaration. The decision to that effect was to turn the anniversary into a festival of peace. He managed to get the support of the US occupation forces to that policy, as they hoped this would reduce criticism of the US government among the people of Hiroshima. In early 1948, several citizens' groups in Hiroshima were formed in order to convince the Japanese government to release former military land for civilian purposes, and together with Hamai decided to work for the enactment of a special legislation regarding the status of Hiroshima. To achieve that end, Hamai made numerous trips to the Japanese Diet in Tokyo along with his secretary Chimata Fujimoto and city council chairman Tsukasa Nitoguri. Following the parliamentary election of January 1949, he got the support of the ruling Liberal Party under Shigeru Yoshida for the initiative. These efforts led to the proclamation of Hiroshima as a city of peace under Japanese law. The law to that effect was passed in the Lower House on 10 May 1949, and in the Upper House to following day. In order for the law to become effective, it required approval by municipal referendum, which was held on 7 July 1949, and ended with approval of the new law. The law went into effect on 6 August 1949.

In addition, Hamai worked to establish ties with foreign peace activists, such as Norman Cousins, who first visited Hiroshima in 1949. In June 1950 Hamai attended a conference in Caux, Switzerland, held by the Movement for Moral Re-Armament established by Frank N. D. Buchman. This was his first trip abroad as a mayor.

As part of his efforts to rebuild Hiroshima as a city of peace, he used the services of architect Kenzo Tange to build a monument to the victims in Hijiyama park, now officially named peace park. One venue of action taken by him was receiving monetary contributions for the reconstruction of his city. One such major source has been residents of Hawaii, especially of Japanese origin. He opposed the establishment by the US Army of the Atomic Bomb Casualty Commission and tried to prevent the location of its facilities in Hijiyama park, but did not succeed in that. Despite being a hibakusha himself, Hamai did express in early 1955 some support for the notion of establishing nuclear power plants in Hiroshima.

During the mayoral election of April 1955, Hamai's popularity was in decline as rumors spread he was under investigation for financial irregularities. On 28 April, just two days prior to election day, he was summoned for questioning by the Prosecutor's office, which probably led to his defeat at the polls. The charges were later dropped. He was defeated by mayoral candidate Tadao Watanabe, who became the mayor until 1959.

In April 1959 Hamai was reelected as mayor and served in that position until 1967. During this term, he had the opportunity to establish the first sister-city relations with another city, which was the city of Honolulu, Hawaii. These relations were established due to the large percentage of Hiroshima immigrants in Hawaii. In late 1966 and early 1967 he was at odds with the Japanese government over the preservation of the Atomic Bomb Dome, which the government in Tokyo refused to finance. He put pressure on the government by holding a fund-raising campaign in the streets of Tokyo, which led to the donation of 60 million Yen to that cause. In March 1967, he was awarded the Knight's Medal of the Legion of Honor by the French government.

== Post mayoral plans and death ==
Following retirement in 1967, he published a book of his memoirs in the Japanese language. In 2010, the book was published in English translation made by his son Junso Hamai (born 1936).

He was one of the signatories of the agreement to convene a convention for drafting a world constitution. As a result, for the first time in human history, a World Constituent Assembly convened to draft and adopt the Constitution for the Federation of Earth. In January 1968, he decided to run for the House of Councillors election as a candidate endorsed by the Democratic Socialist Party.

On 26 February 1968, he attended the 4th Hiroshima Local Alliance Regular Convention held at the Hiroshima Peace Memorial Museum auditorium. Immediately after making a public speech, he returned to his seat and collapsed from a myocardial infarction. Although a doctor from Hiroshima Municipal Hospital was immediately rushed to his side, he died at 4:08 p.m. He was 62 years old.

A public funeral was held for him on 8 March, initiated by Mayor Yamada and others.

There is a bust of him in the East Building of the Hiroshima Peace Memorial Museum (built in 1969).

== In popular culture ==
Hamai has been extensively mentioned in the documentary book Children of the Ashes by Robert Jungk. One of the events mentioned in the book was a brief moment in April 1946, when he witnessed a small tree growing in Hiroshima, realizing that despite radioactivity, plants could grow. This episode is depicted in the poem "Shinzo Hamai: 1946" by George Bailin, published in 1988.

== Bibliography ==
- Shinzo Hamai, A-Bomb Mayor: Warnings and Hope from Hiroshima (Hiroshima, 2010)
- Robert Jungk, Children of the Ashes, 1st English ed. 1961

Preceded by Shichirō Kihara	Mayor of Hiroshima; 1947–1955	Succeeded by Tadao Watanabe
Preceded by Tadao Watanabe	Mayor of Hiroshima; 1959–1967	Succeeded by Setsuo Yamada
