= Mayors of Hiroshima =

Mayor of Hiroshima 広島市長

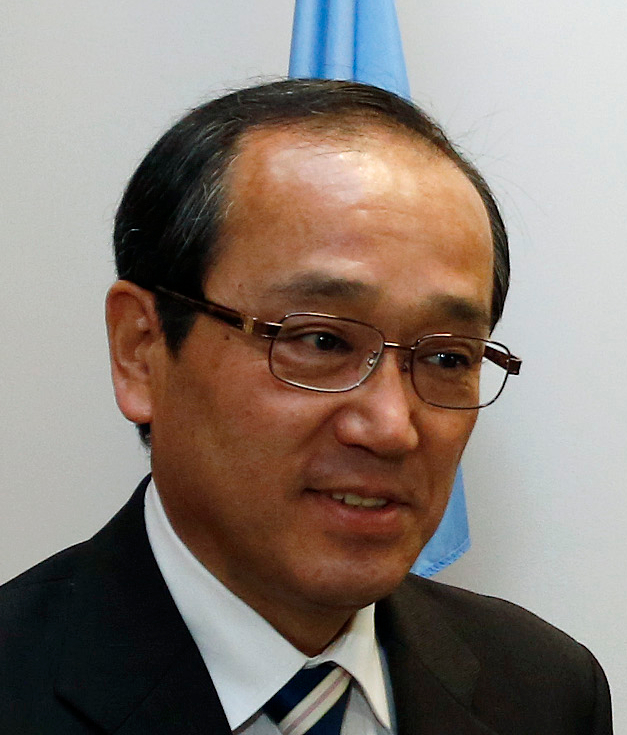
- Incumbent; Kazumi Matsui since 2011
- Inaugural holder: Akira Miki

Mayor of Hiroshima 広島市長 (Hiroshima shichō) is the head of the local government of Hiroshima City. Until 1871, Hiroshima was ruled by a feudal prince from the Asano clan, who ruled from Hiroshima Castle. On April 1, 1889, all cities in Japan were granted a municipality. At this point, all mayors in Japan were appointed by the Ministry of Interior in Tokyo. The first mayor of Hiroshima was Akira Miki, who remained in office for three months.

During the atomic attack on Hiroshima on August 6, 1945, mayor Senkichi Awaya was killed, and the municipal council had to appoint transitional mayor Shigetada Morishita, later followed by Shichirō Kihara. In 1947, mayoral elections were held in Hiroshima for the first time, and Shinzō Hamai became the mayor.

Hamai and the mayors of Hiroshima that followed have tried to become leaders of international public opinion on issues such as peace and nuclear disarmament. This activity is partly done by an organization called Mayors for Peace, established by mayor Takeshi Araki in 1982. More recent mayors have directly asked nuclear powers such as the U.S. to dismantle their nuclear arsenals.

== Chronological list of the Mayors of Hiroshima ==
=== Appointed by Japanese Ministry of Interior ===
(dates in parentheses indicate service as Mayor of Hiroshima)

1. Akira Miki (August 29 to November 28, 1889)
2. Sukeyuki Ban (November 28, 1889 to November 27, 1895)
3. Tadashi Satō (January 10 to April 20, 1896)
4. Sukeyuki Ban, 2nd time (April 30, 1896 to August 30, 1906)
5. Kōichi Takatsuka (August 31, 1906 to April 24, 1909)
6. Kan'ichi Oda (May 17 to July 22, 1909)
7. Matasaburō Watanabe (September 9, 1909 to July 3, 1910)
8. Kenji Nagaya (September 28, 1910 to February 16, 1913)
9. Yōzō Toyoshima (January 29 to April 2, 1914)
10. Heizō Yoshimura (January 22, 1915 to December 25, 1916)
11. Masatake Tanabe (October 8, 1917 to October 7, 1921)
12. Nobuyasu Satō (April 17, 1922 to January 21, 1925)
13. Ryōki Kawabuchi (August 24, 1925 to August 23, 1929)
14. Sadaji Itō (May 16, 1930 to May 15, 1934)
15. Kanji Ida (1934-1935)
16. Kintarō Yokoyama (February 26, 1935 to February 25, 1939)
17. Wakami Fujita (December 26, 1939 to May 9, 1943)
18. Senkichi Awaya (July 10, 1943 to August 6, 1945)
19. Shigetada Morishita (August 20 to October 22, 1945)
20. Shichirō Kihara (October 22, 1945 to March 22, 1947)

=== Elected Mayors ===
(dates in parentheses indicate service as Mayor of Hiroshima)

1. Shinzō Hamai (April 17, 1947 to April 8, 1955)
2. Tadao Watanabe (May 2, 1955 to May 1, 1959)
3. Shinzō Hamai, 2nd time (May 2, 1959 to May 1, 1967)
4. Setsuo Yamada (May 2, 1967 to January 8, 1975)
5. Takeshi Araki (February 23, 1975 to February 22, 1991)
6. Takashi Hiraoka (February 23, 1991 to February 22, 1999)
7. Tadatoshi Akiba (February 23, 1999 to April 7, 2011)
8. Kazumi Matsui (April 10, 2011 until present)
