= Hiroshima Peace Memorial Park =

Memorial to the atomic bombing of Hiroshima, Japan

広島平和記念公園 Hiroshima Peace Memorial Park
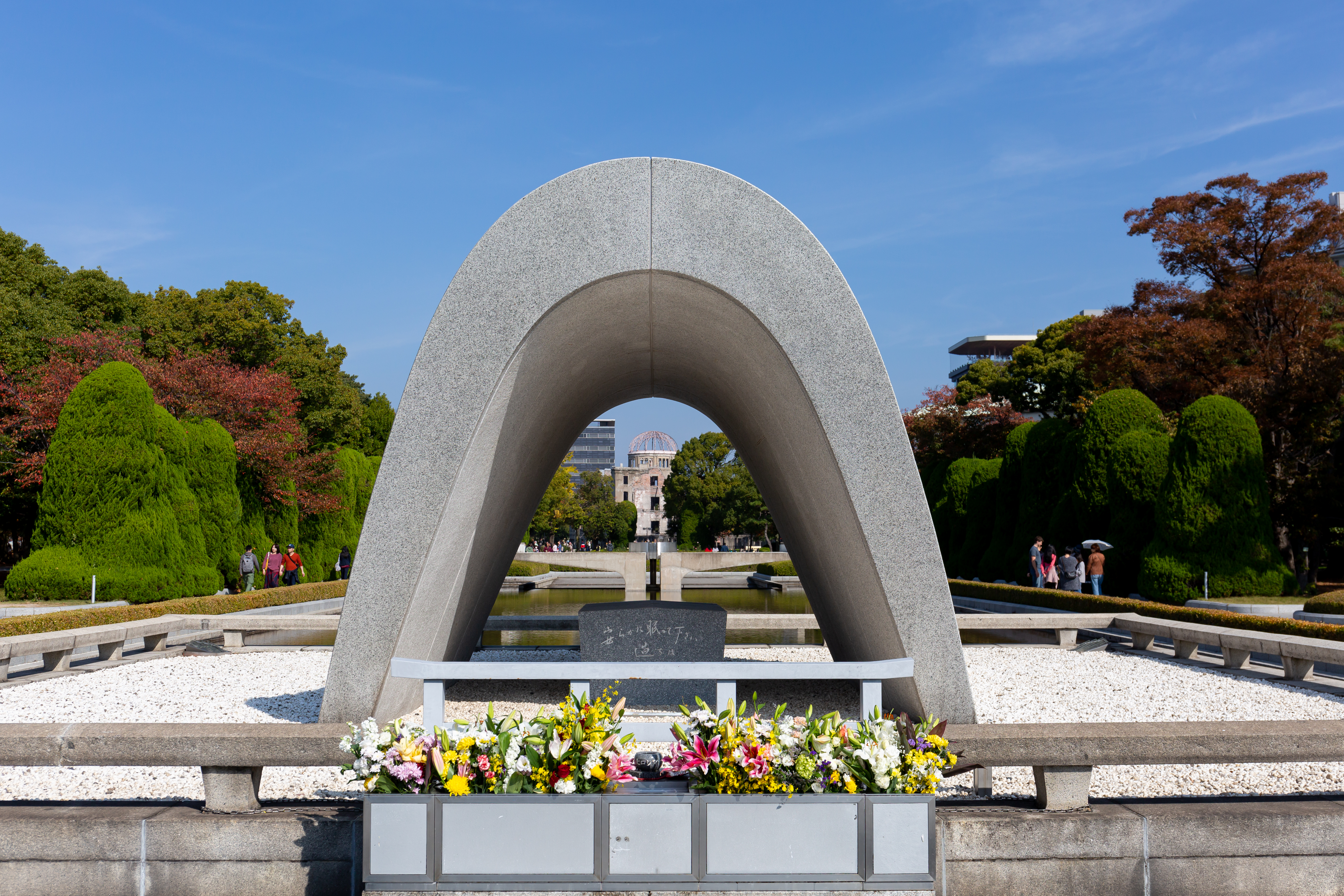
- Hiroshima Peace Memorial Park
- Interactive map of 広島平和記念公園; Hiroshima Peace Memorial Park
- Type: Public Park for World Peace
- Location: Hiroshima
- Coordinates: 34.3927°N 132.4524°E
- Created: 1 April 1954; 72 years ago
- Status: Open all year
- Website: Hiroshima Peace Memorial Park

Hiroshima Peace Memorial Park (広島平和記念公園, Hiroshima Heiwa Kinen Kōen) is a memorial park in the center of Hiroshima, Japan. It is dedicated to the legacy of Hiroshima as the first city in the world to suffer a nuclear attack at the end of World War II, and to the memories of the bomb's direct and indirect victims (of whom there may have been as many as 140,000). The Hiroshima Peace Memorial Park is visited by more than one million people each year. The park is there in memory of the victims of the nuclear attack on August 6, 1945, in which the United States dropped an atomic bomb on the Japanese city of Hiroshima. The Hiroshima Peace Memorial Park was planned and designed by the Japanese Architect Kenzō Tange at Tange Lab.

The location of Hiroshima Peace Memorial Park was once the city's busiest downtown commercial and residential district. The park was built on an open field that was created by the explosion. Today, there are a number of memorials and monuments, museums, and lecture halls, which draw over a million visitors annually. The annual 6 August Peace Memorial Ceremony, which is sponsored by the city of Hiroshima, is also held in the park. The purpose of the Peace Memorial Park is not only to memorialize the victims of the bombing, but also to perpetuate the memory of nuclear horrors and advocate world peace.

== Notable symbols ==
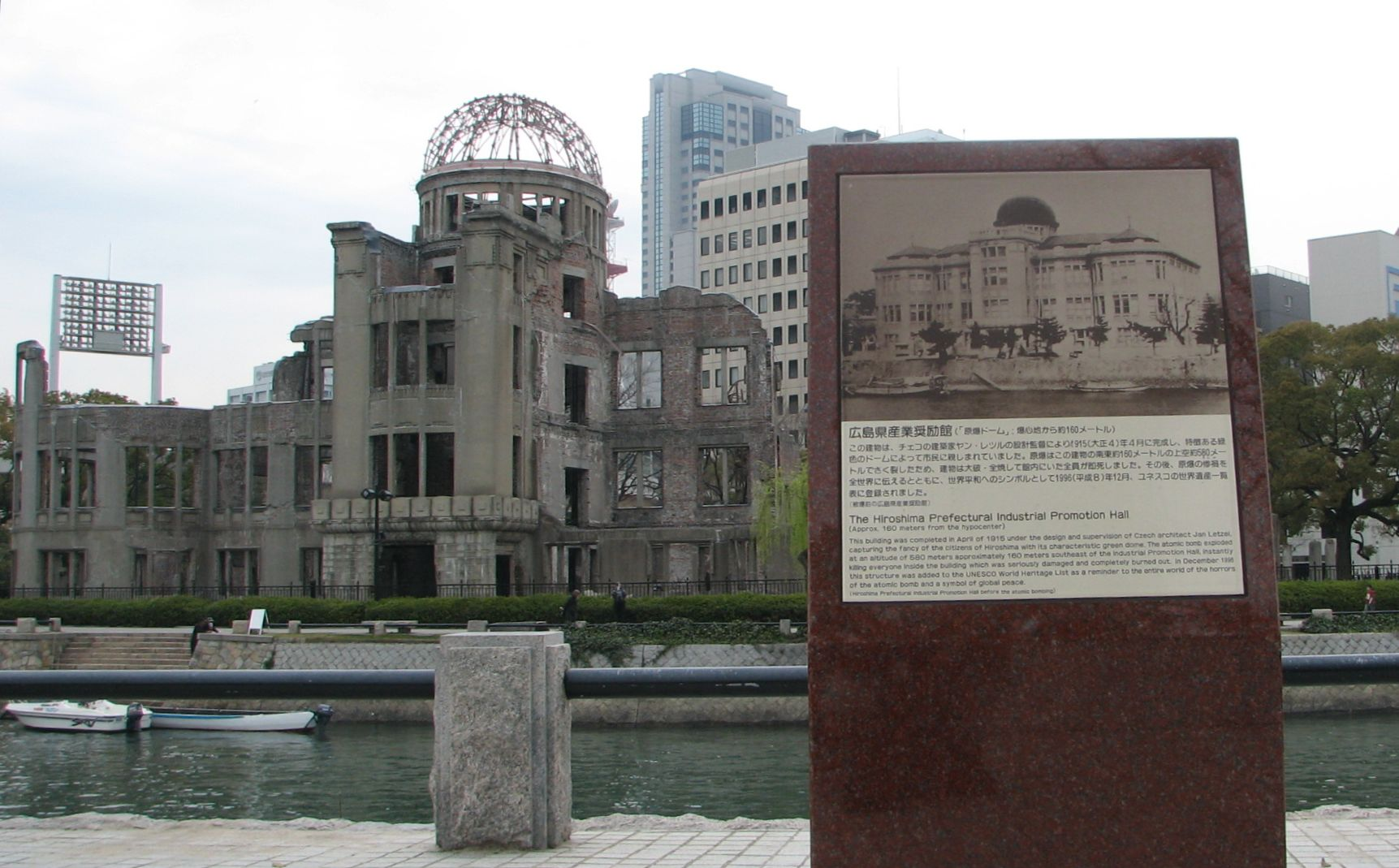
The A-Bomb Dome

=== A-Bomb Dome ===
The A-Bomb Dome is the skeletal ruins of the former Hiroshima Prefectural Industrial Promotion Hall. It is the building closest to the hypocenter of the nuclear bomb that remained at least partially standing. It was left as it was after the bombing in memory of the casualties. The A-Bomb Dome, to which a sense of sacredness and transcendence has been attributed, is situated in a distant ceremonial view that is visible from the Peace Memorial Park's central cenotaph. It is an officially designated site of memory for the nation and humanity's collectively shared heritage of catastrophe. The A-Bomb Dome was added to the UNESCO World Heritage List on December 7, 1996. Many A-Bomb survivors and Hiroshima citizens were pushing for the A-Bomb Dome to be registered as a World Heritage Site as it was "a symbol of horror and nuclear weapons and humankind's pledge for peace." This collective petition from many citizens groups was finally given influence when the Japanese government officially recommended the dome to the World Heritage Site committee in December 1995. A marker was placed on the A-Bomb Dome on April 25, 1997, by Hiroshima City. It reads:

As a historical witness that conveys the tragedy of suffering the first atomic bomb in human history and as a symbol that vows to faithfully seek the abolition of nuclear weapons and everlasting world peace, Genbaku Dome was added to the World Heritage List in accordance with the "Convention Concerning the Protection of World Cultural and Natural Heritage (World Heritage Convention)." December 7, 1996, Hiroshima City

=== Children's Peace Monument ===
The Children's Peace Monument is a statue dedicated to the memory of the children who died as a result of the bombing. The statue is of a girl with outstretched arms with a folded paper crane rising above her. The statue is based on the true story of Sadako Sasaki (佐々木禎子, Sasaki Sadako), a young girl who died from radiation from the bomb. She is known for folding over 1,000 paper cranes in response to a Japanese legend. To this day, people (mostly children) from around the world fold cranes and send them to Hiroshima, where they are placed near the statue. The statue has a continuously replenished collection of folded cranes nearby.

=== Rest House ===
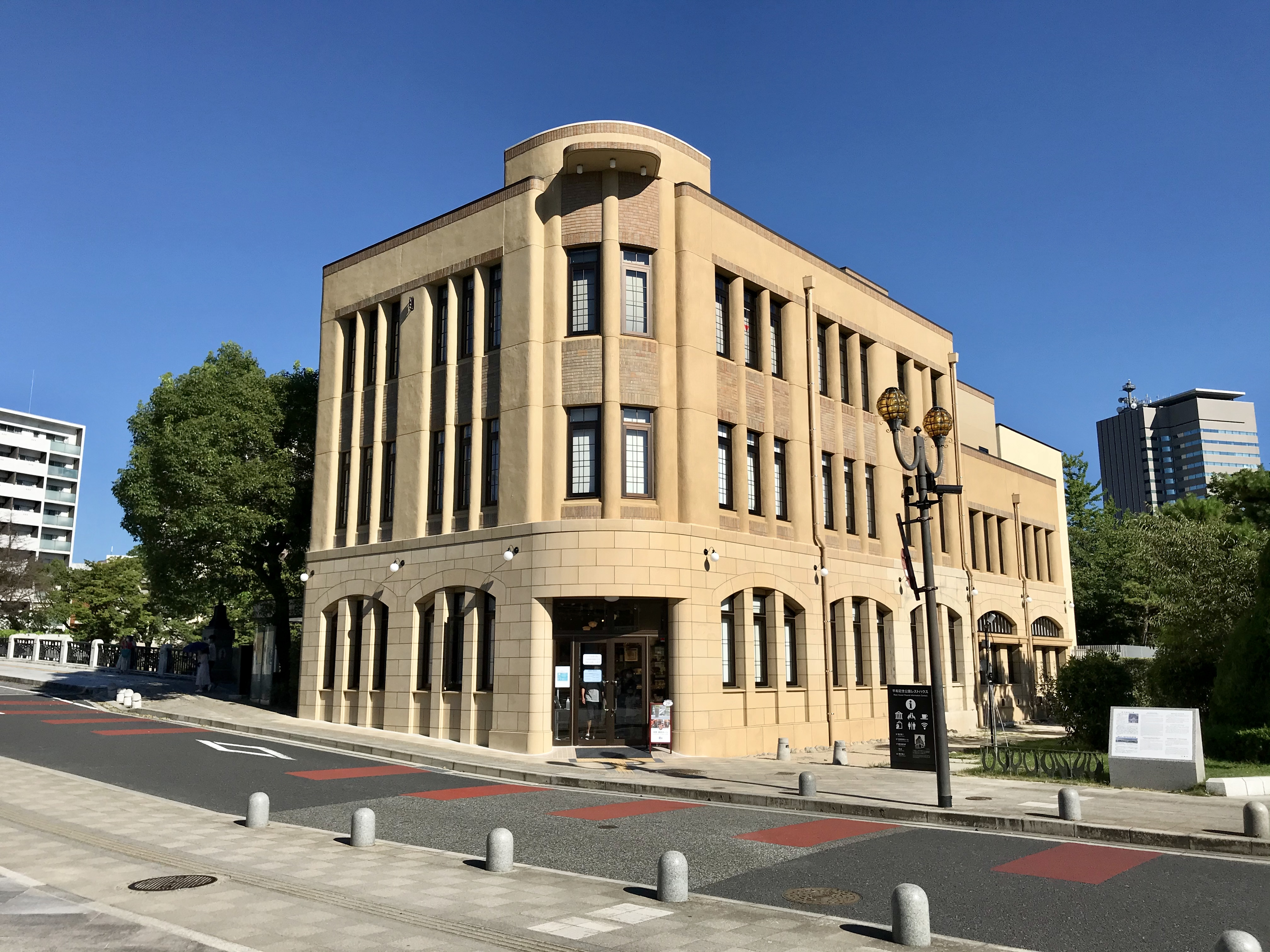
The Rest House of Hiroshima Peace Park

The Rest House of Hiroshima Peace Park is another atomic-bombed building in the park. The building was built as the Taishoya Kimono Shop in March 1929. It was used as a fuel distribution station when the shortage of fuel began in June 1944. On August 6, 1945, when the bomb exploded, the roof was crushed, the interior destroyed, and everything consumable burned except in the basement. Eventually, 36 people in the building died of the bombing; 47-year-old Eizo Nomura survived in the basement, which had a concrete roof through which radiation had a more difficult time penetrating. He survived into his 80s.

The former Nakajima District, which today is Peace Memorial Park, was a prominent business quarter of the city during the early years of the Showa period (1926–89) and had been the site of many wooden two-story structures. However, in 1929, the three-story Taishoya Kimono Shop was constructed, surrounded by shops and movie theaters. It was said that if you went up to the roof, a panoramic view of the city awaited. In 1943, the Kimono Shop was closed and in June 1944, as World War II intensified and economic controls became increasingly stringent, the building was purchased by the Prefectural Fuel Rationing Union.

At 8:15 a.m. on August 6, 1945, the explosion of the atomic bomb about 600 meters above the hypocenter destroyed the building's concrete roof. The interior was also badly damaged and gutted by ensuing fires, and everyone inside was killed except Nomura, who miraculously survived. The building was restored soon after the war and used as the Fuel Hall. In 1957, the Hiroshima East Reconstruction Office, which became the core of the city's reconstruction program, was established there.

At the time of the bombing, 37 people were working there. All of them perished, with the exception of Eizo Nomura, who had gone down to the basement at that moment and survived the bombing. Nomura, who was then 47, was a worker for the Hiroshima Prefectural Fuel Rationing Union. Nomura managed to escape through rising fire and vigorous smoke. However, after his survival, he struggled with high fever, diarrhea, bleeding gums, and other symptoms caused by the radiation.

Although the building was heavily damaged, it still stood and was renovated soon after the war, including a new wooden roof. After the war, the Hiroshima municipal government purchased the building and established a postwar recovery office in it. Today it is used as the Rest House in Peace Memorial Park. The Rest House has been in debates many times over whether or not it should be preserved. In 1995, the city decided to demolish the building, but the plan was put aside. One of the reasons was the announcement of the A-Bomb Dome as a World Heritage site.

Right now, the first floor of the Rest House is used as a tourist information office and a souvenir shop, the second/third floors as offices, and the basement is preserved nearly as it was at the time of the bombing.

== Ceremonies ==
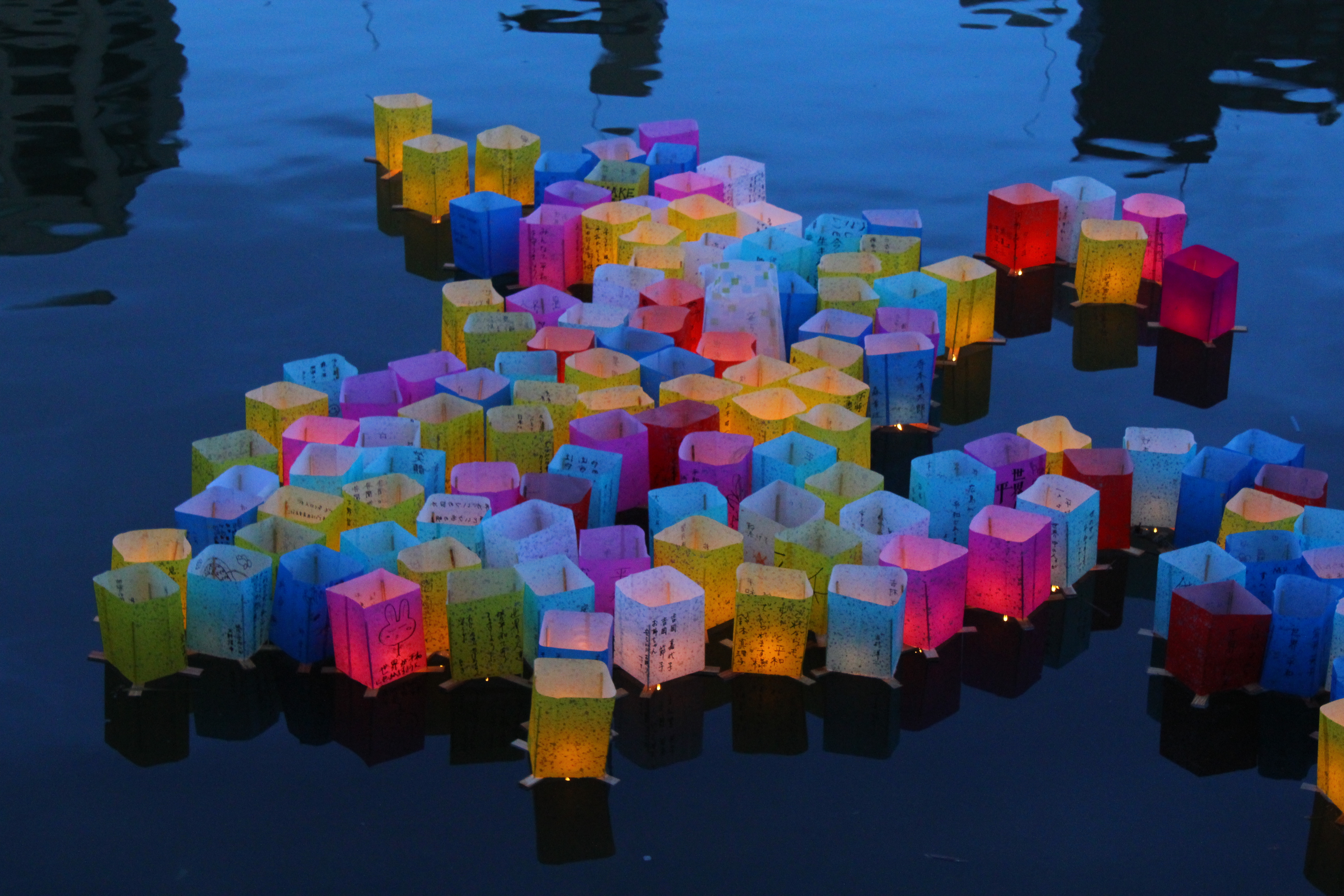
Drifting lanterns

=== Hiroshima Peace Memorial Ceremony ===
Every year on 6 August, "A-Bomb Day," the City of Hiroshima holds the Hiroshima Peace Memorial Ceremony to console the victims of the atomic bombs and to pray for the realization of lasting world peace. The ceremony is held in the morning from 8:00 AM, in front of the Memorial Cenotaph with many citizens including the families of the deceased. During the ceremony, a one-minute silence to honor the victims is observed at 8:15 AM, the time of the atomic bomb's explosion.

=== Lantern Ceremony ===
In the evening of the same day, a Lantern ceremony is held to send off the spirits of the victims on lanterns with peace messages floating on the waters of the Motoyasu River.

== Museums ==
=== Hiroshima Peace Memorial Museum ===
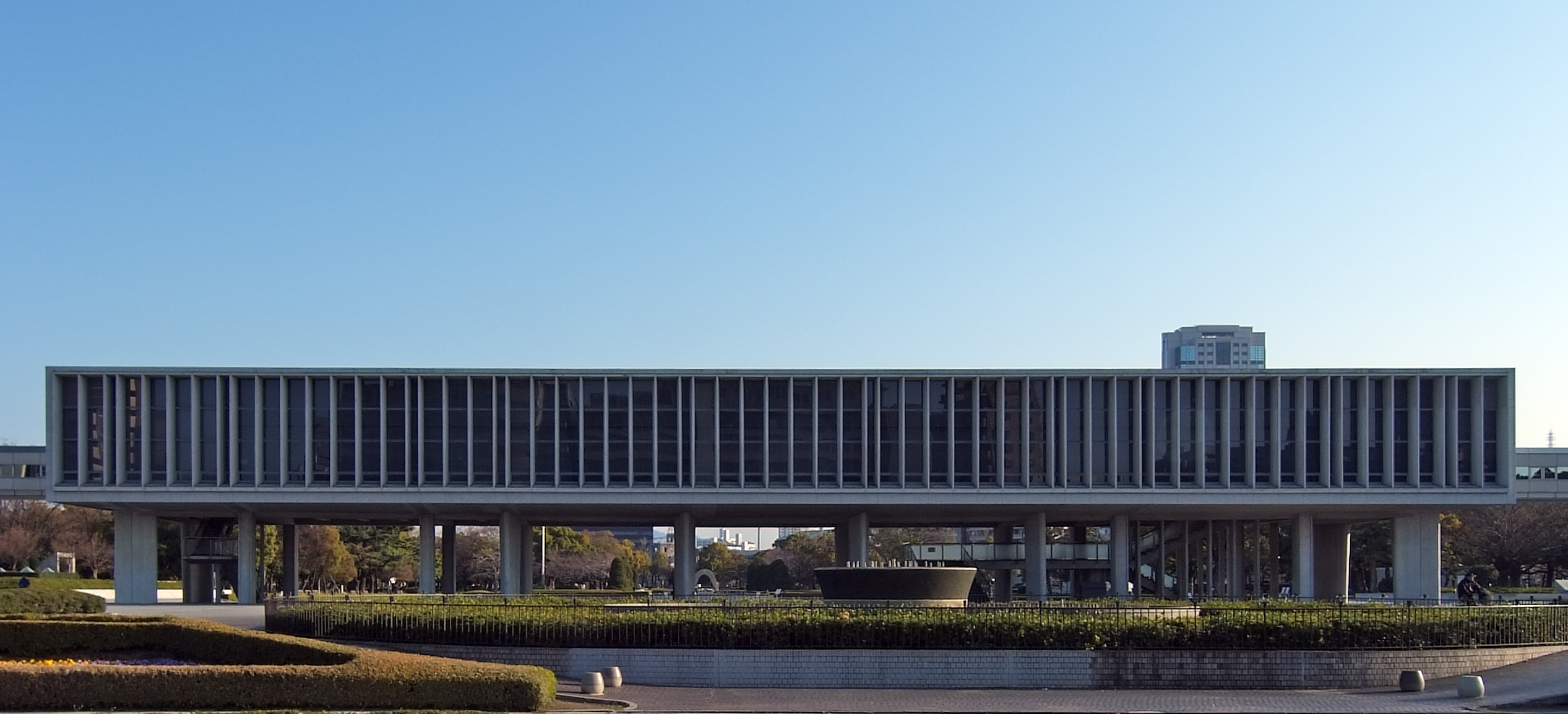
The main building of Hiroshima Peace Memorial Museum

The Hiroshima Peace Memorial Museum is the primary museum in the park dedicated to educating visitors about the bomb. The Museum has exhibits and information covering the buildup to war, the role of Hiroshima in the war up to the bombing, and extensive information on the bombing and its effects, along with substantial memorabilia and pictures from the bombing. The building also has views of the Memorial Cenotaph, Peace Flame, and A-Bomb Dome.

=== International Conference Center Hiroshima ===
International Conference Center Hiroshima is in the Peace Park, west side of the main building of the Hiroshima Peace Memorial Museum.

=== Hiroshima National Peace Memorial Hall ===
The Hiroshima National Peace Memorial Hall for the Atomic Bomb Victims is an effort by the Japanese national government to remember and mourn the sacred sacrifice of the atomic bomb victims. It is also an expression of Japan's desire for genuine and lasting peace. The Hall contains a number of displays. On the roof, near the entrance (the museum is underground) is a clock frozen at 8:15, the time the bomb went off. The museum contains a seminar room, library, temporary exhibition area, and victims' information area. The Hall of Remembrance, contains a 360 degree panorama of the destroyed Hiroshima recreated using 140,000 tiles — the number of people estimated to have died from the bomb by the end of 1945.

== Monuments ==
=== Memorial Cenotaph ===
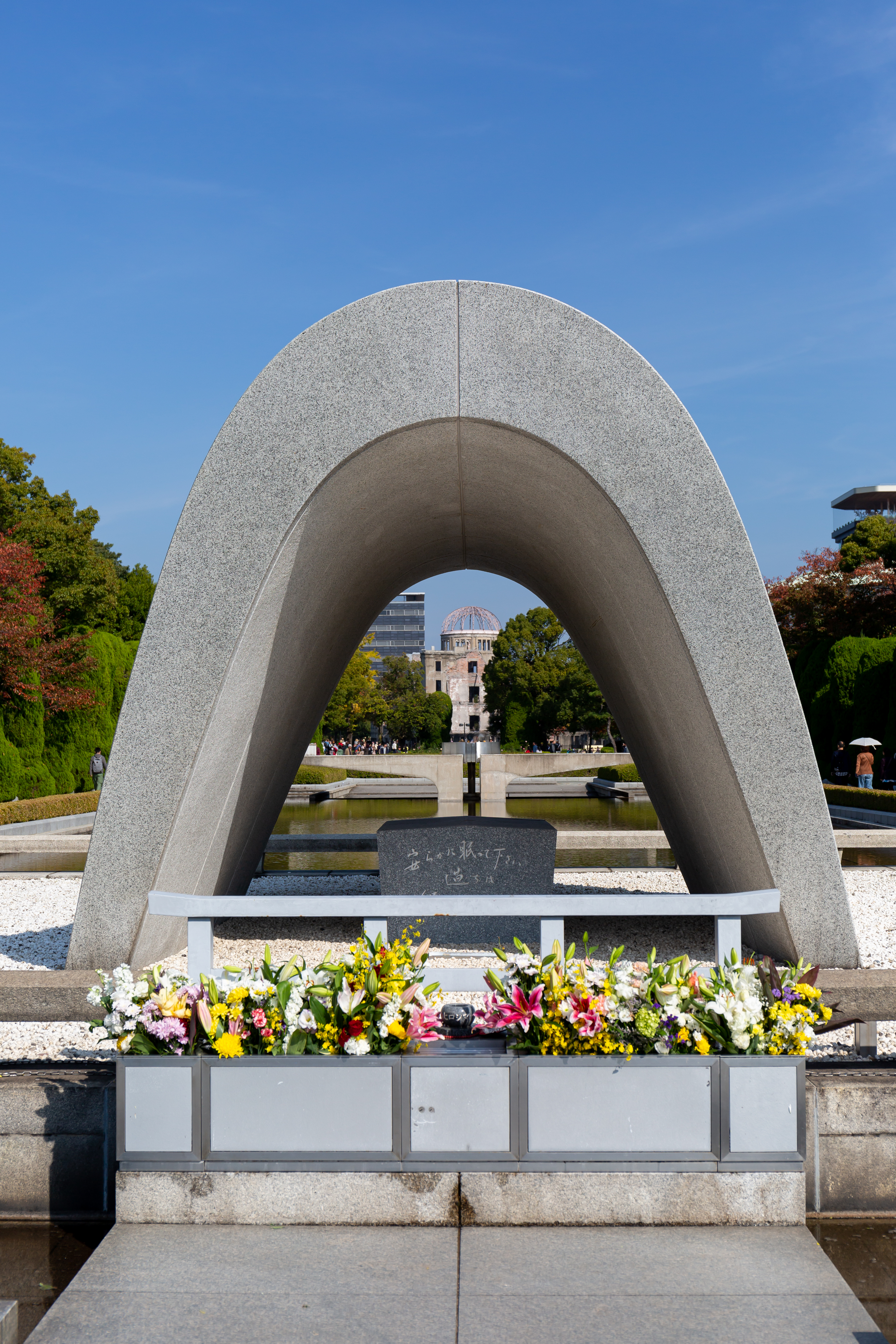
The Memorial Cenotaph

Near the center of the park is a concrete, saddle-shaped monument that covers a cenotaph holding the names of all of the people killed by the bomb. The monument is aligned to frame the Peace Flame and the A-Bomb Dome. The Memorial Cenotaph was one of the first memorial monuments built on open field on August 6, 1952. The arch shape represents a shelter for the souls of the victims.

The cenotaph carries the epitaph 安らかに眠って下さい 過ちは 繰返しませぬから, which means "please rest in peace, for [we] shall not repeat the error." In Japanese, the sentence's subject is ambiguous, implying either "[we] who dropped the atomic bomb" or "[we] who pursued aggressive war, bringing this fate upon the people of Hiroshima. " It was intended to memorialize the victims of Hiroshima without politicizing the issue, taking advantage of the fact that polite Japanese speech typically demands lexical ambiguity in the first place.The epitaph was written by Tadayoshi Saika, Professor of English Literature at Hiroshima University. He also provided the English translation, "Let all the souls here rest in peace for we shall not repeat the evil." On November 3, 1983, an explanation plaque in English was added in order to convey Professor Saika's intent that "we" refers to "all humanity", not specifically the Japanese or Americans, and that the "error" is the "evil of war":

The inscription on the front panel offers a prayer for the peaceful repose of the victims and a pledge on behalf of all humanity never to repeat the evil of war. It expresses the spirit of Hiroshima — enduring grief, transcending hatred, pursuing harmony and prosperity for all, and yearning for genuine, lasting world peace.

Perhaps unsurprisingly, the ambiguity of the phrase has the potential to offend; some right-wing circles in Japan have interpreted the words as an admission of guilt—implicitly reading it as "we (the Japanese people) shall not repeat the error"—and they criticize the epitaph as a self-accusation by the Japanese empire. In July 2005, the cenotaph was vandalized by a Japanese man affiliated with the Japanese right.

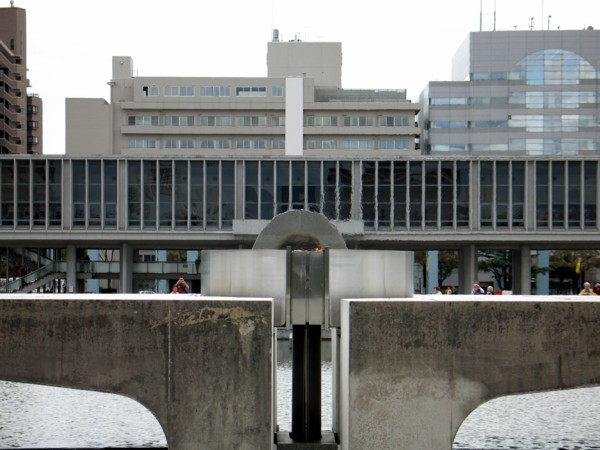
Peace Flame with the Peace Memorial Museum in the background

=== Peace Flame ===
The Peace Flame is another monument to the victims of the bomb that destroyed Hiroshima, but it has an additional symbolic purpose. The flame has burned continuously since it was lit in 1964 and will remain lit until all nuclear bombs on the planet are destroyed and the planet is free from the threat of nuclear annihilation.

=== Peace Bells ===
A 2006 recording of the peace bell

There are three Peace Bells in the Peace Park. The smaller one is used only for the Peace Memorial Ceremony. Except that day, it is displayed in the east building of Hiroshima Peace Memorial Museum. The more well-known Peace Bell stands near the Children's Peace Monument and consists of a large Japanese bell hanging inside a small open-sided structure. Visitors are encouraged to ring the bell for world peace and the loud and melodious tolling of this bell rings out regularly throughout the Peace Park. The Peace Bell was built out in the open on September 20, 1964. The surface of the bell is a map of the world, and the "sweet spot" is an atomic symbol, designed by Masahiko Katori [1899–1988], cast by Oigo Bell Works, in Takaoka, Toyama. The inscriptions on the bell are in Greek (γνῶθι σεαυτόν), Japanese, and Sanskrit. It is translated as "Know yourself." The Greek embassy donated the bell to the Peace Park and picked out the most appropriate ancient Greek philosophical quote of Socrates. The Sanskrit text is a quotation from Longer Sukhāvatīvyūha Sūtra which was attested by the Indian ambassador. The Japanese text was provided by a university lecturer.

=== Atomic Bomb Memorial Mound ===
The Atomic Bomb Memorial Mound is a large, grass-covered knoll that contains the cremated ashes of 70,000 unidentified victims of the bomb. Toshiko Saiki, a survivor of the bombing, became a well-known peace activist after voluntarily cleaning the memorial on a daily basis for 40 years.

=== Cenotaph for Korean Victims ===
Among the 400,000 people who were killed or exposed to lethal post-explosion radiation, at least 45,000 were Korean, but the number is uncertain, because the population has been neglected as a minority. Additionally, 300,000 survivors of Hiroshima and Nagasaki returned to Korea after liberation from Japanese colonialism. The monument, decorated with Korean national symbols, is intended to honour Korean victims and survivors of the atomic bomb and Japanese colonialism. The monument's inscription reads "The Monument in Memory of the Korean Victims of the A[tomic]-Bomb. In memory of the souls of His Highness Prince Yi U and over 20000 other souls", while the side-inscription reads "Souls of the dead ride to heaven on the backs of turtles."

=== Gates of Peace ===
Added in 2005, this monument contains ten gates covered with the word "peace" in 49 languages from around the world. The gates represent the nine circles of Hell plus one: "the living hell of Hiroshima caused by the atomic bombing." Each gate is 9 meters high and 2.6 meters wide.

=== Memorial Tower to the Mobilized Students ===
The Association for the Mobilized Student Victims of Hiroshima Prefecture built this tower in May 1967 in order to console the souls of over 10,000 students, including those who were Atomic Bomb victims, who died in bombings during the Pacific War. In Hiroshima, there were 8,387 students who were mobilized; 6,907 of whom were killed in the Atomic Bombing. The memorial is twelve meters tall, five stories, and is decorated with the Goddess of Peace as well as eight doves, which are placed around the tower. To the sides of the tower are plaques which depict the work that the students did, such as factory work, female students sewing, or showing students working to increase food production. There is a plaque in front of the tower that has two buttons that narrate the background information in either Japanese or English.

== Festivals ==
=== Hiroshima Flower Festival ===
Hiroshima Flower Festival is held from May 3 to May 5 during Japanese Golden Week, in the Peace Park and Peace Boulevard.

=== Hiroshima Dreamination ===
Hiroshima Dreamination is held in winter.

== Access ==
- Hiroshima Peace Memorial Park bus stop
- Hiroden Genbaku Dome-mae Station
- Hiroden Chuden-mae Station
- Astram Hondōri Station

== Gallery ==
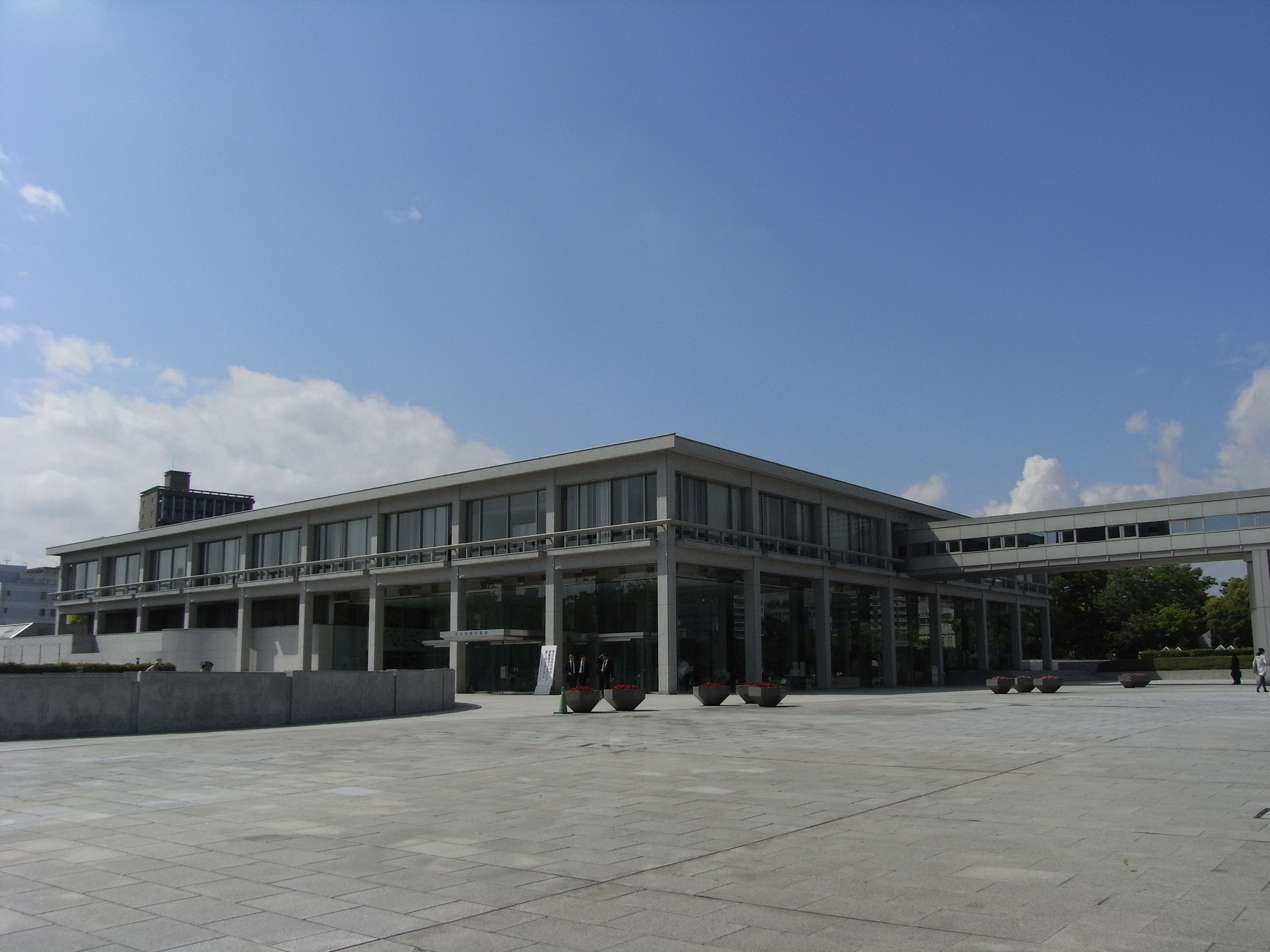
International Conference Center Hiroshima

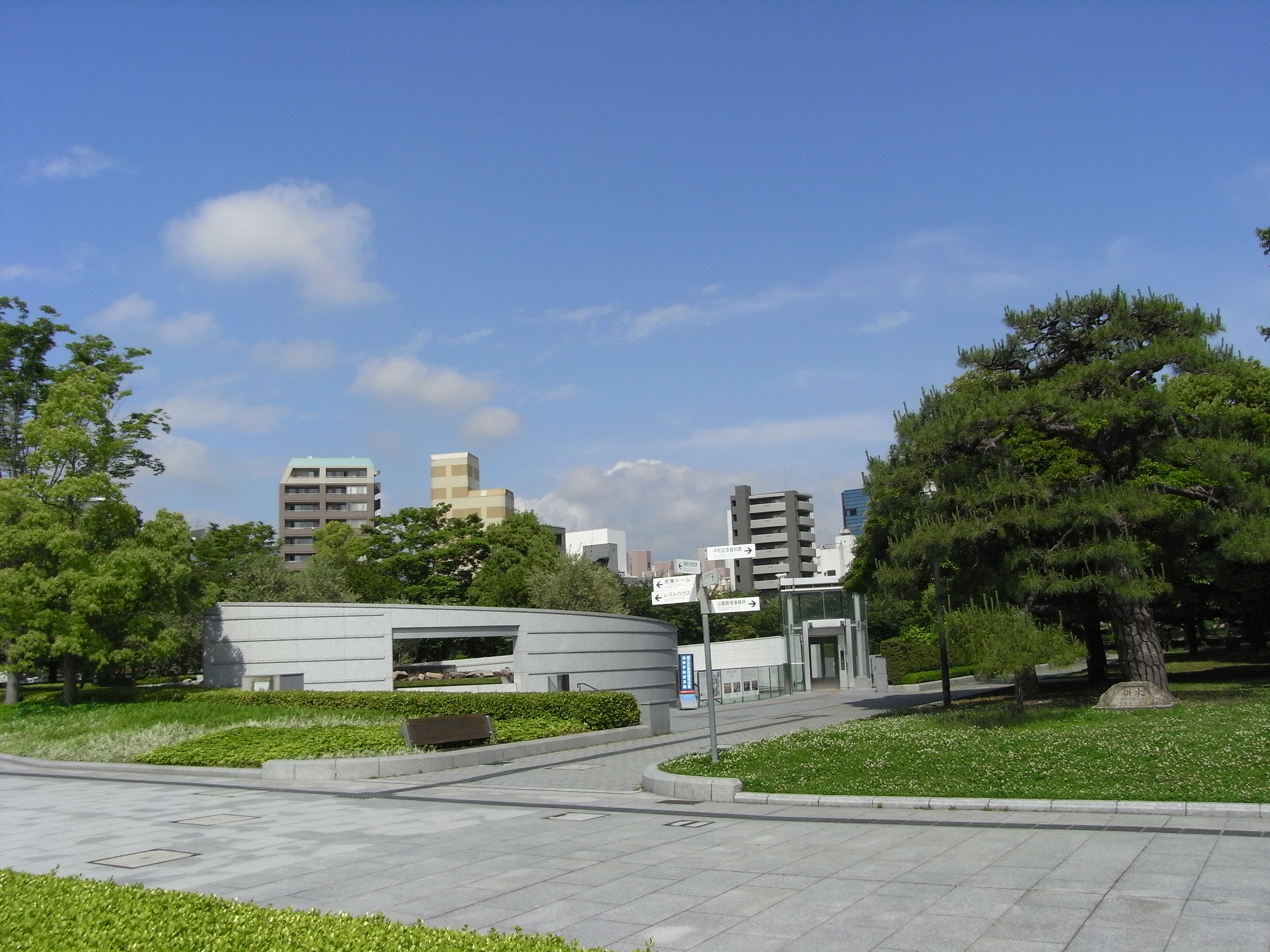
Hall of Remembrance

Hiroshima Peace Message Lantern Floating Ceremony, August 6, 2019

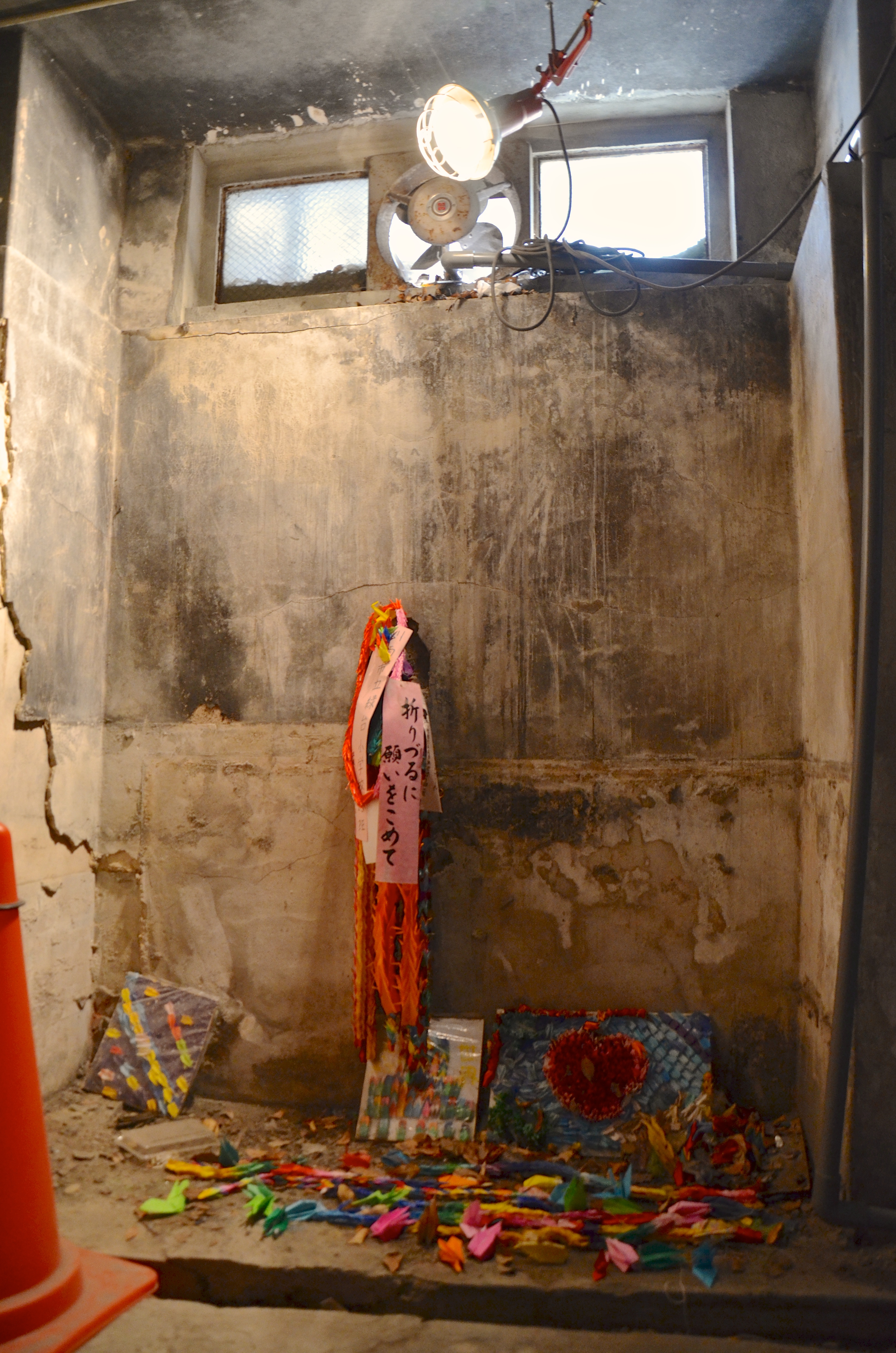
The Basement of the Rest House

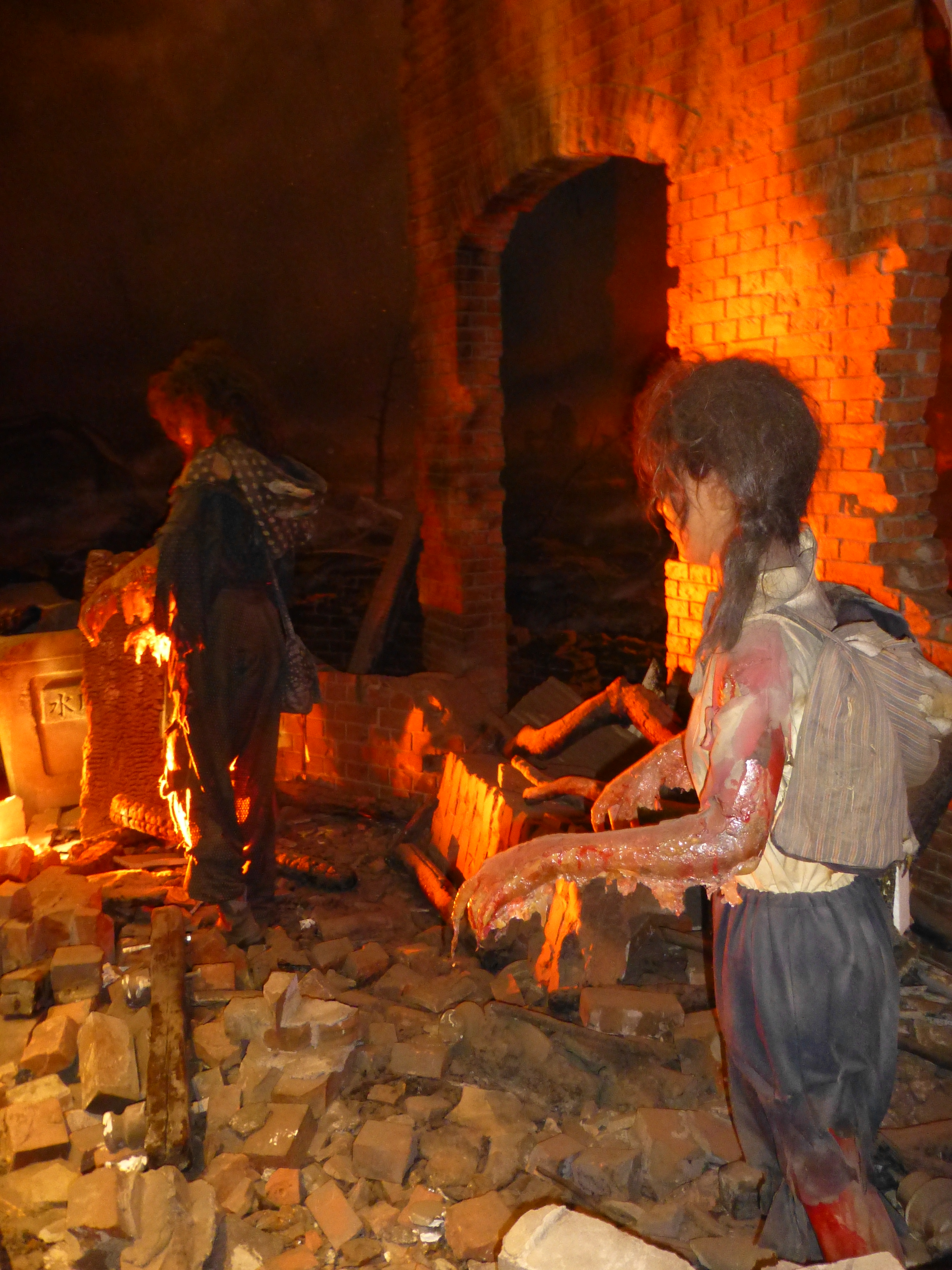
Reconstruction of physical damages on people and buildings after the explosion of the American atomic bomb in Hiroshima (August 6, 1945) formerly at the Hiroshima Peace Memorial Museum

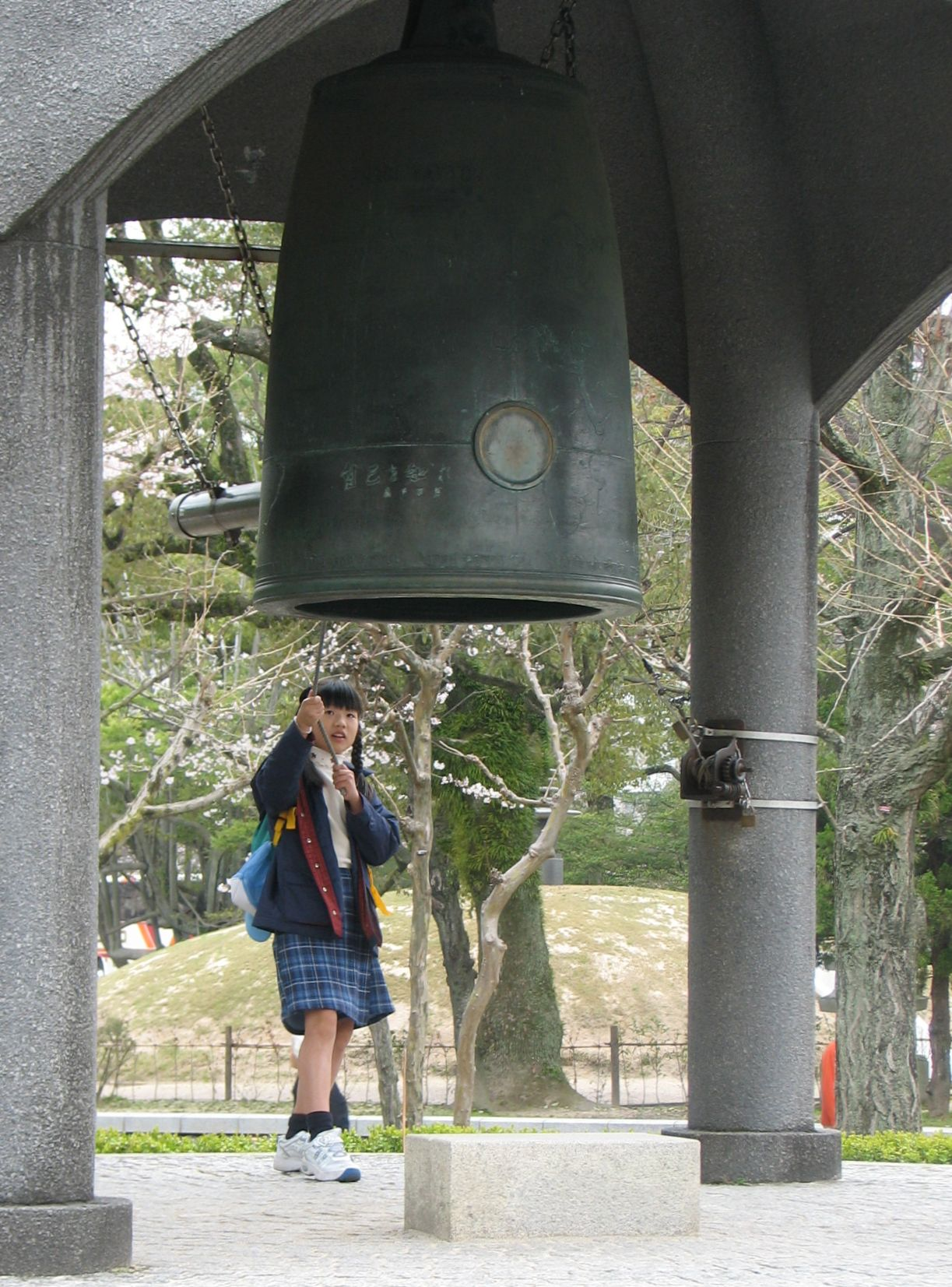
A schoolgirl rings the Peace Bell in the Hiroshima Peace Park.

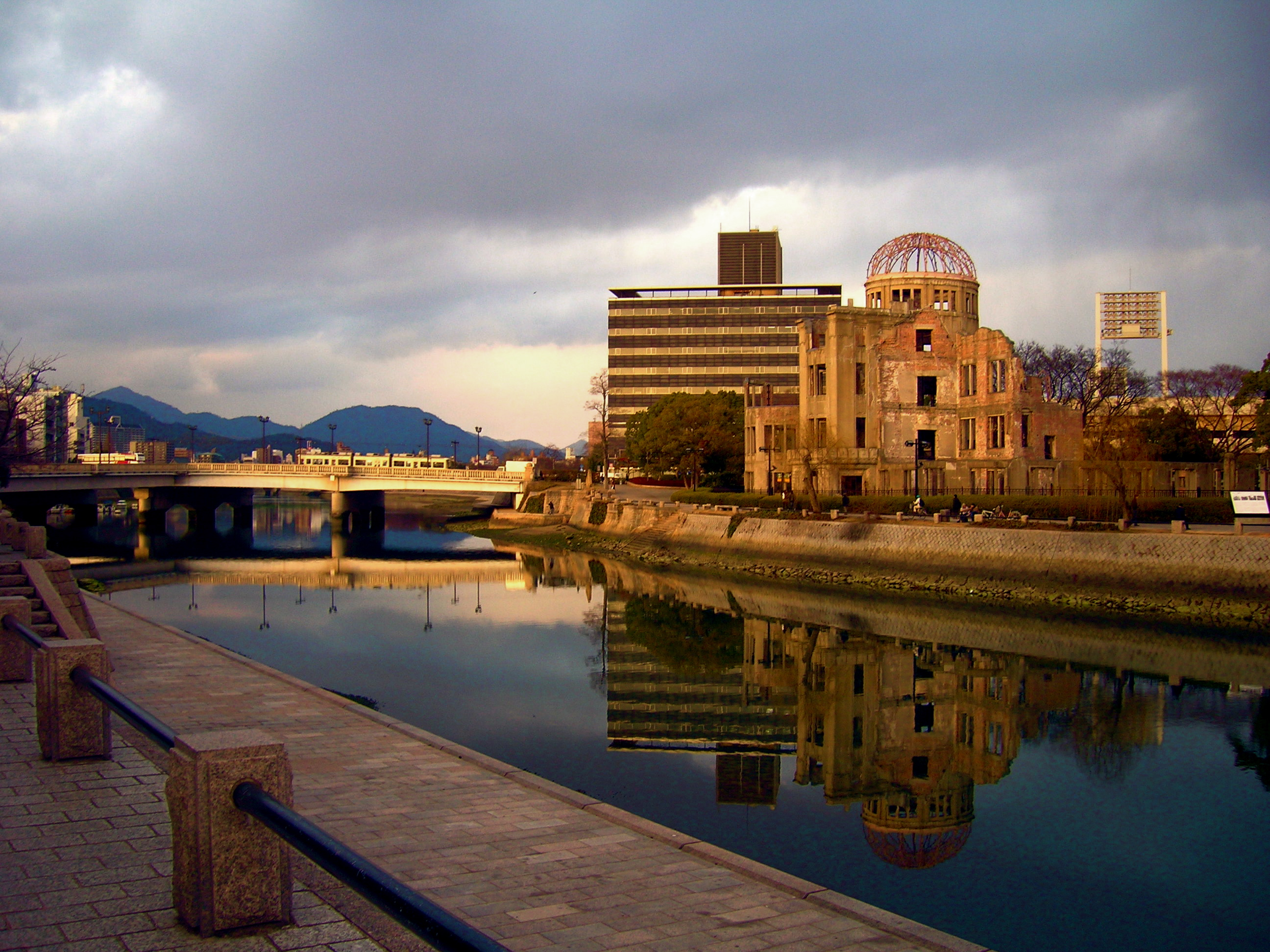
A-Bomb Dome at sunset

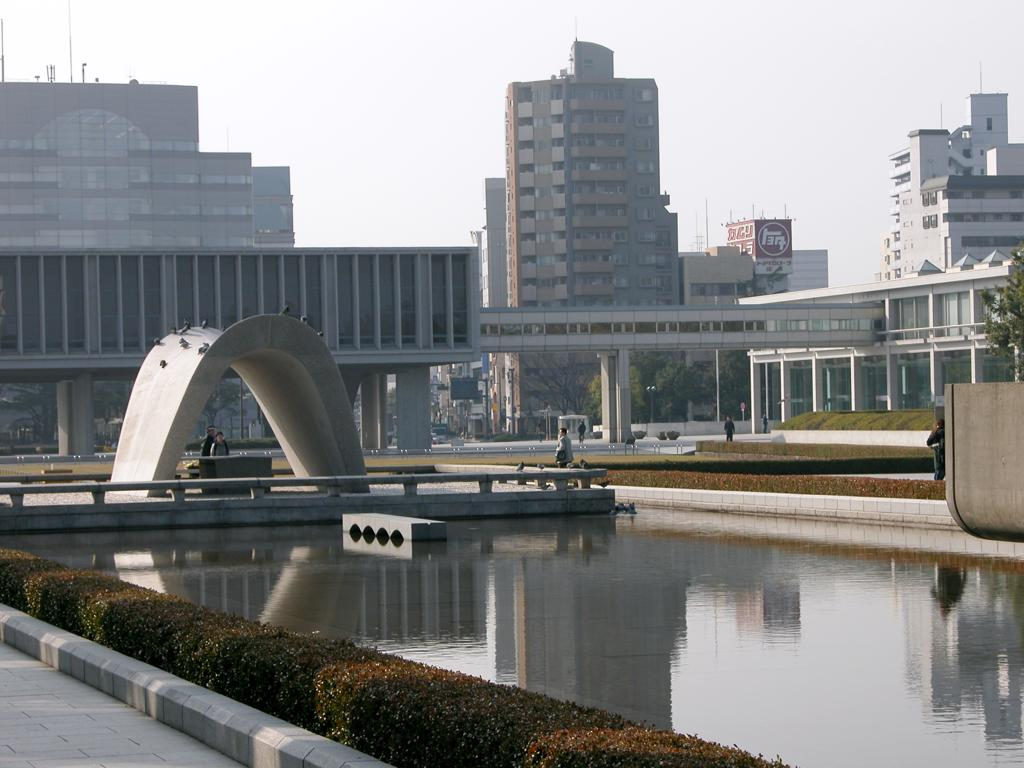
Hiroshima Pond of Peace

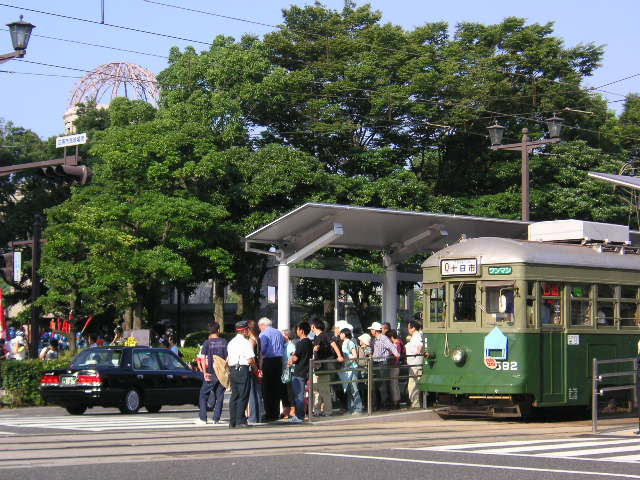
Hiroden Genbaku Dome-mae Station

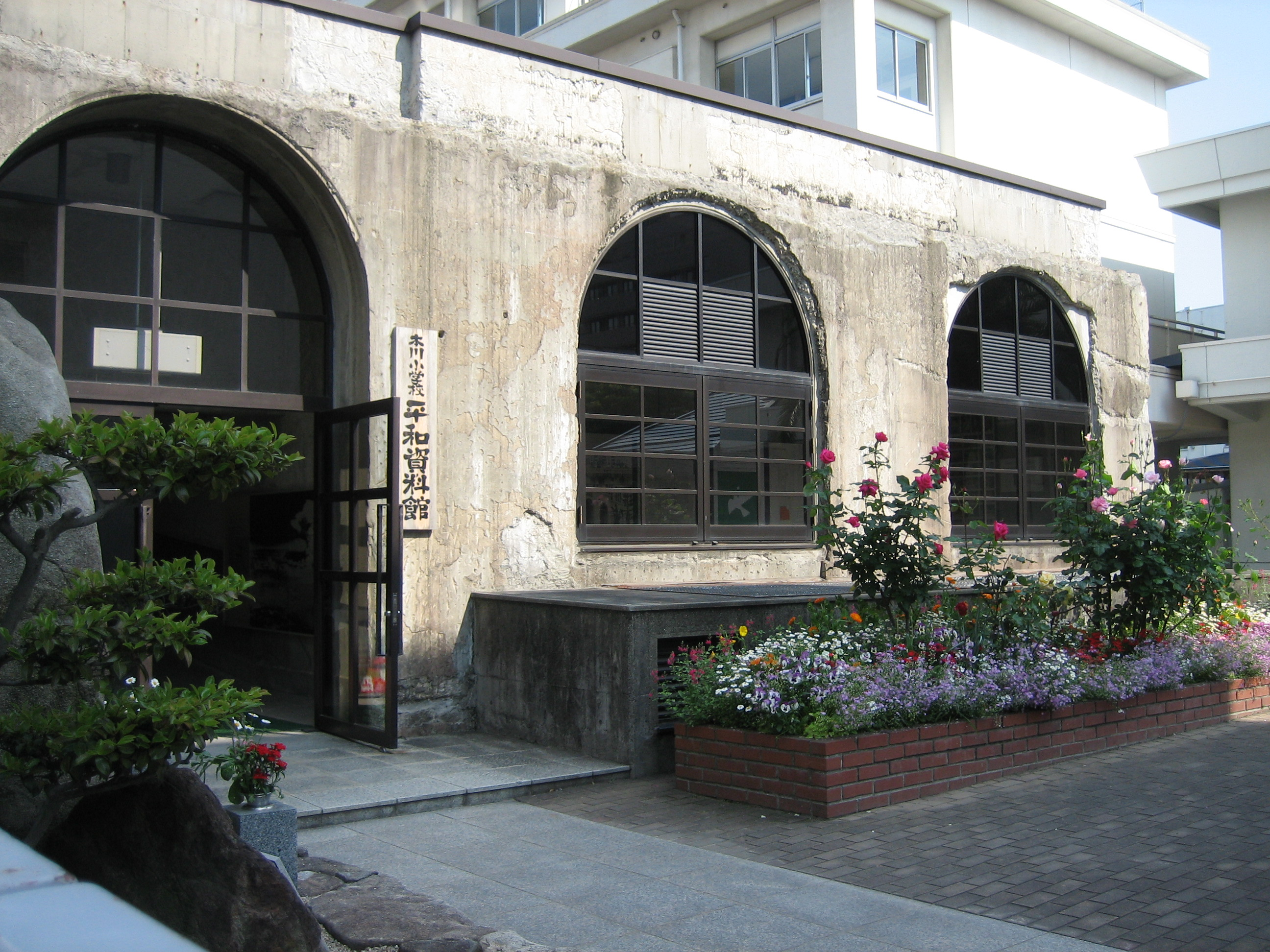
Honkawa Elementary School Peace Museum, atomic bombed former school building

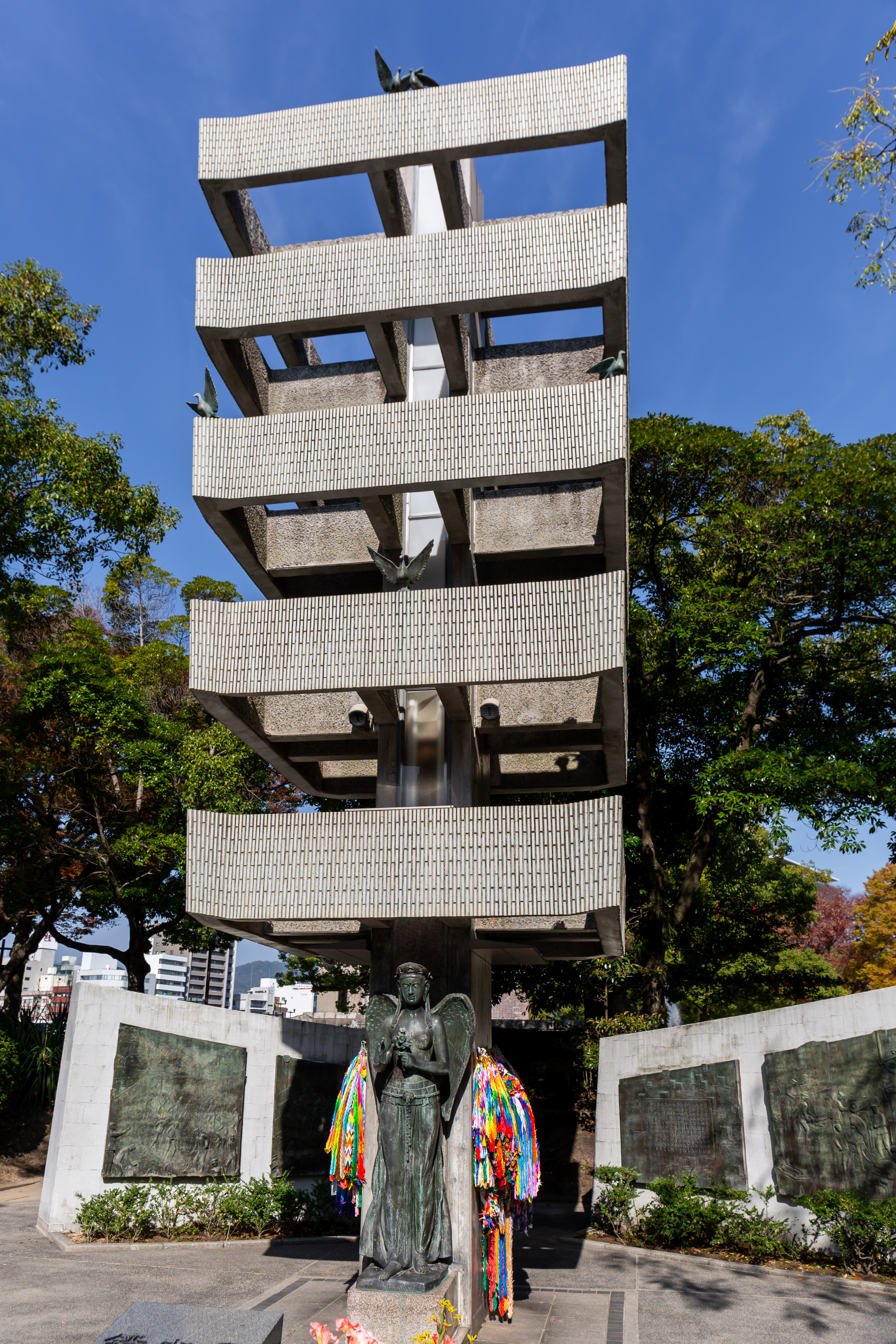
Memorial Tower to the Mobilized Students

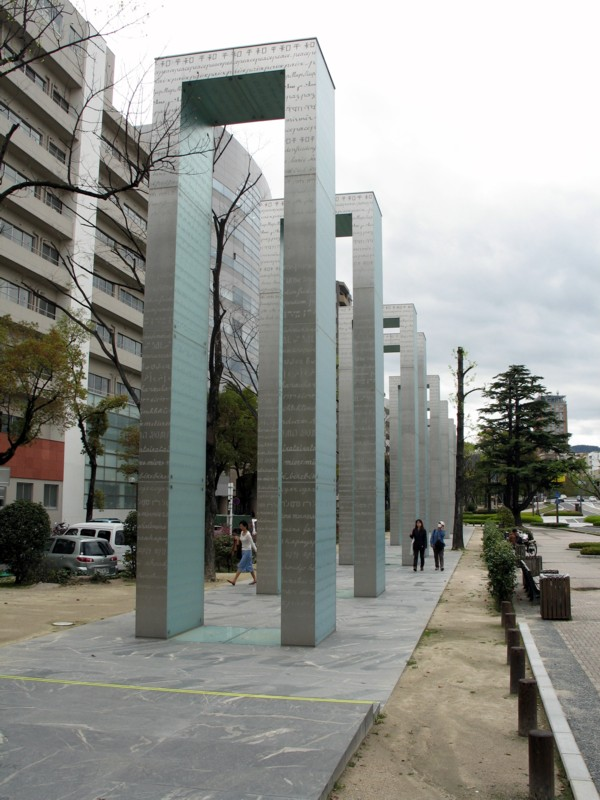
The Gates of Peace

== See also ==
- Atomic bombings of Hiroshima and Nagasaki
- Hiroshima Witness
- Nagasaki Peace Park
- Norman Cousins
- Marcel Junod
- Honkawa Elementary School Peace Museum
- Fukuromachi Elementary School Peace Museum
