= Hiroshima Dreamination =

Japanese winter festival

- Genre: Lighting
- Location: Hiroshima
- Founded: 2002
- Website: http://www.dreamination.com

Hiroshima Dreamination (ひろしまドリミネーション) is a winter festival of electric light held in Hiroshima, Japan since 2002. "Dreamination" is a composite word coined from "dream" and "illumination".

== Overview ==
The festival is hosted by the Light-up Hiroshima Project Executive Committee and supported by all public and private broadcasters in Hiroshima as a winter night attraction in for residents and visitors. Every street in downtown Hiroshima, together with the town squares are illuminated with a million and a half LED lights.

== Theme and staging dates ==
Year	Theme	Period
2002	Peaceful land and a witch – turn the town into the fairyland	November 6 – December 31, 2002; 18:00–23:00
2003	Fairyland – story of The Dragon and the George	November 15, 2003 – Jananuary 12, 2004; 17:00–23:00
2004	Fairyland – story of a winemaker and a Christmas tree on a starlit hill	November 17, 2004 – January 3, 2005; 17:00–23:00
2005	Fairyland – story of a prince in merry-go-land in Hartland	November 17, 2005 – January 3, 2006; 17:00–23:00
2006	Fairyland – story of Maeterlinck's Blue Bird	November 17, 2006 – January 3, 2007; 17:00–23:00
2007	Fairyland	November 17, 2007 – January 3, 2008; 17:00–23:00
2008	Fairyland	November 17, 2008 – January 3, 2009; 17:30–23:00
2009	Fairyland	November 6, 2009 – January 3, 2010; 17:30–23:00

== Sites ==
- Green belt of Peace Boulevard – main venue

Area	Location on Peace Boulevard	Area	Location on Peace Boulevard
Fruit grove	NHK Hiroshima	Guardian grove	Hotel Sunroute Hiroshima
Tower of the origami crane	ANA Crown Plaza Hiroshima	Dream tree	Hotel Dormy Inn Hiroshima
Peace Castle	Hiroshima Crystal Plaza	Holy place	Hiroshima Daini Yuraku Building
Hopes of the citizens	Mitsui Garden Hotel Hiroshima	Sailing ship of healing	Takeda Hiroshima Building
Happy land	Hiroshima Tokyu Inn	Phoenix hill	Chugoku Apollo
Snowfield of auroras	Kouwa building	Paradise of angels	Hiroshima Shinkin Bank
Wings	Oriental Hotel Hiroshima	Protective god Dragon	Hiroshima Kenshin

- Namiki-dori
- Kinzagai
- Chuo-dori
- Hondōri
- Nakanotana
- Hiroshima Alice Garden
- Higashi-Shinnten-chi public plaza
- Eastern riverside of Motoyasu River
- The former Hiroshima Branch of the Bank of Japan – one of the Hiroshima buildings hit by the 1945 atomic bomb.
- Kamiyachō Shareo
- NTT Motomachi Cred
- Hakushima Q-Garden
- Urban View Grand Tower

== Illuminated streetcars ==
- Illuminated streetcars are operated by Hiroshima Electric Railway

== Events ==
- Opening Event – parade, opening ceremony, lighting up ceremony, mini concerts on the first day
- Memorial Light up Ceremony and Mini Concert – every Saturday and on two national holidays in front of Hiroshima Crystal Plaza on Peace Boulevard
- Photo Contest
- Monument Design Contest
- Dreami coffee shop

== Sponsorships ==
=== Sponsor ===
- Hiroshima Light-up Project Executive Committee

=== Co-sponsors ===
- Chugoku Shimbun – Japanese daily newspaper for Chūgoku region, based in Hiroshima
- NHK Hiroshima – Japan Broadcasting Corporation, Hiroshima
- Hiroshima Telecasting
- Hiroshima Home Television
- Shinhiroshima Telecasting
- Hiroshima FM
- Hiroshima P-station
- Fureai Channel
