= Namiki-dōri (Hiroshima) =

Shopping street in Hiroshima, Japan

Namiki-dōri (並木通り) is one of the fashionable shopping streets in Hiroshima, Japan.

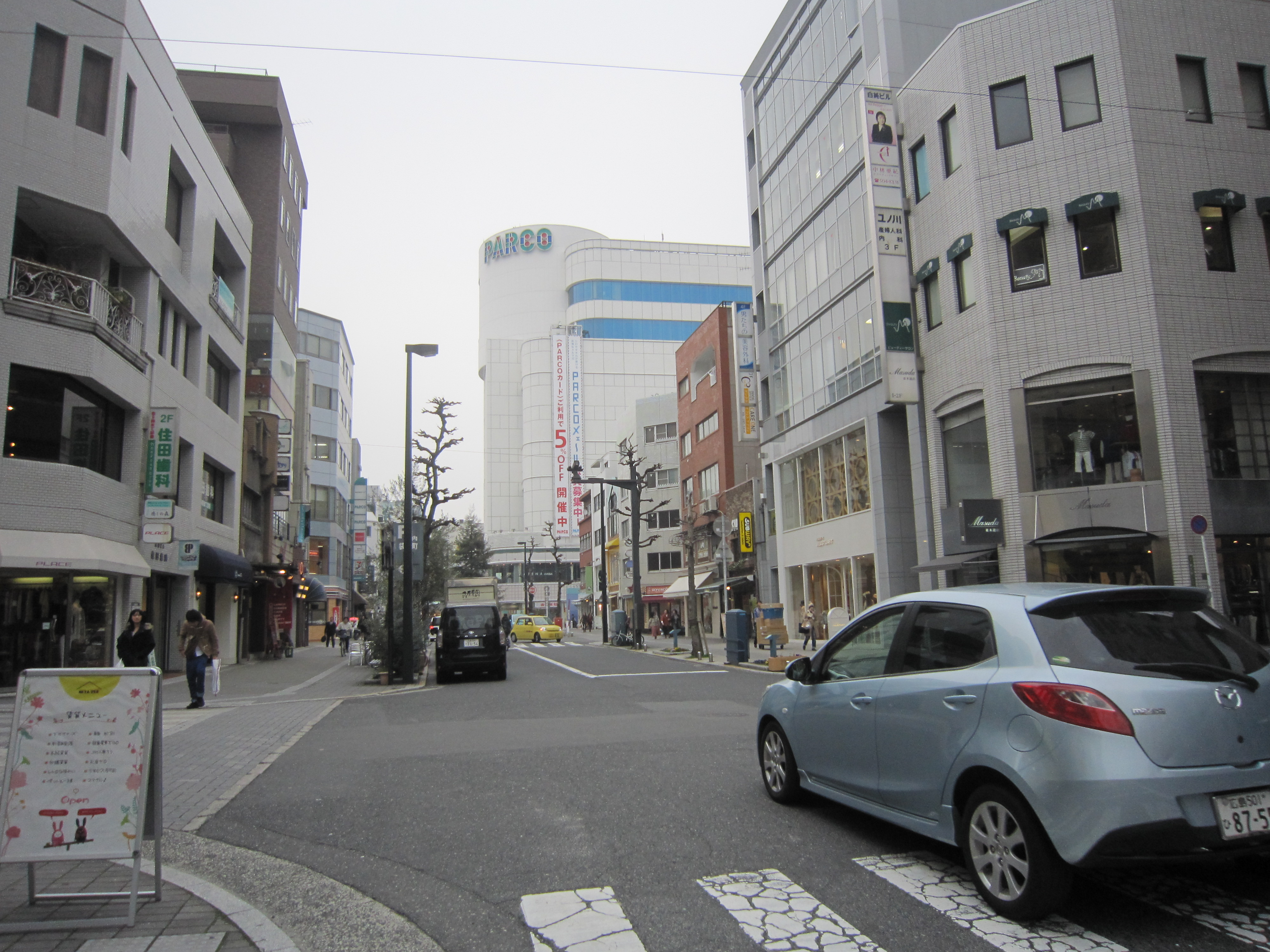

The street runs about 400 meters from north to south and connected to Hondori at the north end and Peace Boulevard at the south end.

== History ==
- The street used to be a part of a canal for the castle town, and the canal was called "Hirataya-gawa (Hirataya River)".
- In 1915 and 1955, the river (canal) was reclaimed.
