= Hiroshima Flower Festival =

Annual flower festival in Japan

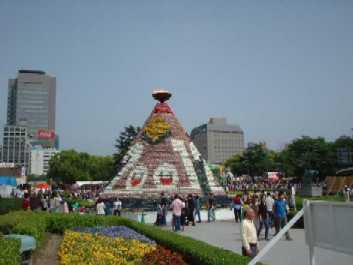
- Symbol Flower Tower with Flame
- Location: Hiroshima
- Founded: 1977
- Website: http://www.hiroshima-ff.com

The Hiroshima Flower Festival (ひろしまフラワーフェスティバル) is a flower festival held annually in Hiroshima, Japan.

== Overview ==
The Hiroshima Flower Festival has been held every year since 1977 during Golden Week, from 3 May to 5 May. More than one million people take part in the festival each year.

The festival includes multiple stages for entertainment, shops, a small zoo, and other amusement attractions along Peace Boulevard and in Hiroshima Peace Memorial Park. Many concerts, dancing shows, fashion shows, talk shows, and traditional and contemporary performances featuring local citizens and other events are held throughout the area. Locals also participate in a parade, and Yosakoi dance on Peace Boulevard.

== History ==
The origin of the festival is the Japanese professional baseball Central League Champion parade for the Hiroshima Toyo Carp team in 1975. At the inaugural festival in 1977, Agnes Lum had to be escorted from the festival on a fire truck due to the number of fans overwhelming the event.

== Themes ==
The underlying themes of the festival are to:

1. Make Hiroshima full of flowers, greens, and music.
2. Share the brightness and dignity of life with all people.
3. Appeal for a warm-hearted cultural and personnel interchange from Hiroshima to the world.

== Events ==
The key events of the festival are:

=== Parades ===
- Flower parade on May 3.
- Kinsai (visit us) Yosakoi parade on May 5.

=== Concerts and performances ===
- Multiple concerts and performances on twenty stages, and in seventy squares every day.
- Candlelight services with peace messages and origami cranes
- Mikoshi, Kagura and peace concerts are held at night.

=== Flower singer ===
- A featured performer termed the Flower singer was arranged to sing the theme song each year up to 2005. From 2006 the Flower singer was replaced with Flower Festival special guests, and other guests were also noted. These performers have been:

Year	Flower singer	Other artists
1977, 1978	Naomi Sagara	
1979, 1980, 1985	Yoko Seri	
1981	Junko Sakurada	
1982	Hitomi Ishikawa	
1983	Ikue Sakakibara	
1984	Hidemi Ishikawa	
1986	Judy Ongg	
1987	Miho Nakayama	
1988	Yū Hayami	
1989	Noriko Sakai	
1990	Tomomi Nishimura	
1991	Fuyumi Sakamoto	
1992	Eriko Tamura	
1993	Reiko Kato	
1994	Oyunaa	
1995	Marcia	
1996	Ranran Suzuki	
1997	Yoshie Hayasaka	
1998	Kim Yeon-ja	
1999	Hikaru Nishida	
2000	Kumiko Endo	
2001	Miki Sakai	
2002	Wakako Shimazaki	
2003	Hitomi Shimatani	
2004	Sonim	
2005	Sayaka Kamizono	
Year	FF special guests	Other guests
2006	MAX, Koriki Choshu, Hinoi Team	
2007	Masashi Akiyama, Takako Uehara, Younha	
2008	Ai Kawashima, Kousuke Atari, TDR characters	
2009	Jero, Kaori Mizumori, Yokota-Kaguradan	Aki-Gakudan, Osedo Chishima, Takashi & Chiharu, Sayaka Kamizono, Katsuhiko & Maco, Kentaro Kihara, Takahiro Miyazaki, CNA, DSC, Tomonari Takano, Takarabune, Chiharu Tamaki, trunk, Shoji Narita, Mebius, Kenta Morimoto, Anri Kumaki, The generous, Scandal, Miho Fukuhara, Lil'B
