= Urban View Grand Tower =

Coordinates: 34°23′58.04″N 132°27′52.77″E

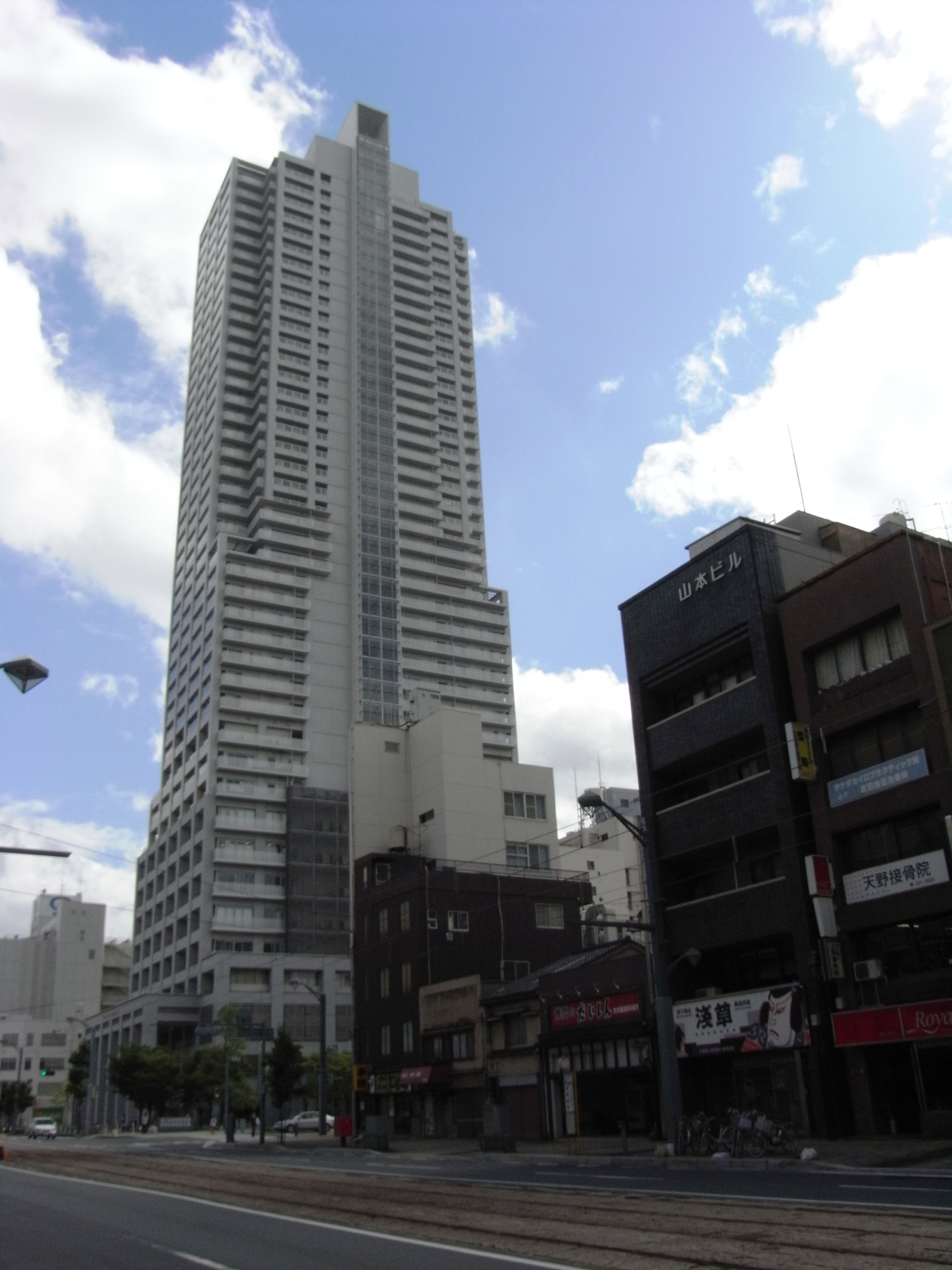
Urban View Grand Tower

The Urban View Grand Tower (アーバンビューグランドタワー) is a skyscraper located in Hiroshima, Hiroshima Prefecture, Japan. Construction of the 166-metre, 43-storey skyscraper was finished in 2004.
