= Peace Boulevard (Hiroshima) =

Street in Hiroshima, Japan

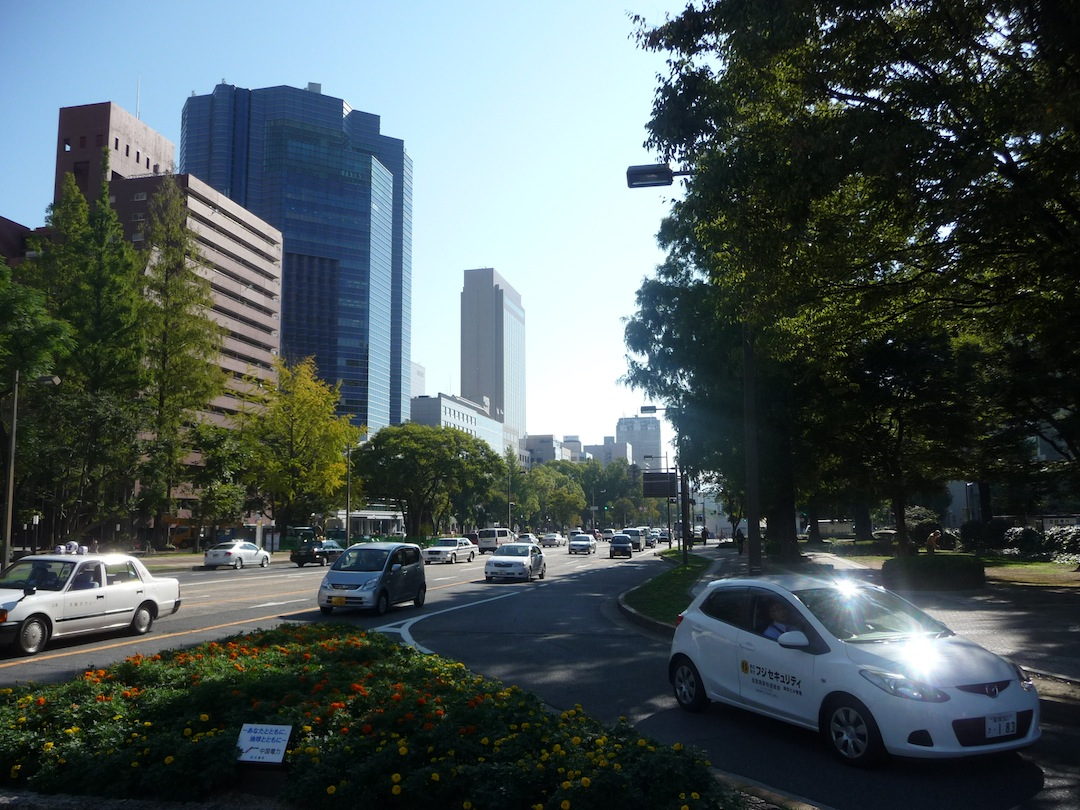
Hiroshima Peace Blvd view towards east

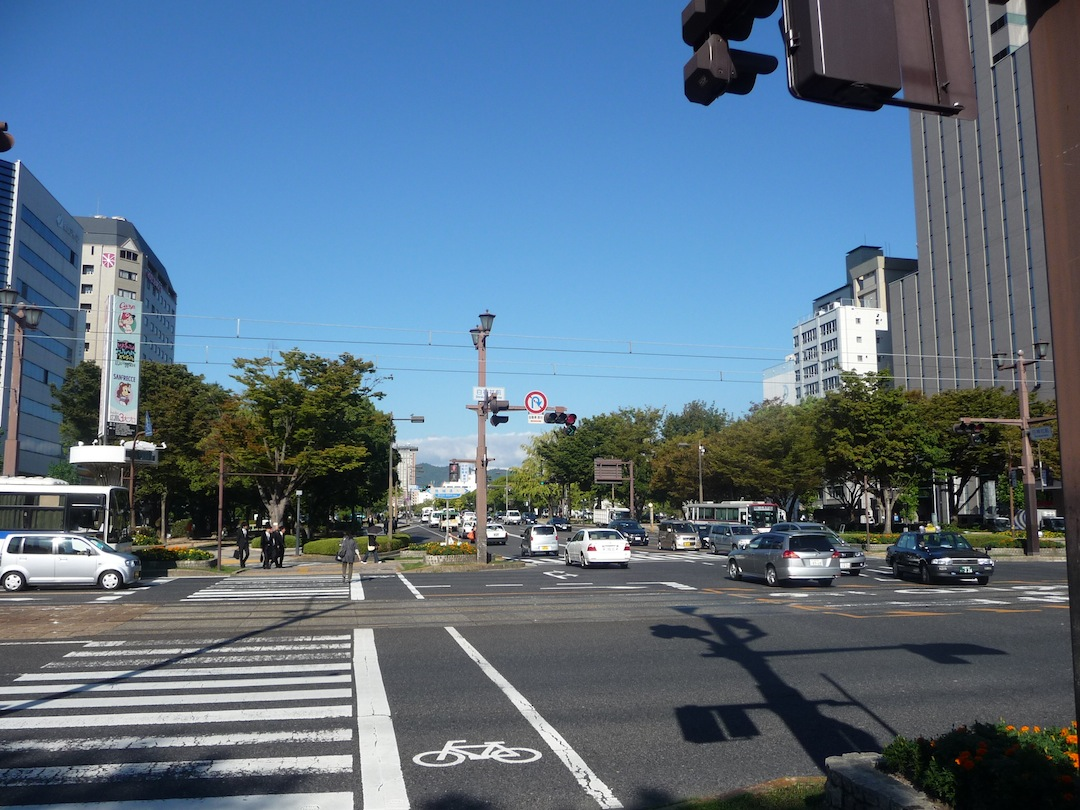
Hiroshima Peace Blvd view towards west, to the south of Memorial Park

Peace Boulevard (平和大通り, Heiwa Ōdōri) is one of the main streets in Hiroshima, Japan, which faces the south side of Hiroshima Peace Memorial Park.

The street is 100 metres (330 ft) wide and runs 3.6 kilometres (2.2 miles) from east to west, between Tsurumi-cho and Fukushima-cho within the green belt.

There are 5 bridges connecting to the street including the west and east Peace Bridges by Isamu Noguchi.

The west-end bridge connects to "Nishi Hiroshima Station" and the east-end bridge connects to "Hijiyama Park"

== History ==
- The construction was started by citizens and students in 1945, the year World War II ended, as a firebreak.
- On 6 August 1945, tens of thousands of citizens and students were killed by the a-bomb. The exact number of victims is still unknown.
- The plan to build the Peace Boulevard, the Hiroshima Castle, the Hiroshima Peace Memorial Park and the Hiroshima Chūō Park were formalized in the Hiroshima Peace Memorial City Construction Law of 1948.
- In the mid-1950s, there was a tree-planting campaign. Around 120,000 trees were donated from Hiroshima Prefecture alone, and many more trees and plants were presented from all over Japan and the rest of the world in the name of peace.
- Now, the Peace Boulevard and the Hiroshima Peace Memorial Park are places of recreation and relaxation for citizens.
- The Peace Boulevard is the site of many events, such as Hiroshima Dreamination, concerts, ekiden races (including the Inter-prefectural Men's Ekiden of Hiroshima) and the Hiroshima Flower Festival.

== See also ==
- Atomic bombings of Hiroshima and Nagasaki
