= Eizo Nomura (Hiroshima survivor) =

Japanese survivor of Hiroshima

- 野村 栄三
- Born: 1898; Japan
- Died: 1982 (aged 83–84)
- Children: Four

Eizo Nomura (野村 栄三, Nomura Eizo; 1898 – 1982), also written as Eiso or Eizō, was a Japanese civilian working in Hiroshima, Japan, at the time of the atomic bombing of the city on August 6, 1945. Nomura survived the blast and aftermath, despite being only 170 m (560 ft) from the hypocenter. He was the closest known survivor of an atomic bomb explosion.

== Background ==
The United States had been bombing Japanese cities with conventional explosives and incendiary bombs for months prior to August 1945, often with terrible effect. On the night of March 9-10 Tokyo had been bombed in what was considered the single most destructive aerial bombing raid in human history, leaving an estimated 100,000 dead and 1 million homeless.

Hiroshima had been relatively unscathed prior to August. It was selected as the primary target for the first atomic bomb because of its military and industrial installations. For months prior to August the United States dropped leaflets in Japanese, some 63 million leaflets in all, over several dozen Japanese cities, warning civilians to evacuate urban areas. On August 1, there was a leaflet drop over 35 Japanese cities, including Hiroshima. A decision was made to not have a special leaflet drop to warn specifically of the atomic bomb on August 6 because of the uncertainty of actual detonation and to maximize the shock effect on Japanese leadership.

At the time of the attack, the population of Hiroshima was approximately 340,000 – 350,000. An estimated 21,000 people were within 500 meters of the hypocenter on the day of the bombing. The bombing occurred on a Monday morning during rush hour.

Because of the absence of warning and the population's lack of concern about individual planes, the explosion came as an almost complete surprise, and the people had not taken shelter. The bomb released an energy equivalent to four times the tonnage of conventional bombs that had destroyed the city of Dresden, Germany in February, 1945.

== Day of the bombing ==
On August 6, 1945 the 47-year old Eizo Nomura, a father of four, was working for the prefecture’s Fuel Rationing Control Union, in what was called the Fuel Hall (today the Rest House in Hiroshima's Peace Memorial Park). Nomura was one of 37 employees working there. The building was a steel-frame reinforced concrete structure, with three stories above the ground and one below, located near the Motoyasu River. Nomura said later that ordinarily his section manager would have provided documents for him to work on already on his desk, but that day seemed to have forgotten. So Nomura went to the basement to fetch the documents himself. He described the basement room as small, about 10 tsubo, or 33 m^{2} (360 sq ft).

The bomb detonated at 8:15 AM, while Nomura was in the basement. The explosion occurred at a height of about 580 m (1,900 ft), with the hypocenter (point on the surface directly below the explosion) about 170 m (560 ft) northeast of the building.

In an account given five years after the event, Nomura said that he heard a huge boom and the lights went out, leaving him in complete darkness. He felt a sharp pain, was struck by debris, and felt himself bleeding from the head. Disoriented, he attempted to climb the stairs, but most of the staircase had been destroyed and replaced with boards, tile, sand, and at least one dead body. He realized the building must have been hit by a bomb but had no sense of the scale of it. There were cries and shouts for help, "terrible wailing sobs". He eventually made it to the first floor, then jumped out of a window to get to the street. Of the 37 workers, eight managed to escape the building, four men and four women, although Nomura eventually became the only survivor.

Outside, the area was covered in deep black smoke making it "as black as it is on a half-moon night." Along with an injured coworker he went toward the Motoyasu Bridge, encountering a man lying naked and shaking, his arms and legs stretched into the air, with something burning underneath him. In a memoir written 25 years later Nomura drew several pictures of the things he experienced, including an image of the dying man.

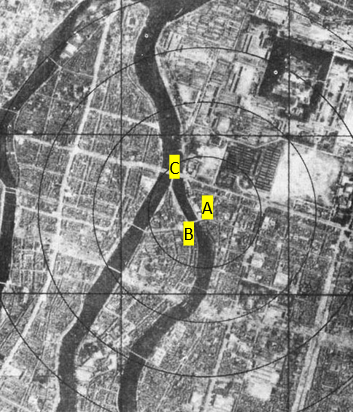
Hiroshima before bombing with hypocenter (A), the Fuel Hall building (B), and the Aioi Bridge (C) marked, along with 1000 ft (305 m) circles from hypocenter. The Aioi Bridge, with its distinctive T-shape, was the intended target of the bomb, but the bomb drifted to the SE by 240 m.

Nomura and his colleague were joined by a small number of other survivors, virtually all of whom were injured. One woman said she was going blind and others had apparent internal injuries. They huddled on some stone steps that led down to the Motoyasu River. The buildings on the other side of the river were already on fire, and the buildings on their side soon followed, including the Fuel Hall. Burning wooden boards and other debris fell on them from the intense smoke clouds. An enormous water spout sprang out of the river, one of many tornados and fire whirls which sprang up from the extreme conditions, and filled the air with more debris. They used water from the river to wet their clothes to try to get relief from the smoke and heat, eventually climbing the stairs to huddle near a stone wall above them, surrounded by fire, flaming debris, and explosions, perhaps from oil or gas tanks igniting.

After a time it began to rain, eventually coming down in torrents, a manifestation of black rain, a toxic precipitation formed from irradiated materials that fell as a black, sticky radioactive substance. Some of the survivors, desperately thirsty, drank the rain, unwittingly making their odds of future survival even worse.

One of his surviving coworkers asked Nomura if he could go try to get help. Although he felt it was certain death to try to navigate the fires, Nomura set off across the Aioi Bridge and headed west. After picking his way through scattered fires and encountering numerous injured people he eventually came upon five or six soldiers trying to help wounded people at Kusatsu. He begged them to help his coworkers but at the same time realized it was pointless, since there were thousands of badly injured people everywhere. He said that he eventually headed southwest towards Hatsukaichi, [his home], and arrived there at around 2:30 PM.

== Aftermath ==
About 3 1/2 weeks after the bombing, Nomura fell badly ill. His description, written in 1950:

On the night of September 1, I suddenly had shivering fits. I had a fever of around 40 degrees [104°F], and it lasted for seven or eight days. During this period, in Hatsukaichi-machi, many people died every day, displaying symptoms similar to mine. I had a sore throat and five or six bleeding spots. My gums began to rot, and I continued to suffer serious diarrhea for more than 10 days. I was growing completely weak. There was no medicine available, and doctors were at a loss how to take care of me. I hear that all my relatives gave up on me.
As time went on, however, I gradually recovered, and today I am healthy enough.

The symptoms he described were characteristic of exposure to excessive radiation.

In the late 1960s, the Hiroshima University Research Institute for Radiation Biology and Medicine and the city of Hiroshima, along with other institutions, conducted door-to-door interviews to identify 78 people, Nomura among them, who had been within 500 m (1,600 ft) of the hypocenter and survived. Those survivors were from an estimated 21,000 people who had been within that radius at the time of the blast, representing 99.6% mortality. Since 1972 that group of 78 people had been studied extensively. The radiation exposure of the group ranged from 1 to 6 Sieverts, with an average of about 3. As comparison, an instantaneous exposure of 2.0 Sieverts is considered by NASA to be "severe radiation poisoning."

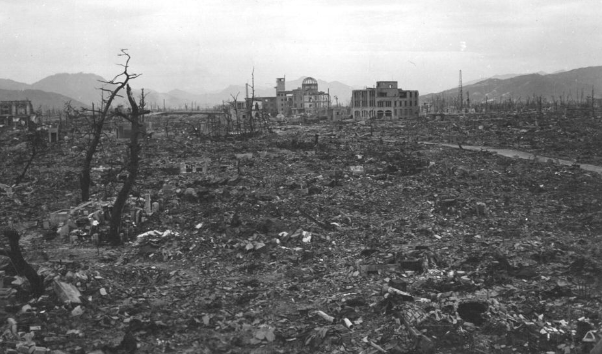
Downtown Hiroshima shortly after the bombing in August 1945, taken from about 500 m SW of the hypocenter. The only two buildings standing in the scene are the "A-Bomb Dome" (as it is known today) in the center rear, and the Fuel Hall where Eizo Nomura was working, to the right of that.

The bombing at Hiroshima was the first and the most destructive of the two atomic bombs dropped by the United States, the second being at Nagasaki on August 9. At Hiroshima between 60,000 and 80,000 people were killed instantly by the initial blast of 3,000 - 4,000 degree C heat, the shock wave which followed, and the ensuing fires. Within a radius of 1.3 km almost every structure was destroyed and almost every person killed. Thousands of people burned to death while trapped under collapsed buildings. Many of those that survived were badly injured or burned and succumbed to their wounds over the next days and weeks. Thousands more died from radiation poisoning. In all it is estimated that 140,000 people died at Hiroshima by the end of 1945. Even of those who survived, many suffered from persistent health problems over their lives, increased incidence of cancer and other diseases, as well as psychological problems. For example, 79% of the 78 survivors who were under the age of 20 eventually got cancer.

Nomura is the only person known to have been within 200 m (660 ft) of an atomic bomb blast and have lived.

== Later life and legacy ==
Several years after the war, the city of Hiroshima solicited A-bomb experiences. Of the 164 stories received, 18 were published in a booklet entitled "Record of A-bomb Experience" in 1950. Eizo Nomura's account, called "Exposed at the Hypocenter", was the lead story of the booklet.

In 1970, at the age of 72, Nomura started writing a memoir of his life, called Waga Omoide no Ki (My Memories). One of the chapters was entitled simply "Atomic Bombing". He wrote for several years, completing 800 pages of handwritten manuscript. In 2015, the manuscript was in the possession of Nomura’s third son Hideo, who was age 80 at that time, but its current status is uncertain.

Eizo Nomura was concerned about nuclear arms and the future. He stated, “In a future world war, it will be difficult for one in 37 people to survive. The entire earth will be covered in radiation, and even strong and healthy people will eventually die of illness.” He continued to share his experience throughout his life. He died in 1982 at the age of 83-84.

Mr. Nomura is honored in several museums and memorials, such as the Hiroshima National Peace Memorial Hall, for his story and survival.

In Japan, Nomura and other atomic bomb survivors have the designation of hibakusha (Japanese: 被爆者 or 被曝者). As of March, 2026 there were approximately 91,000 hibakusha still alive from both Hiroshima and Nagasaki, out of an original 650,000.

== See also ==
- Atomic bombings of Hiroshima and Nagasaki
- Hibakujumoku (survivor trees)
- Eizo Nomura's drawings: https://hpmm-db.jp/list/?cate=picture_en&search_type=list&keyword=Eizo+Nomura
