= Atom-bombed Mary =

Marian icon in Japan

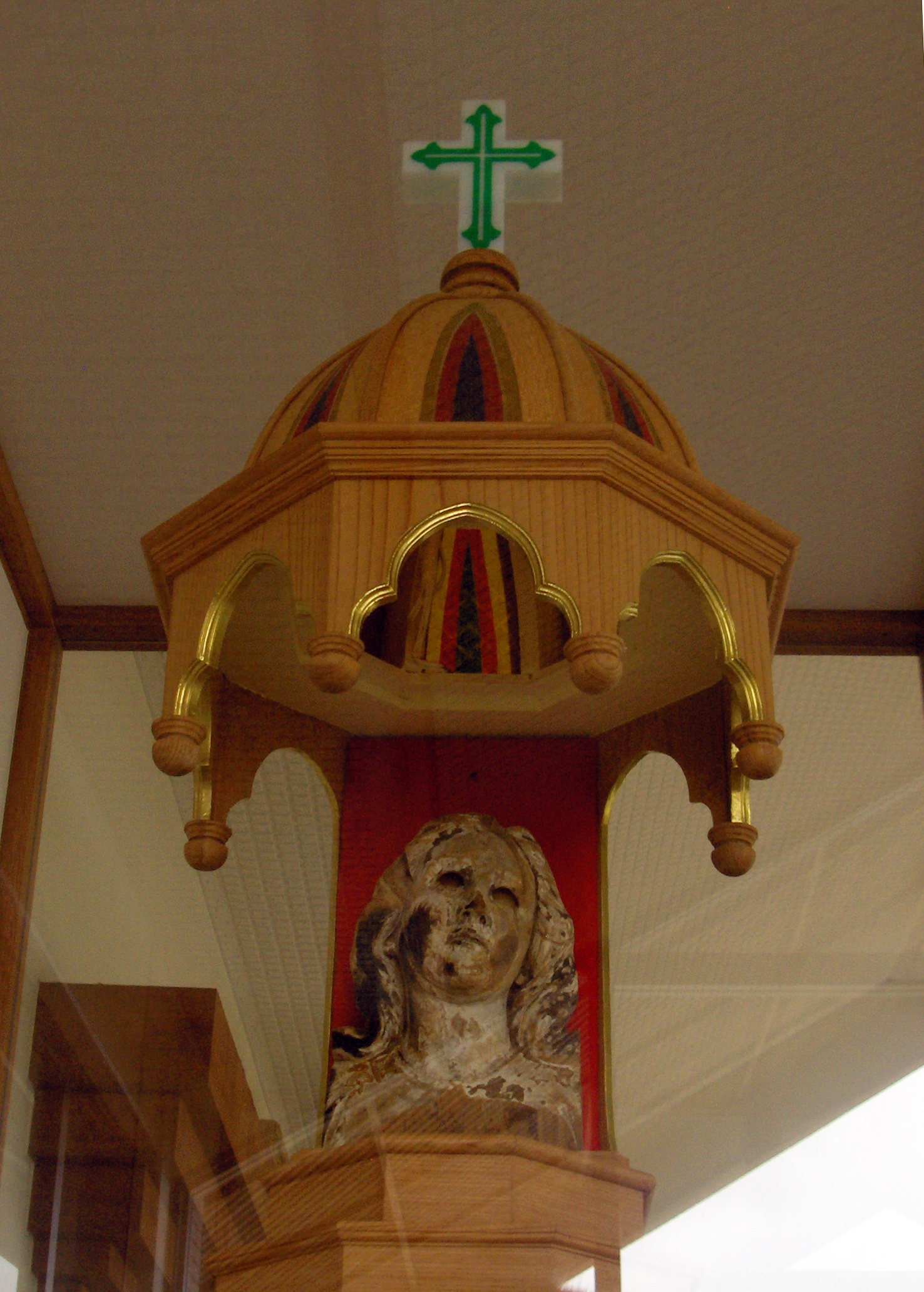
Atom-bombed Mary in the Urakami Cathedral

Atom-bombed Mary (Japanese: 被爆のマリア, Hepburn: Hibaku no Maria), also known as Our Lady of Nagasaki or the Virgin of Nagasaki, is the head from a wooden statue of Mary, mother of Jesus from a cathedral in Nagasaki, Japan. The statue survived the atomic bombing of Nagasaki in August 1945, but was severely damaged as a result of the explosion.

== History ==
After the persecution of Christians in Japan ended in 1873, Japanese Catholics purchased land in the Urakami Valley district of Nagasaki, where fumi-e interrogations had taken place. On that land, the Urakami Cathedral was built; construction was completed in 1895, and it was consecrated in 1925. Three years later, a wooden altarpiece depicting Mary was constructed, inspired by a painting by the Spanish artist Bartolomé Murillo. The statue was constructed in Italy.

On August 9, 1945, three days after the city of Hiroshima had been obliterated by an atomic bomb, an American B-29 bomber dropped the plutonium-powered "Fat Man" bomb on Nagasaki, destroying the Urakami cathedral. Later, the Trappist monk Kaemon Noguchi entered the ruins of the chapel to pray, and found the remains of the statue of Mary, burned and damaged. It had missing eyes and a crack across its face. Noguchi took the statue with him to his monastery in Hokkaido. In 1975, he returned it when he learned that the church was looking for relics that survived the bombing. The statue was held in the Nagasaki Atomic Bomb Museum until 2005, when it was moved back to the Urakami Cathedral, which had been rebuilt.

In 2005, Kofi Annan, Secretary-General of the United Nations, visited the statue in Japan, and said that seeing it "strengthened [his] determination to see the end of all nuclear weapons". In 2010, Archbishop Joseph Mitsuaki Takami brought the statue with him to the United Nations headquarters in New York City, where he pleaded for the global elimination of nuclear weapons. In 2019, Pope Francis held Papal Mass in a trip to Nagasaki with the statue near the altar.

== See also ==
- Our Lady of Akita
- Hibakusha
