= Kuryu =

Kuryu is a Japanese surname. Notable people with the surname include:

- Akira Kuryu (born 1947), Japanese architect
- Shun'ichi Kuryu (born 1958), Japanese bureaucrat

== See also ==
- Kuryu Rakusen-en Sanatorium
