= Urakami Yoban Kuzure =

19th-century crackdown on Christians in Nagasaki, Japan

Urakami Yoban Kuzure (浦上四番崩れ) was the last and biggest of four crackdowns on Christians in Urakami Village, Nagasaki, Japan in the 19th century.

== Overview ==
The introduction of Christianity to Japan occurred in 1549 with the arrival of the Navarrese missionary Francis Xavier, who arrived by Portuguese ship. Christianity was initially welcomed, but following concerns that it posed a threat to Japanese political and social order, the religion was officially banned in 1614. This led to a period of severe persecution and isolation of Christians, which lasted for 259 years until the ban was lifted in the 19th century. In 1867, at the end of the Tokugawa Shogunate, villagers of Urakami who had maintained their faith as Hidden Christians (Kakure Kirisitan) and declared their Christian faith were captured and tortured in large numbers by order of the Shogunate. The Edo Shogunate was soon dissolved, but the villagers were exiled by the new Meiji government, which had taken over the Shogunate's policy of banning Christianity.

This incident was sharply criticized by Western countries where the Christian faith flourished. This led to the abolition of the Christian ban in 1873, and the lifting of the ban on the Christian faith in Japan for the first time in 259 years since the total ban in 1614.

== Background ==
From 1639 the Tokugawa Shogunate closed the country to the rest of the world and only in Nagasaki was trade with Portugal allowed(Sakoku-isolationist foreign policy).

Under the Tokugawa Shogunate everyone had to belong to a Buddhist temple to prove they were not Christian. Those who were found to be Christian were tortured to obtain information on other Christians and then subsequently executed. So, the discovery of one Secret Christian usually led to a number of them being executed. After the Shogunate issued a ban on the practice of Christianity, the believers became Hidden Christians, secretly defending their faith and passing it on to the next generation.

Spread across the country, several Christian communities existed, but after the ban, they disappeared over the years and remained clandestinely only in the vicinity of Nagasaki.

Among these hidden Christians in Nagasaki, there was a prophecy of a preacher named Bastian, who was captured and martyred by the shogunate in the early Edo period (1603–1867). It was said, "If you endure for seven generations, a padre (priest) will come again from Rome." The first three of the crackdowns there were minor incidents, however the last, the Urakami Yoban Kuzure in 1869 (the second year of Meiji), was severe.

== Beginning ==
=== The Treaty of Amity and Commerce ===
In the mid 19th century the Edo Shogunate was weakening. In 1854, the United States made the Japan-US Treaty of peace and Amity with it. France and other powerful countries also followed that example. In 1858, at a time the Treaty of Amity and Commerce ( Ansei Treaties) between Japan and France was signed same as with the United States, Great Britain, Russia, and the Netherlands. And diplomatic relations and trade between the two countries began. This treaty led the Shogunate to open several Japanese ports and offer the land to make French settlements. Nagasaki was one of them.

=== Unequal treaty ===
The treaty was unequal and unfavourable to the Japanese side in a number of respects, like extraterritorial jurisdiction, no tariff autonomy, MFN treatment. Moreover, the elimination of these unequal clauses was not only negotiated with one country, but required the consent of all other countries that had accepted MFN treatment. Later on the Meiji Government had have to continue this unequal treaty too. Then the unequal treaties put the new government at a great disadvantage, especially in terms of the economy, and their revision was a major task for the Meiji Government.

=== French Catholic mission ===
In 1838, the Paris Foreign Missions Society was granted authority for the mission to Japan by The Vatican. Fathers Girard and Furet entered the Ryukyu Kingdom (Okinawa). Bernard Petitjean, a French Catholic missionary, was ordered to Japan in 1860. He stayed in Ryukyu for one year and learned Japanese. He landed in Yokohama in November 1862 and went to Nagasaki in 1863. His mission was to provide pastoral care for the French living in the settlement of Ōura.

Later, Petitjean obtained permission under the Treaty of Commerce between Japan and France to build a church for the French living in the settlement on the hilltop overlooking Nagasaki's Nishizaka (the site of the martyrdom of the 26 saints of Japan in 1597). Construction of the church and bishop's palace began in 1864.

=== Ōura Tenshudo ===
The Ōura Tenshudo or Oura Church opened on 19 February 1865. It was a rare Western-style building at the time, so it gained a reputation, and the Japanese living nearby called it the 'French temple' or 'Nanban-temple' and came to see it. Petitjean opened the church to the visiting Japanese and allowed them to visit freely. There was a reason why Petitjean opened the church, which was originally built for the French residents, to curious Japanese visitors and allowed them to see it. There was a slight hope that, as Nagasaki was the land of the Christian martyrs, there might still be believers somewhere, or that some of the Japanese who visited might be believers.

=== Encounter with Hidden Christians ===
On 12 April (old calendar 17 March) of 1865, some villagers of Urakami visited the church. One woman, whose name was "Yuri", age 52, came to close to Father Petitjean and said, "Our heart (faith) is same as yours" as well as "Where is the statue of Santa Maria?" The father was astonished. It was the first time of the emergence of "Hidden Christians" (Kakure Kirishitan) who came to the French Priest, Father Bernard Petitjean. They rejoiced at the image of the Virgin Mary and prayed. The priest was again surprised to hear that they observe 'Kanashimi-setu' (Lent) based on a liturgical calendar passed down orally.

From then on, leaders of the congregation living not only in Urakami, but also in Sotome, Goto, Amakusa and Chikugo-Imamura visited Father Petitjean one after another and asked for his guidance. Father Petitjean instructed them in secret and they returned to their villages to spread his teachings.

=== Persecution ===
However, two years later, in 1867 (the third year of Keio), the existence of the congregation came to light when the congregation in Urakami village refused to hold a Buddhist funeral service. The matter was reported to the Nagasaki Magistrate by the village headman. When summoned to the magistrate's office as representatives of the congregation, Senemon Takagi and others clearly expressed their Christian faith, but the perplexed Nagasaki magistrate returned them to the village. Later on receiving a report from the Nagasaki Magistrate, the Shogunate ordered secret detectives to investigate the congregation in Urakami, and at midnight on 14 July (old calendar: 13 June), the secret gathering place was raided by the shogunate officials, and 68 members of the congregation, including Senemon Takagi, were captured at once. The congregation did not resist and those captured were subjected to severe torture. Later on the number increased to 83. After imprisonment and torture, all but Senemon took a vow to apostatise.

The next day, upon hearing of the incident, the Prussian Minister and French Consul, as well as the Portuguese and American Ministers, immediately protested to the Nagasaki Magistrate, accusing him of an offence against humanity. 21 September(old calendar: 24 August), Leon Roche, the French Minister who had lodged a formal protest, and Shogun Yoshinobu Tokugawa met at Osaka Castle, and they discussed the incident. And the Tokugawa Shogunate relented.

== Meiji era ==
=== Meiji government policy ===
After the dissolution of the Edo Shogunate on 7 March 1868 (old calendar: 14 February), the Meiji Government was established with the emperor at its centre. Nobuyoshi Sawa, a councillor, was ordered to serve as governor-general and was responsible to the court of Nagasaki. In addition, Kaoru Inoue, who became foreign affairs officer, and Masayoshi Matsukata, who became councillor, both arrived in Nagasaki.

When the ban on Christianity was again confirmed in Article 3 of the 'Five Advocates' and the notice presented on 7 April (old calendar: 15 March) by the new government, Sawa and Inoue called the Urakami congregation in question and persuaded them, but found that they had no intention of converting.

On 17 May (old calendar: 25 April), after receiving a proposal from Sawa and Inoue for severe punishment of 'execution of the central figure and exile of the general congregation', the government held an Imperial Council in Osaka to discuss the matter. But Kiyokado Komatsu (Komatsu Kiyokado), in charge of foreign affairs, insisted that the current protests from foreign legations be taken into consideration, which led to the decision to 'exile the congregation'.

=== Reasons for prohibition ===
This decision was met with even more vehement protests at negotiations with foreign ministers the following day. The issue of the Urakami congregation was discussed for six-hour between British Minister Harry Parkes and other government representatives, including Shigenobu Ōkuma. He was a diplomat who had knowledge about Christianity, but he thought it was not good to permit it so rapidly.

The conservative faction within the government, which had once been active in the Emperor Exclusionist movement, did not hide their opposition to Christianity and strongly opposed the repeal of the ban, saying that since Shinto was the national religion-it was natural to exclude foreign religions, and that it was unlikely that the West would immediately accept treaty revisions if Christianity was lifted. The then Japanese ambassador to the US, Arinori Mori, wrote a book entitled "Essay on Religious Freedom in Japan" (日本における宗教の自由) in 1872, in which he stressed the difficulty of continuing the policy of religious prohibition.

=== Deportation ===
Sawa's plan to exile the entire village was approved by an Imperial council on 25 April and implemented in two stages: first the ringleaders to Hagi, Tsuwano and Fukuyama, and then the rest of the village.

On 7 June (old calendar: leap year 17 April), the administrative order indicated the exile of the captured believers, and on 9 July (old calendar: 20 May), Takayoshi Kido visited Nagasaki to discuss the treatment and decided to transfer 114 of the main members of the congregation. From then until 1870 (the third year of Meiji), one after another, the Nagasaki congregation was captured and sent into exile.

Families were split up, and in total 3,414 Christian men, women, and children were sent into exile to twenty different regions in Japan: 500 to Kanazawa, 160 to Tsuwano, 375 to Satsuma, 117 to Tsuru Shima, Okayama, etc.

While their fate, after being exiled, appears to have depended much on the local magistrates, wardens, and other authorities, forced labor and forced conversions were the norm. They were subjected to numerous tortures and private punishment in exile, including water torture, snow torture, ice torture, fire torture, starvation torture, boxing, crucifixion, and torture of children in front of their parents. These methods were just as severe, or even more severe, gruesome and cruel than in the old Shogunate era. About 680 or 20% of them died during their internment in various penal colonies.

== Pression of Christian countries ==
=== Iwakura mission ===
The ministers of the various countries informed their home countries of the situation and repeatedly protested to the Japanese government. The following year, the Iwakura mission, led by Tomomi Iwakura and comprising more than 100 delegations and students, travelled visiting the western countries between 1871 and 1873. Their main objective was to learn about Western civilisation and modern systems, while the other was to pursue preliminary negotiations for the revision of unequal treaties.

As part of the preliminary negotiations for the revision of the Treaty of Inequality, Iwakura was severely criticised by various countries for the inhuman treatment and large-scale capture of Christians in the Nagasaki Bay area, which was then underway, and forced to recognise religious freedom in Japan. In particular, US President Ulysses S. Grant, Queen Victoria of the United Kingdom, and King Christian IX of Denmark had a great influence on them.

In Western countries, newspapers all condemned this malicious outrage and public opinion hardened. These criticisms made the delegates of the mission aware that the suppression of Christianity by the Meiji Government was the greatest obstacle to the revision of the Treaty of Inequality. Moreover, the elimination of these unequal provisions was not only negotiated with one country, but required the consent of all other countries that had accepted MFN treatment.

=== Father Petitjean's effort ===
Regarding their capture in July 1867, Father Petitjean protested to the Shogunate through the legates and consuls of various countries, and in order to report the incident and obtain assistance, he left Yokohama in October of the same year, travelled through France and had an audience with Pope Pius IX in Rome in January 1868 (4th year of Keio). In June of the same year, he returned to Nagasaki with Father Marc Marie de Rotz.

In May 1869 (the second year of Meiji), he went to Rome again to attend the Vatican Council; in January 1870 (3rd year of Meiji), he heard in Rome of the mass exile of about 3,000 Urakami Christians and immediately tried to return to Japan, but was not allowed to do so; he returned in December of the same year and devoted himself to the release of believers.

== Lifting of the ban and homecoming ==
Then the representantes of the mission sent a telegram to Japan to that effect. As a result, on 24 February 1873 (6th year of Meiji), the Government of Meiji removed the ban on Christianity by Grand Council of State (Dajokan) Decree No. 68. Finally this put an end to the prohibition policy against Christianity that had been in place since the early Edo period. On 14 March of the same year, the government issued an order to return Urakami Christians who had been exiled to the various prefectures concerned, and after five years of exile. The surviving believers called the hardship of exile a 'journey' that strengthened their faith, and in 1879, they built a cathedral (Urakami Tenshudo), Immaculate Conception Cathedral, Nagasaki, in Urakami, their homeland.

Finally the Imperial Constitution of Japan, promulgated in 1889 (22nd year of Meiji), subsequently guaranteed freedom of religion by the State. As recently as 2008 ecclesiastical guidance was given in an effort to help overcome the "unrelenting criticism" suffered by apostates and their descendants.

== Torture stone ==
=== Torture stone ===
In a corner of the Urakami Tenshudo complex, there is a 'torture stone' on which believers who were exiled to Hagi, Yamaguchi Prefecture, were made to sit and forced to apostatise. It is believed to be a torture stone that Genshichi Teramoto, a prison chief, brought back to his home as a memorial for the dead.

It was kept by Teramoto's descendants, but was passed on to the Hagi Church in 1990 (second year of Heisei). It was subsequently donated to Urakami Tenshudo as an artefact that tells the story of the 'journey'. These were granite stepping stones, and in the prison, reed screens woven from thicker stems were laid on top of the torture stones, on which all the prisoners were made to sit, tortured and lectured.

The stone is inscribed with a cross; the unveiling of the stone and information board took place on 23 November 2008. The stone was blessed by Cardinal José Saraiva Martins, who was in Nagasaki on behalf of the Pope for the beatification of Peter Kibe and 187 martyrs(1603–1639) on the following 24th.

=== Cold weather torture ===
One of the most severe was the torture of a 22-year-old woman, Tsuru(crane) Iwanaga. She was stripped to her waistcoat and forced to sit shivering on a stone in the cold winter wind. At night, she was returned to prison naked, and by day she was made to sit upright on a stone again. In the first week it snowed so heavily that her body was buried, but she continued to be exposed to the snow, and on the 18th day she collapsed in the snow, but still did not apostatise, so the official gave up on her conversion. She returned to Urakami in 1873 and devoted her life to evangelisation until her death in December 1925 at the Urakami Cross Society.

== Treatment in Kagoshima ==
To Kagoshima (former Satsuma domain), 375 people were placed on board the 'Heiwa Maru' and deported at the end of 1869 (the second year of the Meiji era). The treatment of Christians sent to other regions was appalling, but Kagoshima accepted them with care. They were arranged to live in the abandoned Fukusho-ji Temple, where was the main temple of Simazu Clan for hundreds years. This temple was also the historical site where Francis Xavier, the first Jesuit missionary to land in Kagoshima in 1549, had a conversation with the head priest of the temple.

The clan officials tried to convert them, telling them that if they converted, they would be returned to Nagasaki, and made them stay in private houses to pressure them to convert. However, they were allowed to return to Fukusho-ji Temple to live on their own, and after the initial period of conversion attempts, they were allowed to go to work and earn a living by making sandals, which became known as 'Christian sandals', working at the Shimazu Farm as a milker or making medicine, if they wished to do so. They were treated favourably by the inhabitants of Kagoshima.

Later, on 14 March 1873, 330 people, including 13 born during the four-year stay, were able to return to Nagasaki on the 'Kagoshima Maru'. In addition, 58 people who died of illness during their stay were buried in the 'Christian Cemetery' on the hillside of the ruins of Fukusho-ji Temple.

== Culture ==
The persecution is portrayed in "The Final Martyrs" a short story by Shūsaku Endō, first published in 1959. "Hidden Christian Sites in Nagasaki and the Amakusa Region" was inscripted on UNESCO's World Heritage List in July 2018. It is a group of twelve sites in Nagasaki and Kumamoto Prefecture relating to the history of Christianity in Japan.
