= Sisters of the Child Jesus =

Religious charitable movement

The Sisters of the Child Jesus (French: Soeurs de l'Enfant-Jésus) are religious sisters founded in 1676 in Le Puy-en-Velay, France, by Anne-Marie Martel (1644–1673) to care for those in need. Divided among various independent religious congregations following the same spirit and tradition, they serve around the world. Since 1903, they have used the postnominal initials of R.E.J..

== History ==
=== Foundation ===
Martel, the daughter of a local magistrate, had grown up in affluence and comfort. A deeply spiritual young woman, she desired to find a path in life in keeping with her religious beliefs. After a period of consultation with her spiritual director, the Abbé Louis Trond of the Society of Saint-Sulpice, she undertook the practical expression of her faith by caring for women and instructing them in the faith at a small hospital for destitute women.

She was soon asked to teach catechism to the children of the city who were living on the street. Her example and reputation led other young women to join her in this ministry to the needy. The mission expanded to reach out to the lace-makers working in the factories. By 1669 the number of women sharing this vision had grown to the point that their work had spread throughout the city and into the surrounding villages, and they had begun to live in the community.

Martel died in 1673, at the age of 28, without seeing the formalization of her work into a religious congregation. (The case for her canonization was accepted for study by the Holy See in 2005.) The society of instructors she had founded did not achieve the status of a religious community within the Church until 1676, when under the guidance of a canon of Rheims, John Baptist de la Salle, whom they met after their establishment of a convent there, they received the official approval of Armand de Béthune, the Bishop of Le Puy, as the "Ladies and Girls of Instruction". After the group underwent a formal period of novitiate, they professed a public vow of chastity in 1678. With the exception of the community at Versailles, founded in 1680, most of the various communities, previously independent, merged into the Congregation of the Sisters of the Child Jesus in 1708, and received their first common Rule of Life in 1760.

=== Dispersal and re-establishment ===
The work of the congregation was ended with the French Revolution and the Sisters of the congregation were scattered. This situation did not last long, however, as a new community of Instructors was formed in Le Puy by Mademoiselle de Senicrose.

Soon after that, in 1804, Marie Maisonobe opened a school in Aurillac following the format of the congregation. By 1812 the Catholic Church had re-established itself sufficiently that she was able to begin her formal formation in Puy-en-Velay. This developed into an autonomous congregation in 1843, whose first Superior General was Louise Maisonobe, niece of Marie. This congregation later merged with the Sisters of Providence of Rodez in 1856. They later opened schools in Argentina (1888) and in Belgium in 1903.

Through the work of different foundresses in other cities in France, other autonomous congregations came to develop: Digne (1840), Claveisolles (1858), and Chauffailles (1859).

=== Mission to Canada ===
In 1896 the congregation accepted the request of Pierre-Paul Durieu, O.M.I., the first Bishop of New Westminster in British Columbia, to work with the people of the First Nations. Four sisters of the congregation, under the leadership of Mother Aimée, left Le Puy and traveled to Canada, arriving in Williams Lake. From this time the congregation has taught in various schools and built schools and foundations across western Canada, eventually serving in British Columbia, Saskatchewan, and Manitoba.

=== Reunion ===
After the reorganizations required by the various congregations of the Sisters of the Child Jesus around France about 1920, the desire to re-join developed, in order to better answer the needs of the Sisters' ministries. In 1949 the congregation based in Versailles merged with another that was based in Le Puy. In 1952, the congregations of Le Puy and Aurillac merged to form a single congregation.

== Current status ==
The congregation based in Le Puy has Sisters serving in Argentina, Belgium, Burkina Faso, Canada, Chile, Ecuador, France, Ivory Coast, and Vietnam. They served in Liberia from 1966 to 1992.

The congregation based in Chauffailles remains autonomous and currently has houses in France, Canada, Cambodia (since 2002), and Japan.
