= Immaculate Conception Cathedral, Nagasaki =

Roman Catholic cathedral in Nagasaki, Japan

Immaculate Conception Cathedral (無原罪の聖母司教座聖堂)
- St. Mary's Cathedral
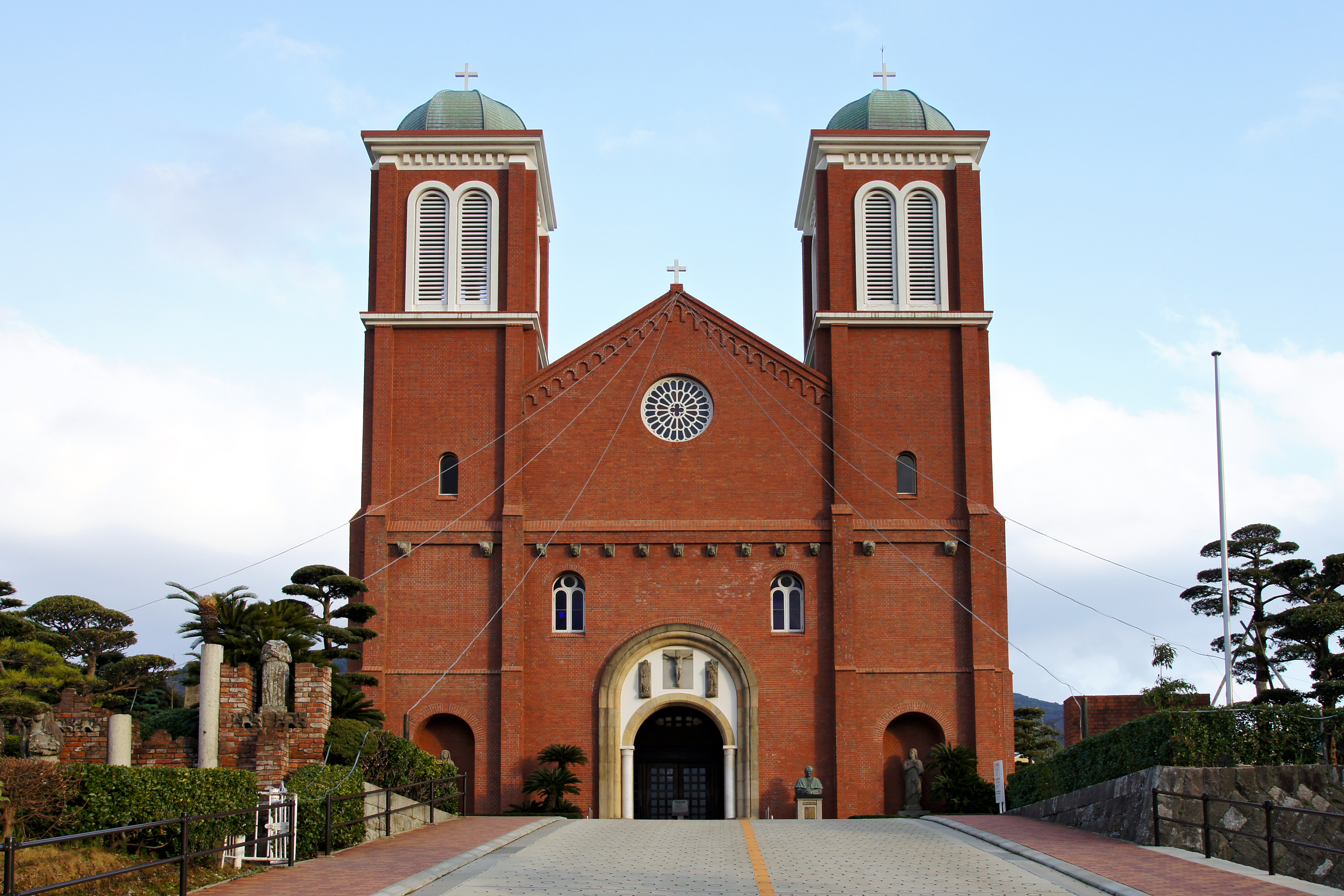
- Urakami Cathedral
- Immaculate Conception Cathedral (無原罪の聖母司教座聖堂)
- 32°46′34″N 129°52′06″E
- Location: 1-79 Motoomachi, Nagasaki
- Country: Japan
- Denomination: Catholic
- Website: Urakami Cathedral

History
- Status: Cathedral
- Founded: 1877

Architecture
- Completed: 1925, 1959
- Demolished: 1945

The Immaculate Conception Cathedral (無原罪の聖母司教座聖堂), also St. Mary's Cathedral, and often known as Urakami Cathedral (浦上天主堂, Urakami Tenshudō; Japanese pronunciation: [ɯ.ɾa.ka.mʲi | teɰ̃.ɕɯ.doː]) after its location Urakami, is a Roman Catholic cathedral located in Motoomachi, Nagasaki, Japan.

== History ==
In 1865, the French priest Bernard Petitjean discovered that almost all the Urakami villagers were Christian. Even then Christianity was forbidden still for the locals, those rediscovered Kakure Kirishitan (Hidden Christians) were persecuted by the then central governments respectively. Between 1869 and 1873, over 3,600 villagers were banished to exile by the newly installed government. During their exile, 650 died. The persecuted came back to their home village after 7 years exile in 1873, and decided to construct their own church.

Construction of the original Urakami Cathedral, a brick Neo-Romanesque building, began in 1895, after a long-standing ban on Christianity was lifted. They purchased the land of the village chief where the humiliating interrogations had taken place for two centuries. The annual "fumi-e" interrogations required those present to tread upon an icon of the Virgin Mary or Jesus. They thought the place was appropriate considering their memory of the long persecution. Construction of the building was started by Father Francine and was completed under the direction of Father Regani. The frontal twin spires stood 64 meters high were constructed in 1875. When completed in 1925 (Taishō 14), until its destruction in 1945, it was the largest Christian structure in the Asia-Pacific region.

The atomic bomb that was dropped on Nagasaki by the United States on August 9, 1945, detonated in Urakami only 500 m (1640 ft) from the cathedral, completely destroying it. As the Feast of the Assumption of Mary (August 15) was near, Mass was held on the day and was well attended. The resultant collapse and heat-wave cindered and buried all those present in the cathedral. The destruction of the cathedral hit the religious community of Nagasaki the hardest, as they viewed it as a loss of spirituality. It had such an impact, that noted playwright Tanaka Chikao wrote his most successful play, Head of Mary, about the efforts of Christians in Nagasaki to reconstitute their faith by rebuilding the Virgin Mary.

The plans to replace the cathedral led to a prolonged debate between the city government and the congregation. The city government had suggested preserving the destroyed cathedral as a heritage site, and offered an alternate site for a new church. However, Christians in Nagasaki strongly wanted to rebuild their cathedral on the original site, as a symbol of their persecution and suffering. In January 1958 the Catholic community announced their intent to build a new, larger cathedral of reinforced concrete on the original site and following the plan of the original cathedral. After further debate the city government accepted this proposal and the new cathedral was finished by October 1959. In 1980 the cathedral was remodeled using brick tiles to more closely resemble the original French style.

Statues and artifacts damaged in the bombing, including a French Angelus bell and the Atom-bombed Mary, are now displayed on the grounds. The nearby Nagasaki Peace Park contains remnants of the original cathedral's walls. What remained of the cathedral is now on display in the Nagasaki Atomic Bomb Museum.

The twin bells of Urakami Cathedral in Nagasaki were restored and rang together again, after one of the missing bells was recovered and repaired by volunteers, for the 80th anniversary of the atomic bombing. An additional bell, donated by American Catholics, was also rung on the 80th anniversary of the atomic bombing.

== Gallery ==
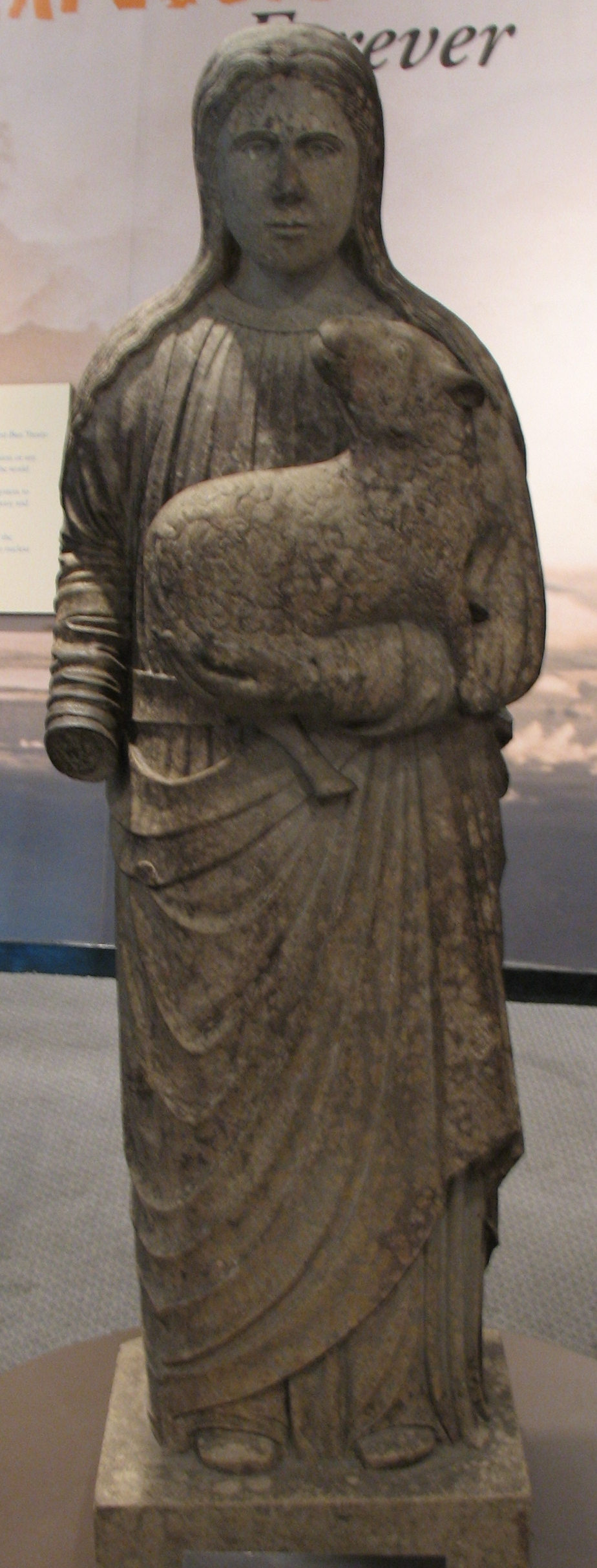
Atomic bombed Agnes of Urakami, displayed at United Nations Headquarters

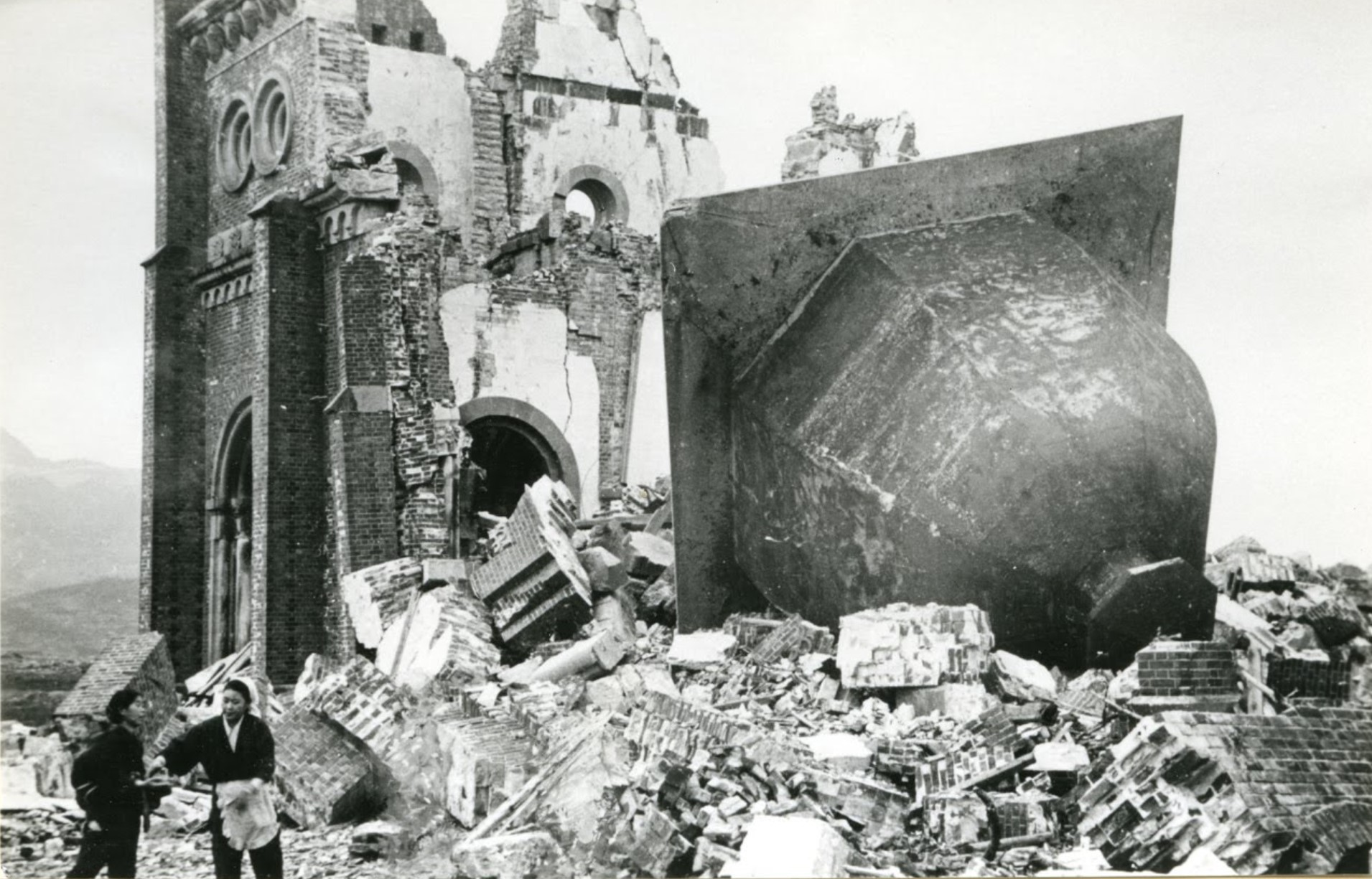
Urakami Cathedral, 7 January 1946

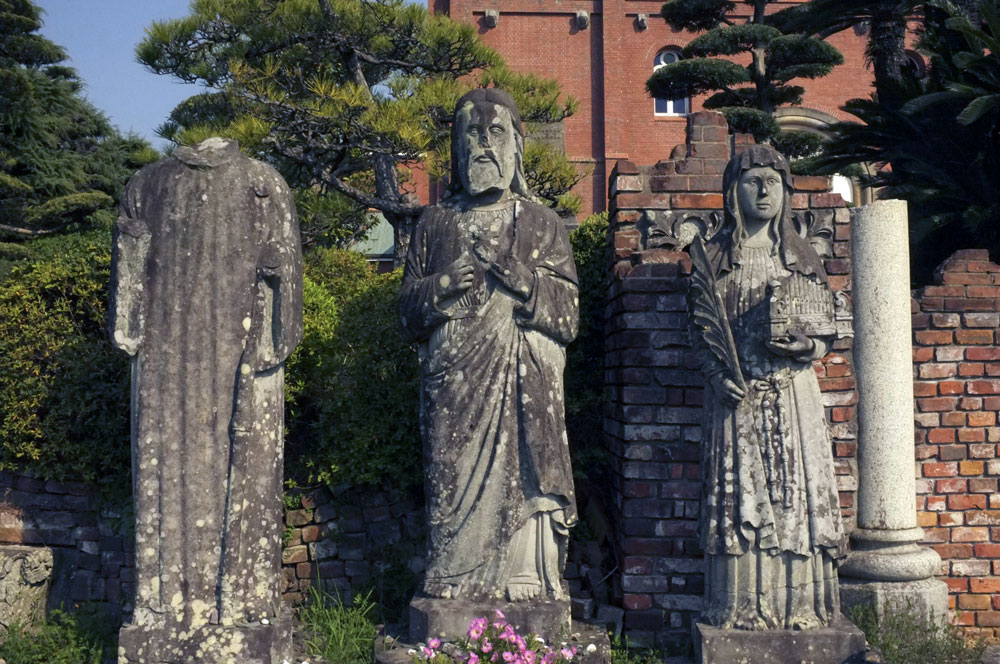
Sculptures destroyed by the atomic bomb with the rebuilt cathedral in the background

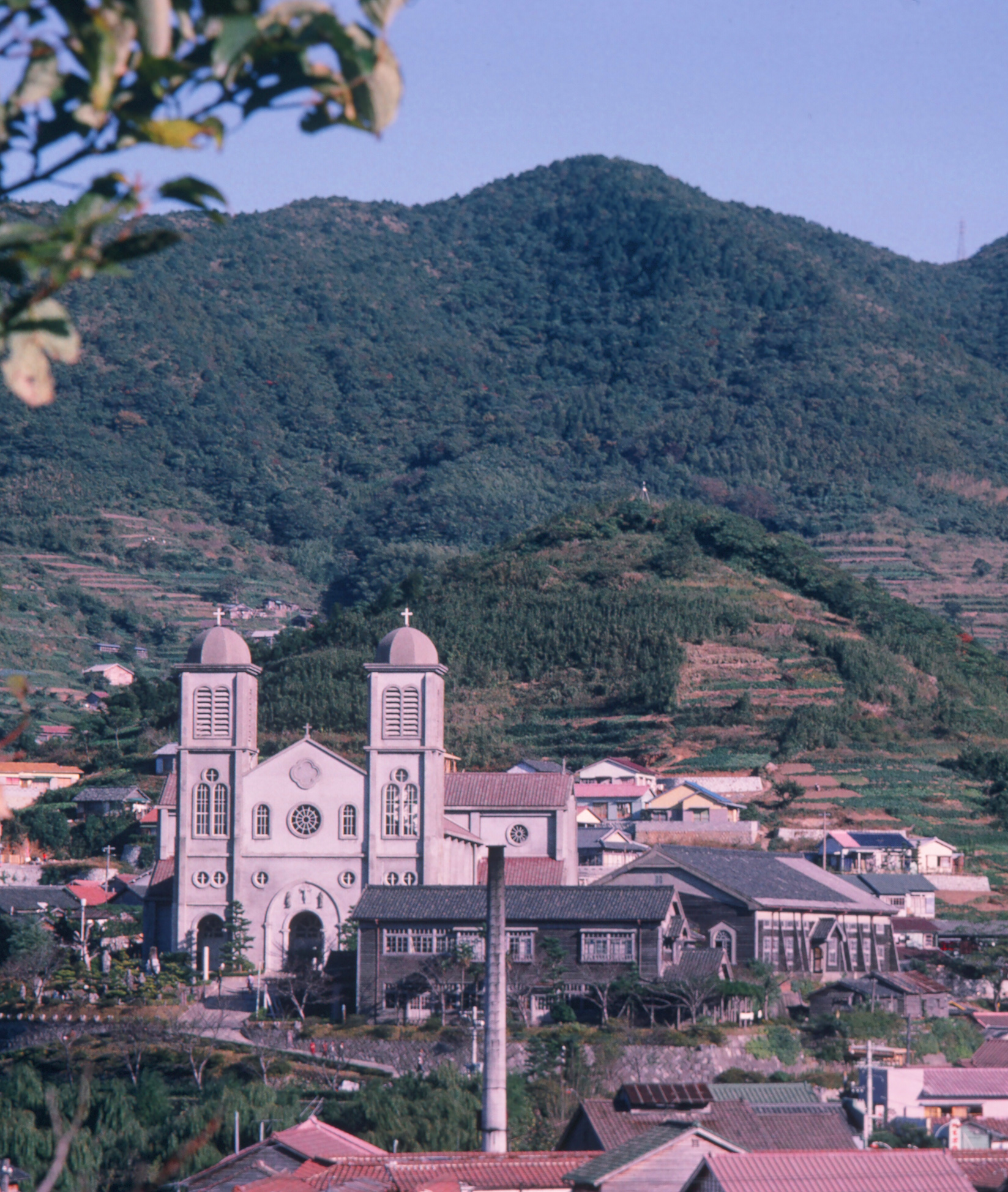
Urakami Cathedral in 1964 (before the 1980 remodeling)

== See also ==
- The Bells of Nagasaki, a book written by Takashi Nagai about the bell of the Cathedral
