= Marc Marie de Rotz =

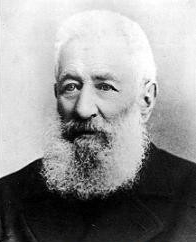
Marc Marie de Rotz

Marc Marie de Rotz (27 March 1840 – 7 November 1914) was a French missionary belonging to the Paris Foreign Missions Society who served in Japan for over 35 years. Upon arriving in Japan in June 1868, de Rotz engaged in missionary and social welfare work in the Sotome region of Nagasaki.

== Life ==
Marc Marie de Rotz was born on 26 March 1840 in Bayeux in Normandy, France to a royal family descended from Napoleon. After receiving strict schooling from his parents, in 1848, he enrolled in the Congregation of Holy Cross school in Orléans.

In 1860, de Rotz enrolled in the seminary in Orléans, and two years later transferred to the Paris Foreign Missions Society seminary. However, due to illness he dropped out of school, returned to his hometown, and enrolled in the seminary in Bayeux. Upon his graduation and ordination there in 1865, he was installed as assistant priest of the Saint Julian Church in Caen. In 1867, he became a member of the Paris Foreign Missions Society.

Around this time, priest Bernard Petitjean, who had been involved in missionary work in Nagasaki, returned to France and was recruiting missionaries who had knowledge of printing techniques. de Rotz responded to Petitjean's call, and in June 1868 went to Japan. After engaging in missionary work in Nagasaki, he was reassigned to Yokohama in 1871. There he published the earliest texts using the lithographic process in Japan. In the same year, he assisted the Sisters of the Infant Jesus in the construction of the Saint Maur International School, the oldest international school in Japan.

In 1873, the Meiji government lifted the nationwide ban on Christianity, allowing the Japanese Christians exiled as a result of the Urakami Yoban Kuzure to return to their homes in Nagasaki. de Rotz took this opportunity to return to Nagasaki and began to publish printed materials. In 1874, an outbreak of dysentery in Iōjima spread to the Urakami region, especially affecting the Christians who had recently been freed from exile. In response, de Rotz tended to them by giving them medicine and advising them on how to avoid contracting the infection.

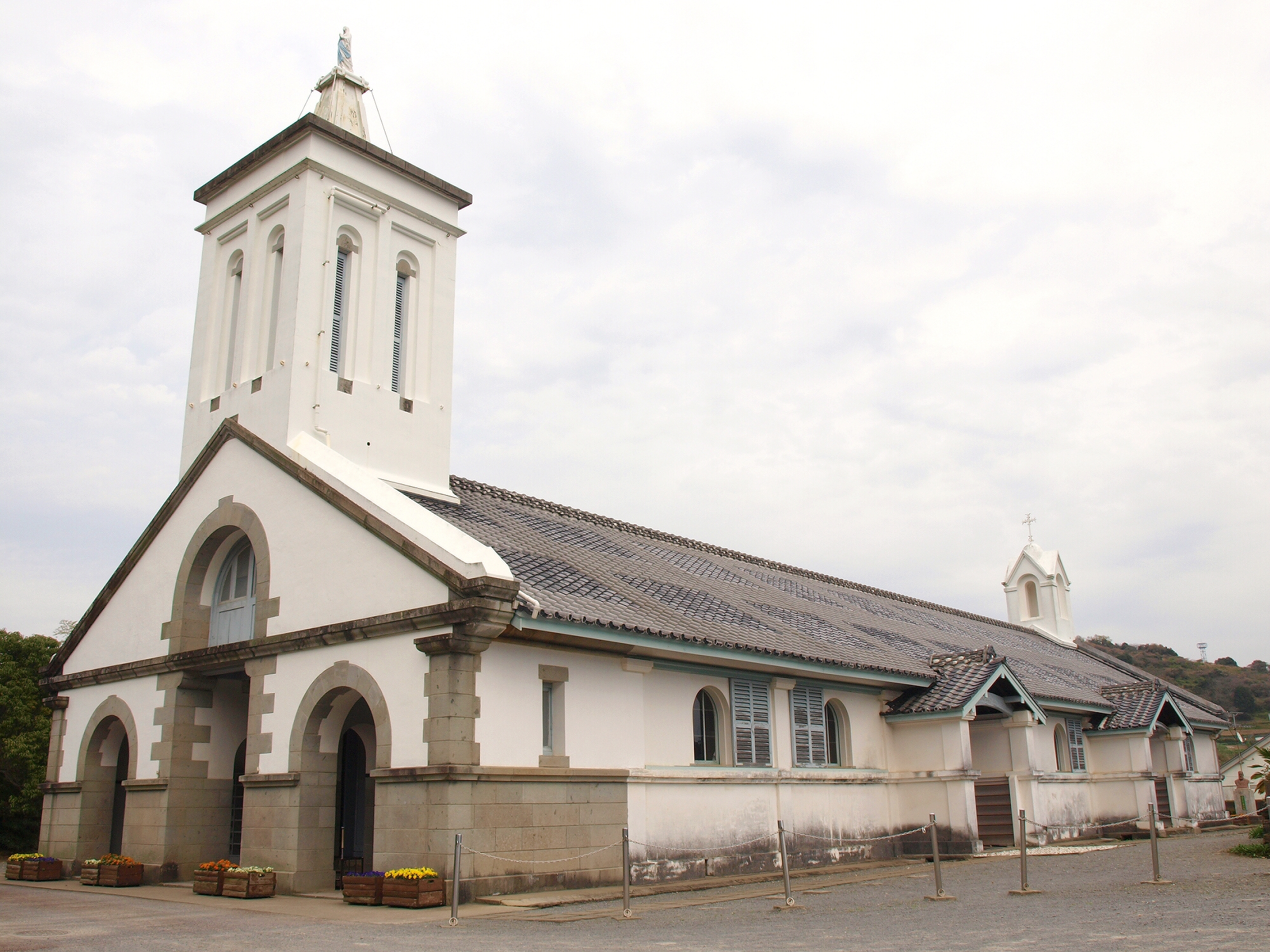
Shitsu Church

In 1878, de Rotz became the head priest of Shitsu Church, ministering to followers who had recently rejoined the Catholic Church as well as Kakure Kirishitan living in the Sotome region. Recognizing the poverty and the high number of orphans in the region, de Rotz established an orphanage in 1880, followed by a relief center in 1883. At the relief center, de Rotz, with the help of a number of Catholic sisters, led the production of woven and knitted fabrics, noodles, macaroni, bread, and soy sauce. Items such as bedsheets and macaroni would be sold to the nearby foreign settlement, while noodles and soy sauce would be sold to the local population. In 1886, de Rotz opened a clinic to help cure those afflicted with infectious diseases.

In 1914, while working on the construction of the Oura Church diocese, de Rotz fell off from the scaffolding and died the following day, November 7. He was buried in a cemetery in Shitsu.

== See also ==
- Paris Foreign Missions Society
- Roman Catholic Archdiocese of Nagasaki
