= Antier =

Antier (or Hanthié) is a French surname. Notable people with the surname include:

- Benjamin Antier (1787–1870), 19th-century French playwright
- Marie Antier (1687–1747), French opera singer
- Reine Antier (1801–83), French Roman Catholic nun
