= Tsuru Shima =

Uninhabited island in Okayama Prefecture, Japan

Coordinates: 34.6931°N 134.324°E

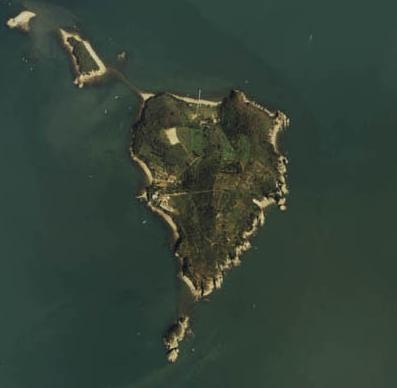
Aerial view

Tsuru Shima (鶴島) is part of Okayama Prefecture, Japan. It is a small, uninhabited island located in the Inland Sea of Japan, hidden from the land by the much larger Kakuijima, and approximately 6 km off the border of Hyōgo and Okayama prefectures. During the early Meiji Period the island was used as a penal colony for Christians. The name means literally "Crane (bird) Island".

== Geography ==
The island is under 400m across. It is roughly triangular with a craggy southeastern side and narrow sandy beaches divided by rocky outcrops on its southwestern and northern shores. A concrete jetty on the northern side and another shorter jetty overlooked by a disused one-room reception building on the southwestern side, are the only signs of previous habitation visible from the sea. Inland there are a few abandoned buildings, all built in the last 50 years or so, which are now falling into ruin. In the northwestern corner of the island there is a well that dates back to the time of the penal colony (in working order at time of writing). The highest point on the island is 49m above sea level. It has an area of 0.1 km^{2} and 2.1 km of coastline.

== History ==
During the Edo period the island was privately owned and uninhabited. In August 1870 (the 3rd year of Meiji), as part of the Urakami Yoban Kuzure, 117 Christians from Nagasaki were exiled to the island and it became a penal colony. On Tsuru Shima during three years of forced labour and forced conversions 18 of the internees perished, 17 of them as martyrs, before religious freedom was granted in 1873 and the prohibition on Christianity was finally lifted. The unhewn headstones marking the graves of those who died can still be found on the hillside above the cliff at the southern tip of the island, along with a stone memorial and cross that have been erected by the local Catholic church. The remains of the small Shinto shrine that was used for the conversions are also still there.

Around the time of Japan’s entry into the Second World War the island was returned to private ownership and planted with Oranges, however the plantation later failed when the pine trees that acted as a windbreak were destroyed by a beetle infestation. The owners then operated a guesthouse on the island until 1990 when it was again left uninhabited.

The former penal colony is now one of Bizen City's designated cultural heritage sites and a pilgrimage is held annually following part of the internees' route, or "the Journey", to the island.

== See also ==
- Desert island
- List of islands
