= Anne-Marie Martel =

- Born: 11 August 1644; Le Puy-en-Velay, Velay, Kingdom of France
- Died: 15 January 1673 (aged 28)
- Occupation: Teacher
- Known for: Founder of the Congrégation des Sœurs de l’Enfant-Jésus

Anne-Marie Martel (11 August 1644 – 15 January 1673) was a French Roman Catholic woman who gave religious instruction to poor women and children in Le Puy-en-Velay, Haute-Loire. She attracted other women who formed a teaching congregation, which was officially recognized by the church after her death and is now the Congrégation des Sœurs de l’Enfant-Jésus.

== Life ==
The story of Anne-Marie Martel is known only from the notes of Antoine Tronson, the priest of Saint-Sulpice who was her confessor. She was born in Le Puy-en-Velay on 11 August 1644. Her father was a magistrate. She was born at a time when Catholicism had triumphed after the French Wars of Religion. The king and the Parlement of Paris were taking care to preserve the independence of the Gallican Church, and the country was swept by a wave of religious feeling. Anne-Marie Martel was strongly influenced by the priests of Saint-Sulpice who had founded the Seminary of Le Puy and were in charge of the parish church of Saint-Georges, today the chapel of the Grand-Séminaire du Puy.

Anne-Marie Martel was a devout woman, and in 1666 her confessor invited her to minister to destitute women. She visited the sick women of the Aiguilhe hospital, and taught them about God and the Christian life. A year later she was asked to teach the catechism to street children. With a companion, Catherine Felix, she taught the children and young people of the St Laurent district, and then in the St Jean district, where there were many lace makers. Anne-Marie Martel was joined by other women, including the lace makers, who taught and gave religious instruction in Le Puy and surrounding communities. The women formed groups called Assemblies in the city and the countryside. They included the married Demoiselles de l'Instruction and the single Filles de l'Instruction, called Béates by the people. Anne-Marie Martel died on 15 January 1673, exhausted by illness.

== Legacy ==
In 1676 the congregation that Anne-Marie Martel had founded was officially recognized. It took the name Ladies of Instruction of the Child Jesus (Dames de l’Instruction du Saint-Enfant-Jésus) in 1708, and its first Rule was adopted in 1730. The Congrégation des Sœurs de l’Enfant-Jésus is present in France, Belgium, Argentina, Chile, Ecuador, Canada, Burkina Faso and Vietnam. Reine Antier (1801–1883) attended the Société de l'Instruction du Saint-Enfant-Jésus du Puy, where her sister was a religious sister who later became Mother Superior. She founded the associated Congrégation des Soeurs de l'Enfant-Jésus de Chauffailles, an order of teaching nuns.

In 2005 the Diocese of Le Puy submitted Anne-Marie Martel's name to the Vatican to start the process of beatification. There is a Lycée Polyvalent Privé Anne Marie Martel in Le Puy-en-Velay on the Rue Anne-Marie Martel.

== Sources ==
- Anne-Marie Martel (1644 – 1673) (PDF) (in French), Service Nationale de la Pastorale Liturgique et Sacramentelle
- Anne-Marie Martel, Sisters of the Child Jesus
- Boufflet, Joachim (25 February 2009), Anne-Marie Martel: simple et fervente (in French)
- Les Soeurs de l'Enfant Jésus (in French), Diocèse du Puy-en-Velay, 8 March 2004
- "Lycée Polyvalent Privé Anne Marie Martel", LÉTUDIANT (in French)
- Sirois, Georgette (25 March 2010), "Reine Antier (1801-1883) – Femme de foi et d'audace", Femmes et Ministères (in French)
