= Laussonne =

- Commune
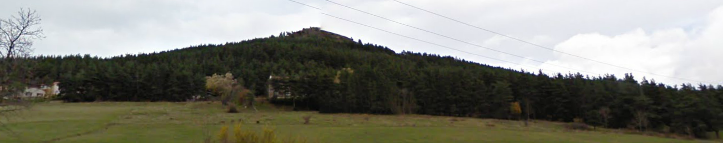
- Suc de Montchamp
- Location of Laussonne
- Location within France Location within Auvergne-Rhône-Alpes
- Coordinates: 44°58′15″N 4°03′10″E
- Country: France
- Region: Auvergne-Rhône-Alpes
- Department: Haute-Loire
- Arrondissement: Le Puy-en-Velay
- Canton: Mézenc

Government
  - Mayor (2020–2026): Fernand Chaize
- Area^{1}: 25.11 km^{2} (9.70 sq mi)
- Elevation: 929 m (3,048 ft)
- Highest elevation: 1,191 m (3,907 ft)
- Lowest elevation: 796 m (2,612 ft)
- Population (2023): 1,011
  - Density: 40.26/km^{2} (104.3/sq mi)
- Time zone: UTC+01:00 (CET)
  - Summer (DST): UTC+02:00 (CEST)
- INSEE/Postal code: 43115 /43150
- ^{1} French Land Register data, which excludes lakes, ponds, glaciers > 1 km^{2} (0.386 sq mi or 247 acres) and river estuaries.

Laussonne (French pronunciation: [losɔn]; Occitan: Laussona) is a commune in the Haute-Loire department in south-central France.

== Population ==
Historical population
Year	Pop.	±% p.a.
1968	1,124	—
1975	1,052	−0.94%
1982	1,040	−0.16%
1990	1,063	+0.27%
1999	991	−0.78%
2007	991	+0.00%
2012	1,011	+0.40%
2017	1,010	−0.02%
2023	1,011	+0.02%
Source: INSEE

== Personalities ==
- Reine Antier (1801–83), founder of the Congrégation des Soeurs de l'Enfant-Jésus de Chauffailles, an order of teaching nuns.

== See also ==
- Communes of the Haute-Loire department
