= Seibo Kitamura =

Japanese sculptor (1884–1987)

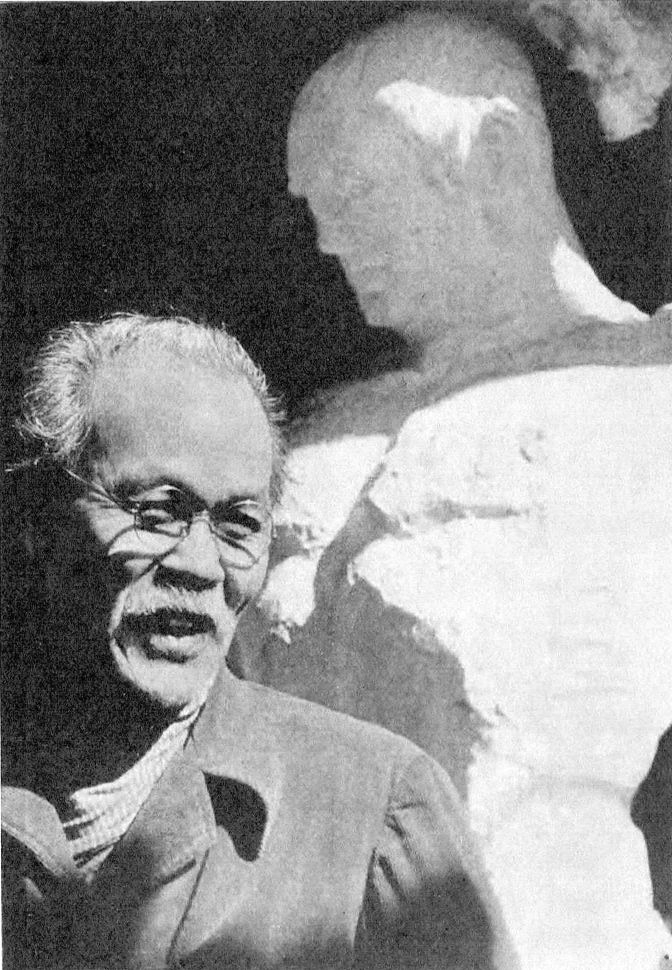
Seibo Kitamura (1953)

Seibo Kitamura (北村 西望, Kitamura Seibō; 16 December 1884 – 4 March 1987) was a Japanese sculptor. He is known as the sculptor of the 10-meter-tall Peace Statue in Nagasaki Peace Park. He is most often referred to as "Seibo".

== Biography ==
He was born in what was then Minamiarima, Nagasaki, (now Minamishimabara) on 16 December 1884 and entered Kyoto City University of Arts to study sculpture in 1903. He graduated from there in 1907 and immediately enrolled in the Tokyo School of Fine Arts, from which he received a second sculpture degree in 1912. He began sculpting full-time after his discharge from military service in 1915 and, by 1921, he was a professor at the Tokyo School of Fine Arts. He was inducted into the Japan Art Academy in 1925.

Kitamura submitted some of his work into an unknown event of the "Mixed Sculpturing" category of the art competitions at the 1932 Summer Olympics, but did not win a medal. He is known as the sculptor of the 13-meter-tall Peace Statue in Nagasaki Peace Park. The statue and the park are near the hypocentre where the atomic bomb exploded on 9 August 1945. The design for the statue was selected in an open contest, and unveiled to the public on 1 April 1955 when the park opened. The statue points to the sky, warning from where the bomb and death would fall, his left hand is stretched out in a gesture of peace, and his eyes are closed in prayer for the souls of those who died. One leg is folded in a position of meditation, but his left foot is on the ground, as he is prepared to stand and assist the people. The statue and park are a memorial to the people of Nagasaki who died in the atomic bomb explosion.

Kitamura has received numerous other local and national awards for his work throughout his lifetime. He died on 4 March 1987 in Tokyo at the age of 102. Many of his works can be viewed at Shimabara Castle, where the yagura is a museum dedicated to his life and work.
