= Hiroshima National Peace Memorial Hall for the Atomic Bomb Victims =

Memorial in Hiroshima, Japan

Coordinates: 34.39333°N 132.45349°E

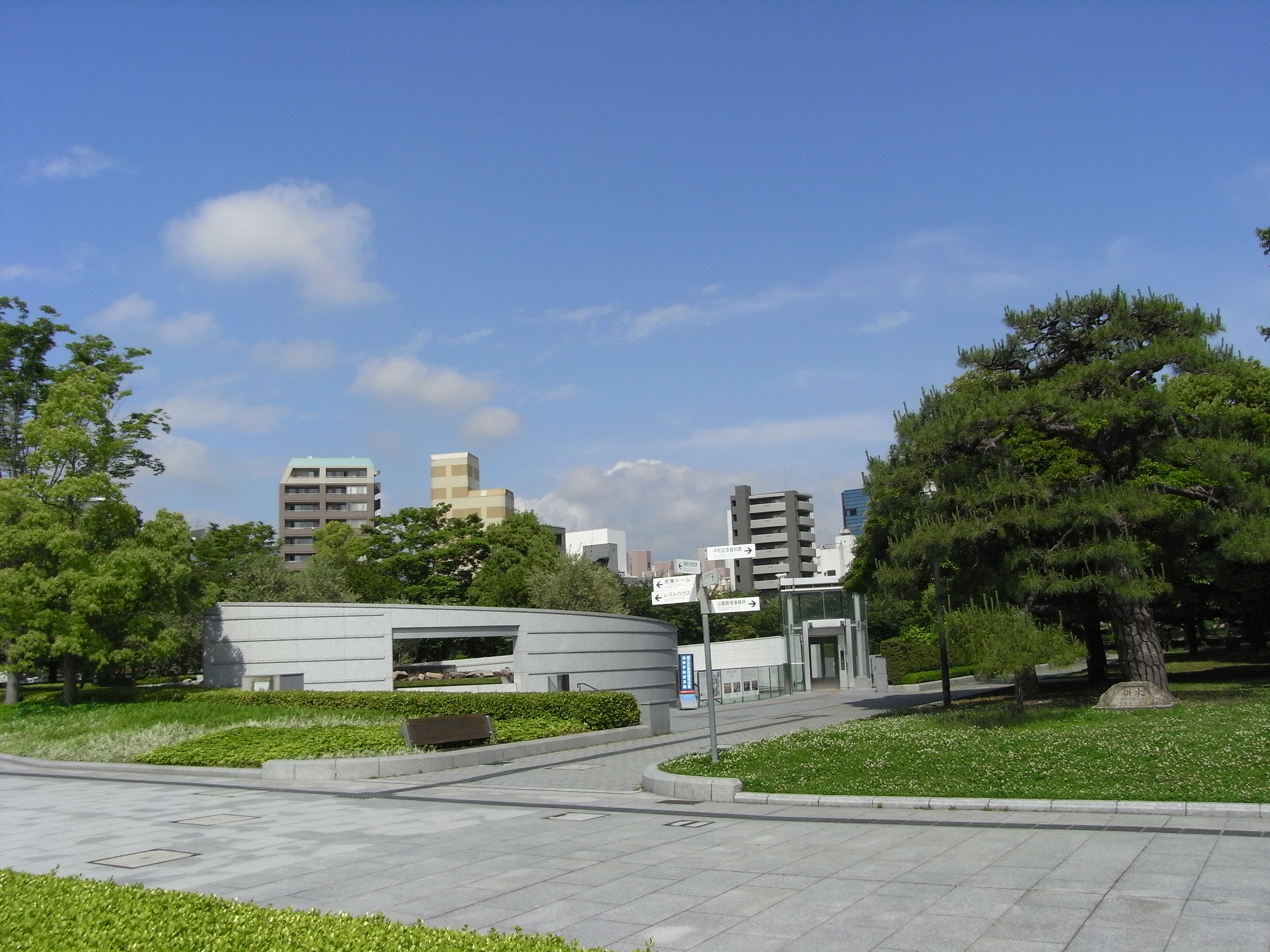
Hiroshima National Peace Memorial Hall for the Atomic Bomb Victims

Hiroshima National Peace Memorial Hall for the Atomic Bomb Victims is one of the National Memorial Halls in Hiroshima, Japan.

== Overview ==
The Hall was founded by the Japanese national government to mourn the atomic bomb victims in 2002. It was designed by Kenzō Tange. There is another National Peace Memorial Hall for the Atomic Bomb Victims in Nagasaki built for the same purpose.

The Hall is in Hiroshima Peace Memorial Park near Hiroshima Peace Memorial across the Motoyasu River by the Motoyasu Bridge. The Hall curators are collecting atomic bomb memories and stories from the survivors to mourn the victims, as the survivors are aging. They are also collecting names and photographs of atomic bomb victims for the same purpose and for the same reason. From the collection, they are developing a project to read the stories of the atomic bombing.

Admission is free of charge.

== See also ==
- Atomic bombings of Hiroshima and Nagasaki
- Hiroshima Peace Memorial Park
- Hiroshima Peace Memorial
- Hiroshima Witness
- Nagasaki National Peace Memorial Hall for the Atomic Bomb Victims
