= Nagasaki National Peace Memorial Hall for the Atomic Bomb Victims =

Memorial monument in Nagasaki, Japan

Coordinates: 32°46′22″N 129°51′54″E

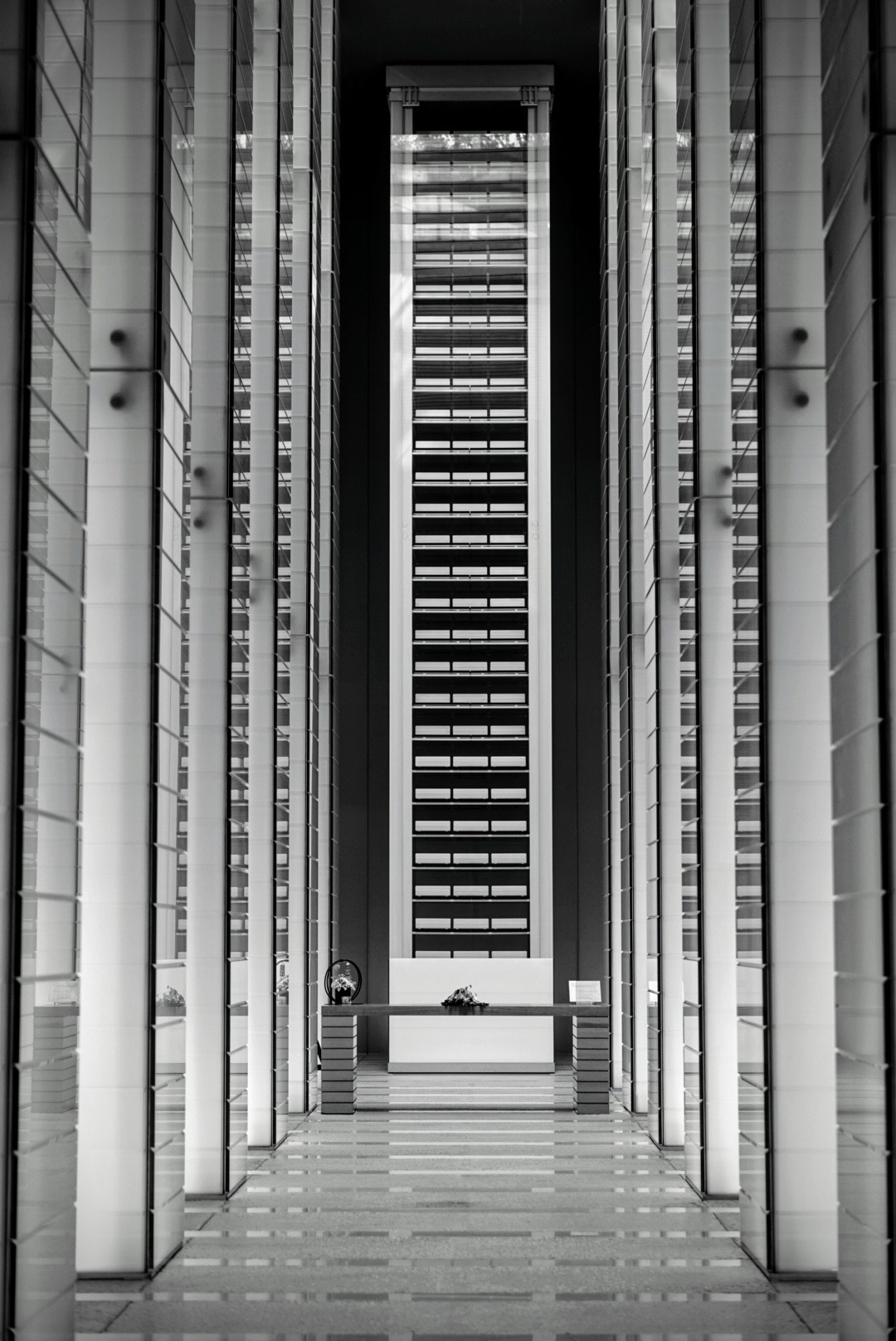
The Remembrance Hall

Map

The Nagasaki National Peace Memorial Hall for the Atomic Bomb Victims (国立長崎原爆死没者追悼平和祈念館, Kokuritsu Nagasaki Genbaku Shibotsusha Tsuitō Heiwa Kinenkan) is a commemorative monument in Nagasaki, Japan, situated next to its Atomic Bomb Museum. The Peace Park is nearby.

Like its counterpart in Hiroshima, the hall was constructed as a place to remember and pray for those who died in the 1945 atomic bombing, with photos, memoirs and personal accounts of the event. It also offers information on international co-operation and exchange activities concerning medical treatment for sufferers of nuclear accidents.

== Overview ==
Glass walls of the memorial hall

Designed by architect Akira Kuryu, the memorial was constructed between November 2000 and December 2002. The subterranean interior of the building contains a reference area, a large conference room, an anteroom with a bank of monitors showing photographs of the victims, and a stylized remembrance hall in which 12 pillars of light symbolize hope for peace. An upper level serves as an abbreviated tour, with diary excerpts and a viewing station allowing visitors to view the Remembrance Hall from above. As viewed from the outside, the top of the memorial consists mainly of a tree-lined basin of water through which the 12 pillars of light continue to rise from below. At night, 70,000 fiber optic lights are illuminated across the surface of the water, symbolizing the victims.

The foundation also tours internationally, holding anti-nuclear displays in cities around the world. The 2005 exhibition was held at the Peace Museum in Chicago, coinciding with the 60th anniversary of the bombing as well as a conference in New York which reviewed the Nuclear Non-Proliferation Treaty. In 2007, the exhibition was held in Guernica, Spain, which was heavily bombed by the Luftwaffe in April 1937.

== See also ==
- Hiroshima rages, Nagasaki prays
- World War II
