= Nagasaki Peace Park =

Park located in Nagasaki, Japan

- 長崎平和公園
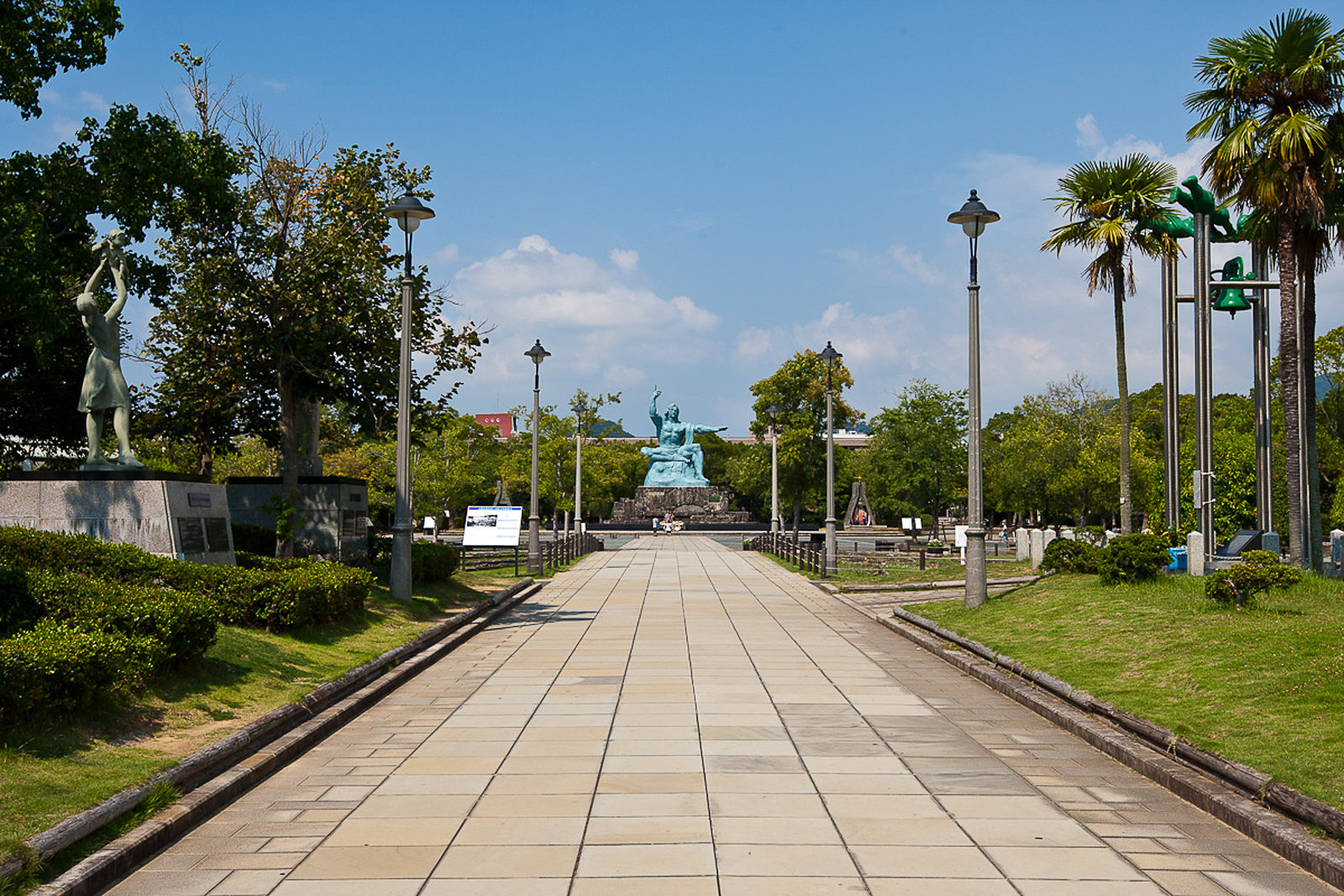
- Nagasaki Peace Park and the Peace Statue
- Interactive map of Nagasaki Peace Park
- Location: Nagasaki, Japan
- Coordinates: 32.7757°N 129.8632°E
- Designer: Seibo Kitamura
- Type: International Memorial Park
- Height: 10 metres (33 ft)
- Opening date: April 1, 1955
- Dedicated to: Victims of the atomic bomb explosion on August 9, 1945

Nagasaki Peace Park is a park located in Nagasaki, Japan, commemorating the atomic bombing of the city on August 9, 1945 during World War II. It is next to the Atomic Bomb Museum and near the Peace Memorial Hall.

== History ==
Established in 1955, and near to the hypocenter of the explosion, remnants of a concrete wall of Urakami Cathedral can still be seen. Urakami Cathedral was the grandest church in east Asia at the time. At the park's north end is the 10-meter-tall Peace Statue created by sculptor Seibo Kitamura of Nagasaki Prefecture. The statue's right hand points to the threat of nuclear weapons while the extended left hand symbolizes eternal peace. The mild face symbolizes divine grace and the gently closed eyes offer a prayer for the repose of the bomb victims' souls. The folded right leg and extended left leg signify both meditation and the initiative to stand up and rescue the people of the world. The statue represents a mixture of western and eastern art, religion, and ideology. Installed in front of the statue is a black marble vault containing the names of the atomic bomb victims and survivors who died in subsequent years.

A plaque by the Peace Statue is titled Words from the Sculptor and reads:

After experiencing that nightmarish war,
that blood-curdling carnage,
that unendurable horror,
Who could walk away without praying for peace?
This statue was created as a signpost in the
struggle for global harmony.
Standing ten meters tall,
it conveys the profundity of knowledge and
the beauty of health and virility.
The right hand points to the atomic bomb,
the left hand points to peace,
and the face prays deeply for the victims of war.
Transcending the barriers of race
and evoking the qualities of Buddha and God,
it is a symbol of the greatest determination
ever known in the history of Nagasaki
and the highest hope of all mankind.

— Seibo Kitamura (Spring 1955)

== Plaque ==
A plaque at the nearby hypocenter gives the following account and statistics of the damage caused that day.

At 11:02 A.M., August 9, 1945 an atomic bomb exploded 500 meters above this spot. The black stone monolith marks the hypocenter.
The fierce blast wind, heat rays reaching several thousand degrees and deadly radiation generated by the explosion crushed, burned, and killed everything in sight and reduced this entire area to a barren field of rubble.
About one-third of Nagasaki City was destroyed and 150,000 people killed or injured and it was said at the time that this area would be devoid of vegetation for 75 years. Now, the hypocenter remains as an international peace park and a symbol of the aspiration for world harmony.

DAMAGE CAUSED BY THE ATOMIC BOMB EXPLOSION
1. Leveled Area:	6.7 million square meters (2.59 square miles)
2. Damaged Houses:
Completely burned:	11,574
Completely destroyed:	1,326
Badly damaged:	5,509
Total structures damaged:	18,409
3. Casualties:
Killed:	73,884
Injured:	74,909
Total:	148,793

(Large numbers of people have died in the following years from the effects of radioactive poisoning.)

== Peace Memorial Ceremony ==
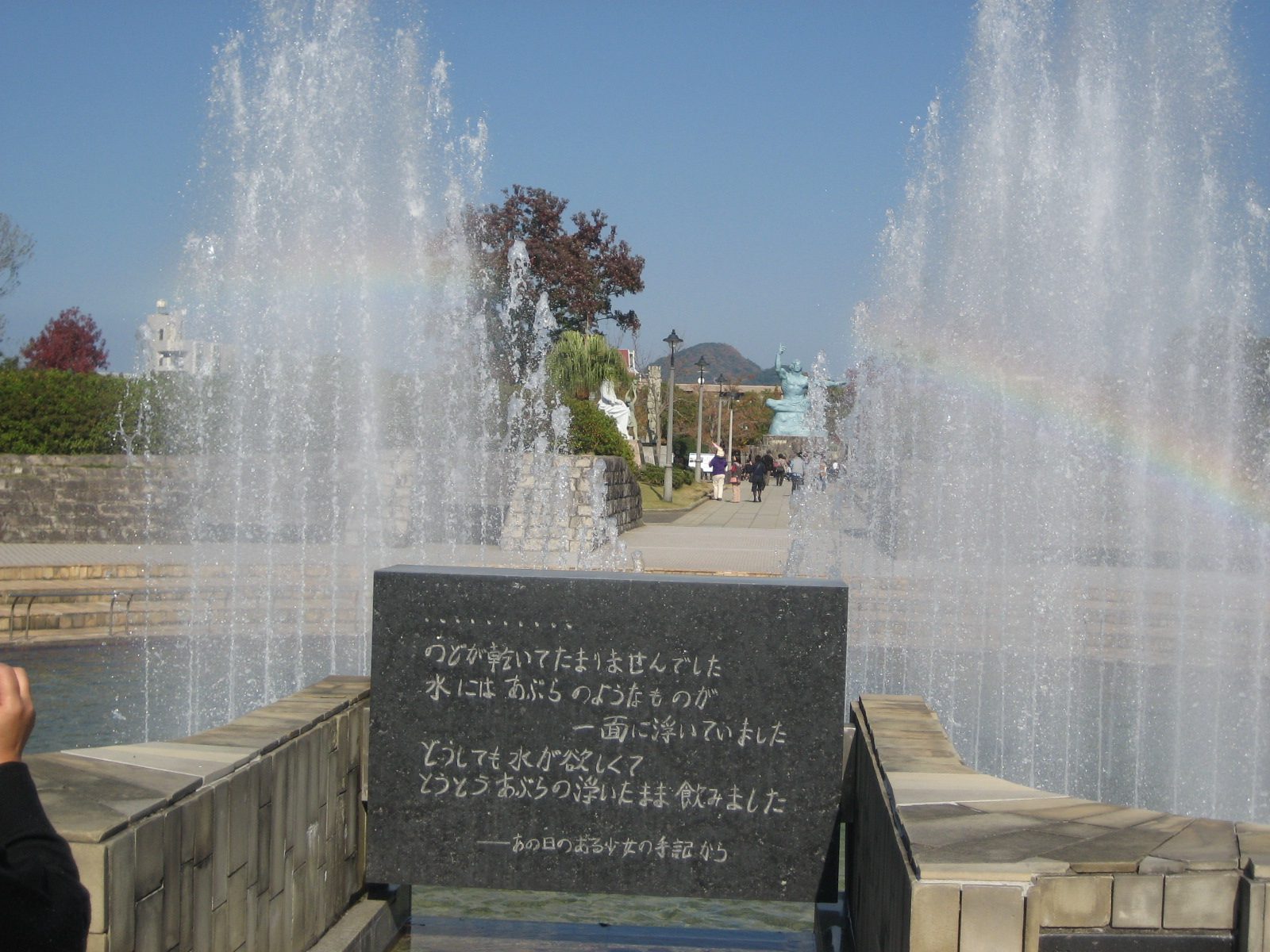
Fountain of Peace in Nagasaki Peace Park with Peace Statue in the background

Every year, on 9 August, the anniversary of the atomic bombing, a Peace Memorial Ceremony is held in front of the statue and the Mayor of Nagasaki delivers a Peace Declaration to the World.

At the south end of the park is a "Fountain of Peace". This was constructed in August, 1969, as a prayer for the repose of the souls of the many atomic bomb victims who died searching for water, and as a dedication to world peace. Lines from a poem by a girl named Sachiko Yamaguchi, who was nine at the time of the bombing, are carved on a black stone plaque in front of the fountain. It reads: "I was thirsty beyond endurance. There was something oily on the surface of the water, but I wanted water so badly that I drank it just as it was."

In 2024, on the eve of the 79th anniversary of the bombing, ambassadors from all members of the G7 as well as the European Union announced that they will be skipping the ceremony due to Israel's exclusion, instead sending representatives, citing fears of politicization of the ceremony in light of the ongoing Gaza war. The Mayor of Nagasaki City, Shiro Suzuki, justified his decision to exclude Israel (as well as Russia and Belarus, who are involved in the invasion of Ukraine) in an interview with the Mainichi Shimbun stating that "something might happen if we invite participants of a conflict where the ceremony cannot proceed peacefully and solemnly". This was in contrast to Hiroshima City which had invited the Israeli Ambassador to its ceremony held three days prior.

Of the G7 members' ambassadors that skipped the 2024 ceremony, the British and American ambassadors, together with the Israeli Ambassador, attended a memorial service on that day held at Zojoji in Tokyo.

== Peace Symbols Zone ==
In 1978, the city of Nagasaki established a "Peace Symbols Zone" on both sides of the park and invited donations of monuments from different countries around the world. The following monuments can be seen in the park:

- "Relief of Friendship" from Porto, Portugal (Nagasaki's sister city), 1978; the plaque reads: "Homage of the City of Porto to the Atomic Victims of the Sister city of Nagasaki--November 1978."
- "Joy of Life" from Czechoslovakia, (donated to Nagasaki in 1980). The bronze statue 260 cm in height was made by Czech sculptor Jan Hána (1927–1994) in 1975; the plaque reads: "It shows a jubilant mother lifting up her baby in her arms."
- "A Call" from Bulgaria, 1980; the plaque reads: "The sculpture symbolizes the struggle of youth in search of peace and harmony, showing a woman with her arms stretched up."
- "Monument of People's Friendship" from the former German Democratic Republic, 1981; the plaque reads: "The sculpture symbolizes the efforts for peace and a happy future of mankind, for the friendship among the peoples."
- "Protection of Our Future" from the city of Middelburg, The Netherlands (Nagasaki's sister city), 1983; the plaque reads: "The statue shows a mother protecting her infant child from danger, representing that we must protect not only the present generation but also the coming generation as well so that the people of the world can live in peace together."
- "Peace" ("Mir") by Mikhail Anikushin from the Union of Soviet Socialist Republics, 1985; the plaque reads: "It shows a mother holding her infant child as an expression of love and peace."
- "Maiden of Peace" from the People's Republic of China, 1985; the plaque reads: "It expresses the sincere aspiration of the Chinese people for human love and the everlasting friendship between Japan and the People's Republic of China."
- "Flower of Love and Peace" from Poland, 1986; the plaque reads: "Like a phoenix reborn from the ashes, like a flower grown out of stone, mankind affirms its existence when peace reigns over the Earth."
- "Hymn to Life" from the City of Pistoia, Italy, 1987; the plaque reads: "The statue, which depicts a mother holding her baby high in the air with both hands, is an expression of love and peace."
- "Sun Crane of Peace" from the Republic of Cuba, 1988; the plaque reads: "The faces of the atomic bomb victims contained within the sun form a paper crane and symbolize the vital importance of peace."
- "Monument of Peace" from Santos, Brazil (Nagasaki's sister city), 1988; the plaque reads: "It is preserved here as an expression of the aspiration for perpetual world peace embraced by the people of Brazil."
- "Infinity" from Ankara, Republic of Turkey, 1991; the plaque reads: "The figure of a man and woman joined hand in hand symbolize peace and harmony among the entire human race."
- "Constellation Earth" from St. Paul, Minnesota, USA (Nagasaki's sister city), 1992; the plaque reads: "The seven human figures represent continents. The interdependence of the figures symbolizes global peace and solidarity."
- "Triumph of Peace over War" from San Isidro, Argentina, 1996; the plaque reads: "The parts of the sculpture other than the red sphere symbolize the chaos and death of war, while the red sphere at the top signifies the ultimate triumph of life."
- "Cloak of Peace (Te Korowai Rangimarie)", by Kingsley Baird from New Zealand, 2006.; the plaque reads: "The statue symbolizes consolation, protection, and solidarity. It also expresses ambivalence, reflecting conflicting interpretations of historical events."
- "Tree of Life: Gift of Peace" (Punu Wankalpainya: Kalypa Nyinanytjaku) from Australia, unveiled 18 April 2016; the sculpture of a bronze tree cradling a ceremonial piti (dish) originates in the Anangu communities of Yalata and Oak Valley/Maralinga in South Australia. The plaques which are in Pitjantjatjara, Japanese and English, read "The tree gives life to make the piti (dish) that is used for carrying food, water, and babies. It represents the sharing of resources between families, communities and nations for peace and harmony." The sculpture also recognises atomic survivors worldwide.
- Monument to Commemorate Chinese Victims of the Atomic Bombing
- Monument for Korean Atomic Victims

The Monument for Korean Atomic Victims is located in Nagasaki Peace Park in Nagasaki, Japan. At the time of the atomic bombing in Nagasaki, there were many people of nationalities other than Japanese that were living in the area. There were an estimated 12,000 to 14,000 Koreans living in Nagasaki during the bombing. It is believed that up to 2,000 of them died because of the atomic bomb. At the time, many of those Koreans were being used as forced labor as a part of the Japanese war effort. This monument commemorates the Korean victims and serves as a message asking for peace in the world, an abolition of nuclear weapons, and a peaceful reunification of the Korean nation. The Monument for Korean Atomic Victims was unveiled on August 9, 1979.

=== Photos ===
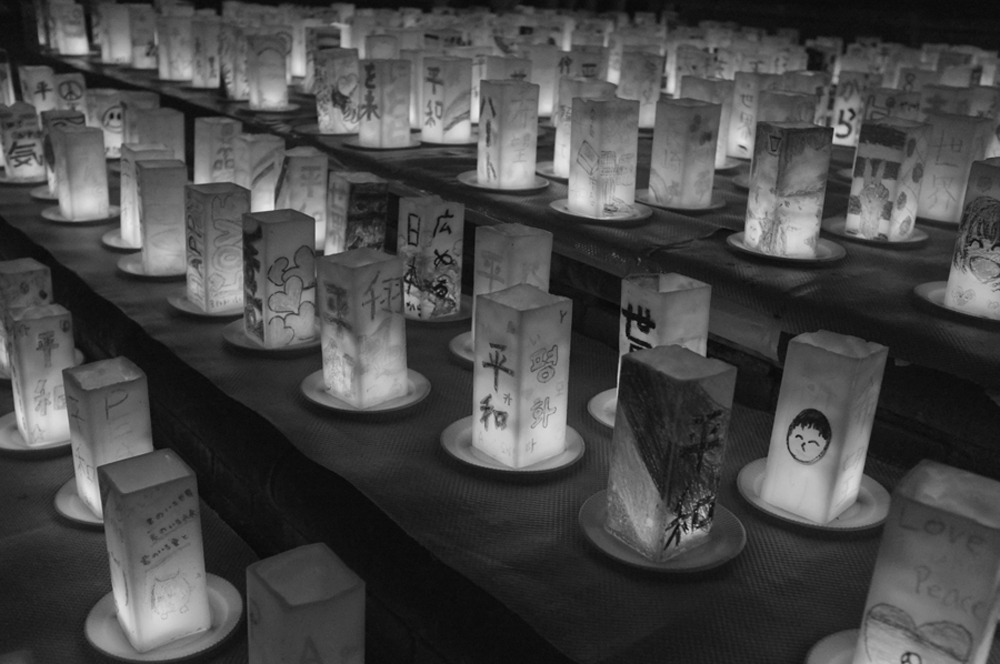
67th Anniversary of the Atomic Bomb Attack on Nagasaki - Peace Park, Nagasaki-shi, Japan 2014

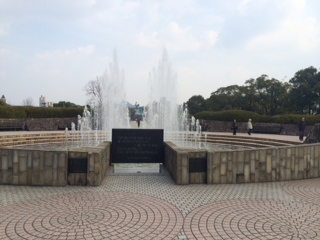
Far away view of the Peace Statue

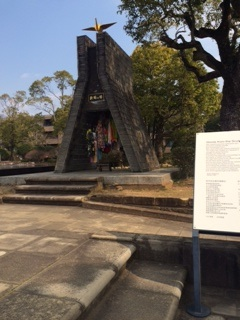
Side sculptures with Japanese cranes

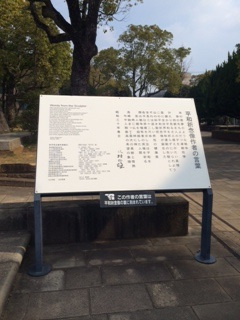
Sculptor notes and sculpture description

== In film ==
The park was shown in the 1991 Akira Kurosawa film Rhapsody in August, in which a Japanese child points out that there is no sculpture in the Peace Symbols Zone from the United States. "Constellation Earth" was donated in 1992, a year after the film's release, after this omission was noted by St. Paul mayor James Schiebel during a trip to Nagasaki in 1990.

== See also ==
- Atomic bombings of Hiroshima and Nagasaki
- Hiroshima Peace Memorial Park
- Children's Peace Monument
- Honkawa Elementary School Peace Museum
- Fukuromachi Elementary School Peace Museum
- Hiroshima rages, Nagasaki prays
