= Monument to Commemorate Chinese Victims of the Atomic Bombing =

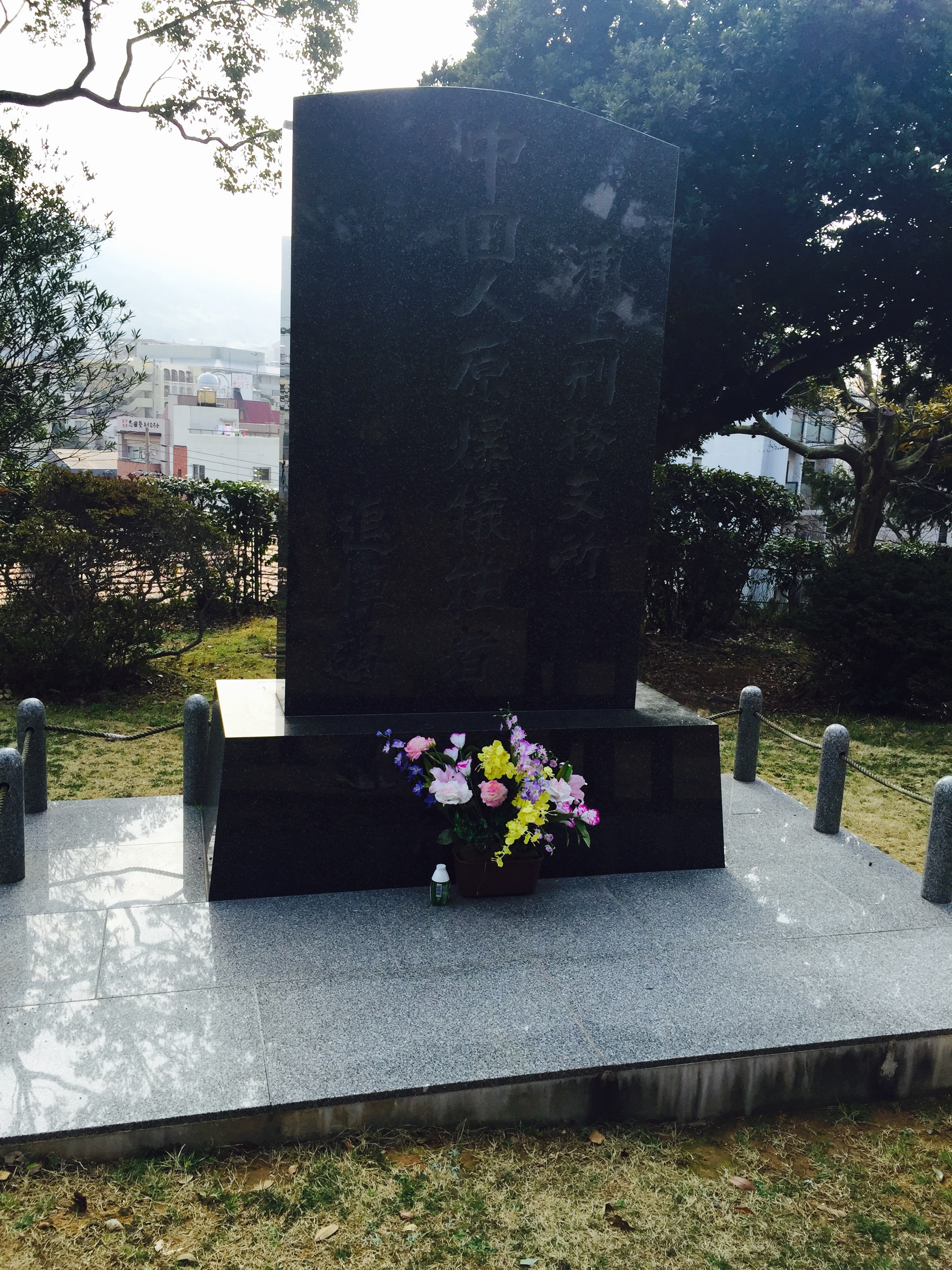
- Location: Nagasaki Peace Park, Nagasaki, Japan
- Opening date: July 7, 2013
- Dedicated to: Chinese victims of atomic bombing

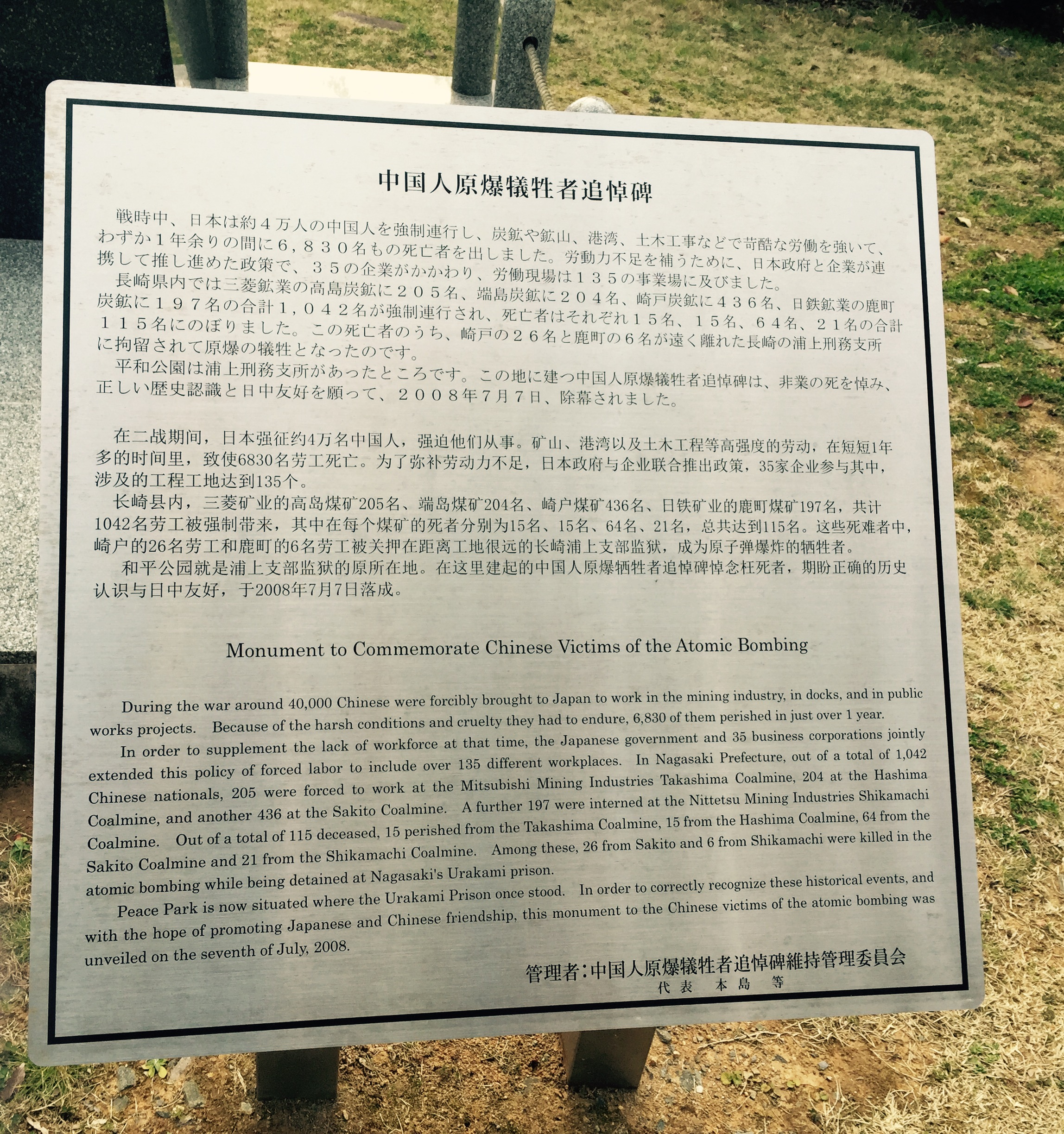
Monument to Commemorate Chinese victims of the Atomic bombing

The Monument to Commemorate Chinese Victims of the Atomic Bombing (中国人原爆犠牲者追悼碑, Chūgokujin genbaku giseisha tsuitōhi) is in Nagasaki Peace Park in Nagasaki, Japan. During WWII, at least 40,000 Chinese laborers were forcibly brought to Japan from China to make up for a nationwide labor shortage. There were about 1,000 Chinese laborers forced to work in mines in Nagasaki. During the atomic bomb on Nagasaki, 32 of those Chinese laborers died.

The Nagasaki memorial commemorates those 32 Chinese, brought to Japan as forced labourers and made to work as coal-miners, who were in Urakami Prison and died in the atomic bombing of the city on August 9, 1945, during World War II. The monument was unveiled on July 7, 2013. According to the Japan Times, there were 33 Chinese prisoners in jail for various charges, which included spying. There was one survivor from among the prisoners, who later died under interrogation.
