= Reine Antier =

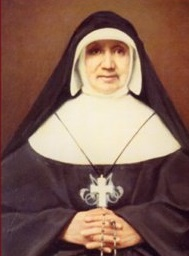
- Born: 19 November 1801; Laussonne, Haute-Loire, France
- Died: 28 October 1883 (aged 81); Chauffailles, Saône-et-Loire, France
- Other name: Sœur Augustine
- Occupation: Nun
- Known for: Founder of the Congrégation des Soeurs de l'Enfant-Jésus de Chauffailles

Reine Antier (19 November 1801 – 28 October 1883) was a French Roman Catholic nun. She is known as the founder of the Congrégation des Soeurs de l'Enfant-Jésus de Chauffailles, an order of teaching nuns.

== Early years ==
Reine Antier was born on 19 November 1801, and was baptised in Laussonne, Haute-Loire. Her parents were Jean-Mathieu Antier and Marie-Anne Mazoyer. Her uncle was the Abbé Joseph-François Hanthié (or Antier). She was the fifth child of the family, and was born a few weeks after her father had died. Her family was prosperous and deeply Christian. Her sister Jeanne-Marie Antier would become the superior general of the Le Puy school of Christian instruction, and was a close friend of Mother Marie Rivier (died 1854), founder of the Congrégation de la Présentation de Bourg Saint-Andéol. Another sister, Agathe, became an Ursuline nun. The family moved to Varennes to live with an uncle, a refractory priest. Reine Antier attended the school of the Dames de l'Instruction au Puy, where her sister was a nun. She entered the abbey of the Ursulines of Saint-Chamond, where her other sister was a nun. However, she decided the order did not suit her.

== Société de l'Instruction du Puy ==
Reine Antier returned to the Société de l'Instruction du Saint-Enfant-Jésus du Puy. This congregation had been founded in Le Puy-en-Velay in 1667 by Anne-Marie Martel and two priests from Saint-Sulpice. The nuns were engaged in the education and religious instruction of young women. On 3 January 1823 Reine Antier devoted herself to the service of God in the Société de l’Instruction du Saint-Enfant-Jésus du Puy. She took the name of Sister Augustine. As a novice in the Society she was given charge of a local girls' school, where her ability became clear. She was then assigned to teach in the parish of Saint-Didier-la-Séauve on the border of the diocese, where she spent 20 years. She then taught at Tence, Lempdes and Yssingeaux.

== Move to Chauffailles ==
Locations in France

On 31 October 1846 Sister Augustine moved to Chauffailles, Saône-et-Loire, with five other nuns from the Société de l'Instruction. She had been sent by her superior to take charge of the girls' school there under the Diocese of Autun. They replaced the nuns of Saint-Joseph de Cluny, who had retired from the school the year before. In the first years she and the other nuns opened a nursery for children who would be alone while their parents worked in the fields or wove cloth. They tried to train the girls as Christians and good mothers. Mother Augustine soon saw the need to evangelise the whole family, and created gatherings for girls, women and men. The Abbé Lainent, the parish priest, obtained permission for her to run the local hospice and to establish a novitiate at Chauffailles. On 27 August 1848 the first patient was admitted to the hospice. Young women from the region joined the group. They opened schools for girls from isolated hamlets and villages in Burgundy.

== Separate congregation ==
In 1857 the Bishop of Autun began the process of detaching the Chauffailles community from the Le Puy community. On 14 September 1859 Bishop Bouange published a decree that established the congregation of Sœurs de l’Enfant-Jésus de Chauffailles, which then had 78 professed nuns and 14 novices, with Mother Augustine as Superior General. By 1860 the Maison de Chauffailles had expanded to 70 establishments in five dioceses, with many novices. In 1877, at the request of Mgr Bernard Petitjean, Mother Augustine sent the first contingent of nuns to Japan. In 1881 some young Japanese women joined the sisters.

Reine Antier died in Chauffailles on 28 October 1883. She had opened 127 establishments. The congregation had 356 professed sisters, 16 novices, 7 postulants and 111 establishments.

== Sources ==
- Biographie de Reine Antier (in French), Congrégation des Soeurs de L'Enfant-Jésus de Chauffailles (Province du Canada)
- Cubizolles, Pierre (2005), Le diocèse du Puy-en-Velay des origines à nos jours (in French), EDITIONS CREER, ISBN 978-2-84819-030-3
- Grobot, Serge, Reine Antier 1801 - 1883 (in French), Paroisse de la Nativité du Seigneur
- Perrossier, Cyprien (1893), "L'Abbé J.-B. Caillet", Bulletin d'histoire ecclésiastique et d'archeologie religieuse des diocèses de Valance, Gap, Grenoble & Viviers (in French)
- Sirois, Georgette (25 March 2010), "Reine Antier (1801-1883) – Femme de foi et d'audace", Femmes et Ministères (in French)
