= Chauffailles =

- Commune
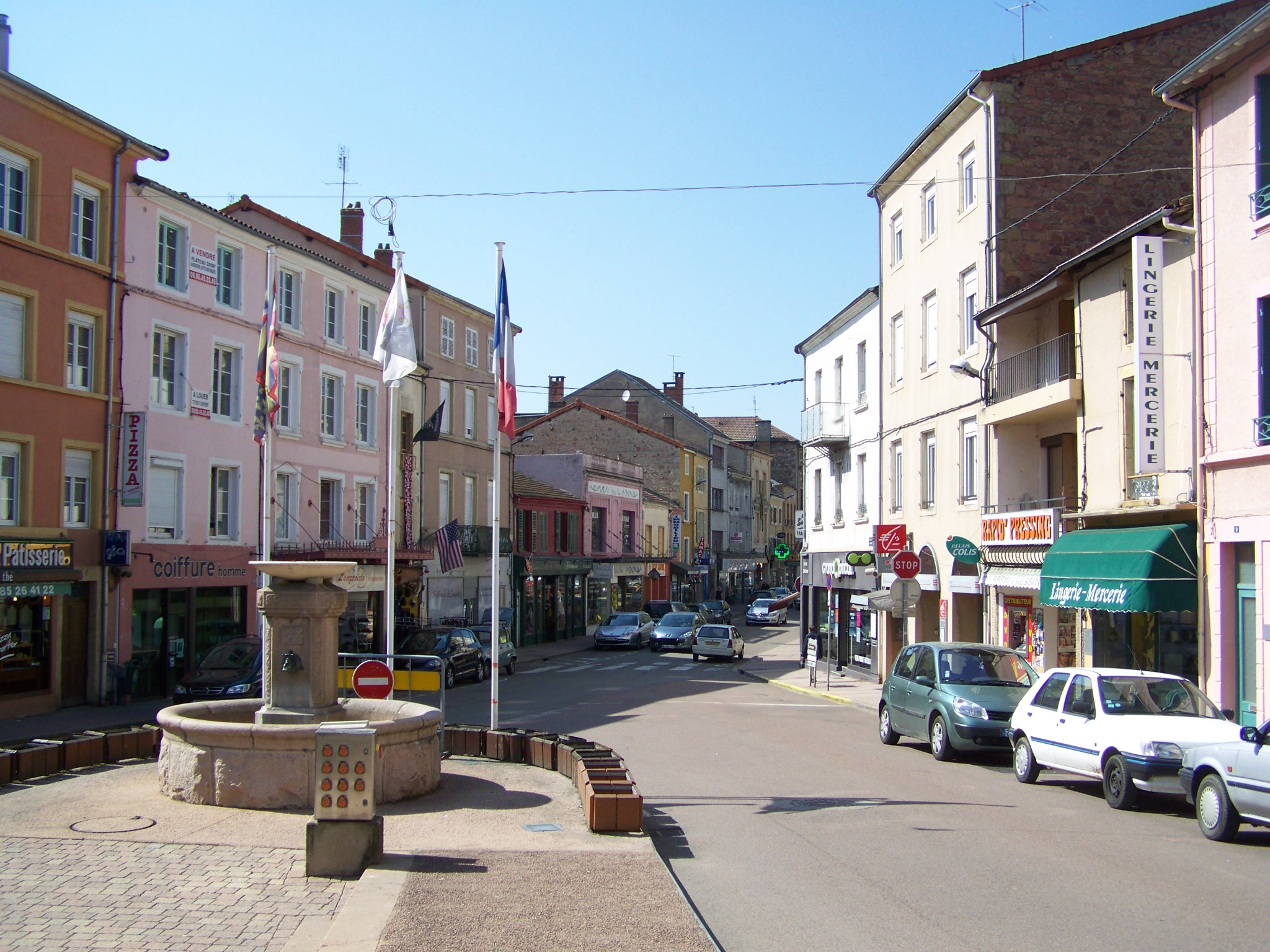
- Town centre

- Coat of arms
- Location of Chauffailles
- Location within France Location within Bourgogne-Franche-Comté
- Coordinates: 46°12′26″N 4°20′27″E
- Country: France
- Region: Bourgogne-Franche-Comté
- Department: Saône-et-Loire
- Arrondissement: Charolles
- Canton: Chauffailles
- Intercommunality: CC Brionnais Sud Bourgogne

Government
  - Mayor (2020–2026): Stéphanie Dumoulin
- Area^{1}: 22.63 km^{2} (8.74 sq mi)
- Elevation: 440 m (1,440 ft)
- Highest elevation: 653 m (2,142 ft)
- Lowest elevation: 352 m (1,155 ft)
- Population (2023): 3,638
  - Density: 160.8/km^{2} (416.4/sq mi)
- Time zone: UTC+01:00 (CET)
  - Summer (DST): UTC+02:00 (CEST)
- INSEE/Postal code: 71120 /71170
- ^{1} French Land Register data, which excludes lakes, ponds, glaciers > 1 km^{2} (0.386 sq mi or 247 acres) and river estuaries.

Chauffailles (French pronunciation: [ʃofaj]) is a commune in the Saône-et-Loire department in the region of Bourgogne-Franche-Comté in eastern France.

== Geography ==
Chaufailles lies in the extreme south of the department of Saône-et-Loire at the foot of the Beaujolais mountains.

== Population ==
Historical population
Year	Pop.	±% p.a.
1968	4,479	—
1975	4,955	+1.45%
1982	4,831	−0.36%
1990	4,485	−0.92%
1999	4,119	−0.94%
2007	3,980	−0.43%
2012	3,818	−0.83%
2017	3,708	−0.58%
2023	3,638	−0.32%
Source: INSEE

== Culture ==
Chauffailles was the base of the Congrégation des Soeurs de l'Enfant-Jésus de Chauffailles, an order of teaching nuns founded by Reine Antier (1801–83).

== See also ==
- Communes of the Saône-et-Loire department
