= Nagasaki Atomic Bomb Museum =

Museum in Nagasaki, Japan

Coordinates: 32°46′22″N 129°51′54″E

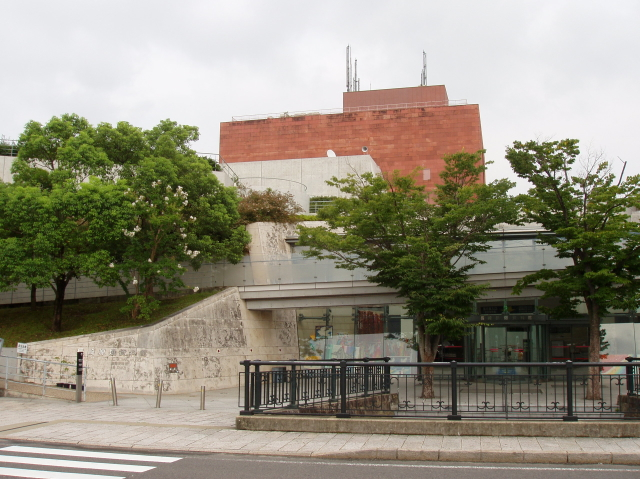
- Established: 1955, built current museum 1996
- Location: 7-8 Hirano-machi, Nagasaki, Nagasaki
- Website: nagasakipeace.jp

The Nagasaki Atomic Bomb Museum (長崎原爆資料館, Nagasaki Genbaku Shiryōkan) is in the city of Nagasaki, Japan. The museum is a remembrance to the atomic bombing of Nagasaki by the United States on 9 August 1945 at 11:02:35 am. Next to the museum is the Nagasaki National Peace Memorial Hall for the Atomic Bomb Victims, built in 2003. The bombing marked a new era in war, making Nagasaki a symbolic location for a memorial. The counterpart in Hiroshima is the Hiroshima Peace Memorial Museum. These locations symbolize the nuclear age, remind visitors of the vast destruction and indiscriminate death caused by nuclear weapons, and signify a commitment to peace.

The Nagasaki museum was completed in April 1996, replacing the deteriorating International Culture Hall. The museum covers the history of the event as a story, focusing on the attack and the history leading up to it. It also covers the history of nuclear weapons development. The museum displays photographs, relics, and documents related to the bombing.

== History of the museum ==
The museum at the Nagasaki Peace Park replaced the Nagasaki International Culture Hall, where artifacts related to the bombing of Nagasaki were originally exhibited. These artifacts are now supplemented with photographs depicting daily life in Nagasaki before the atomic bomb was dropped, the devastation produced by the bomb, and the history of nuclear arms development.

== History covered in the museum ==
Full-size model of the Fat Man atomic bomb on display in the museum

The Nagasaki Atomic Bomb Museum covers the history of the atomic bombing of Nagasaki. It portrays scenes of World War II, the dropping of the atomic bomb, the reconstruction of Nagasaki, and present day. Additionally, the museum exhibits the history of nuclear weapons development.

The atomic bomb was developed by scientists working under the Manhattan Project. The project was granted funding on December 6, 1941, with American leaders aiming for a new invention that would serve as a wartime weapon. The decision to drop an atomic bomb on Japan had been made by 1943, and a shortlist of candidate target cities was in place in 1945. At the time, it was argued that an atomic bombing would bring about a more rapid end to the war. Hiroshima, the first target, was selected to show the power of America's new weapon. The second bombing, of Nagasaki, was intended to demonstrate that America had a large arsenal. At 11:02 A.M. local time on August 9, 1945, the atomic bomb, nicknamed Fat Man as its code name by Robert Serber in the United States (after Sydney Greenstreet's character in The Maltese Falcon) was dropped on Nagasaki. A mushroom cloud rose to an altitude of 45,000 feet (14,000 m) above the city.

Within the museum is a history of the city before the bomb was dropped. The hypocenter of the explosion was the Urakami district, which was a traditionally rustic and isolated suburb. However, the population soared after the 1920s when the district was chosen as the site for munitions factories. An industrial zone was quickly created. Additionally, the Urakami district was home to the Nagasaki Medical College. When the bomb was dropped at 11:02 A.M. on August 9, 1945, the 20 neighborhoods within a one-kilometer radius of the hypocenter were destroyed by the heat flash and blast winds generated by the explosion. They were then reduced to ashes by the fires which followed. Within 2 km of the hypocenter, roughly 80% of the houses collapsed and burned. When the smoke cleared, the area was strewn with corpses.

Reconstruction of the city proceeded slowly. It was not until the latter half of 1946 that the first emergency dwellings were provided to the communities. The need for buildings far surpassed the availabilities. As late as 1950, applications for corporate dwellings exceeded the availability ninety times. The national government of Japan created a war disaster reconstruction plan in November 1945 which projected a city concept which would abandon the old war industries and focus instead on a revival of foreign trade, shipbuilding, and the fishing industry. Today, the city is considered a peace city and has pledged itself to the mission of world peace.

== Inside the museum ==
The residents of Nagasaki consider it their duty to make sure the horrors which they experienced due to the atomic bombing are never repeated. Because of this, the museum is designed in such a way that the audience can see just what effect the bomb had on the city, the reconstruction, and the lasting effects of the atomic bomb. The museum opens with a room dedicated to the city as it was just before the bomb decimated Nagasaki. A clock which stopped at 11:02, the precise time the bomb hit the city, is also on display to demonstrate how so many people were killed in an instant.

In the next section, visitors enter a room which shows Nagasaki just after the bombings. Included in this room is a water tank with contorted legs which was located at Keiho Middle School, approximately 800 m away from the hypocenter of the bombing. The section "Events leading up to the Nagasaki Atomic Bombing" isolates historical events from contemporary biases. The permanent exhibition rooms display large materials exposed to the blast, as well as a replica of a sidewall of the Urakami Cathedral which was hit by the bomb.

The purpose is to reproduce the state which the city was in immediately after the bombing. Photographs and facts are shown alongside artifacts left by the deceased. Additionally, the second section contains some of the rosaries found inside the Urakami Cathedral. At the time of the bombing, dozens of people were inside the cathedral for confession. This section also exhibits a timeline of events which shows a course of events that occurred prior to the bomb being dropped in Nagasaki. Leaflets which American forces dropped on Japan during the early part of 1945 are on display. One gives information on the bombing of Hiroshima and the power of the atomic bomb, warning citizens to leave the city and stop fighting. Also included are melted bottles, the bones of a human hand stuck to a clump of melted glass, burnt clothing, a lunchbox with its contents still charred inside of it, and a helmet with the remains of a victim's skull on the inner surface. Section B shows damage caused by the radiation, damages caused by the blast, appeals of the atomic bomb survivors, and the rescue and relief activities which were carried out.

After viewing the city scene, museum visitors are invited to think about issues related to war and nuclear non-proliferation. This section of the museum contains the political sections entitled "The Road to the Atomic Bombing" and "The War between China and Japan and the Pacific War". It is there that the experience of militarism in Japan and the demands of war are juxtaposed with arguments for the end of nuclear weapons. Visitors are presented with facts on modern nuclear weapons alongside facts related to victims of the atomic bombing. It is a call for peace and an end of the nuclear age.

The final room in the museum contains videos and documents related to the Nagasaki bombing. Visitors can also find answers to their questions and documents like Nagasaki's Peace Declaration.

== Maintenance of exhibits ==
The museum exhibits objects that were exposed to radiation from the atomic bomb. Though some materials are double-cased, display techniques generally are not tailored in any special way for the preservation of these materials.

== Criticism ==
When the museum initially opened in 1966 there was criticism of the re-interpretation of Japanese history. Furthermore, the museum was considered highly political, as it presented only one side of the story and did not promote the concept of peace.
