= Akira Kuryu =

Japanese architect (born 1947)

Akira Kuryu

Akira Kuryu (栗生 明, Kuryū Akira; born 1947) is a Japanese architect known for designing many museums in Japan. Compared with his contemporaries, Kuryu started his career later than other famous Japanese architects.

Kuryu graduated from Waseda University and once worked with Maki, another architect, at Maki & Associates and then became an associate lecturer in the Maki Research Department at the University of Tokyo. In 1987, he set up Akira Kuryu Architect & Associates. Since then, he has finished multiple projects, including a series of public facing museum buildings such as the “Uemura Naomi memorial museum”(1994) and the Nagasaki National Peace Memorial Hall for the Atomic Bomb Victims (2003). He has won many awards such as The Prize of Architectural Institute of Japan, Award of the Japan Art Academy, Kenneth F. Brown Asia Pacific Culture and Architecture Design Award. With his successful architectural designs, Akira Kuryu has gained a large reputation in the field of architecture in Japan.

== Biography ==
1973 Graduated — from Graduate School of Architectural Planning, Waseda University. Joined Maki & Architects.

1979 — Established K Atelier, urban architectural design office Assistant, Department of Architecture, University of Tokyo

1983 — Left University of Tokyo; became president of K Atelier Studied in Europe for a year as international trainee commissioned by Agency of Cultural Affairs

1987 — Changed the company name to Kuryu & Architects; appointed representative director

1992 — Chiba University

== Works ==
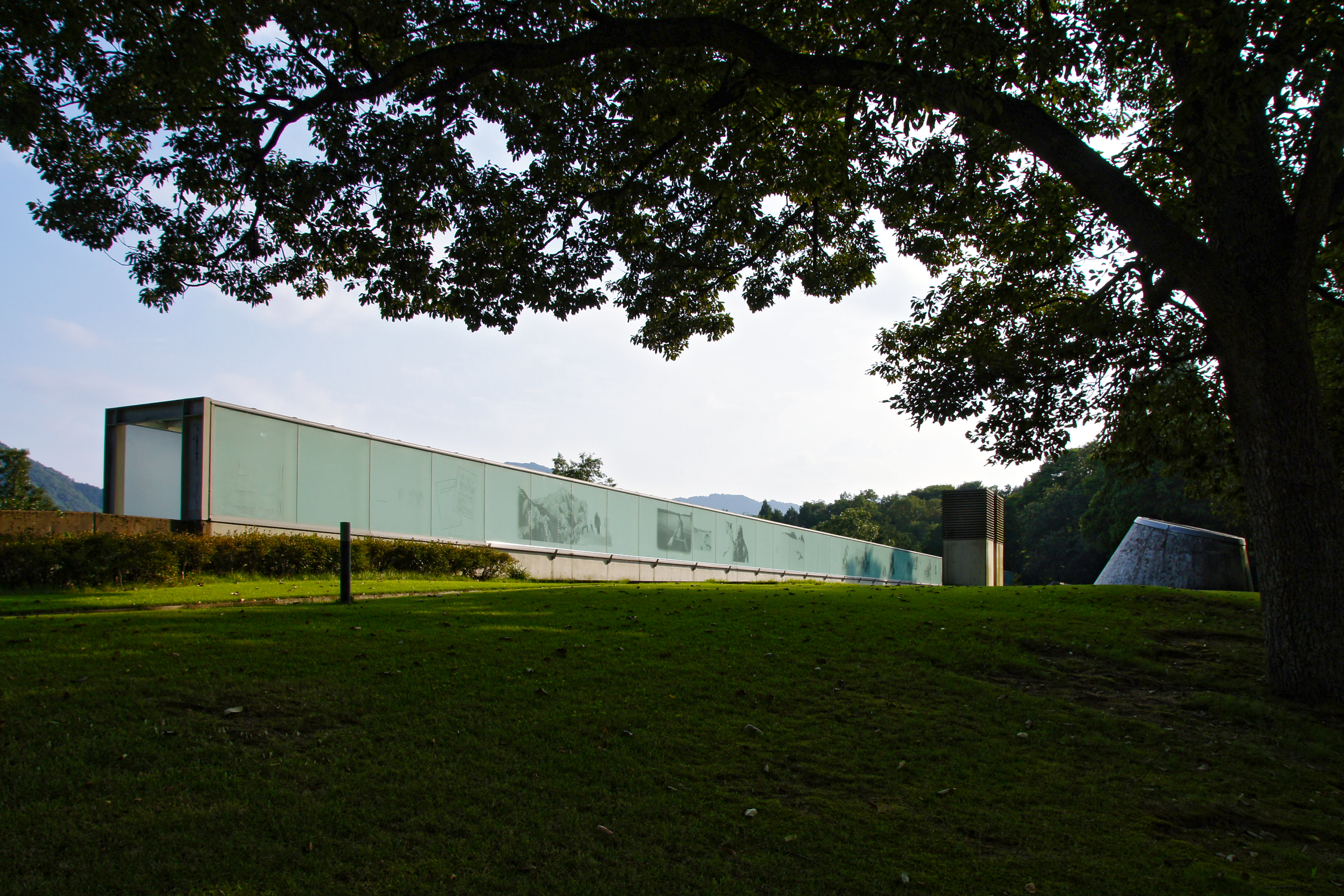
Uemura Naomi Memorial Museum

- Carnival Showcase 1988
- Uemura Naomi Memorial Museum 1994
- Patrie+Kiyosato Museum of Photographic Arts (K*MoPA) 1995
- Core Yamakuni (Amenity Town) 1996
- Okazaki Mindscape Museum 1996
- BYODOIN Museum HOSHOKAN: Temple Museum 2001
- Memorial Academium of Toin Gakuen 2001
- Nagasaki National Peace Memorial Hall for the Atomic Bomb Victims 2004
- Shizuoka International Garden and Horticulture Exhibition+Hamanako Garden Park 2004

== Sources ==
- http://www.kuryu.com
- http://www.nsknet.or.jp/westhill/designer/kuryu_profile1.htm
