= Urakami =

Area in the city of Nagasaki

Coordinates: 32°46′26″N 129°51′48″E

Urakami is an area in the northern part of the city of Nagasaki, Japan.

== History ==
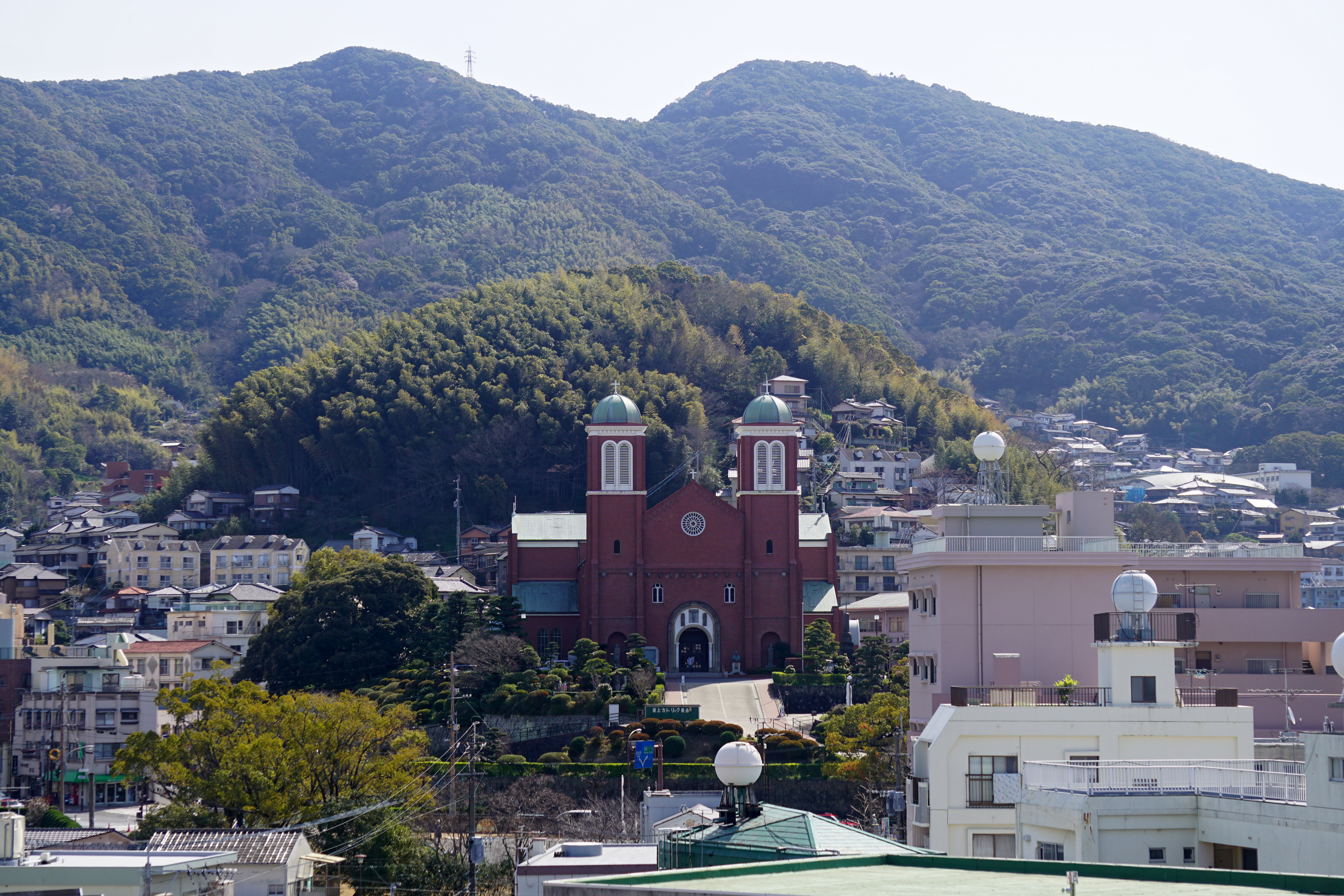
The Urakami area in 2020; the church in the middle of the image is the Catholic Urakami Cathedral

Following Arima Harunobu's victory at the Battle of Okitanawate in 1584, Urakami was ceded in gratitude to the Society of Jesus. It was later confiscated by Toyotomi Hideyoshi, along with Nagasaki.

In 1614, by the orders of shōgun leader Tokugawa Ieyasu, Christianity was banned in Japan in order to suppress European influence and to prevent the undermining of the Japanese government. Most Japanese Christians who openly spoke about their religion were open to prosecution and subject to extreme harsh treatment, such as torture or crucifixion. As a result, Urakami became the stronghold for oppressed believers who steadfastly adhered to their religion in secret.

During this time period, the Oura Cathedral played the important role as spiritual support for Christians in Urakami. The presence of Christians within the Urakami area caused the Japanese government to launch a crackdown in order to implement the ban. On September 1, 1790, the first persecution began in Urakami; hidden Christians were discovered and arrested, though there were no deaths. In 1839, a new wave of persecution was launched in Urakami, though this too did not result in any deaths. In the third kuzure (literally, "disintegration"), conducted in 1859, more than 10 people died under torture. The fourth and final persecution was conducted between 1867 and 1873, better known as the Urakami Yoban Kuzure.

During the process, 68 residents of Urakami were arrested and were forced to renounce their religion entirely. This led to protests from foreign consuls, and the Tokugawa Shogunate relented. However, soon after Tokugawa Shogunate ended and in February 1868 the new Meiji government appointed Sawa Nobuyoshi in charge of public order in Kyūshū. His dislike of all things foreign was well known, and, after consultation, he decided to deal with the problem once and for all. His plan to exile the entire village was approved by an Imperial council on April 25 and implemented in two stages: first the ringleaders to Hagi, Tsuwano and Fukuyama, and then the rest of the village. Families were split up, and in total 3,414 Christian men, women, and children were sent into exile to all over Japan: 500 to Kanazawa, 160 to Tsuwano, 150 to Satsuma, 117 to Tsuru Shima, Okayama, etc.

However, under pressure, and wanting to keep the relationship with the United States and European countries, especially after the Japanese government opened to the world in the 1850s, the ban was lifted in 1873 and the Japanese Christians were finally able to return to Urakami. In 1895, Christians built the first cathedral in Japan in the Urakami area. The construction of the cathedral was fully completed in 1925.

On August 9, 1945, near the end of World War II, Urakami became the site for ground zero when the atomic bomb exploded at about a height of 500 metres (1,600 ft). The damage caused by the heat rays and the blast was almost entirely restricted to this area, while the Nakashima area was fairly well shielded by the hills. However, 36% of the total structures in both areas were damaged. The Urakami Cathedral was also heavily damaged during the blast.

Following the war, Urakami was rebuilt and now houses the once-damaged Cathedral site. Railway access is provided by JR Kyushu, which operates Urakami Station along the Nagasaki Main Line.

== See also ==
- Nagasaki § Atomic bombing of Nagasaki during World War II
