= Bernard Petitjean =

Roman Catholic missionary to Japan

Bernard Thaddée Petitjean M.E.P.
- Vicar Apostolic of Southern Japan
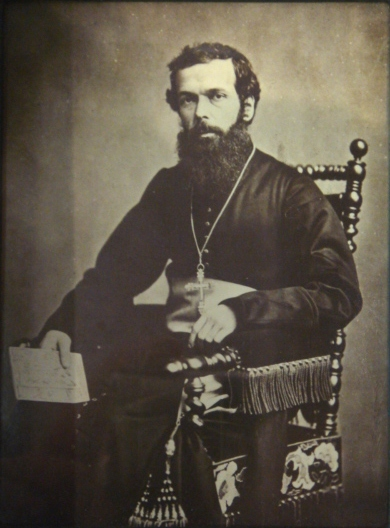
- Petitjean, c. 1866
- Church: Catholic Church
- See: Apostolic Vicariate of Southern Japan
- In office: 20 June 1876 – 7 October 1884
- Predecessor: Vicariate established
- Successor: Jules-Alphonse Cousin
- Other post: Titular Bishop of Myriophytos (1866-1884)
- Previous post: Vicar Apostolic of Japan (1866-1876)

Orders
- Ordination: 21 May 1853
- Consecration: 21 October 1866 by Philippe François Zéphirin Guillemin

Personal details
- Born: 14 June 1829 Blanzy-sur-Bourbince, Saône-et-Loire, Kingdom of France
- Died: 7 October 1884 (aged 55) Nagasaki, Nagasaki Prefecture, Empire of Japan

Bernard Thaddée Petitjean (French pronunciation: [bɛʁnaʁ pətiʒɑ̃]; 14 June 1829 – 7 October 1884) was a French Catholic prelate who served as Apostolic Vicar of Japan from 1866 to 1876.

== Life ==
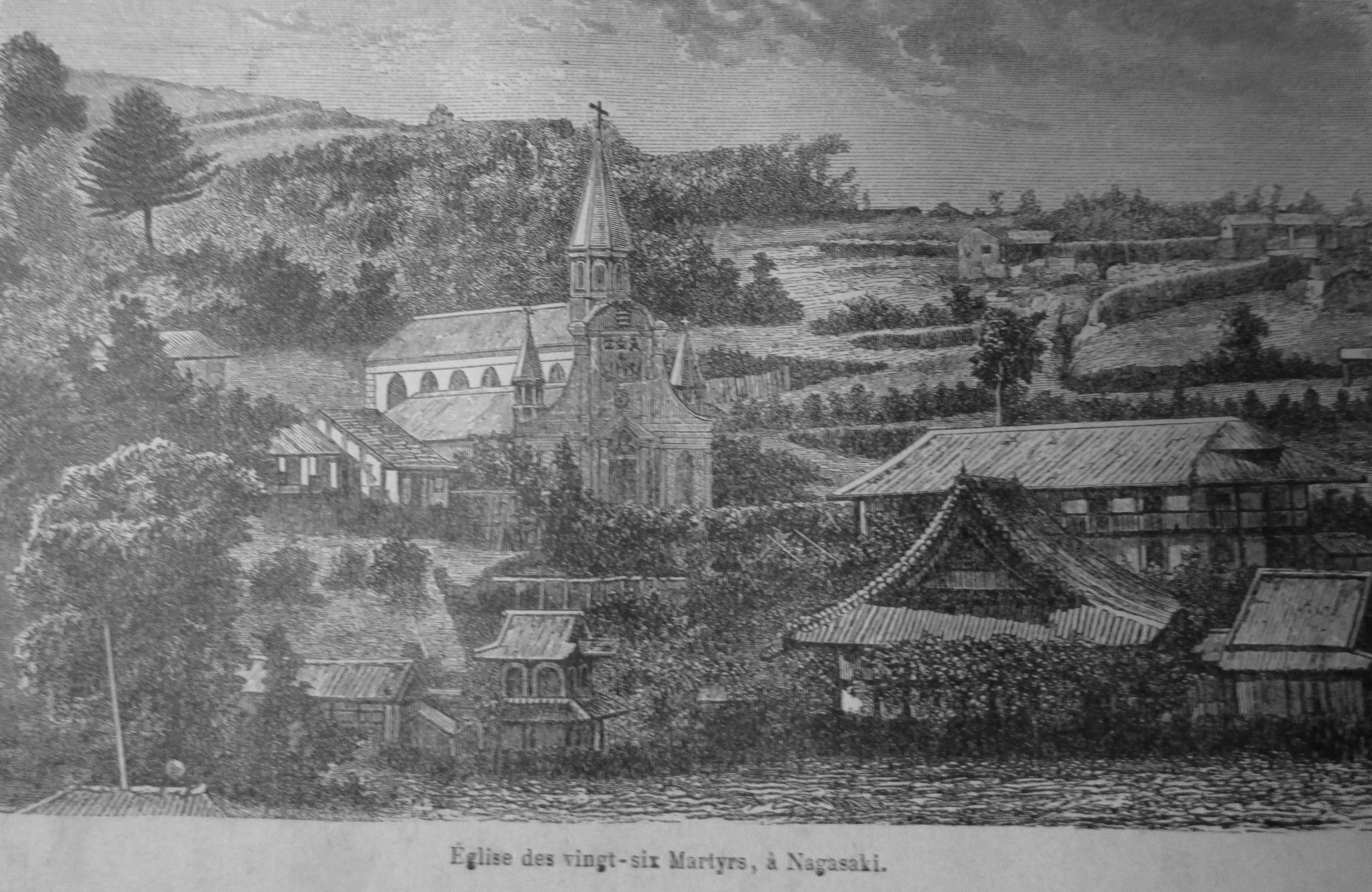
The first Church of the Twenty-Six Martyrs at Nagasaki in 1885.

He was born in Blanzy-sur-Bourbince and studied at the minor and major seminaries in Autun. He was ordained into the priesthood on 21 May 1853 and then became a professor at the minor seminary in Autun followed by a parish ministry between 1854 and 1856 at Verdun-sur-le-Doubs. He was made an apostolic missionary in 1856 and preached in several villages.

On 27 December 1858 he was made almoner to the nuns of order of the Sisters of the Infant Jesus at Chauffailles - this experience of apostolic ministry and of spiritual direction moved him to enter the Missions étrangères de Paris seminary aged thirty. Exactly nine months later he set out for Japan, to which he had been designated by his superiors.

He initially stayed for two years on the Ryūkyū Islands then in 1863 moved to Yokohama then Nagasaki with R. P. Furet. Japan had just been forced to re-admit foreigners after banning them for many years. He became a French teacher and took part in the construction of a church dedicated to the Twenty-Six Martyrs of Japan, overlooking the sea - it was designed by Girard and Furet and opened on 19 February 1865.

A few weeks after the church opened, it was where Petitjean met the descendants of the Kakure Kirishitan or "hidden Christians", who were drawn there by the construction of the church and its cross, like the crosses they had hidden in their homes. Mostly simple fishing people or artisans, they only discreetly introduced themselves to him, fearful of eventual reprisals. He decided to visit their villages. By 8 June 1865, Petitjean had already met twenty five hidden Christians, who had kept up certain prayers, a cross and meeting with an elder.

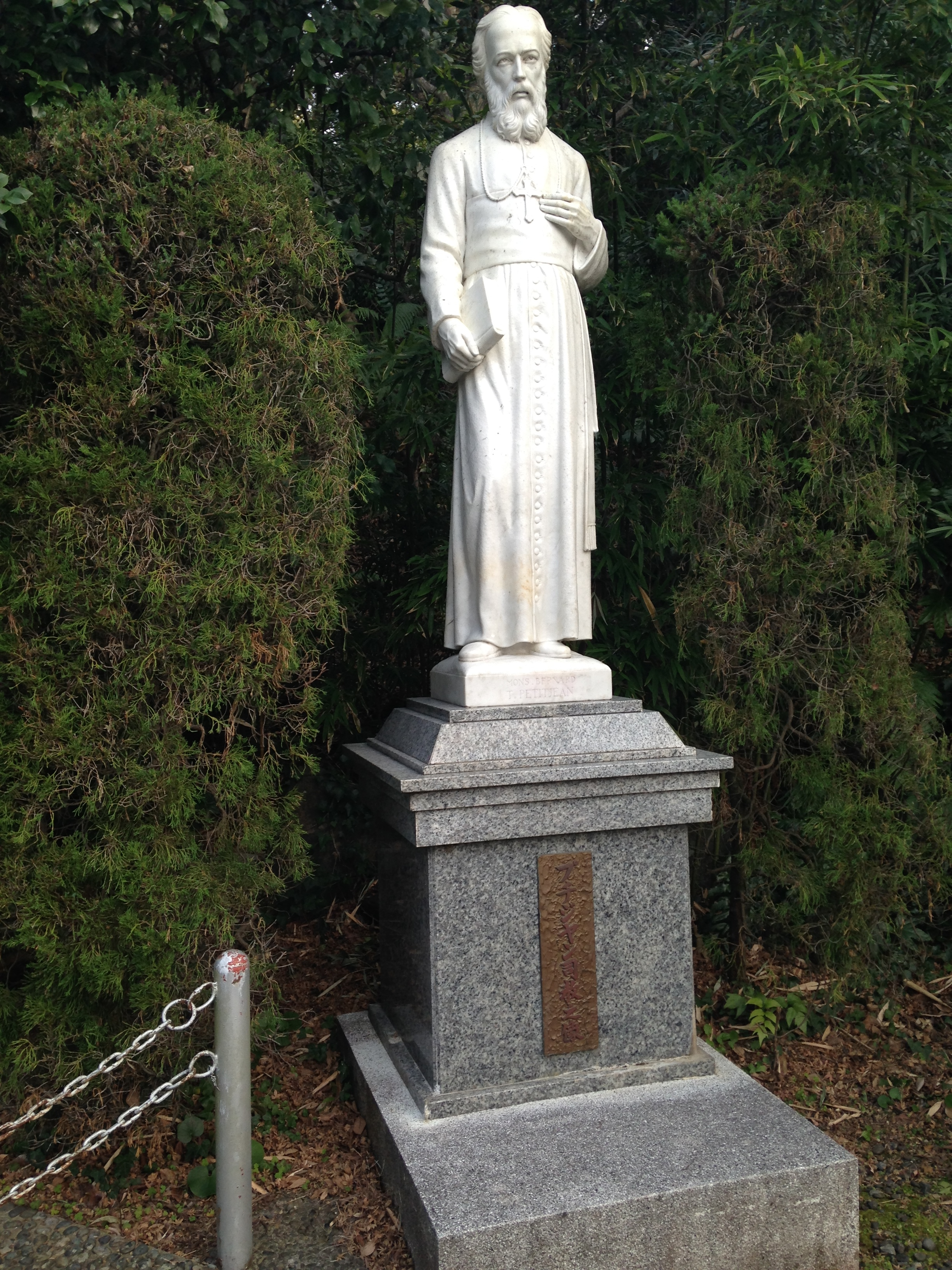
A sculpture of Petitjean in the garden of the Church of the Twenty-Six Martyrs.

Pope Pius IX made Petitjean bishop of Myriophite in partibus and vicar apostolic of Japan on 11 May 1866. He was consecrated a bishop by Guillemin in Hong Kong the following 21 October. The imperial Japanese government imprisoned and killed many Christians in a wave of reprisals and in April and June 1868 two edicts forbade Christianity. From October 1869 to January 1870, more than 3000 Christians were taken from Urakami and exiled to many locations around Japan.

At the same time many on the Goto Islands were jailed, or tortured. Petitjean was sent back to France in June 1868 and took part in the First Vatican Council in Rome. He wrote to the Japanese authorities and to the representatives of the French government, but to no avail, especially after the fall of Napoleon III's regime.

The imperial repression of Christianity only ended in 1873. That year, Petitjean was allowed back by the Japanese authorities, initially only on the condition that he only give the sacraments to foreign soldiers, sailors and merchants in Japan's ports. Pius IX sent Petitjean the apostolic letter Dum asperrimam in May 1873 to express his joy at the end of the persecution and the start of a limited degree of tolerance of Christianity by the authorities.

Peitjean and his auxiliary bishop Laucaigne (titular bishop of Apollonia from 22 February 1874) had to set up a Catholic hierarchy and structures in Japan from scratch. Missionaries were sent with different roles, including some on scholarly and scientific missions. Nuns also came over from the Sisters of the Infant Jesus nunneries at Saint-Maur and Chauffailles, sent by their founder, Mother Reine Antier. Towards the end of 1875, Petitjean went to Rome to ask that his vicariate be divided in two between north and south Japan, with him retaining northern Japan. Southern Japan was entrusted to Pierre-Marie Osouf - Petitjean was one of two bishops to consecrate him in 1877 in the chapel of the Missions étrangères on rue de Bac in Paris.

Initially based in Osaka, where he built a church, he later returned to Nagasaki. He died in Nagasaki on 7 October 1884 and was buried at the foot of the altar in Oura Church. At the time of his death Japan had 30,230 Christians, two bishops, 53 European missionaries (mainly French), three Japanese-born priests (all ordained by Petitjean on 31 December 1882, the first ever in the country), two seminaries with 79 students and 65 schools with 3,331 pupils.

== Coat of arms ==
- Gules, a statue of Our Lady, crowned, bearing the Infant Christ in her arms, standing on a cloud at the base of the shield
- Motto: Ipse conteret caput. - Sancta Maria, ora pro nobis.

== Sources ==
- (in French) Missions étrangères de Paris - Biography of Petitjean
