= Atomic bombings of Hiroshima and Nagasaki in popular culture =

Cultural works on the atomic bombings

This is a list of cultural products made about the atomic bombings of Hiroshima and Nagasaki. It includes literature, film, music and other art forms.

== Literature ==
- The book Hiroshima mon amour, by Marguerite Duras, and the related film, were partly inspired by the bombing. The film version, directed by Alain Resnais, has some documentary footage of burn victims and the aftereffects of devastation.
- The story of Sadako Sasaki, a young Hiroshima survivor diagnosed with leukemia, has been recounted in a number of books and films. Two of the best-known of these works are Karl Bruckner's The Day of the Bomb (1961), translated into 22 languages, and Eleanor Coerr's Sadako and the Thousand Paper Cranes (Putnam, 1977). Sasaki, confined to a hospital because of her leukemia, created 644 origami cranes, in reference to a Japanese legend which granted one wish to whoever could fold 1,000 cranes.
- Native American novelist Gerald Vizenor's "kabuki novel", Hiroshima Bugi (2003), compares the aftermath of the Hiroshima bombing to the aftermath of the conquest of the Americas.
- The Japanese author Fumiyo Kōno wrote her graphic novel about a story of a family after the atomic bomb, Town of Evening Calm, Country of Cherry Blossoms (2004), and translated into some languages.
- The French Madame Atomos series of novels by André Caroff (1964–70) features a female Japanese scientist seeking revenge upon the United States because she lost her family in the destruction of Nagasaki.
- The bombing of Nagasaki is a plot point in Min Jin Lee's novel Pachinko (2017).
- The Turkish poet Nâzım Hikmet wrote a poem named as Kız Çocuğu (The Girl Child), and this poem was translated to a lot of languages worldwide. It is also known in English with various titles, including I come and Stand at Every Door, I Unseen, and Hiroshima Girl.
- The bombing of Nagasaki plays a significant role in the novel Burnt Shadows by Kamila Shamsie.
- The children's book Shin's Tricycle tells the story of 3-year-old Shinichi Tetsutani, who was killed in the bombing of Hiroshima.
- The Last Train from Hiroshima

== Manga ==
- The Japanese manga Hadashi no Gen (Barefoot Gen) deals with the bombing in Hiroshima.

== Music ==
- The musical piece Threnody to the Victims of Hiroshima by Krzysztof Penderecki (sometimes also called Threnody to the Victims of Hiroshima for 52 Strings, and originally 8'37" as a nod to John Cage) was written in 1960 as a reaction to what the composer believed to be a senseless act. On 12 October 1964, Penderecki wrote: "Let the Threnody express my firm belief that the sacrifice of Hiroshima will never be forgotten and lost."
- Masao Ohki's 1953 Symphony No. 5, "Hiroshima", was one of the first of many Japanese works to be dedicated to the tragedy of the atomic bombing of Hiroshima, based on six paintings by Iri and Toshi Maruki, The Hiroshima Panels (tracks 3 to 8), to which Ohki added a Prelude and a final Elegy.
- Toshio Hosokawa's oratorio "Voiceless Voice in Hiroshima" for soloists, narrators, chorus, tape (ad lib.) and orchestra (1989/2001) after Matsuo Bashō, Paul Celan and Genbaku no Ko.
- Alfred Schnittke's early work, the oratorio Nagasaki, in five movements, on Soviet and Japanese lyrics.
- Composer Robert Steadman has written a musical work for voice and chamber ensemble entitled Hibakusha Songs. Commissioned by the Imperial War Museum North, Manchester, it was premiered in 2005.
- The Canadian rock band Rush's song "Manhattan Project", from their 1985 album Power Windows, is about the development of the atomic bomb and its use against Japan.
- The book Hiroshima mon amour served as inspiration for the like-titled 1977 song by the British new wave band Ultravox.
- The rock band Wishful Thinking had a hit in 1971 with "Hiroshima", a song about the bombing.
- The Japanese rock band L'Arc-en-Ciel recorded the song "Hoshizora" ("Starlit Sky") on the 2005 Awake album using Hiroshima as a metaphor of the devastation of war. The song was also dedicated to the victims of war in Afghanistan and Iraq.
- The song "Nuclear Attack" by Swedish power metal band Sabaton, from their album Attero Dominatus, is about the bombings and their effect on the Japanese people.
- The song "Enola Gay" by British pop band Orchestral Manoeuvres in the Dark is about the B-29 Superfortress bomber that delivered the payload of the first atomic bomb, Little Boy, over Hiroshima, and later flew weather reconnaissance for the second mission days later when Fat Man was dropped on Nagasaki. The song is anti-war, and questions the actions of the pilot.
- American composer Steve Heitzeg's "Green Hope After Black Rain (Symphony for the Survivors of Hiroshima, Nagasaki and the Manzanar Concentration Camp)" is a memorial to the victims of the 1945 atomic bombings of the two Japanese cities, and includes percussion elements made from Hiroshima and Nagasaki trees as well as stones from the Manzanar Japanese-American concentration camp.
- Canadian composer R. Murray Schafer’s 1970 work Threnody, written for youth choir, is dedicated to the victims of the bombings; The Canadian Encyclopedia called it "a moving and bitter commentary on the bombing of Nagasaki based on comments by survivors."

== Art ==
- Artists Stephen Moore and Ann Rosenthal examine 60 years of living in the shadow of the bomb in their decade-long art project "Infinity City." They document their travels to historical sites on three continents and explore their art installations and web works reflecting on America's nuclear legacy.
- The Hiroshima Panels (原爆の図, Genbaku no zu), a series of fifteen painted folding panels by the collaborative husband and wife artists Maruki Iri and Maruki Toshi completed over a span of thirty-two years (1950–1982), which depict the consequences of the atomic bombings of Hiroshima and Nagasaki, as well as other nuclear disasters of the 20th century.
- Hiroshima Nagasaki One-Minute (1978) paintings by Nabil Kanso

== Films about the events ==
- Hiroshima: Out of the Ashes
- Hiroshima (1953). The day of the bombing, told mostly from the viewpoint of a family of five who lived there
- Children of Hiroshima (1952). A kindergarten teacher goes back in 1949 after 4 years away to visit survivors from her old school.
- Fat Man and Little Boy
- Picadon
- If You Love This Planet (1982). A short documentary by Terre Nash complementing a lecture by Dr Helen Caldicott about the danger of nuclear weapons with Hiroshima footage.
- Imamura, Shohei (1989). Kuroi ame (Black Rain) (Feature-length drama). Japan: Toei Co. Ltd. The story of the aftermath of the Hiroshima bombing, based on Masuji Ibuse's novel.
- Kurihara, Koreyoshi and Roger Spottiswoode (1995). Hiroshima (Feature-length docudrama). Canada/Japan: Hallmark Home Entertainment. A detailed, semi-documentary dramatisation of the political decisions involved with the atomic bombings.
- Kurosawa, Akira (1991). Hachi-gatsu no kyôshikyoku (Rhapsody in August) (Feature-length drama). Japan: MGM Home Entertainment. Fictional drama that takes place in Nagasaki at the time of the bombing.
- Sato, Junya (2005). Hadashi no Gen (Barefoot Gen) (Feature-length, animated movie). Japan: Tara Releasing. Animated dramatization of the bombing of Hiroshima based on the writer's own experiences and the documented experiences of other survivors.
- Okazaki, Steven (2007). White Light/Black Rain: The Destruction of Hiroshima and Nagasaki (Documentary). Japan: Home Box Office (HBO), Siglo Ltd., Zazie Films Inc. Factual accounts of the events from Japanese survivors and American military.
- The Wolverine
- Oppenheimer
- Godzilla

== Television ==
- In the South Park episode "Whale Whores", in a satire of the whaling industry in Japan, the bombing of Hiroshima is referenced significantly as the primary motive for Japan to launch a crusade against every dolphin and whale in the world. A photo of the Enola Gay plane was doctored to replace the pilot and bombardier with a whale and a dolphin, therefore convincing the Japanese that these two animals are responsible for the devastating bombing. Stan, Kyle, Cartman and Kenny, however, create a new doctored version of the photo, replacing the dolphin and whale with a cow and a chicken, and they convince the Japanese that the latter two animals were the real culprits of the bombing. Thus, the Japanese redirect their crusade to all the chickens and cows in the world.

== Photography books ==
In The Photobook: A History, Vol. 1, Martin Parr and Gerry Badger wrote "These three books, along with Kikuji Kawada's 'symbolic reportage' in Chizu (The Map, 1965), constitute photography's most significant memorials to the defining event in twentieth-century Japanese history."

- Chizu (地図) = The Map (1965) by Kikuji Kawada.
- Hiroshima (ヒロシマ) (1958) by Ken Domon.
- Hiroshima-Nagasaki Document 1961 by Shōmei Tōmatsu and Ken Domon.
- "11 ji 02 fun" Nagasaki (＜11時02分＞Nagasaki, "11:02" Nagasaki) (1966) by Shōmei Tōmatsu.
