= The Peace Child of Hiroshima =

Sculpture in Salt Lake City, Utah, U.S.

Coordinates: 40.7616°N 111.8439°W

- Artist: Daryl Smith
- Year: 1991
- Medium: Bronze sculpture
- Dimensions: 120 cm × 61 cm × 30 cm (4 ft × 2 ft × 1 ft)
- Location: Salt Lake City, Utah, United States

The Peace Child of Hiroshima is a 1991 bronze sculpture by Darryl Smith, installed at the University of Utah in Salt Lake City, Utah, United States. The sculpture is in gratitude by a University of Utah alumnus, former internee, previously undergrad at the University of Washington, Seattle.

== Description and history ==
The sculpture measures approximately 4 by 2 by 1 foot (1.22 m × 0.61 m × 0.30 m) and rests on a stone base that is one-foot (0.30 m) tall and has a diameter of two feet (0.61 m). It depicts a young Japanese girl holding a folded paper crane. A plaque on the base reads: "Peace Child / Presented by Tadao Sunohara (1944 College of Business) in gratitude for the oasis of education he and other west coast Japanese Americans found here during WWII." The artwork was dedicated on August 15, 1991, and was surveyed by the Smithsonian Institution's "Save Outdoor Sculpture" program in 1993.

Smith said that he “sought to capture what sculptors call 'alightment'”, the sense that the figure is on the edge of a precipice, launching the orizuru, the origami crane. Smith said that he used a classroom photo, studied Eleanor Coerr's book Sadako and the Thousand Paper Cranes (1977), and drew on his learning of human anatomy “to create her embodiment.”

The patron of the sculpture in gratitude is by a University of Utah alumnus, former internee, previously undergrad at the University of Washington, Seattle. The bronze is an exact twin after the original installation by the artist in Peace Park, Seattle, dedicated 6 August 1990. About that time Sunohara contacted the artist about a commemorative sculpture and saw the original installation.

Together, these comprise a tripartite with a bronze crane by the artist, located in Mukilteo, Washington, commemorating early Japanese-Americans there and community or regional reconciliation after the Internment.

== See also ==
Photos of the Peace Child of Hiroshima—Flickr.
