= Peace Park (Seattle) =

Park in Seattle, Washington, United States

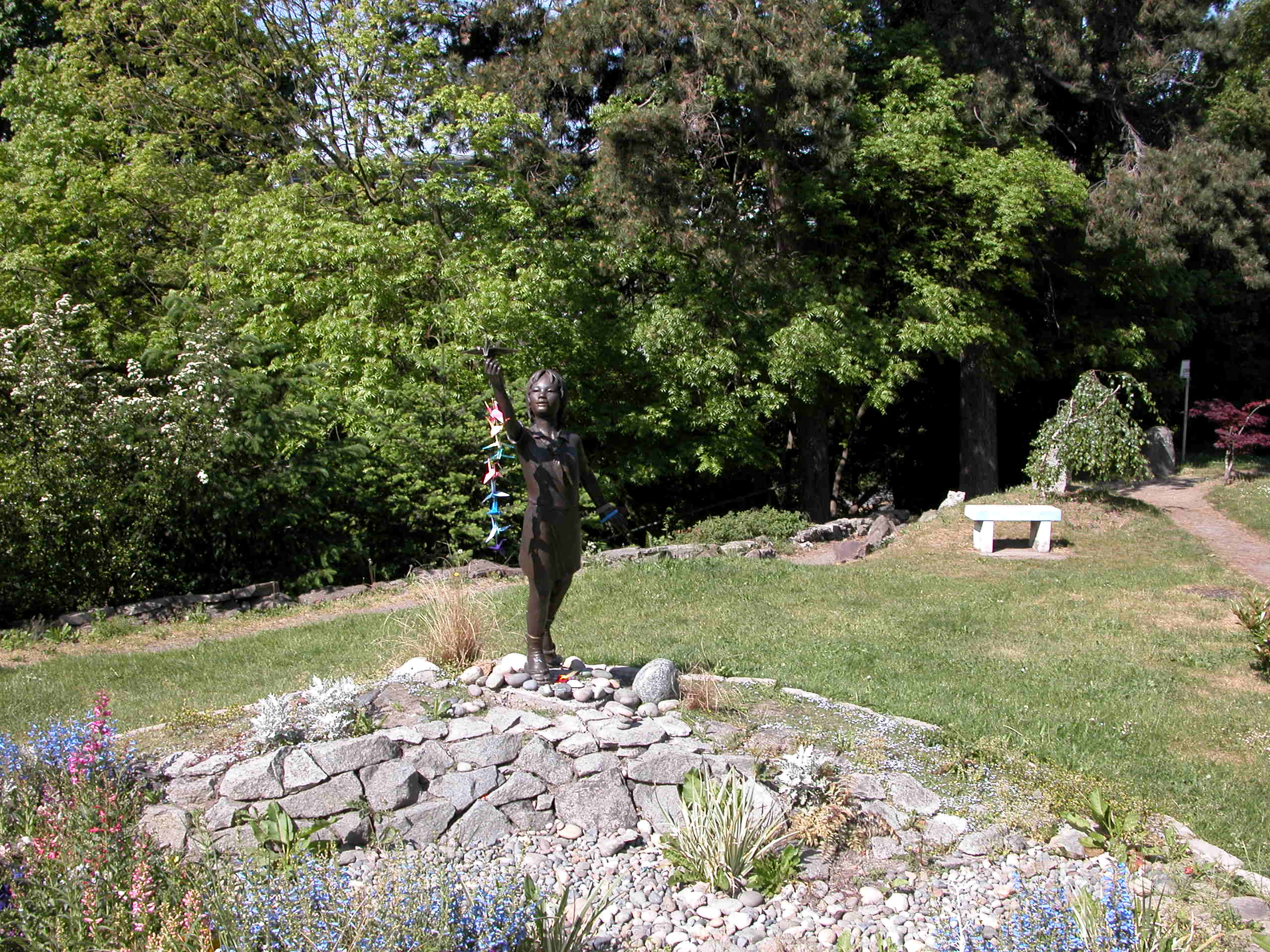
- Sadako Sasaki statue in Peace Park
- Interactive map of Peace Park
- Type: Urban Park
- Location: Seattle, Washington
- Coordinates: 47°39′21″N 122°19′10″W
- Established: 1990; 36 years ago
- Operator: Seattle Parks and Recreation

Peace Park is a park located in the University District of Seattle, Washington, near the corner of Northeast 40th Street and 9th Avenue Northeast, near the northern end of the University Bridge. Its construction was conceived and led by Floyd Schmoe, winner of the 1988 Hiroshima Peace Prize, and dedicated on August 6, 1990, 45 years after the atomic bombing of Hiroshima.

The park was home to a full-size bronze statue of Sadako Sasaki, sculpted by Darryl Smith, which was cut off above the ankles and stolen in July of 2024. Schoolchildren and other community members from around the city of Seattle frequently draped strings of peace cranes on the statue following the Japanese custom of the one thousand origami cranes.

== History ==
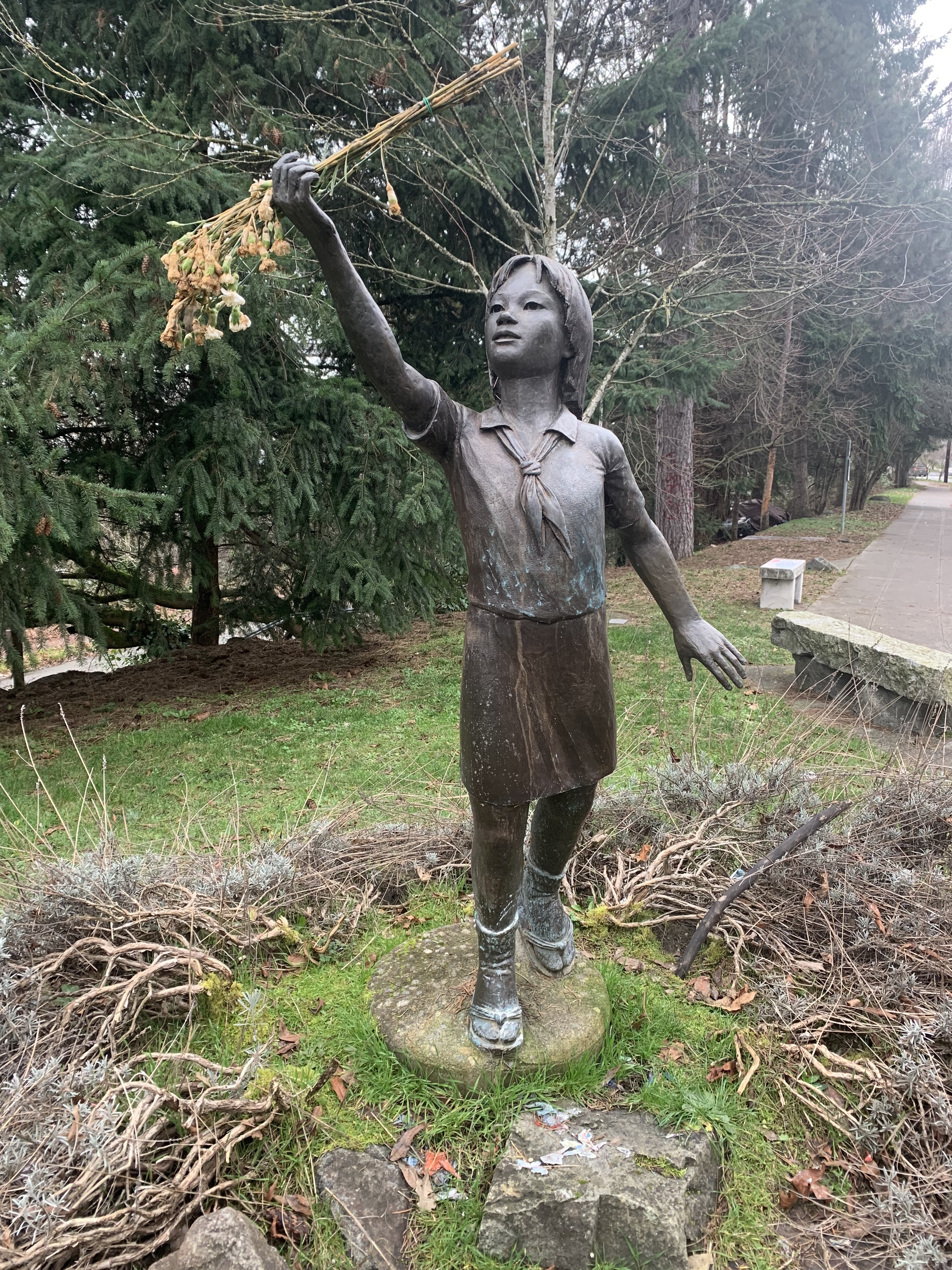
The statue of Sadako Sasaki at Peace Park

Seattle's Peace Park was dedicated on August 6, 1990, nearby the north end of University Bridge at 851 NE 40th Street. The hillside site, which had been an undeveloped area that was regularly crowded with illegal car parking and garbage, was cleaned up and landscaped by volunteers under the leadership of peace activist Floyd Schmoe, the winner of the 1988 Hiroshima Peace Prize. Schmoe had been a University of Washington student during the Incarceration and assisted fellow students affected by Executive Order 9066. He lobbied the city government to establish a peace park after receiving the 1988 Kiyoshi Tanimoto Peace Award from the Hiroshima Peace Center and used the $4,000 (1988 dollars) monetary award towards the project as well as being impetus for grants.

The centerpiece of the park is Sadako and the Thousand Paper Cranes, a life-size bronze of Sadako Sasaki created by sculptor Darryl Smith, labor largely donated. An exact twin is The Peace Child of Hiroshima, a 1991 casting by the artist, installed at the University of Utah in Salt Lake City, Utah. Together, these comprise a tripartite with a bronze crane by the artist, located in Mukilteo, Washington, commemorating early Japanese-Americans there and community or regional reconciliation after the Internment.

Smith said that he “sought to capture what sculptors call 'alightment'”, the sense that the figure is on the edge of a precipice, launching the orizuru. Smith said that he used a classroom photo, studied Eleanor Coerr's book Sadako and the Thousand Paper Cranes (1977), and drew on his learning of human anatomy “to create her embodiment.”

Sasaki was a survivor of the atomic bombing of Hiroshima at the age of two but died of leukemia a decade later. During her hospitalization, she aimed to fold one thousand origami cranes, which continue to be placed on her statues in Seattle and Hiroshima. As of 2023, the statue is the only outdoor monument in Seattle's municipal art collection that honors a female historical figure.

The efforts to adorn the space around the statue with peace cranes spontaneously come from Sadako's own attempt to fold 1000 cranes. Although she died after making 644 cranes, her story inspired those around her to continue the endeavor she began. The origami crane, translated from orizuru in Japanese, carries major cultural significance. It is believed that making 1000 cranes fulfills a person's goals and dreams, and was later deemed a peace effort in honor of Sadako.

=== Vandalism and upgrades ===
In December 2003, the statue was vandalized leaving damage to the ankle and a cut off right arm of the statue.Being long since the originals were cast and no longer having the mold, Smith made an impression from the identical Sadako at the University of Utah for an exact restoration. After the statue was vandalized, a number of people, including Sadako's family, requested the statue be relocated to the more heavily trafficked Green Lake Park. Ultimately the Seattle Parks Department decided the statue should remain in the Peace Park, where it was re-installed in mid-January 2005. The statue was later restored after the community donated towards its repair and held a celebration continuing to honor Sasaki's legacy.

In 2008, Peace Park was renovated by Seattle Parks and Recreation. This included new additions such as sidewalks, a stairway, and pathways that connected other public parks and trails, such as the Cheshiahud Lake Union Loop two streets south. The statue was vandalized again in September 2012 but was later repaired.

On July 12, 2024, the statue was reported stolen by the Seattle Police Department. The majority of the statue was removed, except for the feet below mid shank. A local historian figured that the 2024 incident was not politically-motivated vandalism, but theft for monetary reasons.
