= Leila Buckley =

British writer (1917–2013)

Leila Charlotte Evelyn Petronella Buckley (16 January 1917 – 25 January 2013), née Porter, known by her pen name Frances Lobb, was an English poet, novelist and translator. She was the daughter of Lt.-Col. Adrian Sydney Morton Porter OStJ, a King's Messenger, and the author Rose Henniker Heaton. Her grandfather was the postal reformer Sir John Henniker Heaton, 1st Baronet.

She married, firstly, the renowned Oxford classicist Courtenay Edward Stevens in 1938. She and Courtenay Stevens were divorced. She married, secondly, Philip Strachan Buckley in 1949.

During the Second World War she worked in the Political Intelligence Department of the Foreign Office.

== Works ==
=== Novels ===
- The Vow, Book Guild, 1999
- The Strangers, Art & Educational Publishers, 1947
- Handsome Johnnie, Faber and Faber, 1941

=== Translations ===
Leila Buckley translated works between English, German, Italian, French, Latin and ancient Greek. She is perhaps most famous as the English translator of Dino Buzzati's The Bears' Famous Invasion of Sicily.

She translated Mussolini's Memoirs 1942-1943, (George Weidenfeld & Nicolson, 1949) into English.

Other works include:

- The Day of the Bomb, Karl Bruckner, 1962
- Momo (novel), Michael Ende, 1973, as The Grey Gentlemen, Puffin Books, 1974
- The Golden Pharaoh, Karl Bruckner, Burke, 1959
- The Twenty Four Love Sonnets, Louise Labé, Euphorion, 1950 (trans. from 16th century Middle French and Italian)
- The Prince of Mexico, Federica de Cesco, Burke, 1968
- Saturn and Melancholy: Studies in the history of national philosophy, religion and art, Raymond Klibansky, Erwin Panofsky & Fritz Saxl, Thomas Nelson & Sons, 1964.
