= The Day of the Bomb =

1961 non-fiction book written by Karl Bruckner

- 1961 edition
- Author: Karl Bruckner
- Original title: Sadako will leben
- Translator: Frances Lobb
- Language: translated into English from German,
- Genre: Non-fiction book
- Publisher: Jungbrunnen
- Publication date: 1961
- Publication place: Austria
- English publication date: 1962
- Media type: print

The Day of the Bomb (in German Sadako will leben, meaning Sadako Wants to Live) is a novel written by the Austrian author Karl Bruckner in 1961.

The story is about a Japanese girl named Sadako Sasaki who lived in Hiroshima and died of illnesses caused by radiation exposure following the atomic bombing of the city in August 1945.

The book was translated into most major languages, published on the World Wide Web, and is often used as material for peace education in schools around the world.

== See also ==
- Children's Peace Monument
- Sadako and the Thousand Paper Cranes - 1977
