= Sadako Sasaki =

Japanese hibakusha (1943–1955)

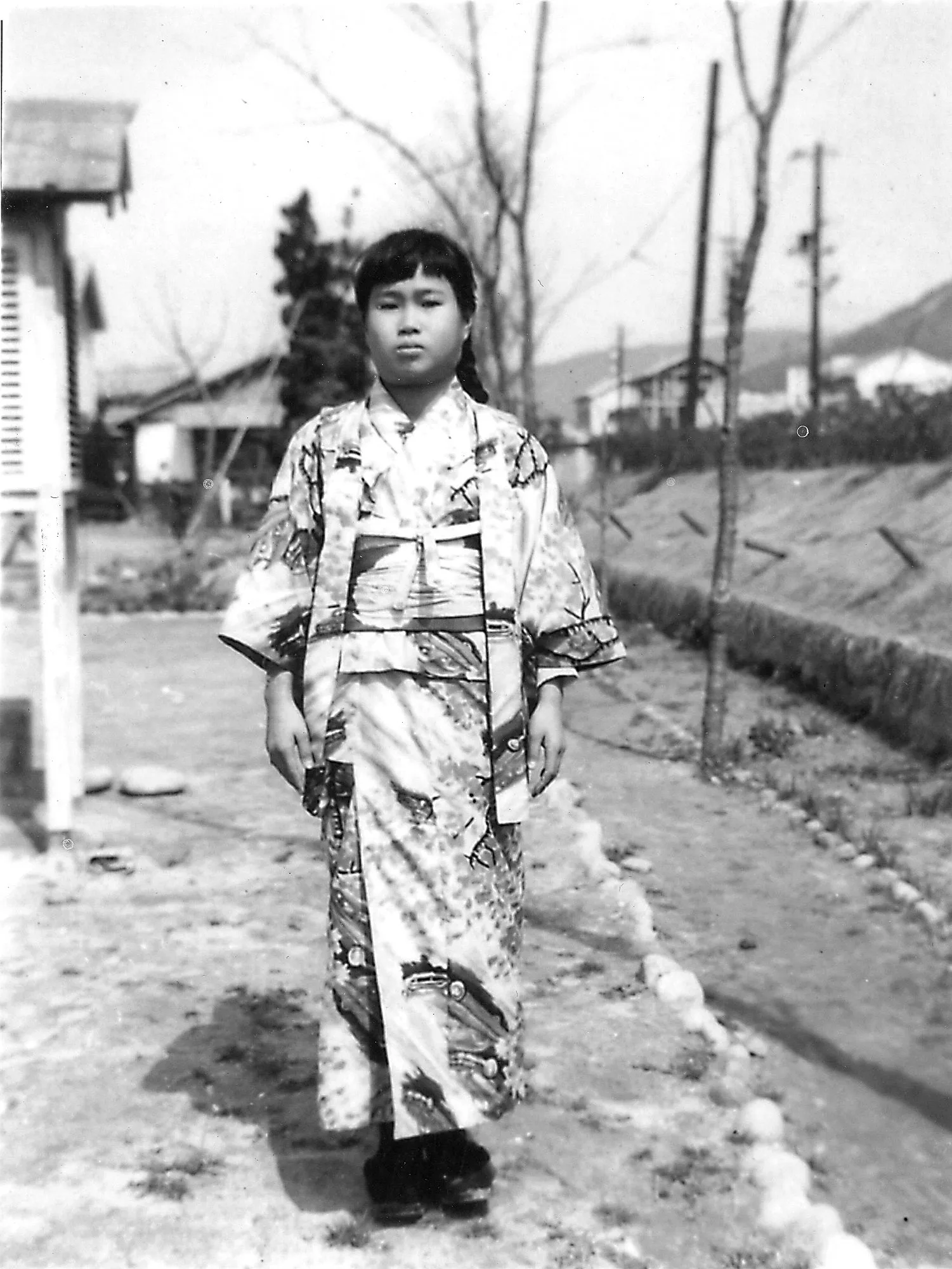
- Sasaki in 1955
- Born: January 7, 1943; Kusunoki, Yamaguchi, Japan (now part of Ube, Yamaguchi)
- Died: October 25, 1955 (aged 12); Red Cross Hospital, Hiroshima, Japan
- Cause of death: Leukemia
- Resting place: Fukuoka Prefecture, Japan
- Occupation: Student

Sadako Sasaki (佐々木 禎子, Sasaki Sadako; January 7, 1943 – October 25, 1955) was a Japanese girl who became a victim of the atomic bombing of Hiroshima by the United States. She was two years of age when the bombs were dropped and was severely irradiated. She survived for another ten years, becoming one of the most widely known hibakusha—a Japanese term meaning "bomb-affected person". She is remembered through the story of the more than one thousand origami cranes she folded before her death. She died at the age of 12 on October 25, 1955, at the Hiroshima Red Cross Hospital.

== Event ==
Sasaki was at home, about 1.6 kilometres (1 mi) away from ground zero, when the United States dropped an atomic bomb on Hiroshima. She was blown out of the window and her mother ran out to find her, suspecting she might be dead, but instead finding her two-year-old daughter alive with no apparent injuries. While they were fleeing, Sadako and her mother were caught in black rain. Her grandmother ran back inside and died near the house, apparently trying to escape fires by hiding in a cistern.

=== Aftermath ===
Sasaki grew up like her peers and became an important member of her class relay team. In November 1954, Sasaki developed swellings on her neck and behind her ears. In January 1955, purpura had formed on her legs. Subsequently, she was diagnosed with acute malignant lymph gland leukemia (her mother and others in Hiroshima referred to it as "atomic bomb disease"). She was hospitalized on February 21, 1955, and given no more than a year to live.

Several years after the atomic explosion, an increase in leukemia was observed, especially among young children. By the early 1950s, it was clear that the leukemia was caused by radiation exposure from the bomb.

She was admitted as a patient to the Hiroshima Red Cross Hospital for treatment and given blood transfusions on February 21, 1955. By the time she was admitted, her white blood cell count was six times higher than the average child's levels.

== Origami cranes ==
In August 1955, she was moved into a room with a girl named Kiyo, a junior high school student who was two years older than her. Shortly after, cranes were brought to her room from a local high school club. Sasaki's father told her the legend of the cranes and she set herself a goal of folding 1,000 of them, which was believed to grant the folder a wish. Although she had plenty of free time during her days in the hospital, Sasaki lacked paper, so she used medicine wrappings and whatever else she could scrounge; including going to other patients' rooms to ask for the paper from their get-well presents. Her friend Chizuko also brought paper from school for Sasaki to use.

A popular version of the story is that Sasaki fell short of her goal of folding 1,000 cranes, having folded only 644 before her death and that her friends completed the 1,000 and buried them all with her. (This comes from the novelized version of her life Sadako and the Thousand Paper Cranes.) However, an exhibit that appeared in the Hiroshima Peace Memorial Museum stated that by the end of August 1955, Sasaki had achieved her goal and continued to fold 300 more cranes. Sasaki's older brother, Masahiro Sasaki, says in his book The Complete Story of Sadako Sasaki that she exceeded her goal.

== Death ==
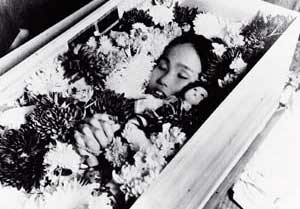
Sadako Sasaki in her casket, her body almost completely covered by flowers.

During her time in the hospital, her condition progressively worsened. Around mid-October 1955, her left leg became swollen and turned purple. After her family urged her to eat something, Sasaki requested tea on rice and remarked, "it's good". She then thanked her family, those being her last words. With her family and friends around her, Sasaki died on the morning of October 25, 1955, at the age of 12.

After her death, Sasaki's body was examined by the Atomic Bomb Casualty Commission (ABCC) for research on the effects of the atomic bomb on the human body before she was cremated.

== Memorials ==
After her death, Sasaki's friends and schoolmates published a collection of letters in order to raise funds to build a memorial to her and all of the children who had died from the effects of the atomic bomb, including another Japanese girl Yoko Moriwaki. In 1958, a statue of Sasaki holding a golden crane was unveiled in the Hiroshima Peace Memorial Park. At the foot of the statue is a plaque that reads: "This is our cry. This is our prayer. Peace in the world." Every year during the Obon holiday, which is a holiday in Japan to remember the departed spirits of one's ancestors, thousands of people leave paper cranes near the statue. A paper crane database has been established online for contributors to leave a message of peace and to keep a record of those who have donated cranes.

Sasaki and the family have donated some of Sadako's cranes at places of importance around the world: in NYC at the National September 11 Memorial & Museum, at Pearl Harbor, Hawaii, at the Harry S. Truman Presidential Library and Museum on November 19, 2015, at Museum of Tolerance on May 26, 2016, and the Japanese American National Museum three days later. USS Arizona Memorial Crane Donation and President Truman Museum Donation helped by Clifton Truman Daniel, who is the grandson of President Truman. A statue of Sasaki was erected in the Seattle Peace Park before being stolen in July 2024. It remains missing.

Sasaki has become a leading symbol of the effects of nuclear war and has become an international symbol for peace and a peaceful world, especially during the ongoing 2022 Russian invasion of Ukraine.

Sasaki is also a hero for many girls in Japan. Her story is told in some Japanese schools on the anniversary of the Hiroshima bombing. Dedicated to Sasaki, people all over Japan celebrate August 6 as the annual peace day.

Artist Sue DiCicco founded the Peace Crane Project in 2013 to celebrate Sasaki's legacy and connect students around the world in a vision of peace. DiCicco and Sasaki's brother co-wrote a book about Sasaki, The Complete Story of Sadako Sasaki, hoping to bring her true story to English speaking countries. Their website offers a study guide for students and an opportunity to "Ask Masahiro".

In Anchorage, Alaska, Sasaki’s legacy is honored through a permanent exhibit—“The Legacy of Sadako”—at the University of Alaska Anchorage (UAA) and Alaska Pacific University (APU) Consortium Library. The exhibit, opened on May 27, 2018, was organized in part by a delegation of students, including from Colony High School, Mat-Su College, and UAA, who visited Japan to meet Sasaki’s brother, Masahiro Sasaki.

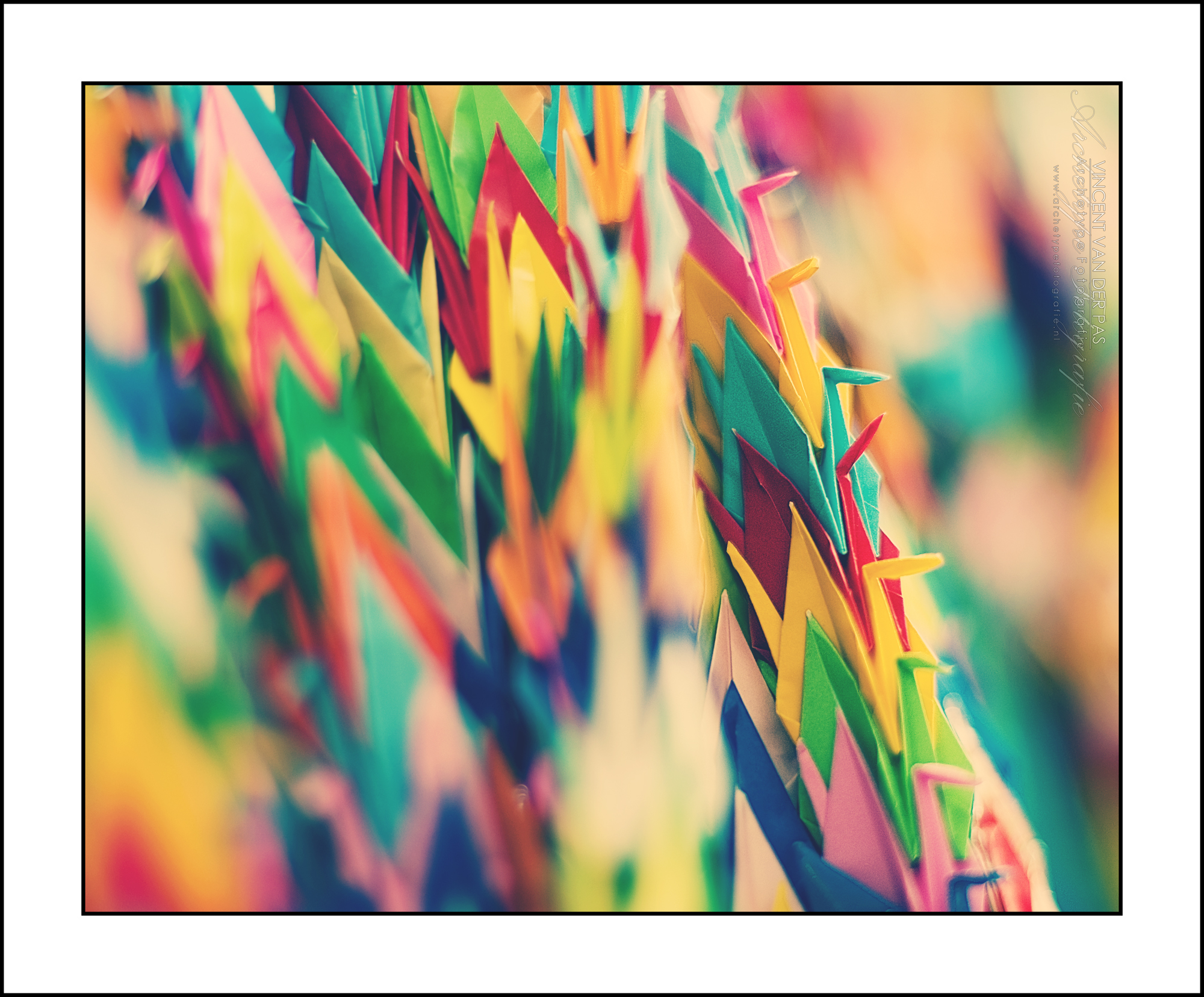
Cranes created by Japanese children from all over the country

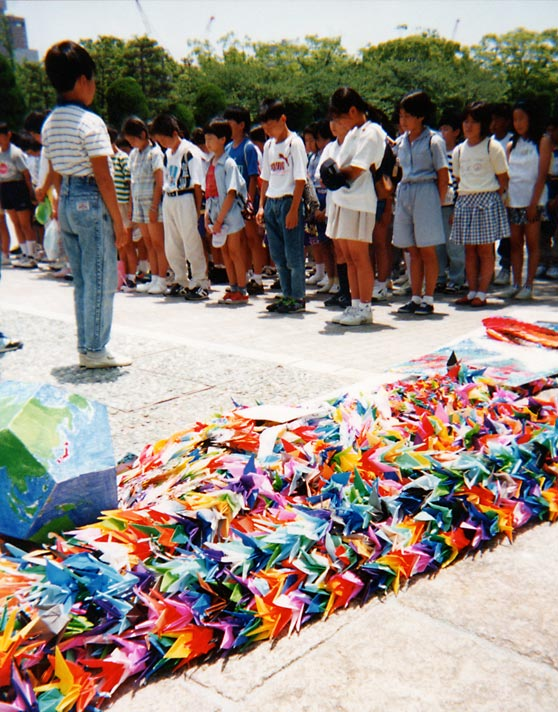
Japanese schoolchildren dedicating a collection of cranes in Hiroshima Peace Park

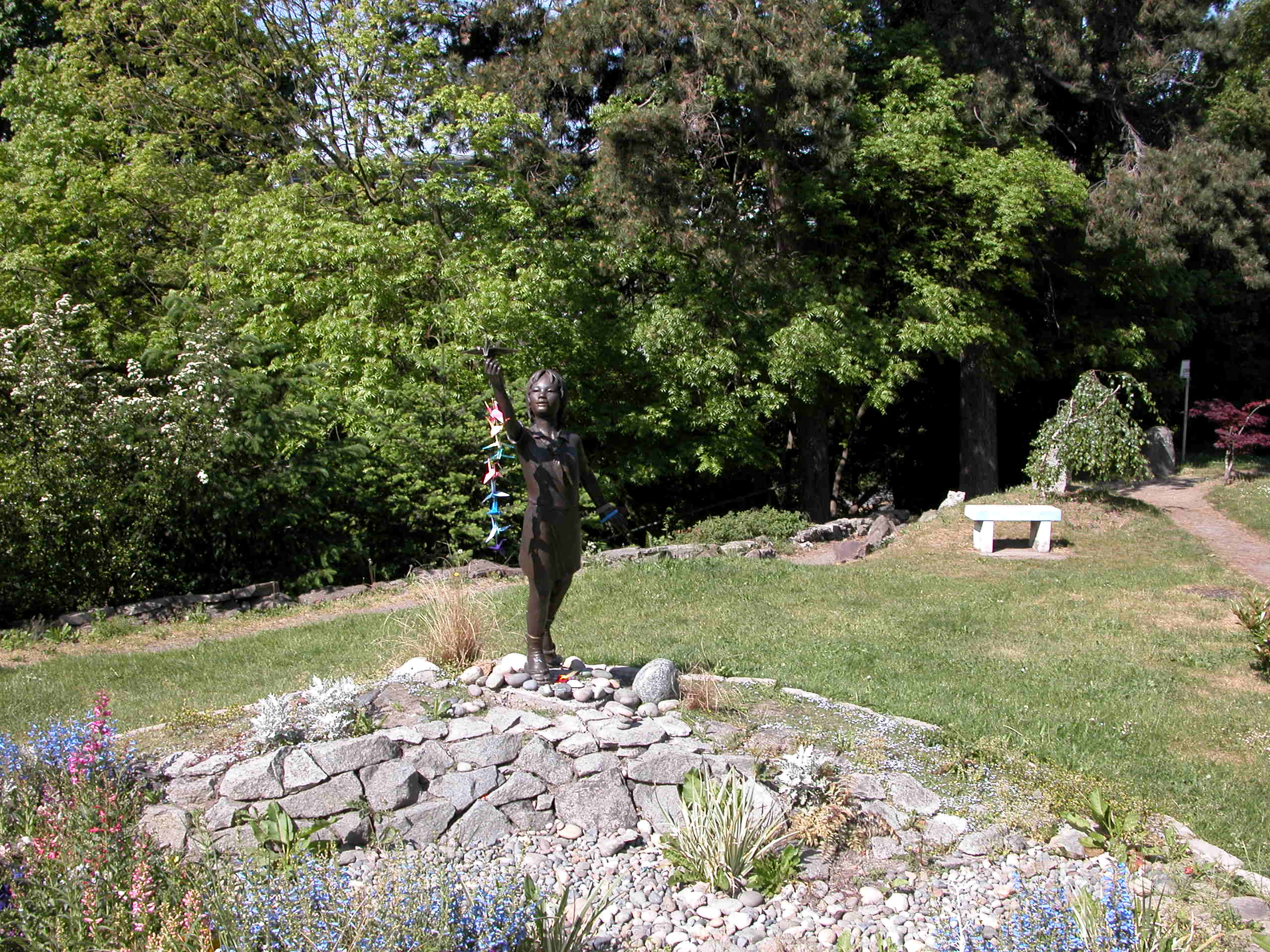
Sadako Sasaki statue in Peace Park in Seattle, Washington

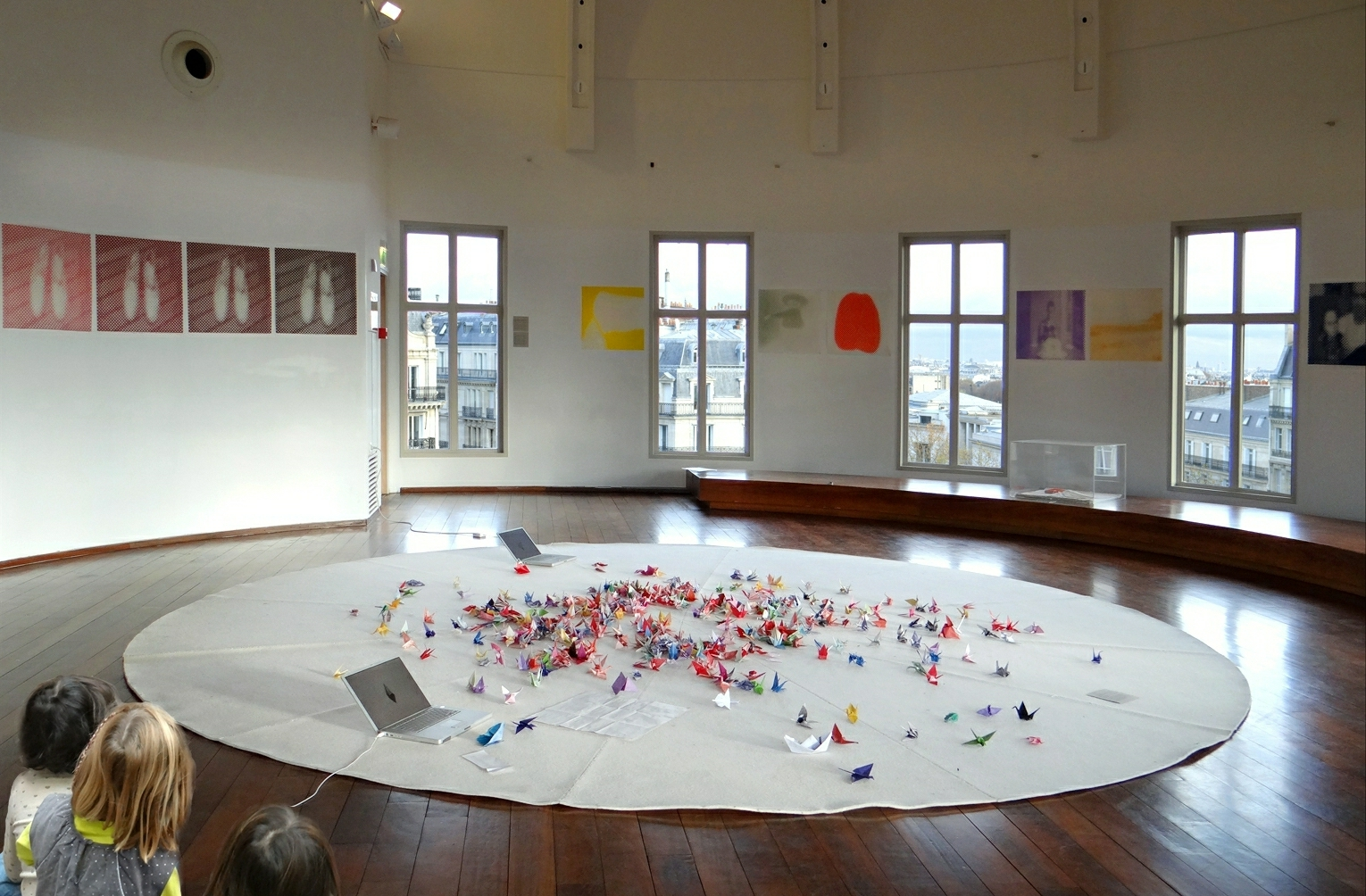
Memorial in Paris, France

== In popular culture ==
The best known version of Sasaki's story is Sadako and the Thousand Paper Cranes, a children's historical novel written by Canadian-American author Eleanor Coerr and published in 1977.

Her story has become familiar to many schoolchildren around the world through the novels The Day of the Bomb (1961, in German, Sadako will leben) by the Austrian writer Karl Bruckner. Sadako is also briefly mentioned in Children of the Ashes, Robert Jungk's historical account of the lives of Hiroshima victims and survivors and about Japan World War II.

The death of Sasaki inspired Dagestani Russian poet Rasul Gamzatov, who had paid a visit to the city of Hiroshima, to write an Avar poem, "Zhuravli", which eventually became one of Russia's greatest war ballads.

A fictionalized version of Sadako appears as a character in the Soviet film Hello, Children! (Zdravstvuite, deti!), directed by Mark Donskoy.

Sasaki's life and death are also the subject of the song "Cranes over Hiroshima" by American singer-songwriter Fred Small.

Sadako's story was dramatized at the opening ceremony of the Goodwill Games 1990 in Seattle when, to Ellie Rabb's narration of Sadako's story, some 400 local schoolchildren handed out some 20,000 origami paper cranes to the opening day crowd, thereby honoring the memory of Sadako and spreading her unfulfilled dream for world peace. The Seattle souvenir cranes were supposedly crafted from an original 1,000 pieces sent over by children from Japan.

Laurie Rubin and Jenny Taira, co-founders and artistic directors of Ohana Arts, a children's theater and arts organization based in Honolulu, Hawai'i, wrote a musical for young performers called "Peace on Your Wings", based on the life of Sadako and her message of hope and peace for the world. The musical has been performed across the United States and has the support and approval of members of Sadako's surviving family.

The 2016 album Wanderer by the death metal/metalcore band Heaven Shall Burn features a song called "Passage of the Crane" dedicated to her story, as does "Sadako's Wings of Hope" on Niobeth's 2008 album Silvery Moonbeams.

The 2020 album Sadako e le mille gru di carta by Italian progressive rock band LogoS is a tribute to Sadako's legacy, and was released on the 75th anniversary of the Hiroshima bombing.

The song "Unfinished Dream Of Sadako" by the Iranian post-rock band Crows in the Rain is dedicated to her story.

== See also ==
- Story of Sadako Sasaki in Marathi
- Children of Hiroshima
- The Day of the Bomb
- Hiroshima Maidens
- Hiroshima Witness
- Orizuru
- Sadako and the Thousand Paper Cranes
