= Schmoe (surname) =

Schmoe is a surname. Notable people with the surname include:

- Floyd Schmoe (1895–2001), American pacifist and author
- Rebecca Schmoe (fl. from 2022), American politician and member of the Kansas House of Representatives
