= Spirit (sculpture) =

Coordinates: 39.6640°N 105.2030°W

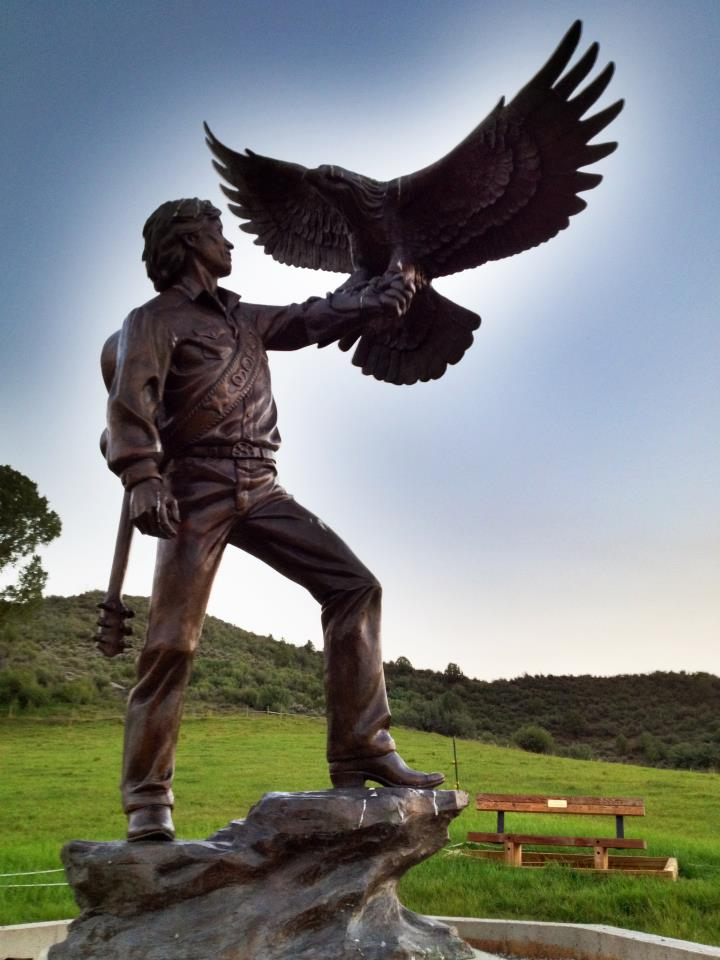
- The statue on the Windstar Foundation land in Snowmass, Colorado in 2013
- Artist: Sue DiCicco
- Completion date: 2002
- Medium: Bronze
- Location: Colorado Music Hall of Fame, Morrison, Colorado

Spirit is a 2002 bronze sculpture depicting John Denver, by American sculptor Sue DiCicco. Originally commissioned by and located at the Windstar Foundation, the bronze is now located at the Colorado Music Hall of Fame at Red Rocks. It was cast at Artworks Foundry in Berkeley, California, and was named "Spirit" by Rolland Smith, who served as master of ceremonies at the unveiling in October 2002. The statue was financed by Denver's fans.

== Design ==
The statue shows singer and songwriter John Denver holding a large eagle in his left hand, with his guitar slung over his back. Its total height is 143 inches (3.63 m), the base dimension 54 by 32.25 inches (137.2 cm × 81.9 cm). The total wingspan of the eagle is 75 inches (190 cm), and the statue's weight is estimated at 1,300 pounds (590 kg), making it a painstaking process to move it from one place to another.

== Background ==
The statue was originally commissioned by the Windstar Foundation, an environmental non-profit organization that Denver founded in the 1970s. Since its unveiling in 2002, the Spirit statue was a fixture at the Windstar property in Snowmass, Colorado, but it was moved following the dissolution of the Windstar Foundation. The Windstar property was sold in early 2013.

== Current location ==
In September 2013, after the Windstar Foundation was dissolved and its assets sold, the Spirit statue was removed from the Snowmass property and given to the Colorado Music Hall of Fame. Spirit moved with the Colorado Music Hall of Fame to its new location at Red Rocks in 2015.

Although some of Denver's fans were upset to see the Windstar property sold and the Spirit statue moved, most people – including Denver's former wife – think the Colorado Music Hall of Fame is a fitting location for the massive statue. Denver was the first performer inducted into the Colorado Music Hall of Fame in April 2011.
