= Peace Crane Project =

Organization

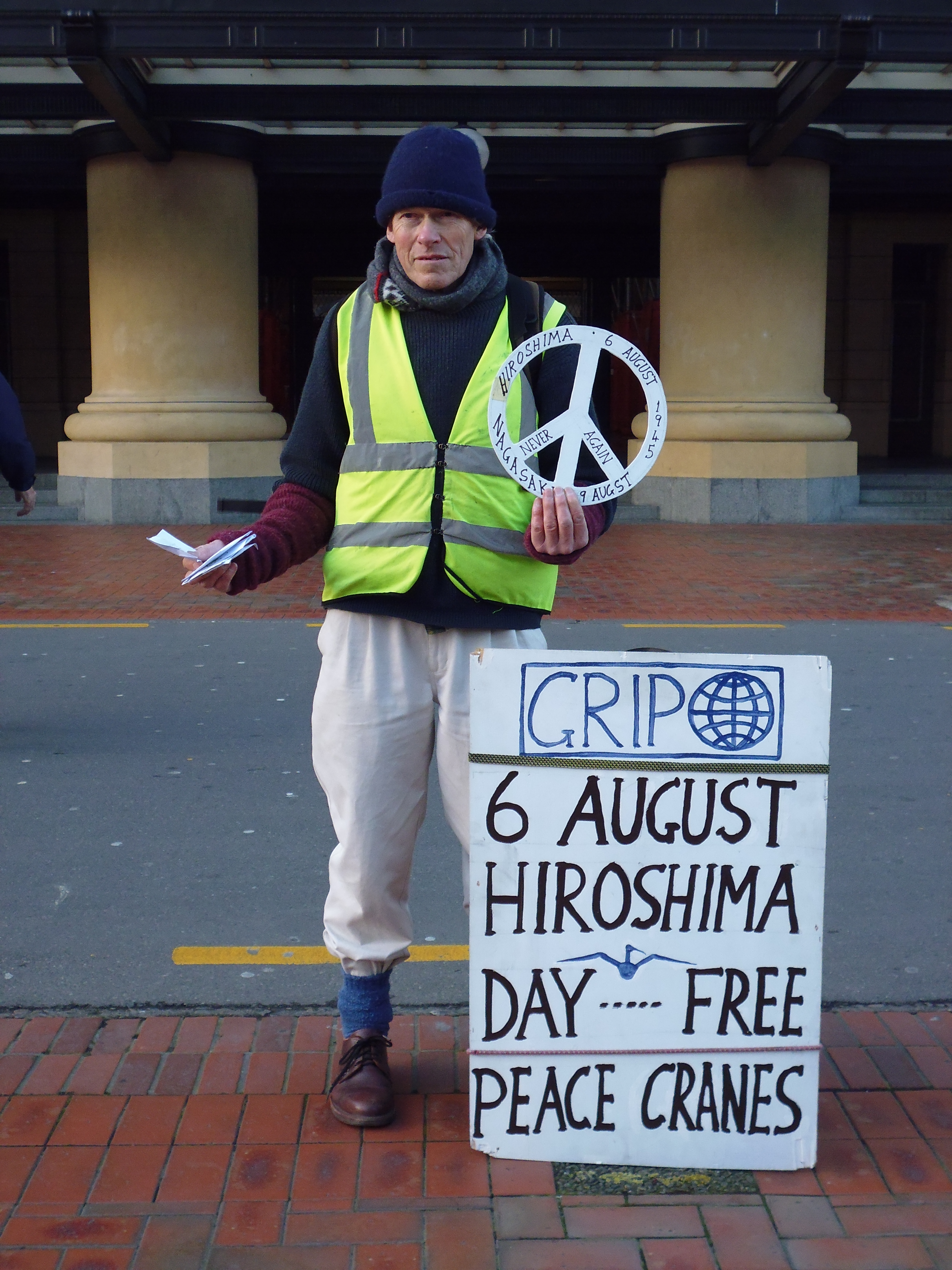
An activist in Wellington handing out "free peace cranes" and holding a sign on Hiroshima Day (6 August) in 2014

The Peace Crane Project was founded in 2013 by Sue DiCicco, in order to promote world peace and raise awareness of the International Day of Peace (21 September).

A "peace crane" is an origami crane used as peace symbol, by reference to the story of Sadako Sasaki (1943–1955), a Japanese victim of the long-term effects of the nuclear bombing of Hiroshima in 1945. Sasaki was one of the most widely known hibakusha (Japanese for "bomb-affected person"), said to have folded one thousand origami cranes before her death.

The Peace Crane Project participated in the 20th Annual Sadako Peace Day, hosted by the Nuclear Age Peace Foundation in Montecito (2014).

Participants in the Peace Crane Project are asked to fold an origami crane and then sign up on the website to exchange their crane with someone in a different city, state, country or continent. They are encouraged to take a photo of their crane after placing it in their community, and to upload the photo online. In Bangalore, India, over sixty schools took part in the peace crane exchange in 2013.

The Peace Crane Project announced a new initiative for 2017, inviting students around the world to fold a crane and include it in a traveling exhibit of 1,000 cranes which will appear at a variety of venues over the next several years. Purpose Global in 2016 included the Peace Crane Project a "list of the 500 most influential global initiatives for peace".

Ellen DeGeneres tweeted about The Peace Crane Project on Peace Day in 2019, encouraging her followers to participate.
