= Wymberley D. Coerr =

American politician and diplomat

Wymberley deRenne Coerr
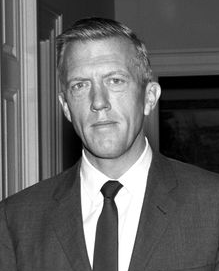

United States Ambassador to Ecuador
- In office March 24, 1965 – October 7, 1967
- President: Lyndon B. Johnson
- Preceded by: Maurice M. Bernbaum
- Succeeded by: Edson O. Sessions

United States Ambassador to Uruguay
- In office July 27, 1962 – January 22, 1965
- President: John F. Kennedy
- Preceded by: Edward J. Sparks
- Succeeded by: Henry A. Hoyt

Assistant Secretary of State for Inter-American Affairs (acting)
- In office April 20, 1961 – July 17, 1961
- President: John F. Kennedy
- Preceded by: Thomas C. Mann
- Succeeded by: Robert F. Woodward

Personal details
- Born: October 2, 1913 New York City, U.S.
- Died: October 5, 1996 (aged 83) Ajijic, Mexico
- Spouses: Janet Hill (m. 1937, divorced) Eleanor Page (m. 1965)

Wymberley deRenne Coerr (October 2, 1913 - October 5, 1996) was an American diplomat and politician who served as the Ambassador to Uruguay from 1962 to 1965 and as the Ambassador to Ecuador from 1965 to 1967. Additionally, he was the acting Assistant Secretary for Inter-American Affairs for about three months in 1961.

== Early life ==
Wymberley deRenne Coerr was born in New York City on October 2, 1913. He was a graduate of The Hill School in Pottstown, Pennsylvania, and in 1936, he graduated from Yale University. For his post-graduate studies, Coerr studied at the University of Paris, as well as the National War College.

== Career ==
=== Early foreign service career ===
On January 3, 1940, Coerr was appointed to serve as a vice consul of career, and secretary in the diplomatic service by President Franklin D. Roosevelt, with his first foreign service post that year, sending him to the consulate general in Montreal. On June 2, 1941, Coerr was moved to the consulate in La Ceiba, Honduras. On March 25, 1943, he would move to Mexico City to serve as secretary and vice-consul there. He resigned from the foreign service on January 15, 1944, to serve as the manager and education director of a business. However, he was appointed to the vice-consulship in Suva, Fiji, on June 15, 1947. Following that, he served as the deputy chief of mission in Honduras and Guatemala. In 1959, he served as the chargé d'affaires of the embassy in La Paz, Bolivia, where he was awarded by the State Department for supervising the destruction of confidential files while anti-American forces attacked the mission on March 4, 1959.

=== Acting Assistant Secretary for Inter-American Affairs (1961) ===
Prior to becoming acting assistant secretary, Coerr as the Western United States office affairs director and principal deputy assistant secretary for the Bureau of Inter-American Affairs. In 1961, Coerr helped draft a speech for incumbent John F. Kennedy, which urged the Organization of American States to help advance the work of the Alliance for Progress.

=== Ambassador to Uruguay (1962-1965) ===
Coerr was appointed Ambassador to Uruguay on June 7, 1962. Following the 1962 Peruvian coup d'état, Coerr was responsible for reporting the Uruguayan government's response to a US inquiry on whether to take joint action in the region, which Uruguay hailed as "not in accord with proper diplomatic procedure." His mission was terminated on January 22, 1965.

=== Ambassador to Ecuador (1965-1967) ===
On January 1, 1965, President Lyndon B. Johnson named Coerr to the Ambassador to Ecuador position, and on February 4 of that year, Coerr was officially appointed ambassador.

On October 7, 1967, the Ecuadorian government requested Coerr to be recalled from his mission, accusing him of criticizing President Otto Arosemena. These accusations came after a speech in support of the Alliance for Progress he gave at the Colegio Americano in Quito, which quoted numerous remarks made by Arosemena. This came after Arosemena refused to sign the presidential declaration at the American Summit in Punta del Este that previous April, desiring more aid for Latin America and criticizing the Alliance for Progress. The State Department called the recall request "an unexpected reaction." These accusation were further denied by Coerr, journalists, and other government officials. Regardless, Coerr left his post two days later, on October 9. Following his expulsion, journalist Drew Pearson described him as "doing one of the best jobs of the many highly qualified men the State Department has sent lately to Latin America," while a Washington Post editorial described him as an "experienced practitioner of enlightened hemispheric diplomacy."

=== Later career ===
Following his ouster, Coerr was an assistant secretary of the State Department's security affairs organization. Starting in 1974, he served as the director of international programs at the Smithsonian Institution until his retirement in 1976.

== Personal life ==
Coerr first married Janet Hill in 1937, however this marriage ended in divorce. He then married author Eleanor Coerr (née Page) in 1965. He had a son, Stanton, and a daughter, Susan. During his time in office, he resided in New Haven, Connecticut, however post-retirement, he resided in McLean, Virginia, up until the three months prior to his death.

=== Death ===
Coerr died on October 5, 1996, at a hospital in Ajijic, Mexico, where he and his wife had lived for the past three months, due to complications of Parkinson's disease. He was 83.
