= Origami paper =

Paper used for origami, the art of Japanese paper folding

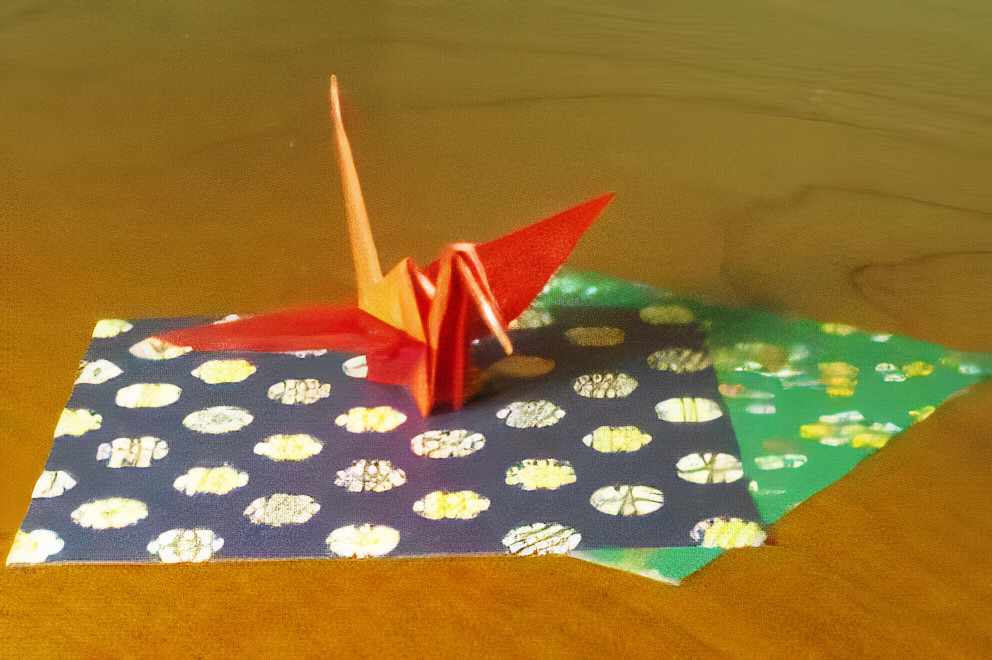
Origami paper and a traditional origami crane

Origami paper is the paper used for origami, the art of Japanese paper folding. The only real requirement of the folding medium is that it must be able to hold a crease, but should ideally also be thinner than regular paper for convenience when multiple folds over the same small paper area are required (e.g. such as would be the case if creating an origami bird's "legs", "feet", and "beak").

== Kami ==
Kami, or koiy paper, is the cheapest paper made specifically for origami, and the most widely available. It was developed for use in schools. The word kami is simply Japanese for paper, but it has acquired this specific meaning.

Kami is thin and easy to fold. It is usually printed only on one side, with a solid color or pattern. These patterns can be as simple as a gradation from red to blue, or as complex as a multi-colored kimono pattern of flowers and cranes with gold foil embellishments. Kami comes in several sizes, but standard sizes include 75 × 75 mm (about 3 × 3 inches), 6-inch squares and 10-inch squares.

== Paper-backed foil ==
This medium is a slightly more expensive, flashier, paper that is good for retaining creases called paper-backed foil paper, Japanese foil, or simply foil. Foil paper is composed of a thin layer of foil adhered to an extremely thin sheet of paper. The most common colors are silver and gold, but any color is possible in foil paper including bright pink, blue and copper. In many multi-color packs, one sheet each of silver and gold paper is included. These are usually placed on the bottom end of the string if used in a thousand origami cranes.

== Washi ==
Washi is traditionally a fine handmade thin paper coveted by artists and craftspeople. Washi is made with renewable long-fibered crops and is very strong even when thin. Some washi does not hold a sharp fold due to the extremely long and thick fibers of the paper. Occasionally you will find strands of the long fibers (often kozo) in washi. Washi is also accepting of ink, making it easy to print on as it holds very fine detail. Printed washi has a unique and occasionally transparent texture. Washi paper is not as commonly used as kami paper in origami.

== Chiyogami / Yuzen ==
Chiyogami refers to Japanese hand-screened decorative kozo washi / paper consisting of repetitive patterns. “Chiyo” means 1,000 generations and "gami” means paper. Originally the design was applied to handmade kozo paper with wood blocks, but today most chiyogami is produced with silkscreen techniques.

Paper was one of the major materials used in making toys and dolls. The brightly printed chino-gami of Edo (Tokyo) and Kyoto and the crisp strength of newly laid kozo paper were fully utilized. Many urban housewives and girls with the spare time for a hobby have taken up the making of sophisticated paper dolls and figurines – both traditional and modern – and provide a steady and major market for the makers of highly decorative colored papers.

== Banknotes ==
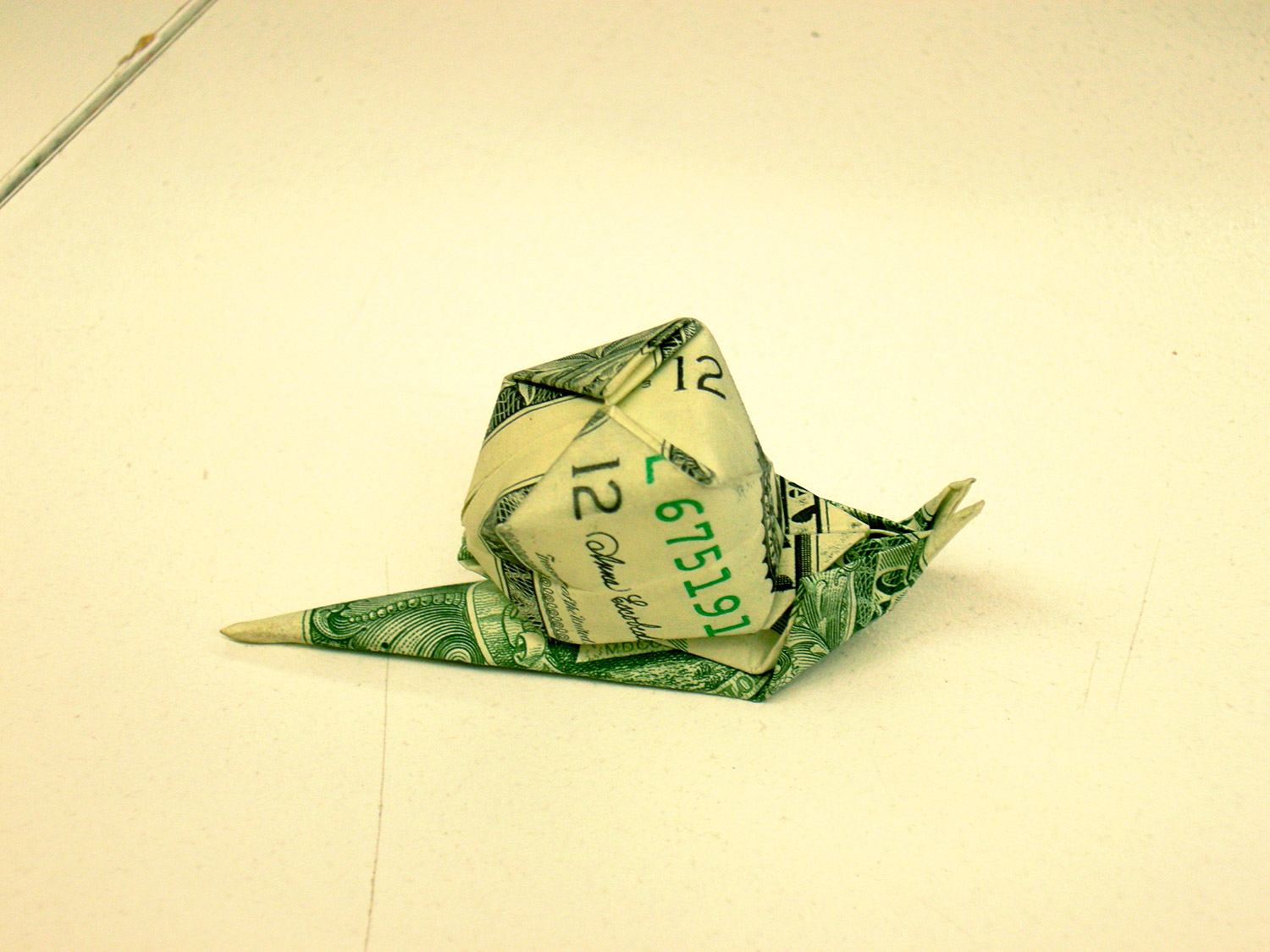
An origami snail that is made out of a dollar bill.

Banknotes may be used to fold models as well. Banknotes are common media for folding as the subject in the obverse of the banknote can make a striking appearance on the finished model.
