= Children's Peace Monument =

Monument in Hiroshima, Japan

Hiroshima Children's Peace Memorial
- The Children's Peace Monument, with a figure of Sadako Sasaki at the top of the statue, and a boy and a girl at the sides. The glass cases in the background contain paper cranes.
- Interactive map of Hiroshima Children's Peace Memorial
- Type: Children's Memorial for Child Victims of Nuclear and conventional War
- Location: Hiroshima, Japan
- Coordinates: 34°23′39″N 132°27′10″E
- Created: May 5, 1958
- Status: Open all year
- Website: Hiroshima Peace Memorial Park

The Children's Peace Monument (原爆の子の像, Genbaku no Ko no Zō; lit. "Atomic Bomb Children Statue") is a monument for peace to commemorate Sadako Sasaki and the thousands of child victims of the atomic bombing of Hiroshima. This monument is located in Hiroshima, Japan. Sadako Sasaki, a young girl, died of leukemia on October 25, 1955 from radiation of the atomic bomb dropped on Hiroshima on 6 August 1945.

== Overview ==
The monument is located in Hiroshima Peace Memorial Park in Hiroshima, Japan. Designed by native artists Kazuo Kikuchi and Kiyoshi Ikebe, the monument was built using money derived from a fund-raising campaign by Japanese school children, including Sadako Sasaki's classmates, with the main statue entitled "Atomic Bomb Children". The statue was unveiled on 5 May 1958, the Japanese Children's Day holiday. Sadako Sasaki, who died of an atomic bomb disease radiation poisoning is immortalized at the top of the statue, where she holds a wire crane above her head. Shortly before she passed, she had a vision to create a thousand cranes. Japanese tradition says that if one creates a thousand cranes, they are granted one wish. Sadako's wish was to have a world without nuclear weapons. Thousands of origami cranes from all over the world are offered around the monument. They serve as a sign that the children who make them and those who visit the statue desire a world without nuclear war, having been tied to the statue by the story that Sadako died from radiation-induced leukemia after folding just under a thousand cranes, wishing for world peace. However, an exhibit which appeared in the Hiroshima Peace Memorial Museum stated that by the end of August 1955, Sadako had achieved her 1000-crane goal and continued to fold more cranes. Unfortunately, her wish was not granted and she died of the leukemia on October 25, 1955. Her main cause of death was from the radiation poisoning from the atomic bomb Little Boy. The organization, Nihon Hidankyo, received the Nobel Peace Prize on October 11, 2024, for their effort to create a world free of nuclear weapons and to prove through eyewitness testimony that nuclear weapons should never be used again.

== Monument ==
Beneath the main structure hangs a bronze crane that works as a wind chime when pushed against a traditional peace bell from which it is suspended. The two pieces were donated by Nobel Prize winner, Hideki Yukawa.

At the base of the monument is a black marble slab on which is inscribed in Japanese:

これはぼくらの叫びです これは私たちの祈りです 世界に平和をきずくための
(Kore wa bokura no sakebi desu. Kore wa watashitachi no inori desu. Sekai ni heiwa o kizuku tame no).
"This is our cry, this is our prayer: for building peace in the world".

The figures that surround the monument are two children, a boy and a girl, representing both the tens of thousands of children who, like Sadako, died because of the atomic bombing in Hiroshima as well as the children around the world who desire peace.

These glass cases display paper crane offerings around the Children's Peace Monument.

Today, people can donate cranes they have folded in honor of Sadako and others. The paper crane functions as a symbol of peace, which was her wish.

== See also ==
- Hiroshima Witness
