= Sadako and the Thousand Paper Cranes =

1977 children's historical novel by Eleanor Coerr

- First edition
- Author: Eleanor Coerr
- Illustrator: Ronald Himler
- Language: English
- Series: None
- Subject: A child with leukemia from radiation caused by the atomic bombing of Hiroshima
- Genre: Children's non-fiction literature
- Publisher: G. P. Putnam's Sons
- Publication date: 1977
- Publication place: Canada
- Media type: Print
- Pages: 81
- ISBN: 9780399205200

Sadako and the Thousand Paper Cranes is a children's historical novel written by Canadian-American author Eleanor Coerr and published in 1977. It is based on the true story of Sadako Sasaki, a victim of the atomic bombing of Hiroshima, Japan, in World War II, who set out to create a thousand origami cranes when dying of leukemia from radiation caused by the bomb.

The book has been translated into many languages and published in many places, to be used for peace education programs in primary schools.

== Plot overview ==
After being diagnosed with leukemia from radiation caused by the atomic bombing of Hiroshima, Sadako's friend told her to fold origami paper cranes (orizuru) in hope of making a thousand of them. She was inspired to do so by the Japanese legend that one who created a thousand origami cranes would be granted a wish. Her wish was simply to live through her disease so she could fulfill her dream of being on the running team. In this retelling of her story, she managed to fold only 644 cranes before she became too weak to fold any more, and died in her sleep on the morning of October 25, 1955, knowing her family will always be there. Her friends and family helped finish her dream by folding the rest of the cranes, which were buried with Sadako.

== Discrepancies in the story ==
The claim in Coerr's book that Sadako "died before completing the 1000 cranes, and her two friends completed the task, placing the finished cranes in her casket" is disputed by her surviving family members. According to her family, and especially her older brother Masahiro Sasaki, who speaks on his sister's life at events, Sadako not only exceeded 644 cranes, she exceeded her goal of 1,000 and died having folded approximately 1,450 paper cranes. In his book, The Complete Story of Sadako Sasaki (2018) co-written with Sue DiCicco, founder of the Peace Crane Project, Masahiro says Sadako exceeded her goal.

== Film adaptations ==
Sadako and the Thousand Paper Cranes, a short film directed by George Levenson, co-written by Coerr and Levenson and starring Liv Ullmann as narrator, was released in 1991. The soundtrack, an album of the same name with narration by Ullman and music by George Winston, was released in 1995.

In November 2015, Japanese American filmmaker Miyuki Sohara made Orizuru 2015 (orizuru being the Japanese word for paper cranes), an educational short film for children. This film was selected by Hiroshima International Film Festival in 2015 and afterwards was released in Los Angeles on May 27, 2016, at its US premiere screening. This film is a friendship story and made with Los Angeles schoolchildren, Hollywood actors, and crews. Sadako's nephew appears in film and sings a song about Sadako's life, "Inori". At the same time, Sohara coordinated Sadako's two crane donations to the Museum of Tolerance and the Japanese American National Museum.

In 2019, Evolving Pictures Entertainment started producing a film tentatively entitled Sadako and the Magic of Paper Cranes, written by British filmmaker Malcolm Clarke. The story chronicled a group of fifth grade students from Albuquerque, New Mexico, inspired by their teacher, who dream of building a monument to honor the legend and spirit of Sadako.

Also in 2019, a film titled One Thousand Paper Cranes, directed by Richard Raymond, was announced to begin production, with Evan Rachel Wood playing Eleanor Coerr, telling the story of Coerr and Sadako and "how their lives are intricately connected."

== Related works and impact ==
The Bell Shakespeare theatre company in Sydney, Australia, mounted a production of Sadako and the Thousand Paper Cranes during its 1997 season, and again in 2000. They performed it on weekdays, for primary schools.

Sasaki has become a leading symbol of peace that is taught in Japanese schools on the anniversary of the Hiroshima bombing. In dedication to her, people all over the world celebrate August 6 as the annual Peace Day.

== See also ==
- Children's Peace Monument
- Hiroshima Witness
- Peace Park (Seattle)
- Orizuru
