= Shin's Tricycle =

1992 children's book by Tatsuharu Kodama

- Shin's Tricycle by Tatsuharu Kodama (Walker & Company English version)
- Author: Tatsuharu Kodama
- Translator: Kazuko Hokumen-Jones (Walker & Company English)
- Illustrator: Makoto Obo (Japanese, Chart Company English), Noriyuki Ando (Walker & Company English)
- Language: Japanese
- Genre: Children's literature
- Publisher: Doshinsha (original Japanese); Walker & Company (English, ISBN 978-0-8027-8376-9); Chart Institute (チャート研究所) version (ISBN 978-4-410-37721-1)
- Publication date: June 30, 1992 (original Japanese); August 1995 (Walker & Company English)
- Publication place: Japan
- Media type: Print (hardback)
- Pages: 32 pp
- ISBN: 978-4-494-00854-4

Shin's Tricycle is a children's book by Tatsuharu Kodama (児玉辰春, Kodama Tatsuharu), first published in Japanese in 1992 as Shin-chan no-san rin sha (伸ちゃんのさんりんしゃ) by Doshinsha. It relates the true story of Shinichi Tetsutani (鉄谷 伸一, Tetsutani Shin'ichi) or Shin (伸ちゃん, Shin-chan), a three-year-old boy who was killed in the atomic bombing of Hiroshima, Japan on August 6, 1945.

Makoto Obo made the illustrations of the original Japanese version of the book, as well as those of the English version by Chart Institute (チャート研究所), which is only distributed to schools and not for retail sale. The Chart book is part of the organization's Treasure Island Series. Noriyuki Ando made the illustrations for Walker and Company's English version, released in 1995, which is distributed in the United States.

The Walker and Company version was released around the 50th anniversary of the atomic bombings of Hiroshima and Nagasaki. Sara Mosle of The New Yorker stated that the version "was obviously designed for teachers to use as an introduction to lessons" about that subject.

== Synopsis ==
Kodama, himself a survivor of the bombing of Hiroshima, narrates the story from the point of view of Shin's father, Nobuo Tetsutani (鉄谷信男, Tetsutani Nobuo). Shinichi is playing on his tricycle when the bomb is detonated. Nobuo finds the barely alive Shin still holding onto the tricycle's handlebars and trapped under the rubble of their destroyed home. Nobuo's efforts to save his son are in vain and Shin dies that evening. Nobuo buries Shin with his tricycle.

Forty years later, Nobuo exhumes Shin and his two sisters, who also died in the bombing, in order to give them a proper burial at a cemetery. While digging everything up, a pipe was found, believed to be a part of the tricycle Shinichi had owned. Not long after, they found skeletal remains of two human hands; the remains were identified as Shinichi and his local friend, Kimiko ("Kimi"), who had died together with him, holding his hand. Nobuo donated the tricycle to the Hiroshima Peace Museum, where it is currently on display.

Ando's artwork is made up of oil paintings. John Philbrook of the San Francisco Public Library, in School Library Journal, described Ando's artwork as "somber and moody".

== Reception ==
Kirkus Reviews stated that the artwork of Ando is "expertly rendered, polished". Kirkus concluded "no one will get through a reading of it unmoved."

Hazel Rochman, in Booklist, gave the Walker & Company book a starred review. She praised the "powerful, almost super-real at times" artwork by Ando.

Publishers Weekly stated that the story is "disturbing but undeniably powerful" and the pictures by Ando are "as frightening as they are effective."

The Walker and Company version's recommended age readership was ages 7 to 10. Publishers Weekly stated that the book "doesn't cushion the horror in his tale" and it recommended that "age guidelines should be observed here." Rochman recommended the books for "middle-graders" and that they should discuss the book with adults. Mosle argued that the Walker and Company version was inappropriate for its intended readers.

The book has subsequently been praised for its powerful treatment of the subject matter.

== Legacy ==
Alyson Miller, author of "Atomic Bomb Literature for Children: Kodama Tatsuharu's The Lunch Box and Shin's Tricycle," wrote that the book had "very little scholarship or critical attention."
