= Windstar Foundation =

The Windstar Foundation
- Formation: 1976
- Founder: John Denver; Thomas Crum
- Dissolved: October 2012
- Type: Environmental education, humanitarian
- Purpose: Environmental education and humanitarian organization
- Headquarters: Snowmass, Colorado, United States

The Windstar Foundation was an environmental education and humanitarian organization founded by John Denver and Thomas Crum in 1976 to conserve 1,000 acres (400 ha) of land in Snowmass, Colorado, where it had its headquarters.

Windstar educated all age groups about the environment on a world-wide level.

The Foundation closed its doors in October 2012, voted to dissolve, and sold its property for $8.5 million in early 2013. All but 30 acres of the land is subject to a conservation easement which prohibits development. Rocky Mountain Institute, which had its headquarters on the unprotected 30 acres and owned a 50% interest in the property, plans to move to Basalt, Colorado. Windstar's $4-million portion of the proceeds was donated to an Aspen charity.
