= Sue DiCicco =

American sculptor, children's book author and illustrator

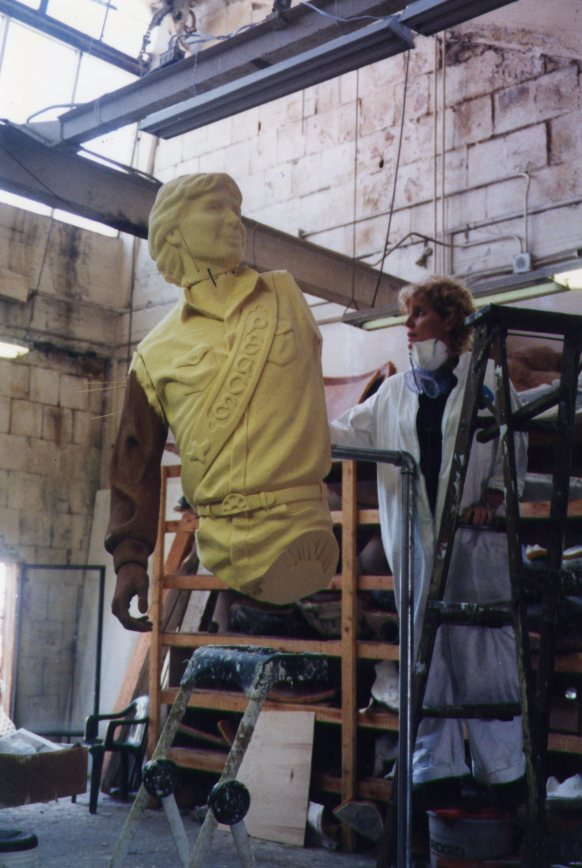
Sue DiCicco sculpting the John Denver 'Spirit' Statue

Sue DiCicco (born April 28, 1959) is an American sculptor, children's book author and illustrator, and founder of Armed with the Arts and the Peace Crane Project.

== Career ==
DiCicco was born in Southern California, and started in the film industry as an animator at the Walt Disney Company, having attended the California Institute of the Arts. Her classmates were Tim Burton, John Lasseter, Chris Buck and Joe Ranft. After two years at Cal Arts, she worked for Disney and other studios as an animator, before opening her own studio. She is best known for her many children's books and creating The Peace Crane Project.

== Publishing ==
DiCicco has written dozens and illustrated hundreds of children's storybooks. In the 1990s she often teamed with her late husband Gil DiCicco, as both DiCicco Studios and DiCicco Digital Arts. Since 2014, DiCicco has been the illustrator for many Classic Golden Books, including Poky Little Puppy, Shy Little Kitten, Tawny Scrawny Lion, Tootle, and The Little Red Caboose. DiCicco most recently co-wrote a book about Sadako Sasaki with Sadako's older brother, Masahiro Sasaki.

== John Denver ==
DiCicco was commissioned to sculpt a heroic sized John Denver statue for the Windstar Foundation in 2002. In 2013, the Windstar Foundation closed its doors and donated the statue to the Colorado Music Hall of Fame. The statue was unveiled at its new location at Red Rocks Amphitheatre near Morrison, Colorado in spring 2015. The bronze study for the statue is used as a fundraiser and as the annual "John Denver Spirit Award". The initial sketch of the statue was used by the Taylor Guitar Company to create limited edition of John Denver guitar, released in 2003.

== Armed with the Arts and The Peace Crane Project ==
In early 2013, DiCicco founded Armed with the Arts, with the goal of arming children with the skills to express themselves creatively. In addition to hosting the Peace Crane Project each year, Armed with the Arts launched a worldwide singing event in 2015. The foundation announced a new Creative Book Award in 2018. Purpose Global included the Peace Crane Project in its inaugural list of the 500 most influential global initiatives for peace in 2016. Ellen DeGeneres tweeted about The Peace Crane Project on Peace Day in 2019, encouraging her followers to participate.

== Personal life ==
DiCicco married broadcast journalist Rolland Smith in 2021.

== Selected bibliography ==
- Walt Disney Presents The Little Mermaid (Golden Book/Western Publishing Company, 1989) (illustrator)
- Quints Clean Up (Golden Books Publishing, 1990) (illustrator)
- Disney's "Mickey's Spring Picnic" (Western Publishing Company, 1990) (illustrator)
- Disney's "Mickey and Goofy Take a Trip" (Western Publishing Company, 1990) (illustrator)
- Disney's "Minnie's Sunken Treasure" (Western Publishing Company, 1990) (illustrator)
- Walt Disney's "I Am Mickey Mouse" (Western Publishing Company, 1991) (First all digitally rendered children's book) (illustrator)
- Disney's TailSpin "Ghost Ship" (Golden Books Publishing, 1991) (illustrator)
- Disney Oh Bother! Someone's Fibbing!" (Western Publishing, 1991) (illustrator)
- Disney's Little Mermaid "Ariel's Secret" (Western Publishing, 1992) (illustrator)
- Disney Oh Bother! Someone's Grumpy!" (Western Publishing, 1992) (illustrator)
- Portrait of a Crime (Walt Disney Records, 1993) (as DiCicco Digital Arts) (illustrator)
- Robbery on the Overland Express (Walt Disney Records, 1993) (as DiCicco Digital Arts) (illustrator)
- The Pagemaster Storybook (Bedrock Press, 1994) (as DiCicco Digital Arts, with Len Smith) (illustrator)
- Disney Lullaby Songs (Walt Disney Records, 1994) (as DiCicco Digital Arts) (illustrator)
- Disney Nursery Rhyme Songs (Walt Disney Records, 1994) (as DiCicco Digital Arts) (illustrator)
- The Pagemaster Lift-A-Flap (Bedrock Press, 1994) (as DiCicco Digital Arts, with Len Smith) (illustrator)
- Disney's Beauty and the Beast "Belle's Missing Book" (Mouse Works, 1995) (as DiCicco Digital Arts)
- Disney's Pocahontas "Where's Percy?" (Mouse Works, 1995) (as DiCicco Digital Arts) (illustrator)
- Disney's Bambi "A Little Spring Shower" (Walt Disney Records, 1995) (as DiCicco Digital Arts) (illustrator)
- Disney's Lion King "Simba's Hide and Seek" (Walt Disney Records, 1995) (as DiCicco Digital Arts) (illustrator)
- Disney's Aladdin "Here Comes a Parade" (Walt Disney Records, 1995) (as DiCicco Digital Arts) (illustrator)
- Disney's Pocahontas "Flit Saves the Day" (Publications International, 1995) (as DiCicco Digital Arts) (illustrator)
- Disney's Pocahontas "Forest Friends" (Publications International, 1995) (as DiCicco Digital Arts) (illustrator)
- Disney's Pocahontas (Publications International, 1995) (as DiCicco Digital Arts with Andrew Phillipson) (illustrator)
- Disney's Hunchback of Notre Dame "Chasing Danger" (Mouse Works, 1996) (as DiCicco Digital Arts, paints only)
- Disney's Hunchback of Notre Dame "A Friend in Need" (Mouse Works, 1996) (as DiCicco Digital Arts) (illustrator)
- Disney's Hunchback of Notre Dame "Djali's Day Out" (Publications International, 1996) (as DiCicco Digital Arts) (illustrator)
- Disney's Hunchback of Notre Dame "Esmeralda's Merry Chase" (Publications International, 1996) (as DiCicco Digital Arts) (illustrator)
- Disney's Hunchback of Notre Dame "Friends in High Places" (Publications International, 1996) (as DiCicco Digital Arts) (illustrator)
- Disney's Hunchback of Notre Dame "Topsy Turvy" (Publications International, 1996) (as DiCicco Digital Arts) (illustrator)
- Disney's Toy Story "Buzz and the Squeak Toy" (Publications International, 1996) (as DiCicco Digital Arts) (illustrator)
- Disney's Toy Story "Woody and the New Toy" (Publications International, 1996) (as DiCicco Digital Arts) (illustrator)
- Disney's 101 Dalmatians Meet the Puppies (Walt Disney Records, 1996) (as DiCicco Digital Arts) (illustrator)
- Disney's 101 Dalmatians "Puppies Count 1-101" (Publications International, 1996) (as DiCicco Digital Arts) (illustrator)
- Disney's Hunchback of Notre Dame "Music of the Bells" (Publications International, 1996) (as DiCicco Digital Arts) (illustrator)
- Disney's Hunchback of Notre Dame (Publications International, 1996) (as DiCicco Digital Arts)
- Disney's 101 Dalmatians Sing-a-long (Walt Disney Records, 1996) (as DiCicco Digital Arts) (illustrator)
- Walt Disney's "Let's Go to the Vet" (Golden Books Publishing, 1997) (as DiCicco Digital Arts) (illustrator)
- Walt Disney's "Let's Go to the Airport" (Golden Books Publishing, 1997) (as DiCicco Digital Arts) (illustrator)
- Walt Disney's Sleeping Beauty (Golden Books Publishing, 1997) (illustrator)
- Walt Disney's "Let's Go to the Dairy Farm" (Golden Books Publishing, 1997) (as DiCicco Digital Arts) (illustrator)
- Disney's Hercules "Feel the Pain, Pat the Panic" (Mouse Works, 1997) (as DiCicco Digital Arts) (illustrator)
- A Walk in the Woods (Mouse Works, 1997) (as DiCicco Digital Arts) (paints only)
- One Colorful Picnic (Mouse Works, 1997) (as DiCicco Digital Arts) (illustrator)
- A Walk in the Woods (Mouse Works, 1997) (as DiCicco Digital Arts) (illustrator)
- Good Friends (Mouse Works, 1997) (as DiCicco Digital Arts) (illustrator)
- Who Hid the Honey? (Mouse Works, 1997) (as DiCicco Digital Arts) (illustrator)
- Getting Dressed Songs (Publications International, 1997) (as DiCicco Digital Arts) (illustrator)
- Thomas the Tank Engine "A Noisy Surprise" (Publications International, 1998) (as DiCicco Digital Arts) (illustrator)
- Goofy Gifts Galore (Mouse Works, 1998) (as DiCicco Digital Arts) (illustrator)
- Hats! Hats! Hats! (Mouse Works, 1998) (as DiCicco Digital Arts) (illustrator)
- A Honey of a Day (Mouse Works, 1998) (as DiCicco Digital Arts) (illustrator)
- Happy Days (Mouse Works, 1998) (as DiCicco Digital Arts) (illustrator)
- Walt Disney's Minnie Mysteries "The Flower Prowler" (Golden Books Publishing, 1998) (as DiCicco Digital Arts) (illustrator)
- Sesame Street Let's Count (Publications International, 1998) (illustrator)
- Sesame Street Hide and Seek, Near and Far (Publications International, 1998) (as DiCicco Digital Arts) (illustrator)
- Star Wars Episode 1 (Publications International, 1999) (as DiCicco Digital Arts) (illustrator)
- Disney/Pixar Toy Story 2 (Publications International) (as DiCicco Digital Arts) (illustrator)
- Sesame Street Elmo Makes Music (Publications International, 1999) (as DiCicco Digital Arts) (illustrator)
- Blue's Clues (Publications International, 1999) (as DiCicco Digital Arts) (illustrator)
- Dragon Tales Whole Lott' Maracas Goin' On (Reader's Digest) (illustrator)
- Jim Henson's Bear in the Big Blue House "Taking Care of Snowbear" (Reader's Digest, 2000) (illustrator)
- Jim Henson's Bear in the Big Blue House "Where is Tutter's Cheese?" (Reader's Digest, 2000) (illustrator)
- Pajama Sam The Magic Hat Tree (Lyric Publishing, 2000) (illustrator)
- Sesame Street "Elmo's ABC" (Publications International, 2000) (illustrator)
- Sesame Street "Big Bird's Big Surprise" (Reader's Digest, 2000) (illustrator)
- Walt Disney "The Tigger Movie" (Publications International, 2000) (as DiCicco Digital Arts) (illustrator)
- Sesame Street "Hello, It's Elmo" (Publications International, 2000) (illustrator)
- Sesame Street "Elmo Sing Along Songs" (Publications International, 2000) (illustrator)
- Sesame Street "Elmo's Animal Adventures" (Reader's Digest, 2000) (illustrator)
- Dragon Tales 10 Enchanting Stories (Publications International, 2001) (illustrator)
- Dragon Tales Which Way Wheezie? (Publications International, 2001) (illustrator)
- Dragon Tales The Great White Cloud Whale (Reader's Digest, 2001) (illustrator)
- Dragon Tales Zak and the Beanstalk (Reader's Digest, 2001) (illustrator)
- Dragon Tales A Tall Tale (Reader's Digest) (illustrator)
- Dragon Tales "Magical Dragon Land" (Random House, 2001) (illustrator)
- Disney's Atlantis the Lost Empire" (Publications International, 2001) (with Andrew Phillipson) (illustrator)
- Sesame Street "Elmo's Christmas Songs" (Publications International, 2001) (illustrator)
- Sesame Street "Goodnight, Elmo!" (Publications International, 2001) (illustrator)
- Sesame Street "Elmo's Rainbow" (Publications International) (illustrator)
- Cartoon Network Powerpuff Girls Telephone Book" (Publications International, 2002) (as DiCicco Digital Arts) (illustrator)
- Disney's Winnie the Pooh Thinking Games (Publications International, 2002) (as DiCicco Studios) (illustrator)
- Disney's Winnie the Pooh A Good Day for Ducklings (Publications International, 2002) (as DiCicco Studios) (illustrator)
- Dragon Tales "Good Morning, Kiki" (Random House, 2002) (illustrator)
- Dragon Tales "Knock-Knock Knuckerhole" (Random House, 2002) (as DiCicco Studios) (illustrator)
- Dragon Tales "Good Night Finn" (Random House, 2002) (illustrator)
- Disney "Eeyore's Spring Day" (Reader's Digest, 2003) (as DiCicco Studios) (illustrator)
- Disney "Pooh's Birthday Book" (Reader's Digest, 2003) (as DiCicco Studios) (illustrator)
- Disney "Pooh Tells Time" (Reader's Digest, 2003) (as DiCicco Studios) (illustrator)
- Disney Winnie the Pooh Sweet Dreams (Publications International, 2003) (as DiCicco Studios) (illustrator)
- Disney Winnie the Pooh Tigger's Bouncy Busy Box (Publications International, 2003) (as DiCicco Studios) (illustrator)
- Sesame Street "Elmo Pops In" (Publications International, 2003) (as DiCicco Studios) (illustrator)
- Disney's Winnie the Pooh "Pooh's Snapshot Surprise" (Publications International) (as DiCicco Studios) (illustrator)
- Sesame Street "Elmo's Play Day" (Publications International, 2003) (as DiCicco Studios) (illustrator)
- Sesame Street Elmo and Zoe Book of Opposites (Publications International, 2003) (as DiCicco Studios) (illustrator)
- Sesame Street Elmo's Jumpin' Jukebox (Publications International, 2003) (as DiCicco Studios) (illustrator)
- Disney Winnie the Pooh "Sweet Dreams" (Publications International, 2003) (as DiCicco Studios) (illustrator)
- Disney "Easter Bonnet Parade" (Reader's Digest, 2003) (as DiCicco Studios) (illustrator)
- Where is Mother? (North-South Books, 2003) (as DiCicco Studios) (illustrator)
- Just Like Father! (North-South Books, 2003) (as DiCicco Studios) (illustrator)
- I Found You! (North-South Books, 2003) (as DiCicco Studios) (illustrator)
- Mother May I? (North-South Books, 2003) (as DiCicco Studios) (illustrator)
- Disney "Winnie the Pooh's March March" (Reader's Digest, 2003) (as DiCicco Studios) (illustrator)
- Disney "Piglet's Winter Day" (Reader's Digest, 2004) (as DiCicco Studios) (illustrator)
- Disney's "My First Sing-Along" (Walt Disney Records, 2004) (illustrator)
- Sesame Street Elmo and Friends (Publications International, 2004) (as DiCicco Studios) (illustrator)
- Disney Pooh's Playful Songs (Publications International, 2004) (as DiCicco Studios) (illustrator)
- Sesame Street What Can Elmo Count? (Publications International, 2004) (as DiCicco Studios) (illustrator)
- Disney Pooh's Playful Songs? (Publications International, 2004) (as DiCicco Studios) (illustrator)
- Sesame Street Elmo in Dreamland (Publications International, 2004) (as DiCicco Studios) (illustrator)
- Disney Think and Play (Publications International, 2005) (as DiCicco Studios) (illustrator)
- Disney "The Days of the Week" (Reader's Digest, 2005) (as DiCicco Studios) (illustrator)
- Disney "Pooh Picks a Costume" (Reader's Digest, 2005) (as DiCicco Studios) (illustrator)
- Disney's Pocahontas Percy and Meeko (Publications International, 2005) (as DiCicco Digital Arts with Chris Buck) (illustrator)
- Disney "Rabbit's Summer Swim" (Reader's Digest, 2005) (as DiCicco Studios) (illustrator)
- Disney "Father's Day Portrait" (Reader's Digest, 2005) (as DiCicco Studios) (illustrator)
- Disney "Mother's Day for Kanga" (Reader's Digest, 2005) (as DiCicco Studios) (illustrator)
- Disney "12 Months Make a Year" (Reader's Digest, 2005) (as DiCicco Studios) (illustrator)
- Disney "Easter Bonnet Parade" (Reader's Digest, 2005) (as DiCicco Studios) (illustrator)
- Disney "Follow the Shooting Star" (Reader's Digest, 2005) (as DiCicco Studios) (illustrator)
- Disney "Father's Day Portrait" (Reader's Digest, 2005) (as DiCicco Studios) (illustrator)
- Disney "The Fourth of July" (Reader's Digest, 2005) (as DiCicco Studios) (illustrator)
- Disney's Pocahontas Meeko's New Friend (Publications International, 2005) (as DiCicco Digital Arts with Chris Buck) (illustrator)
- Disney "Winnie the Pooh Surprise Sing-Along" (Publications International, 2005) (illustrator)
- Sesame Street "Potty Time with Elmo" (Publications International, 2005) (illustrator)
- Disney/Pixar Finding Nemo Bubble Hunt (Publications International) (illustrator)
- Disney/Pixar Finding Nemo Hide and Seek (Publications International, 2006) (illustrator)
- Sesame Street Hello, Elmo! (Publications International, 2006) (illustrator)
- Dragon Tales Music is Magic (Paradise Press 2006) (illustrator)
- Dragon Tales I Wish! (Paradise Press 2006) (illustrator)
- Disney ABCs All Around (Publications International, 2007) (illustrator)
- Disney/Pixar Friends and Heroes (Publications International, 2007) (as DiCicco Studios) (illustrator)
- The Little Little Chiyos' Big Big Job (Americhip Books, 2007) (illustrator)
- Sesame Street "Prince Elmo and the Pea" (Publications International, 2007) (illustrator)
- Disney "Mickey Mouse Clubhouse" (Publications International, 2008) (illustrator)
- Disney "Mickey's Piano Party" (Publications International, 2009) (illustrator)
- Disney "Pooh's Playful Songs" (Publications International) (illustrator)
- Hop! (Americhip Books, 2009) (illustrator)
- Boo! (Americhip Books, 2009) (author/illustrator)
- Who's Home? (Americhip Books, 2009) (author/illustrator)
- Jungle in My Bedroom (Americhip Books, 2009) (illustrator)
- What Makes Baby Happy? (Americhip Books, 2009) (illustrator)
- Finally, Big Enough! (Americhip Books, 2009) (illustrator)
- Disney Little Mermaid Big Golden Book (Random House, 2010) (illustrator)
- Disney Mickey Mouse Clubhouse (Publications International, 2011) (illustrator)
- Disney Pixar Toy Story (Publications International, 2011) (illustrator)
- Disney Princess Magic (Publications International, 2011) (illustrator)
- You Are My Work of Art (Running Press, 2011) (author/illustrator)
- Superhero Potty Time (Random House, 2011) (author/illustrator)
- Princess Potty Time (Random House, 2011) (author/illustrator)
- 1, 2, 3 in the Sea (Scholastic, 2012) (author/illustrator)
- 1, 2 at the Zoo (Scholastic, 2012) (author/illustrator)
- Little Golden Book "Purple Monkey Rescue" (Random House, 2012) (illustrator)
- Totally Monster "Manners" (Silver Dolphin, 2013) (author/illustrator)
- Totally Monster "Best Friends" (Silver Dolphin, 2013) (author/illustrator)
- Totally Monster "Feelings" (Silver Dolphin, 2013) (author/illustrator)
- Elves ABC (Silver Dolphin, 2013) (author/illustrator)
- Jim Henson "Cowabella and the Bad Dream" (Running Press Kids, 2013) (illustrator)
- Jim Henson "Sweet Pea Sue Misses Mom and Dad" (Running Press Kids, 2013) (illustrator)
- Nickelodeon "Bubble Guppies "Guess Who" (Studio Fun International, 2014) (illustrator)
- Disney "Minnie Mouse Hugs for Friends" (Studio Fun International, 2014) (illustrator)
- Funny Bunnies Morning, Noon, and Night (Scholastic, 2014) (author/illustrator)
- Poky Little Puppy Step into Reading (Random House, 2015) (illustrator)
- Shy Little Kitten Step into Reading (Random House, 2015) (illustrator)
- Disney "Bath Time with Ariel" (Random House, 2015) (illustrator)
- Disney "Sleepy Time with Aurora" (Random House, 2015) (illustrator)
- Disney "Treasure's Day at Sea" (Random House, 2015) (illustrator)
- Disney "Teacup to the Rescue!" (Random House, 2015) (illustrator)
- Disney "Quiet Time with Belle" (Random House, 2015) (illustrator)
- Disney "Tidy Up Time with Cinderella" (Random House, 2015) (illustrator)
- Disney "Berry's Sweet Surprise" (Random House, 2016) (illustrator)
- Tootle Step into Reading (Random House, 2016) (illustrator)
- Tawny Scrawny Lion Step into Reading (Random House, 2016) (illustrator)
- The Poky Little Puppy's Playtime (Random House, 2016) (illustrator)
- Scuffy the Tugboat Step into Reading (Random House, 2017) (illustrator)
- Adventures in Asian Art: An Afternoon at the Museum (Tuttle Publishing, 2017) (author/illustrator)
- The Poky Little Puppy's Wonderful Winter Day (Random House, 2017) (illustrator)
- Origami Peace Cranes: Friendships Take Flight (Tuttle Publishing, 2017) (author/illustrator)
- The Little Red Caboose Step into Reading (Random House, 2018) (illustrator)
- The Shy Little Kitten's Christmas Step into Reading (Random House, 2018) (illustrator)
- The Poky Little Puppy and the Pumpkin Patch Little Golden Book (Random House, 2018) (illustrator)
- Jack and Jill and T-Ball Bill Step into Reading(Random House, 2018) (illustrator)
- The Shy Little Kitten's New Friends(Random House, 2019) (illustrator)
- The Complete Story of Sadako Sasaki(Tuttle Publishing, 2020) (co-author, illustrator)
