= Floyd Schmoe =

Floyd W. Schmoe
- Born: September 21, 1895; Prairie Center, Kansas, US
- Died: April 20, 2001 (aged 105); Kenmore, Washington, US
- Occupations: Pacifist, author
- Spouses: Ruth Pickering (m. 1919) Tomiko Yamazaki (m. 1970)
- Children: Kenneth, Helen, Esther, Wilfred, Ruthanna
- Parent(s): Ernest and Minta Schmoe

Floyd Wilfred Schmoe (September 21, 1895 – April 20, 2001) was a Quaker, pacifist, author, college professor, marine biologist, and park ranger living in the Seattle, Washington, area for most of his life. He earned Japan's highest civilian honor for his peace activism and was nominated for the Nobel Peace Prize three times.

== Early life ==
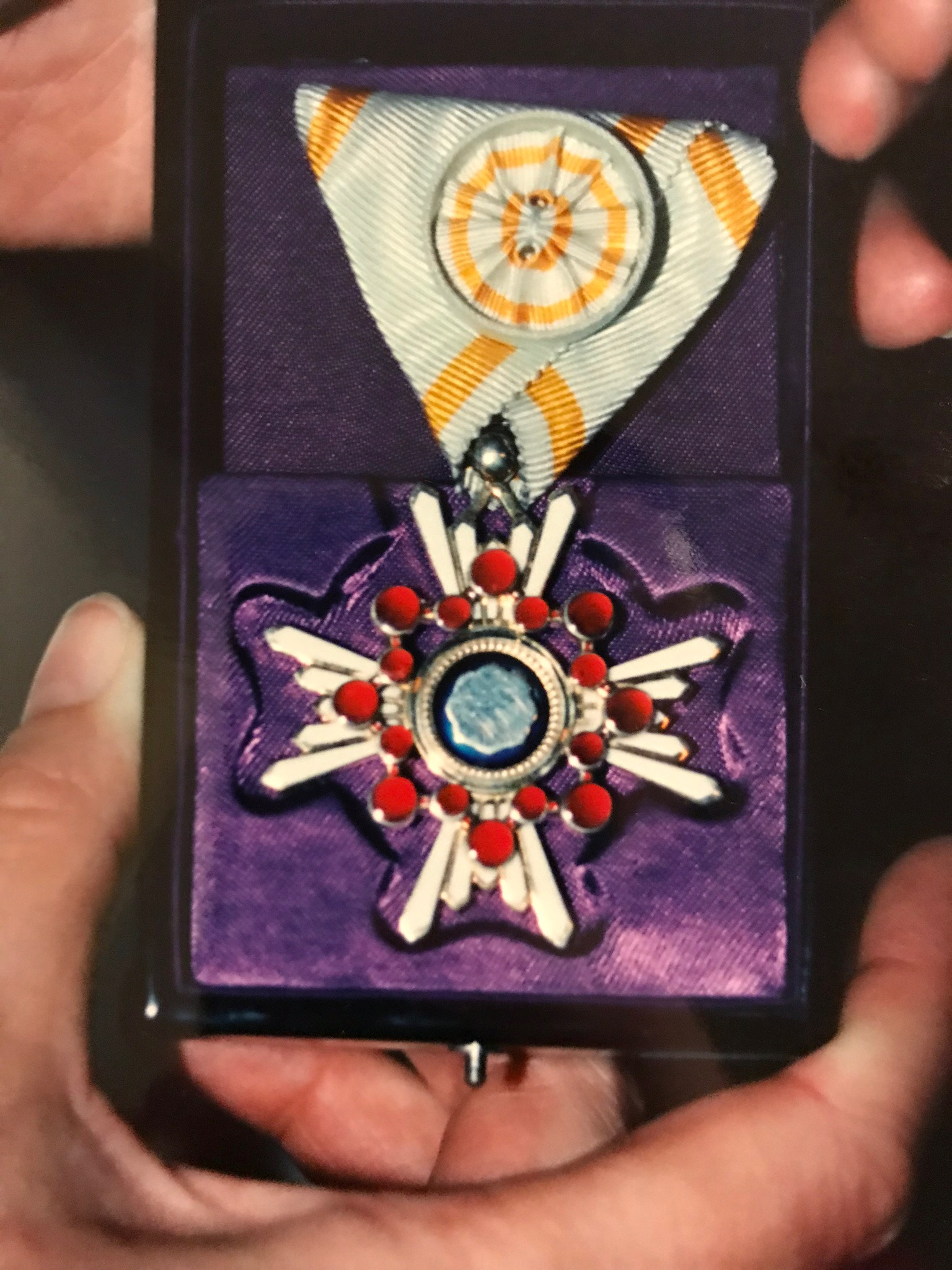
Japan's "Order of the Sacred Treasure" (4th Class) awarded to Floyd Schmoe in 1982, for his work building homes in Hiroshima after WWII.

Floyd was the second of five children of Ernest and Minta Schmoe. The family lived on a farm in Johnson County, Kansas, near Prairie Center. His family belonged to the Religious Society of Friends, or the Quakers, from which he gained his commitment to non-violence. The family farm also gave him a profound interest in nature.

In 1916 he enrolled in Friends University in Wichita. He moved to Seattle in 1917 to pursue a degree in forestry from the University of Washington. With the likelihood of conscription to fight in World War I looming, Schmoe joined the American Friends Service Committee. He sailed to Europe in May 1918 and spent the bulk of his 14 months in Europe taking care of refugees. Perhaps the most dramatic event of his war service was his work with an ambulance unit where he carried stretchers of wounded soldiers for 30 hours during the Battle of Chateau-Thierry.

Schmoe returned from Europe in July 1919 and returned to his forestry studies at the University of Washington. He ran out of money, and left school to become the winter caretaker of the Paradise Inn at Mount Rainier National Park in 1920. This began a seven-year career with the National Park Service. He worked as a mountain guide during the summers of 1920 and 1921, while continuing his studies at the University of Washington. He transferred to the New York School of Forestry and graduated in 1922. He returned to Mount Rainier and became a Park Ranger on June 20, 1922. In 1924 he was named the Park's first Naturalist. He lectured extensively on the park and its natural history all over the country.

With his growing family, Schmoe moved out of Mount Rainier National Park in 1928 to take a position with the University of Washington in Seattle as the Director of the Puget Sound Academy of Science. While at the university he embarked on graduate study in marine biology, earning a master's degree in 1937. He was an instructor in forestry at the University of Washington from 1935 to 1942.

== Peace Activism ==
As World War II loomed on the horizon, Schmoe began a career of public peace activism. On the University of Washington campus he opposed conscription. Working with the American Friends Service Committee, he assisted refugees fleeing the war in Europe.

He left the University of Washington in 1942 to head a regional office of the American Friends Service Committee in Seattle. Much of his work was devoted to helping Japanese-Americans who were facing removal under Executive Order 9066. He sought to help University of Washington Students transfer to other schools where they could continue their education. He looked after homes and other property Japanese-American families were forced to leave behind when they were removed, and visited the camps where they were sequestered. The removal of Japanese-Americans became more deeply personal when Ester Schmoe, Floyd's daughter, married Gordon Hirabayashi, who fought the removal order all the way to the Supreme Court. Although he lost his case at the time, Hirabayashi was posthumously awarded the Presidential Medal of Freedom for his stand against removal. After the Japanese-Americans were released, Floyd helped them repair their homes and restart their businesses.

After World War II he went to Hiroshima and Nagasaki, Japan, and built houses to replace those destroyed by the atomic bomb. He described the program as "adventures in good will". He built approximately 40 residential buildings, some single family and some multi-family, from 1949 to 1953 using funds and volunteers from the US. During his "Houses For Hiroshima" project, he exchanged letters with Emperor Hirohito and screened his presentation on Mount Rainier for the future Emperor Akihito. In 2012, the sole remaining house was re-opened as a museum, with his then-85-year-old son Wilfred P. Schmoe attending along with Hiroshima mayor Kazumi Matsui. Floyd Schmoe was awarded the Order of the Sacred Treasure (4th Class) in 1982 for his efforts in Japan. That same year he received the Hiroshima Peace Prize and was made an honorary citizen of Japan.

In 1953, after the Korean War, Schmoe was sent to South Korea under the auspices of the United Nations Korean Reconstruction Agency to examine humanitarian needs in the war-torn country. He founded "Houses for Korea" to rebuild residential structures, roads, bridges, and wells, and lectured all over the United States to raise money, just as he did for "Houses for Hiroshima".

At the urging of Gordon and Ester Hirabayashi, who were at the American University in Cairo at the time, Schmoe also worked on helping refugees from the 1956 Sinai War. After this effort he retired from full-time peace activism and spent more time writing.

== Later life ==
His writing on nature, particularly A Year in Paradise, published in 1958, For the Love of Some Islands, published in 1964, and The Big Sur, published in 1975, was well received.

Although retired from full-time activism, Schmoe continued to work for peace in his later life. He spoke out against the war in Vietnam in 1966. He marched on the United Nations for nuclear disarmament in 1982. He assisted in the establishment of the Seattle-Tashkent Peace Park in 1988. In 1990, he was the prime mover behind the Seattle Peace Park, using his prize money from the Hiroshima Peace Prize for funding.

Floyd Schmoe was nominated three times for the Nobel Peace Prize by U.S. Representative Jim McDermott.

== Family ==
Floyd became engaged to Ruth Pickering of Wichita, Kansas in 1916. They were both students at Friends University at the time. They were married August 17, 1919 after Floyd returned from World War I. Their first child, Kenneth, was born September 28, 1920. Their second child, Helen Elizabeth, was born and died in 1923. Their third child, Esther Roberta, was born in 1924. Their fourth child, Wilfred P., was born in 1927. Their fifth child, Ruthanna, was born in 1934.

Ruth Schmoe died on March 15, 1969. Floyd married Tomiko Yamazaki, who he met as a volunteer for the "Houses for Hiroshima" project, in 1970.

== Bibliography ==
- Schmoe, Floyd (1925). Mount Rainier National Park – The Unofficial Guide Book.
- Schmoe, Floyd (1925). Our Greatest Mountain. G. P. Putnam's Sons. p. 366 pages.
- Clarke Crichton, Jr.; ghost written by Floyd (1930). Frozen In. G. P. Putnam's Sons. p. 148 pages.
- Schmoe, Floyd (1933). Wilderness Tales. University of Washington Press. p. 117 pages.
- Schmoe, Floyd (1934). Cattails and Pussywillows. Lake City Press. p. 104 pages.
- Schmoe, Floyd (1950). Japan Journey. Silver Quoin Press.
- Schmoe, Floyd (1959). A Year in Paradise. The Mountaineers Books. p. 208 pages. ISBN 0-89886-653-7.
- Schmoe, Floyd (1962). What is Man. Voyager Press.
- Schmoe, Floyd (1964). For the Love of Some Islands. Harper & Row. p. 226 pages.
- Schmoe, Floyd (1975). The Big Sur. Chronicle Books. ISBN 0-87701-070-6.
- Schmoe, Floyd (1979). The Years of My Day. published 2023. Azzurri Publishing.
- Schmoe, Floyd (1980). Spoon Creek.
- Schmoe, Floyd (1983). Why is Man. CE Publishing. p. 21 pages. ISBN 1-878906-32-1.
- Schmoe, Floyd (1989). The Years of My Day II.
- Schmoe, Floyd. From Walking To and Fro Upon The Earth.
- Schmoe, Floyd (1996). Dove.
