= One thousand origami cranes =

Mythology of Japan

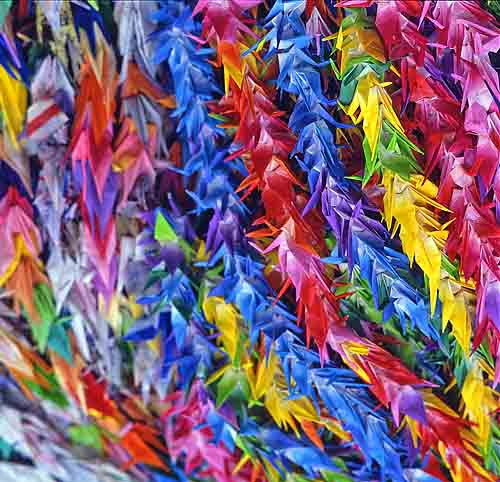
Origami cranes

The folding of one thousand origami cranes (千羽鶴, senbazuru; lit. 'one thousand cranes') is a Japanese precatory tradition derived from ancient folklore. In Japan, the crane is considered mystical or holy, and historically, paper cranes were offered to shrines and temples by those who sought blessings. The advent of origami allowed the tradition to spread beyond votive offerings to become a broader phenomenon, which grew into the creation of one-thousand origami cranes - one for each year the animal was said to have lived.

In the modern era, the tradition was revived and subsequently popularized by Sadako Sasaki, a child survivor of the atomic bombing of Hiroshima who attempted the senbazuru before dying of leukemia.

== Cultural significance ==
In Japan, cranes have been thought a symbol of long life. An old phrase says "cranes live a thousand years". Here "a thousand" is not necessarily to designate the exact number, but a poetic expression of huge amounts. Historically well-wishers offered a picture of a crane to shrines and temples as well as paper cranes. Origami, specially crafted and patterned paper, was invented in the Edo period. In the late 17th century, books referring not only to "paper cranes" but also to "one thousand cranes" were published.

In modern times, cranes are often given to a person who is seriously ill, to wish for their recovery. They are usually created by friends, classmates, or colleagues as a collective effort, offered to a shrine on the person's behalf or directly gifted to the person. Another common use is for sports teams or athletes, wishing them victories. Cranes are often seen at war memorials, symbolically representing wishes for both good health and peace.

Several temples, including some in Tokyo and Hiroshima, have eternal flames for world peace. At these temples, school groups or individuals often donate senbazuru to add to the prayer for peace. The cranes are left exposed to the elements, slowly becoming tattered and dissolving as symbolically, the wish is released. In this way, they are related to the prayer flags of India and Tibet.

The Japanese space agency JAXA used the folding of one thousand cranes as one of the tests for candidates of its astronaut program.

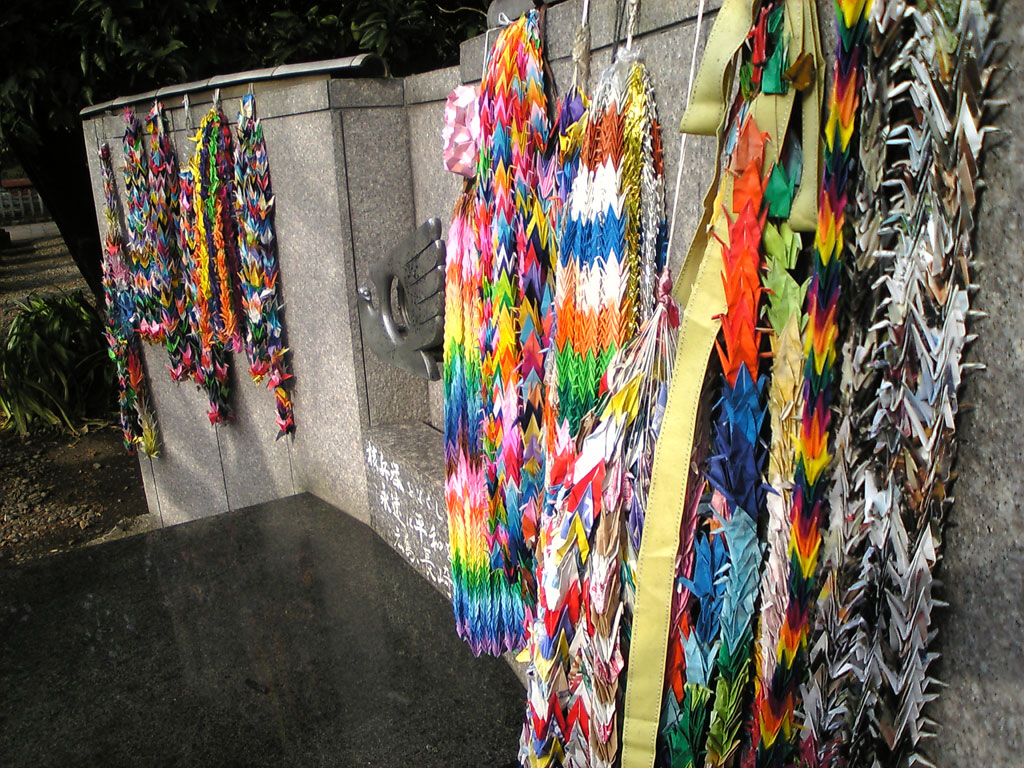
Eternal flame of peace, with cranes, in Ueno Tōshō-gū shrine, Tokyo, Japan.

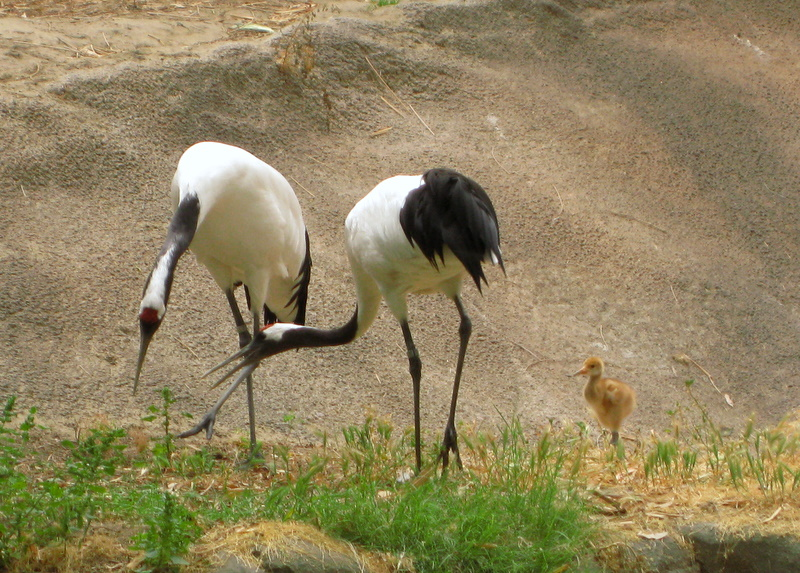
The Japanese crane (丹頂)

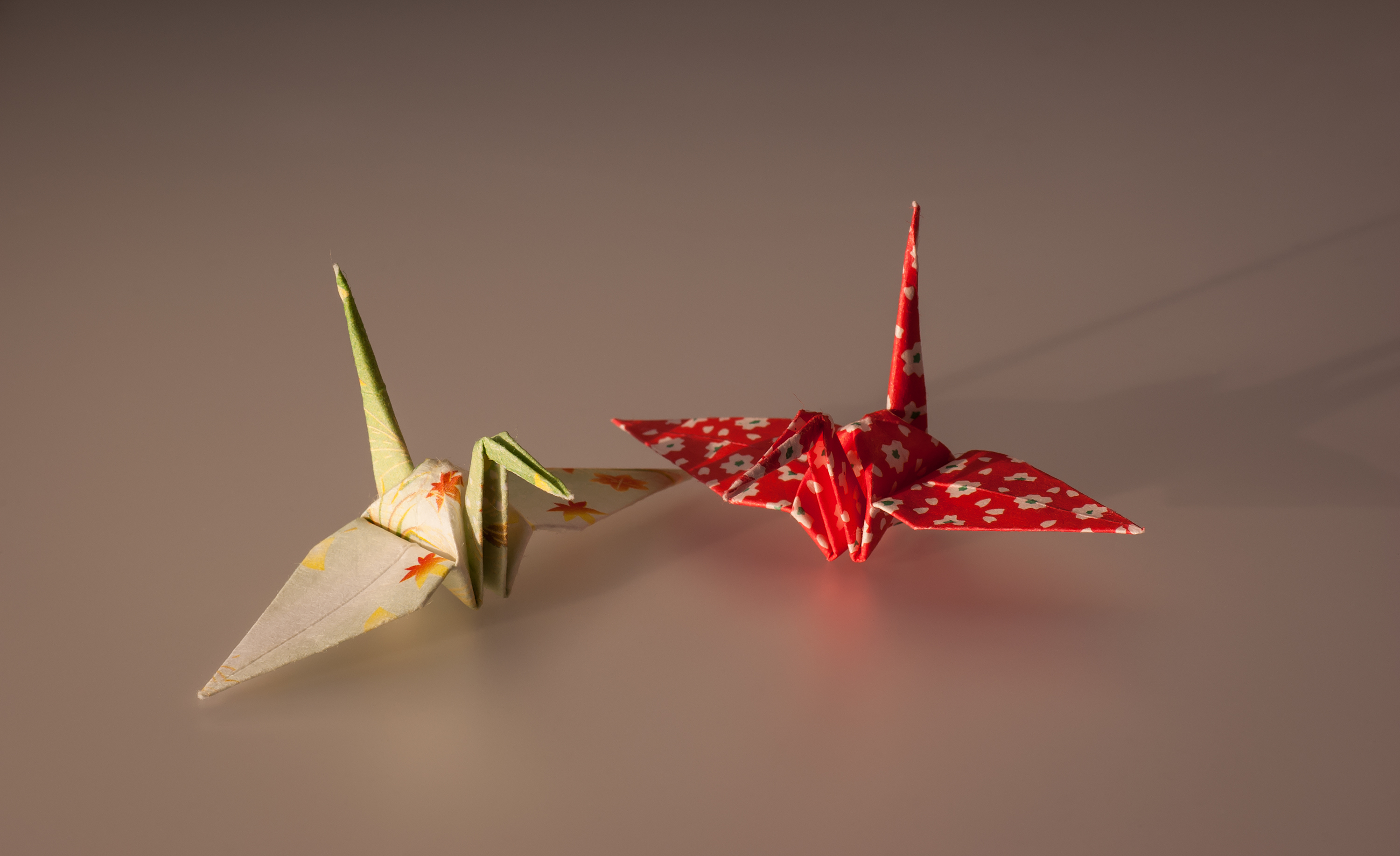
Traditional Japanese origami cranes

=== Sadako Sasaki ===
The one thousand origami cranes were globally popularized through the story of Sadako Sasaki, a Japanese girl who was two years old when she was exposed to radiation from the atomic bombing of Hiroshima during World War II. Sasaki soon developed leukemia and, at age 12 after spending a significant amount of time in a hospital, began making origami cranes with the goal of making one thousand, inspired by the senbazuru legend. In a fictionalized version of the story as told in the book Sadako and the Thousand Paper Cranes, she folded only 644 before she became too weak to fold anymore, and died on 25 October 1955. To honor her memory, her classmates agreed to fold the remaining 356 cranes for her.

According to her family, and especially her older brother Masahiro Sasaki, who speaks on his sister's life at events, Sadako not only exceeded 644 cranes, she exceeded her goal of 1,000 and died having folded approximately 1,400 paper cranes. In his book, The Complete Story of Sadako Sasaki, co-written with Sue DiCicco, founder of the Peace Crane Project, Masahiro says Sadako exceeded her goal. The Hiroshima Peace Memorial Museum states that she did complete the 1,000 cranes and continued past that when her wish failed to come true.

There is a statue of Sadako holding a crane in Hiroshima Peace Memorial Park, and every year on Obon day, people leave cranes at the statue in memory of the departed spirits of their ancestors.

== Materials ==
Sets of origami paper are sold widely in Japan, with senbazuru sets including about one thousand sheets of paper, string, and beads to place at the end of each string to stop the cranes from slipping off. Commonly, the cranes are assembled as 25 strings of 40 cranes each.

The size of the origami paper does not matter when assembling a thousand paper cranes, but smaller sheets consequently yield smaller and lighter strings of cranes. The most popular size for senbazuru is 7.5 by 7.5 centimetres (3.0 in × 3.0 in). Some people cut their own squares of paper from anything available, such as magazines, newspapers, notebooks, and printer paper.

Origami paper used for senbazuru is usually of a solid color, though patterned designs are available. Larger size origami paper, usually 6×6 inches, often has traditional Japanese or flower designs, reminiscent of kimono patterns.

== Use outside of Japanese culture ==
Tom Petersson, bass guitarist of the American rock back Cheap Trick played with a senbazuru attached to his bass for a long period in his career with Cheap Trick, first attaching it during the band's concert at the Nippon Budokan.

== See also ==
- Children's Peace Monument
- Kunihiko Kasahara (See Vol. 3 of his listed publications)
- Orizuru
