= Orizuru =

Origami of a crane (bird)

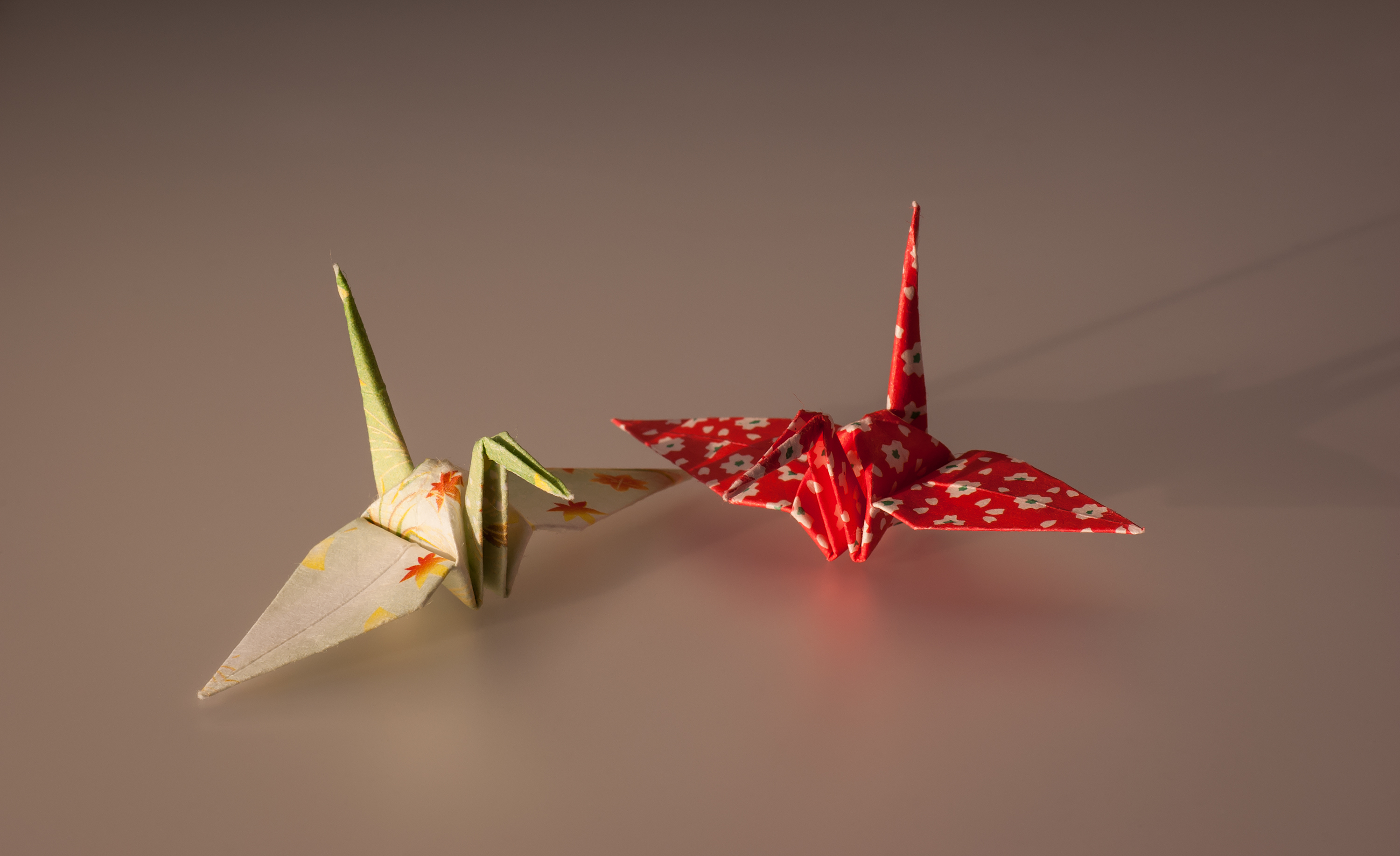
Paper cranes

A paper crane spinning in the wind.

The orizuru (折鶴 ori- "folded," tsuru "crane"), origami crane or paper crane, is a design that is considered to be the most classic of all Japanese origami. In Japanese culture, it is believed that its wings carry souls up to paradise, and it is a representation of the Japanese red-crowned crane, referred to as the "Honourable Lord Crane" in Japanese culture. It is often used as a ceremonial wrapper or restaurant table decoration. A thousand orizuru strung together is called senbazuru (千羽鶴), meaning "thousand cranes", and it is said that if someone folds a thousand cranes, they are granted one wish.

The significance of senbazuru is featured in Sadako and the Thousand Paper Cranes, a classic story based on the life of Sadako Sasaki, a hibakusha girl at Hiroshima, and then later in a book The Complete Story of Sadako Sasaki: and the Thousand Paper Cranes. Since then, senbazuru and collective effort to complete it came to be recognized as synonyms of 'wish for recovering' or 'wish for peace'. Hiroshima Peace Memorial Museum exhibits two paper cranes hand-crafted and presented to the museum by President Barack Obama when he visited the city in 2016, alongside his message.

== Renzuru ==
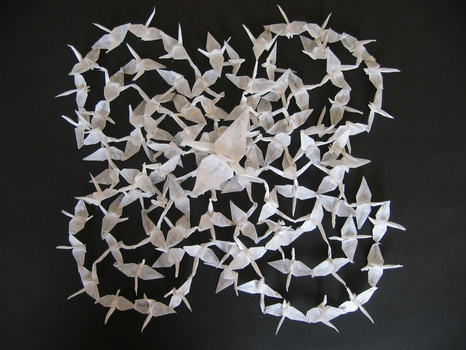
Renzuru, "HYAKKAKU (One hundred cranes)" in the Hiden Senbazuru Orikata

The term renzuru (連鶴, "conjoined cranes") refers to an origami technique whereby one folds multiple cranes from a single sheet of paper (usually square), employing a number of strategic cuts to form a mosaic of semi-detached smaller squares from the original large square paper. The resulting cranes are attached to one another (e.g., at the tips of the beaks, wings, or tails) or at the tip of the body (e.g., a baby crane sitting on its mother's back). The trick is to fold all the cranes without breaking the small paper bridges that attach them to one another or, in some cases, to effectively conceal extra paper.

Typical renzuru configurations include a circle of four or more cranes attached at the wing tips. One of the simplest forms, made from a half-square (2×1 rectangle) cut halfway through from one of the long sides, results in two cranes that share an entire wing, positioned vertically between their bodies; heads and tails may face in the same or opposite directions. This is known as imoseyama. If made from paper colored differently on each side, the cranes will be different colors.

This origami technique was first illustrated in one of the oldest known origami books, the Hiden Senbazuru Orikata (1797). (Updated diagrams from this early work can be found in a current book by Japanese origami author Kunihiko Kasahara.)

== Folding the orizuru ==
Instructions on folding the origami crane, using the Yoshizawa–Randlett system of notation.
