= Eleanor Coerr =

Canadian-American writer (1922–2010)

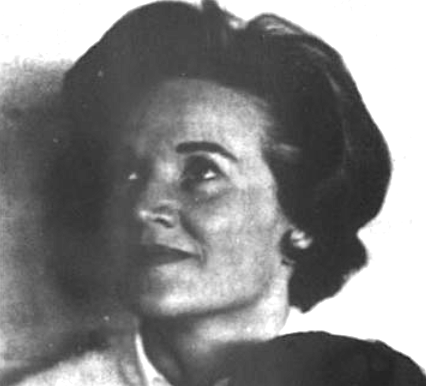
- Eleanor Coerr in 1968
- Born: Eleanor Page; May 29, 1922; Kamsack, Saskatchewan, Canada
- Died: November 22, 2010 (aged 88); New York City, U.S.
- Occupation: Writer
- Spouse(s): Wymberley DeRenne Coerr (m. 1965–1996)
- Writing career
- Period: 1945–2010
- Genres: Children's literature, picture books
- Notable work: Sadako and the Thousand Paper Cranes

Eleanor Coerr (née Page; May 29, 1922 – November 22, 2010) was a Canadian-born American writer of children's books, including Sadako and the Thousand Paper Cranes (historical fiction) and many picture books.

== Biography ==
She was born in Kamsack, Saskatchewan, Canada, and raised in Saskatoon. As a child, she liked to think up and read new stories. Through her best friend in high school, who was born to Japanese immigrants, Coerr developed an interest in calligraphy, Japanese food, and origami. She was exposed to Japanese scenery and told her friend that she wished to visit Japan one day, a request which Coerr fulfilled during the writing of Sadako and the Thousand Paper Cranes.

She attended the University of Saskatchewan, later transferring to the Kadel Airbrush School. She earned a bachelor's degree in English from American University, and a master's degree in library science from the University of Maryland. After graduation, Coerr worked as a newspaper reporter and editor of a children's column. She taught children's literature at Monterey Peninsula College and creative writing at Chapman College in California.

She was married to the by then former 1962-1965 U.S. Ambassador to Uruguay, Wymberly DeRenne Coerr (1913–1996) from 1965 until his death from Parkinson's disease in 1996. He was a career diplomat, and she travelled with him to a number of countries, including foreign posts in Japan, Taiwan, Thailand, Philippines, and Brazil. Coerr both wrote and illustrated her first book in 1945, although she did not begin to publish her work until the 1960s. Her later works included children's books, philanthropy, and giving lectures at American universities and overseas. After Wymberly's death, she became more reclusive and stayed at private residences in Pebble Beach, California, and Henderson, Nevada.

She is perhaps best known for her book Sadako and the Thousand Paper Cranes, published in 1977. It told the story of Sadako Sasaki, who was diagnosed with leukemia due to complications from the atomic bomb dropped on Hiroshima when she was two years old. She is told that folding a thousand paper cranes will make her well.

Coerr died on November 22, 2010, at the age of 88. Both she and Wymberly were cremated.

== Books ==
- The Mystery of the Golden Cat (1968)
- Twenty-five dragons (1971)
- Biography of a Giant Panda (1974)
- Biography of a Kangaroo (1976)
- Jane Goodall (1976)
- Waza Wins at Windy Gulch (1977)
- Sadako and the Thousand Paper Cranes (1977)
- The mixed-up mystery smell (1980)
- The Bell Ringer and the Pirates (1983)
- The Big Balloon Race (1984)
- Lady with a Torch: How the Statue of Liberty Was Born (1986)
- Chang's Paper Pony (1993)
- Mieko and the Fifth Treasure (1993)
- Sam the Minuteman (1995)
- Buffalo Bill and the Pony Express (1996)
- Sadako (1997)
- Prairie School (2003)
- Josefina Story Quilt (Spanish: Josefina y la colcha de retazos) (2006)
