= Karl Bruckner =

Austrian children's writer

Karl Bruckner (9 January 1906 – 25 October 1982) was an Austrian children's writer.

Committed to peace, international understanding, and social justice, he became one of Austria's leading writers for young people.

== Life ==
The son of a printer, Bruckner grew up in the Viennese suburb of Ottakring and became a motor mechanic. He began to write in 1946. He travelled widely.

== Awards ==
- the City of Vienna Children's Book Prize – 1954 for Giovanna und der Sumpf
- Austrian Children's Book Prize – 1956 for Die Strolche von Neapel
- the City of Vienna Youth Book Prize – 1957 for Der goldene Pharao
- Austrian Children's Book Prize – 1961 for Sadako will leben ('The Day of the Bomb')

== Books ==
- Giovanna und der Sumpf (1954)
- Die Strolche von Neapel (1955)
- The Golden Pharaoh (English translation, 1959)
- Viva Mexico (1962)
- The Day of the Bomb (1962) (English translation of Sadako will leben, (Sadako wants to live) (1961), published in more than 122 countries and in 22 languages )
- Nur zwei Roboter? (1963) (translated in English as Hour of the Robots by Frances Lobb, 1964 )
- Yossi und Assad (1971)
- Der Sieger (1973)
- Tuan im Feuer (1977)
- Die Spatzenelf (2000)
