= Hiroshima Witness =

- Production companies: Hiroshima Peace Cultural Center; NHK
- Release date: 1986
- Country: Japan

Hiroshima Witness, also released as Voice of Hibakusha, is a documentary film featuring 100 interviews of people who survived the atomic bombings of Hiroshima and Nagasaki, also known as hibakusha. Hiroshima Witness was produced in 1986 by the Hiroshima Peace Cultural Center and NHK, the public broadcasting company of Japan.
