= Human Shadow Etched in Stone =

Exhibition at the Hiroshima Peace Memorial Museum

- Japan
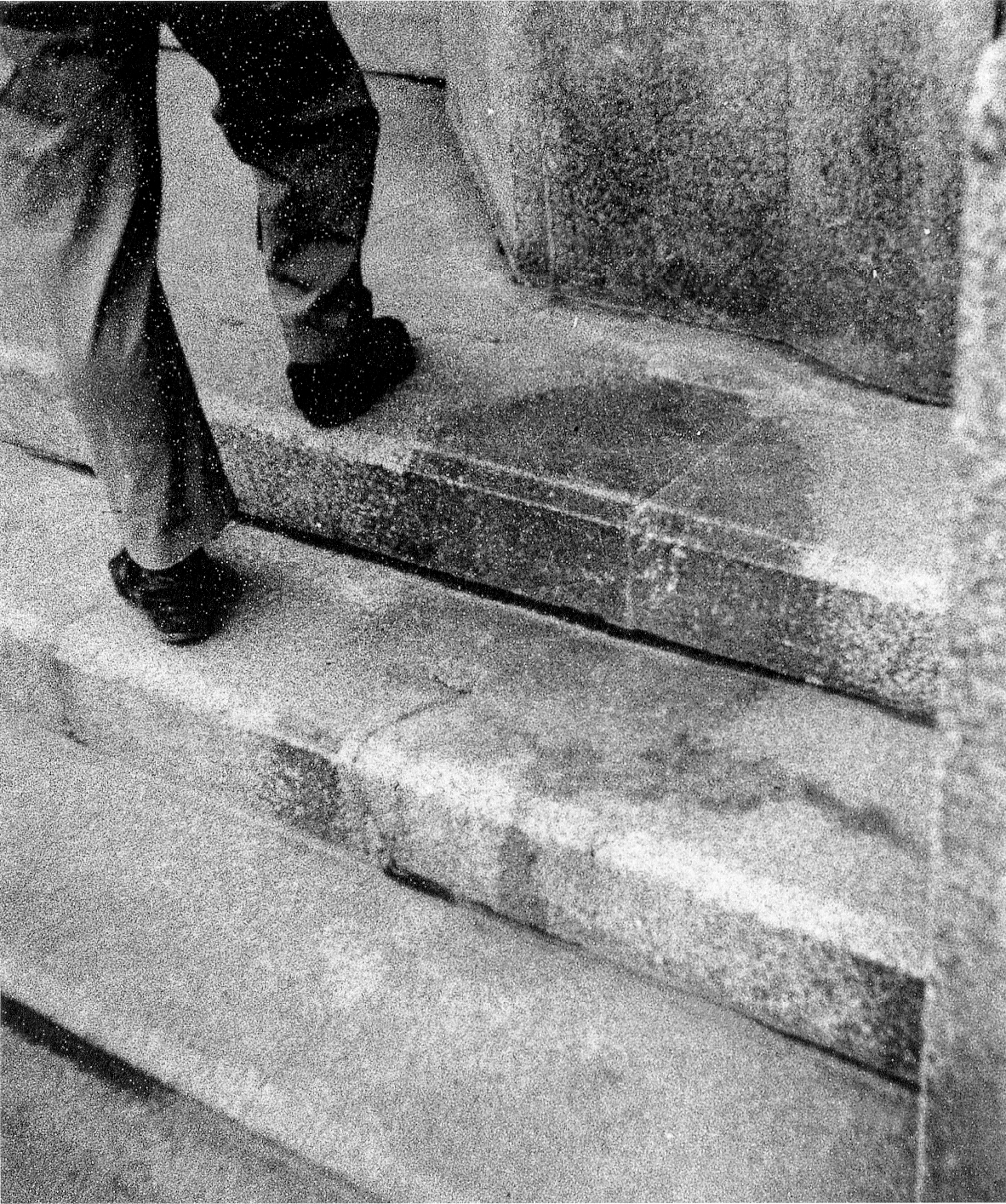
- Photograph by Yoshito Matsushige. A journalist's legs were included to provide context to the scene.
- Used for those deceased
- Location: 34°23′31″N 132°27′07″E; Japan Hiroshima Prefecture

Burials by nation
- Japan

Burials by war
- WWII

Human Shadow Etched in Stone (人影の石, hitokage no ishi) is an exhibition at the Hiroshima Peace Memorial Museum. It is thought to be the shadow of a person who was sitting at the entrance of Hiroshima Branch of Sumitomo Bank when Little Boy was detonated over the city. It is also known as Human Shadow of Death or simply the Blast Shadow.

== Background ==
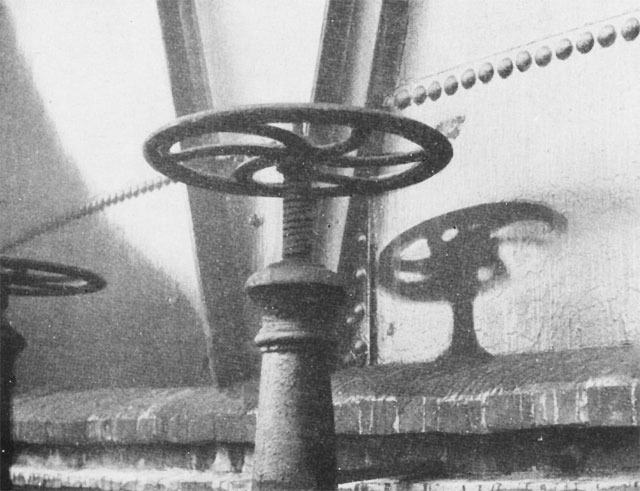
In this example of a flash burn 1.33 miles (2.14 km) from ground zero at Hiroshima, the paint on a gas holder was scorched and rendered lighter than it originally was by the thermal radiation, except for the places where the valve handle blocked the radiation, which retained the original (darker) color.

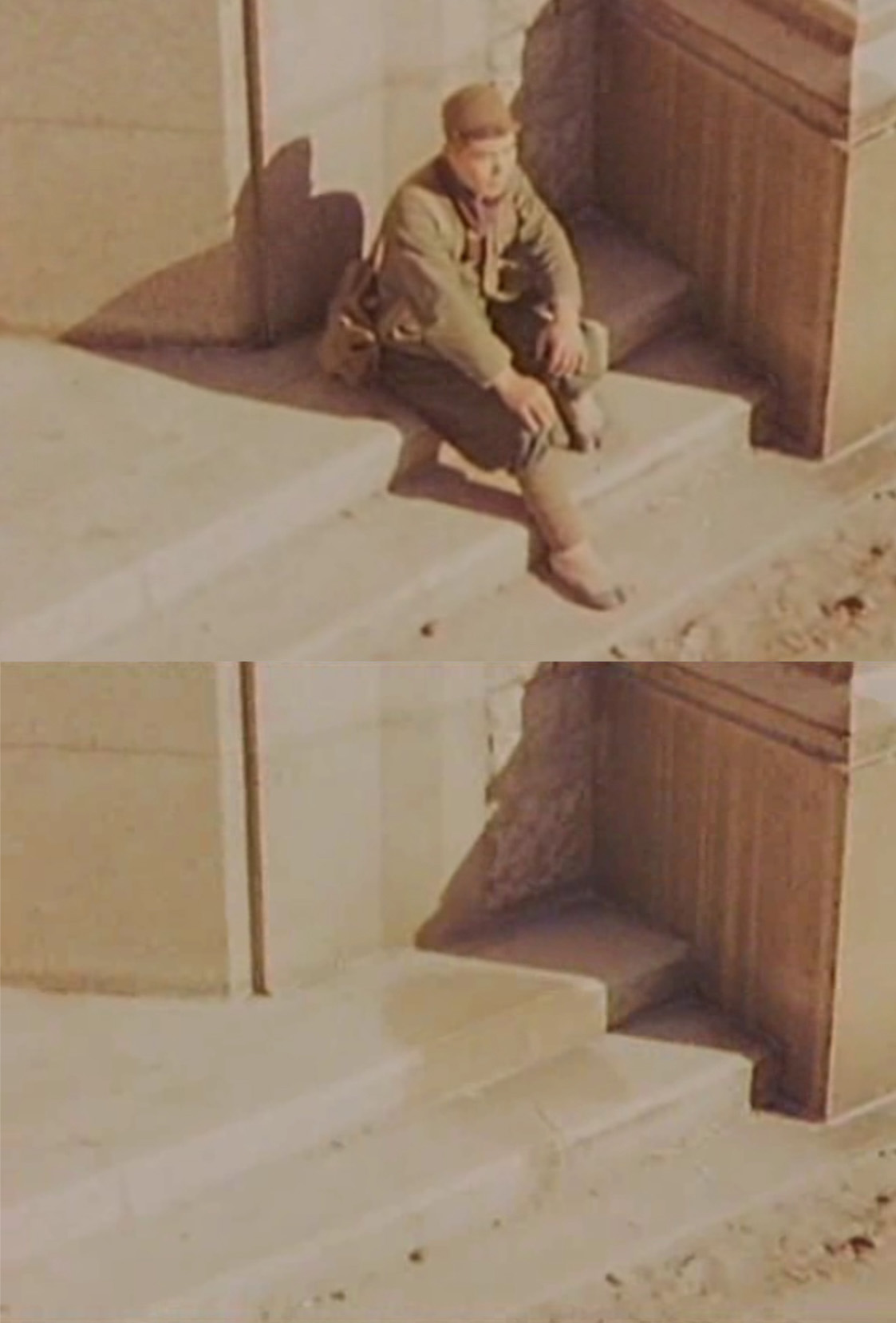
A Japanese man recreating (in 1946) the probable position that the person on the steps of the Sumitomo Bank which would have created the flash burn "shadow" when the atomic bomb detonated nearby on the morning of August 6, 1945

On the morning of August 6, 1945, the Little Boy atomic bomb was detonated at an altitude of 1,968 ± 50 feet (600 ± 15 m) over the city of Hiroshima, near the Hiroshima Prefectural Industrial Promotion Hall. Among its other effects, it subjected the ground area to extremely high radiant temperatures for several seconds (higher than 1800 °C/3270 °F for less than 4 seconds). Because the duration of this high-temperature burn was so short, it did not have time to diffuse or be dissipated by thermal diffusion. This meant that the immediate surfaces of affected objects were raised to a very high temperature while very little temperature rise occurred beneath their surfaces. After the war, investigators named this the flash burn effect. The angles of the burns, and the specific changes to the surfaces, were closely studied, as they could be used to precisely determine explosion parameters such as the exact altitude, height of burst, and size of fireball.

Throughout Hiroshima (and Nagasaki), "shadows" were found where an intervening object had shielded some part of a surface that was otherwise scorched by direct, line-of-sight heat radiation. For example, the paint on a building might ignite, except in the areas in which it was shielded. Polished stone became rough where it was exposed to the heat (which caused crystals within it to expand), while shadowed areas remained smooth. The British mission to Hiroshima and Nagasaki noted in 1946 that the surfaces of asphalt roads "retained the 'shadows' of those who had walked there at the instant of the explosion", and judged them "objects of macabre interest and pilgrimage for visitors".

The "human shadow" at the entrance of the Sumitomo Bank was approximately 260 metres (850 ft) from the hypocenter of the atomic bomb explosion at Hiroshima. It is thought that the person had been sitting on the stone step waiting for the bank to open when the heat from the bomb burned the surrounding stone white and left the person's shadow visible as a darkened area.

While the belief has persisted that it shows the remnant of a "vaporized" person, this has been shown to be scientifically impossible: the temperatures required to vaporize a human body in such a short amount of time exceed even the high temperatures experienced on the ground at Hiroshima. If the shadow is of a human being, it indicates that the person absorbed sufficient heat to not significantly burn or alter the surface of the steps they were obscuring. Rather than being vaporized or reduced to ash, the person would have had any of their clothing or skin exposed to very high temperatures, and likely have been extremely burned, as well as subjected to the blast and radiation effects.

The person who cast the shadow almost certainly died immediately in the flash of the bomb. Witnesses reported seeing a person sitting at the entrance just before the explosion, and a soldier testified he had recovered the person's body. The museum exhibit claimed the shadow belonged to a 42-year-old woman named Mitsuno Ochi (越智ミツノ, Ochi Mitsuno), but conclusive proof of this claim cannot be determined and the victim's identity remains unknown.

In January 1971, part of the stone containing the artifact (3.3 meters wide by 2 meters high) was cut from the original location and moved to the museum. As the shadow had been degraded due to weathering, in April 1975, the museum began research into preserving the shadow. In 1991, the museum reported that earnest investigation of preservation methods had commenced. At present, the stone is surrounded by glass.

== History ==
=== Hiroshima Branch of Sumitomo Bank ===
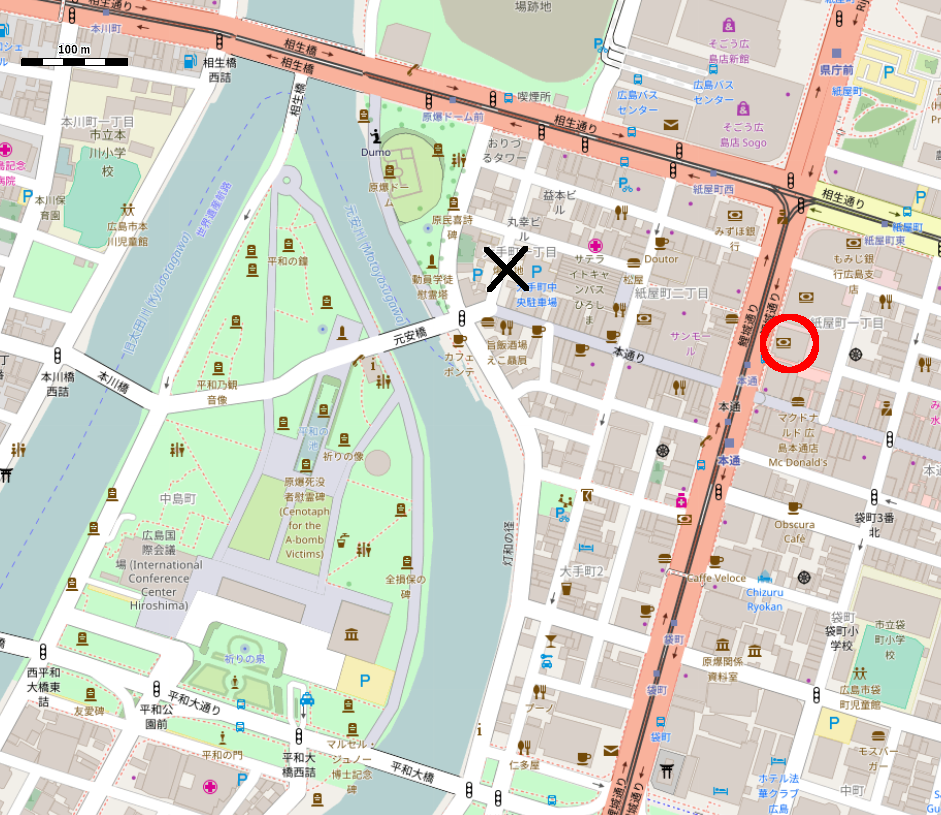
The black x-mark indicates ground zero, while the red circle is the Hiroshima Branch of Sumitomo Bank (now Sumitomo Mitsui Bank)

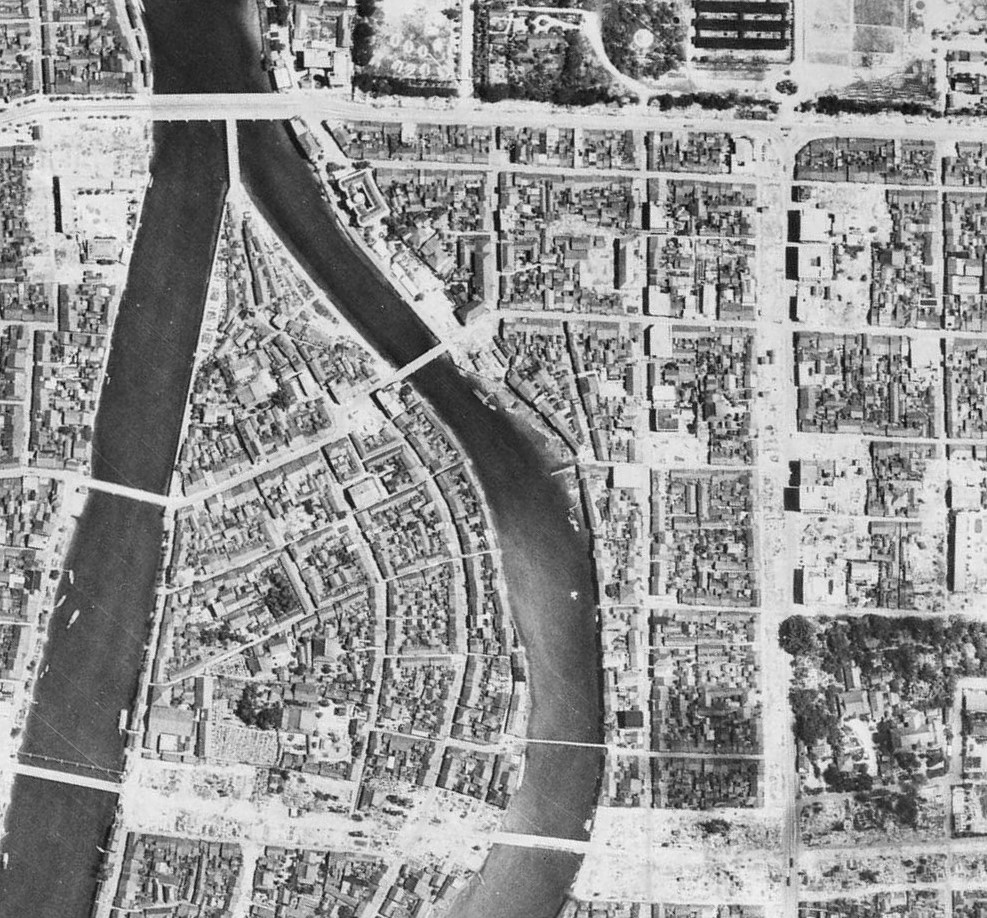
Aerial photograph on July 25, 1945, before the bombing

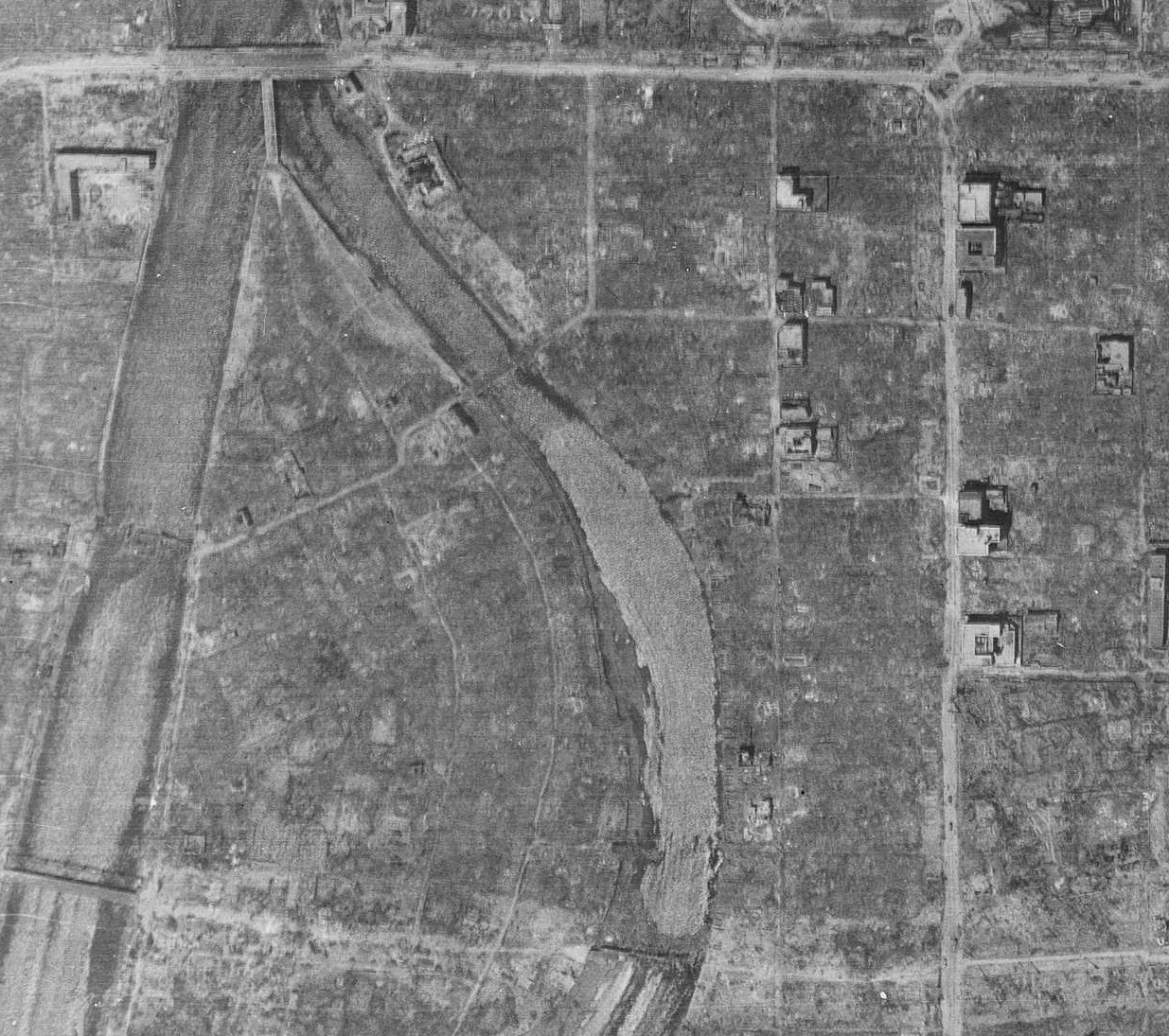
Aerial photograph on August 8, 1945, two days after the bombing

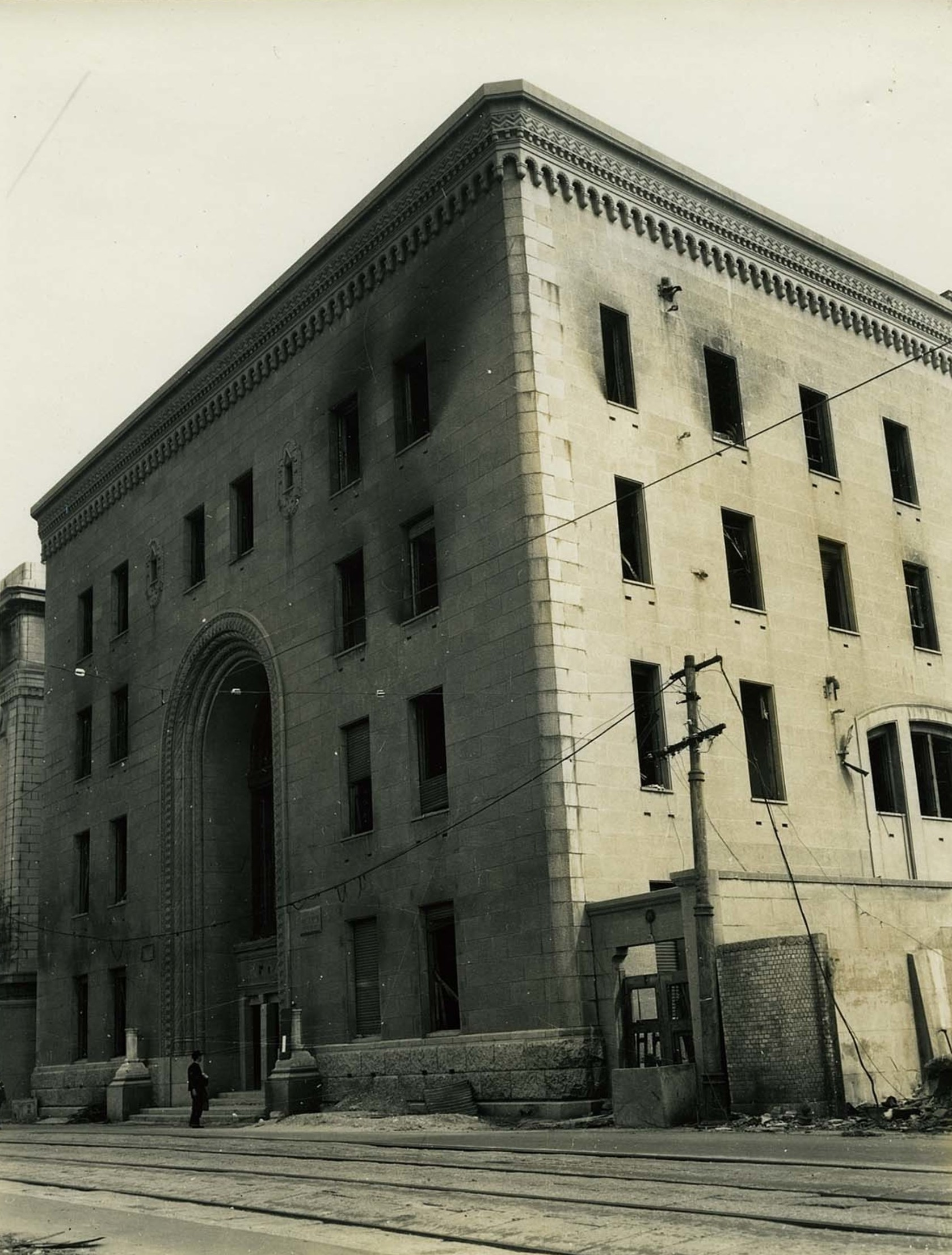
Hiroshima Branch of Sumitomo Bank after the bombing. The Human Shadow Etched in Stone was at the steps, near the person standing at the entrance.

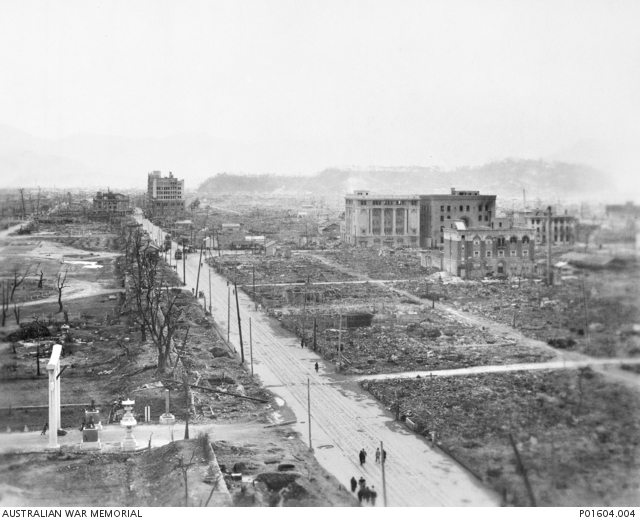
The view toward the east from Hiroshima Chamber of Commerce and Industry. The white building in the center is the main office of Geibi Bank, and the building on the right is the Hiroshima Branch of Sumitomo Bank.

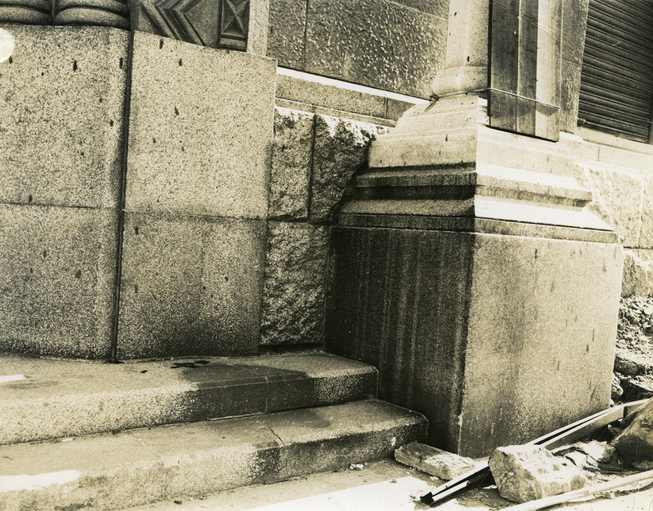
Photograph by U.S. armed forces on November 20, 1945

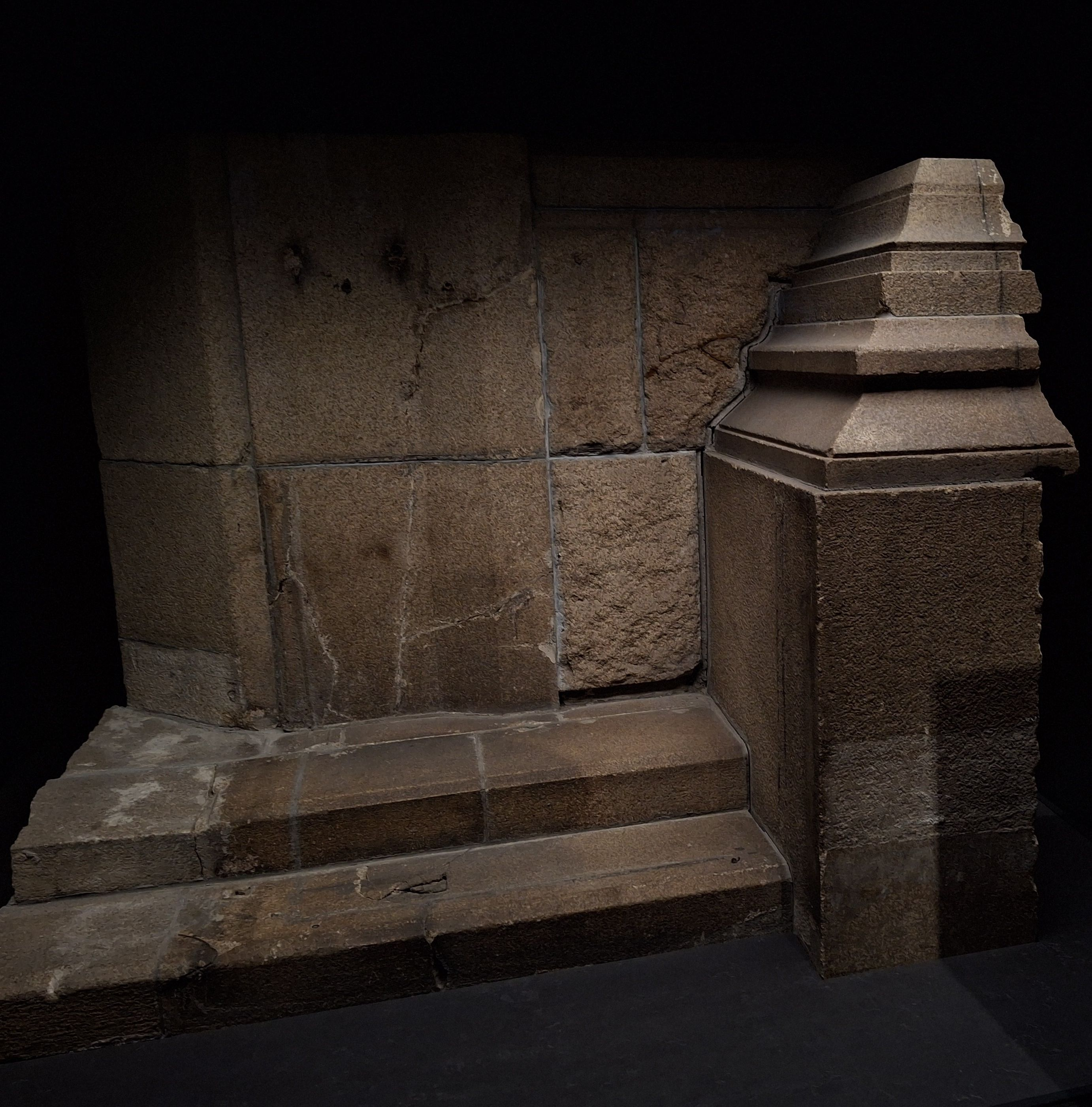
The stone in exhibition in Hiroshima Peace Museum

Human Shadow Etched in Stone was originally part of the stone steps at the entrance of the Hiroshima Branch of Sumitomo Bank, located 260 meters (850 ft) from ground zero. The current location of the Sumitomo Mitsui Banking Corporation, Hiroshima Branch is Kamiya-cho 1 Chome. (Note: The branch had been in Nakajima-Honmachi before it was transferred to a new building in Kamiya-cho.)

The bank was built in 1928. It was designed by Kenzō Takekoshi at the department of engineering of Sumitomo Group (now Nikken Sekkei), and was constructed by the Obayashi Corporation. The building was constructed out of reinforced concrete, with four floors above ground and one below with an open ceiling up to the third floor. The rooms for business, reception and coinage were on the first floor, the meeting rooms and cafeteria on the fourth floor, and the boiler room in the basement. It was built south of the head office of Geibi Bank (now head office of Hiroshima Bank), which had been built the year before and was almost the same size. It was designed in a general Romanesque architectural style, and was characterized by a large arch with molding on its front façade.

The building was severely damaged in the bombing of August 6, 1945. Although most of the building's interior was destroyed, the coin room, cash, and passbooks were undamaged. Papers from inside the building were blown as far away as Numata-cho by the blast. (Note: According to the online map, it is approximately nine kilometers from ground zero to Numata-cho.)

On the morning of the bombing, the bank was to be open as usual. Most of the employees were on their way to the office when the bomb was dropped. There were 29 employees killed immediately (including those in the branch and those on their way to work), 40 were injured and none missing. Some of the survivors died within a few days from radiation sickness, while others worked until retirement. Passersby took refuge in the building as it was close to ground zero, and a large number of bodies were recovered.

After the war, the Hiroshima Branch reopened. "The Human Shadow of Death" and the Atomic Bomb Dome quickly became landmarks for the destructive power of the bomb and the loss of life. To preserve the shadow, in 1959 Sumitomo Bank built a fence surrounding the stone, and in 1967 the stone was covered with tempered glass to prevent its deterioration.

The Hiroshima Branch was rebuilt in 1971. The stone steps with the shadow were removed and donated to the Hiroshima Peace Memorial Museum.

== See also ==
- Hiroshima Peace Memorial Museum
- Tomb of the Unknown Soldier
