= Yoshito Matsushige =

Japanese photojournalist

- Born: January 2, 1913; Kure, Japan
- Died: January 16, 2005 (aged 92)
- Occupation: Photojournalist
- Known for: Survivor of 1945 Atomic Bomb explosion in Hiroshima

Yoshito Matsushige (松重 美人, Matsushige Yoshito; January 2, 1913 – January 16, 2005) was a Japanese photojournalist who survived the dropping of the atomic bomb on the city of Hiroshima on 6 August 1945 and took five photographs on the day of the bombing in Hiroshima, the only photographs taken that day within Hiroshima that are known.

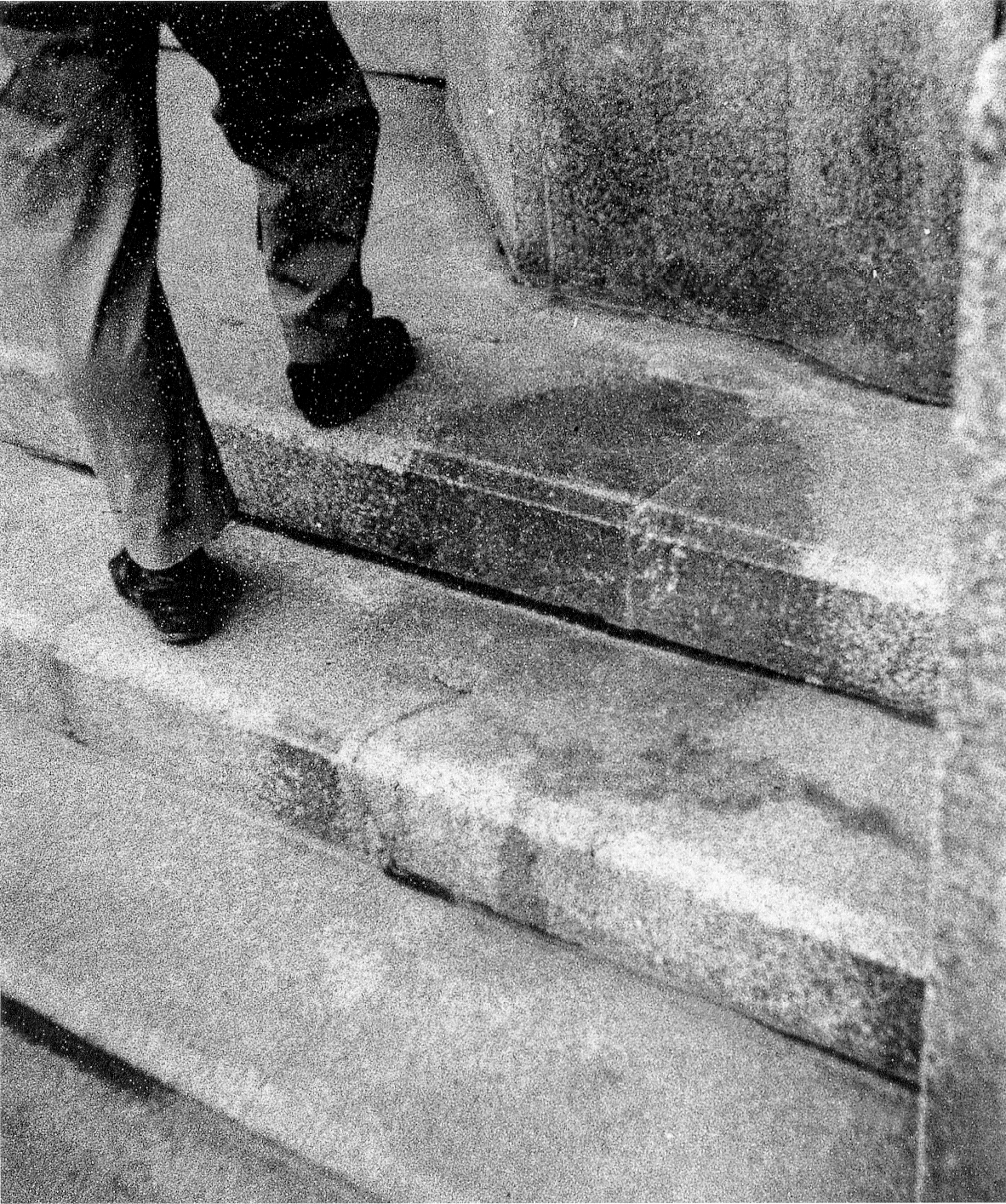
Human Shadow Etched in Stone (photographed by Yoshito Matsushige in ca. December, 1946)

Matsushige was born in Kure, Hiroshima in 1913. He took a job at a newspaper after finishing school and in 1943 entered the photography section of the newspaper Chugoku Shimbun.

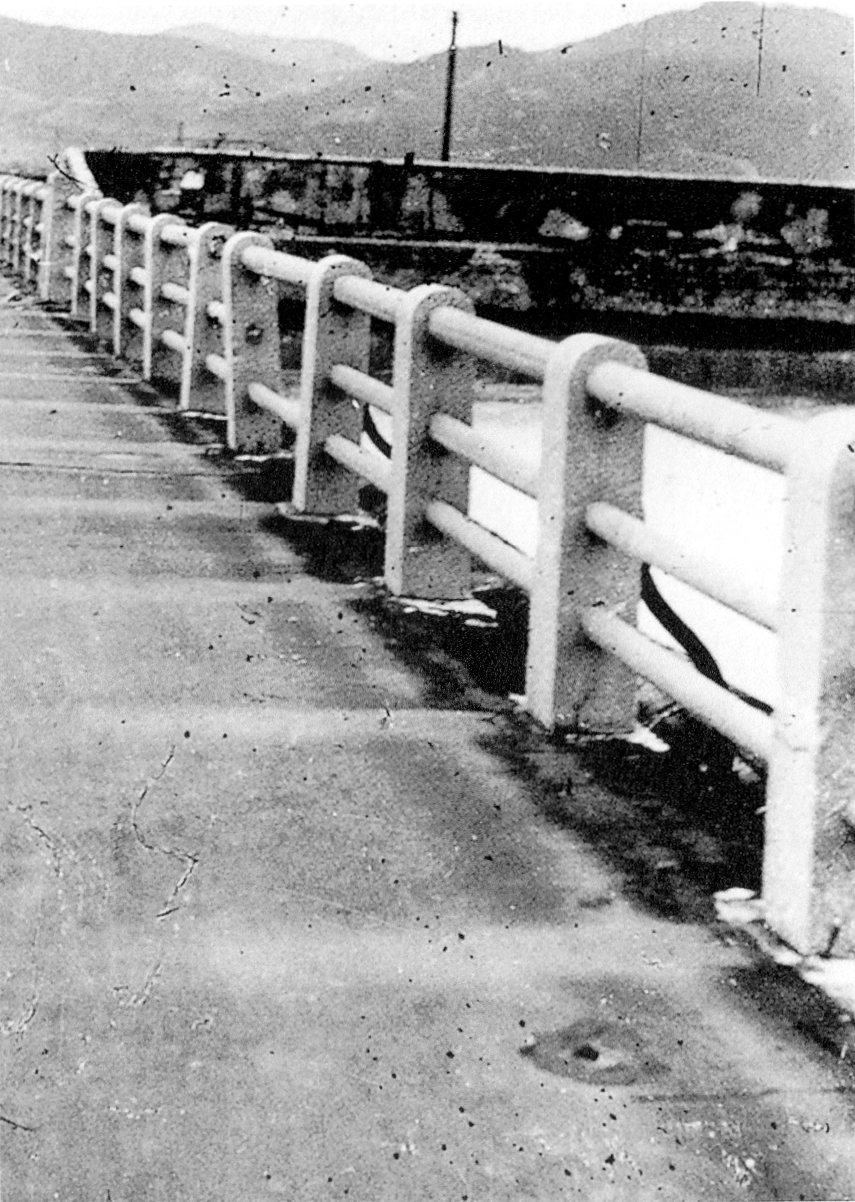
shadows by thermal rays of atomic bombing at Yorozu Bridge (photographed by Yoshito Matsushige in ca. October, 1945)

Matsushige was at home 2.7 km south of the hypocentre at the time of the explosion. He was not seriously injured, and determined to go to the city centre. A fire forced him back to Miyuki bridge, where the scene of desperate and dying people prevented him from using his camera for twenty minutes, when he took two frames at about 11:00. He tried again later that day but was too nauseated to take more than three more frames. The first two frames are of people who escaped serious injury next to Miyuki bridge; the second of these is taken closer up and shows them having cooking oil applied to their burns. A third shows a policeman, his head bandaged, issuing certificates to civilians. The last pair are taken close to home: one of the damage to his family's barbershop, and another out of his window.

Matsushige was unable to develop the film for twenty days, and even then had to do so at night and in the open, rinsing it in a stream. The negatives had severely deteriorated by the 1970s, requiring intensive restoration work.

== Selected photos ==
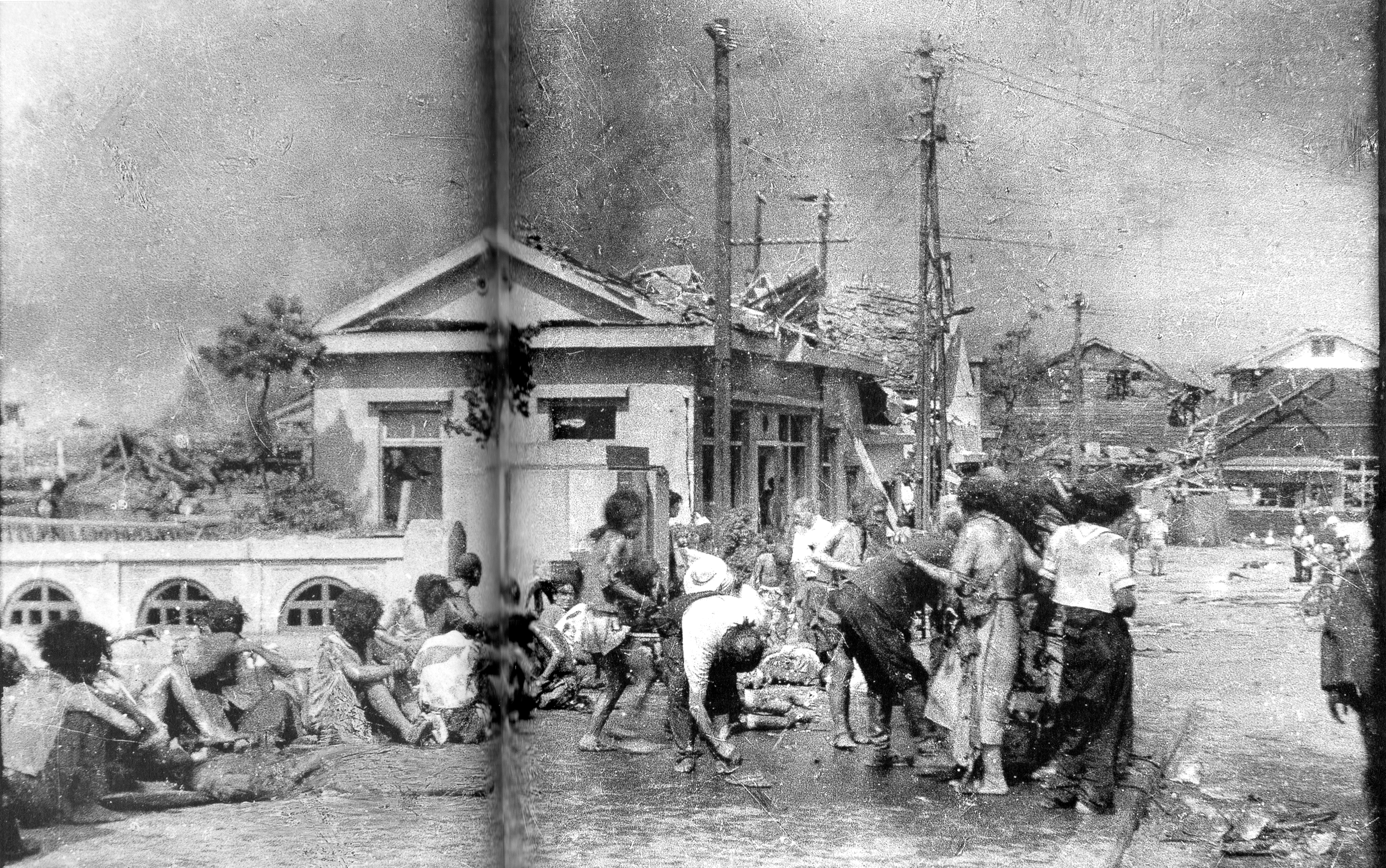
A scene in Hiroshima around 11:00 on 6 August 1945

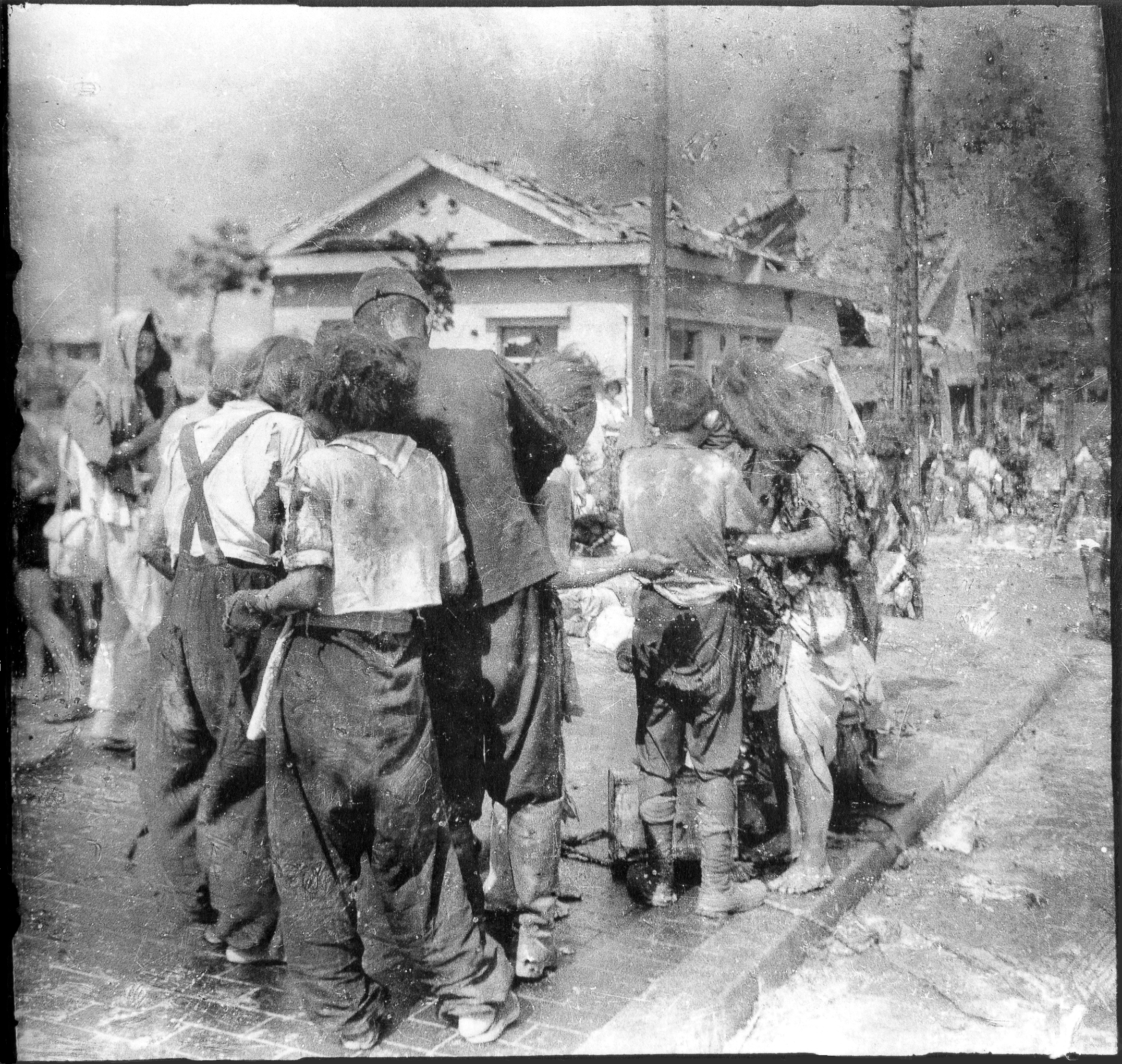
A scene in Hiroshima after 11:00 on 6 August 1945

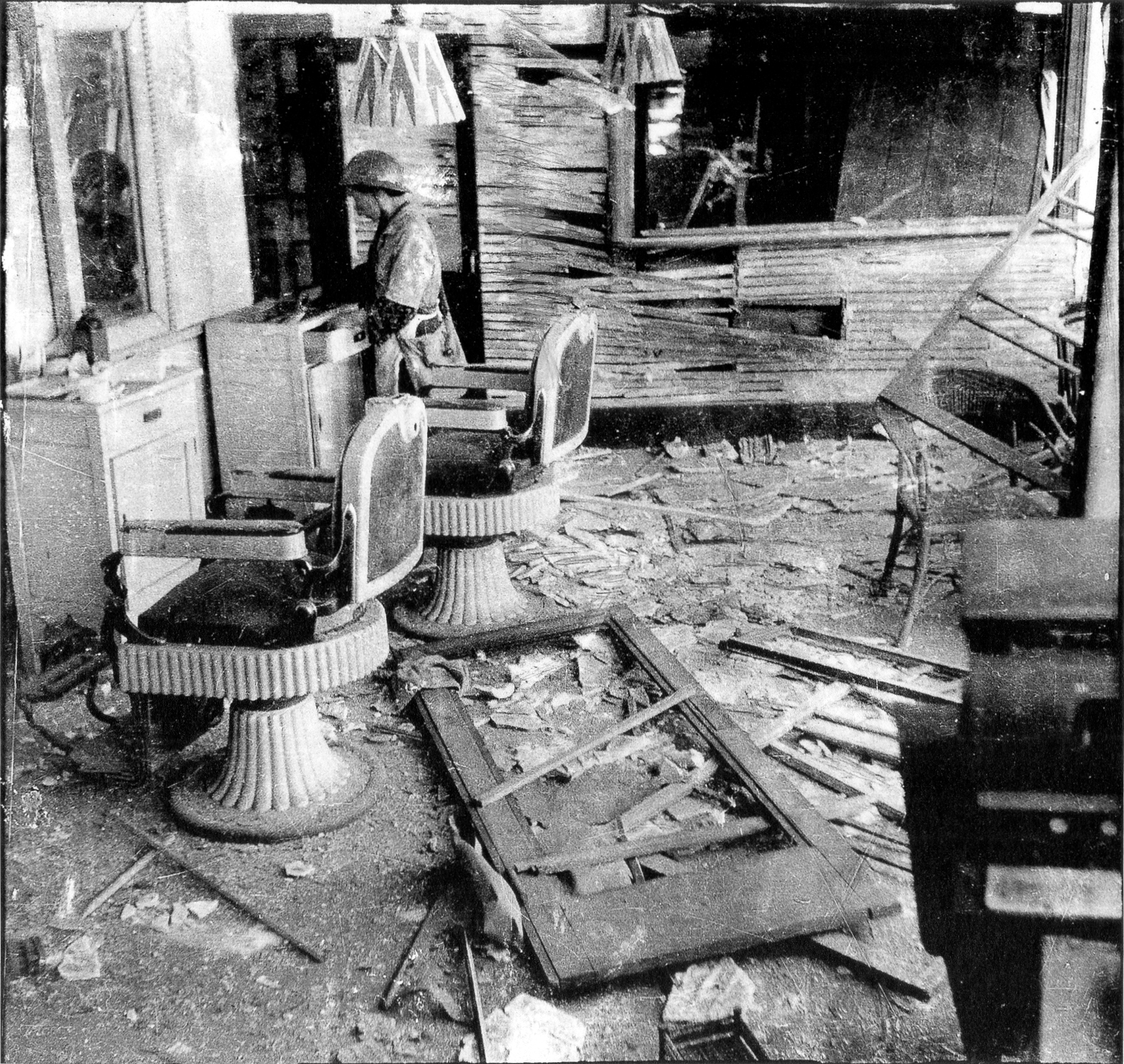
Matsushige's family barber shop after atomic bombing (around 14:00 on 6 August 1945)

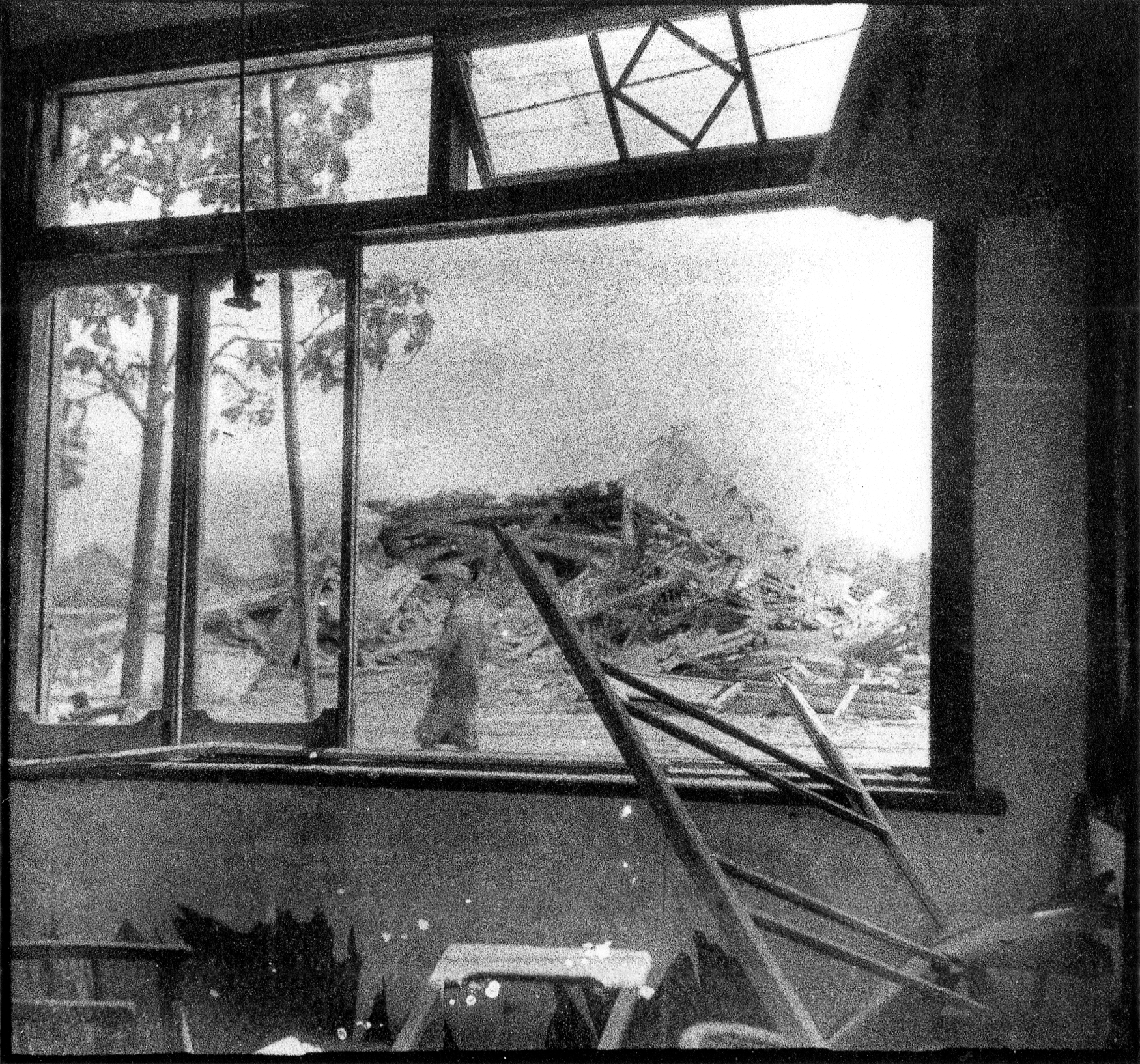
View seen from Matsushige's house (around 14:00 on 6 August 1945)

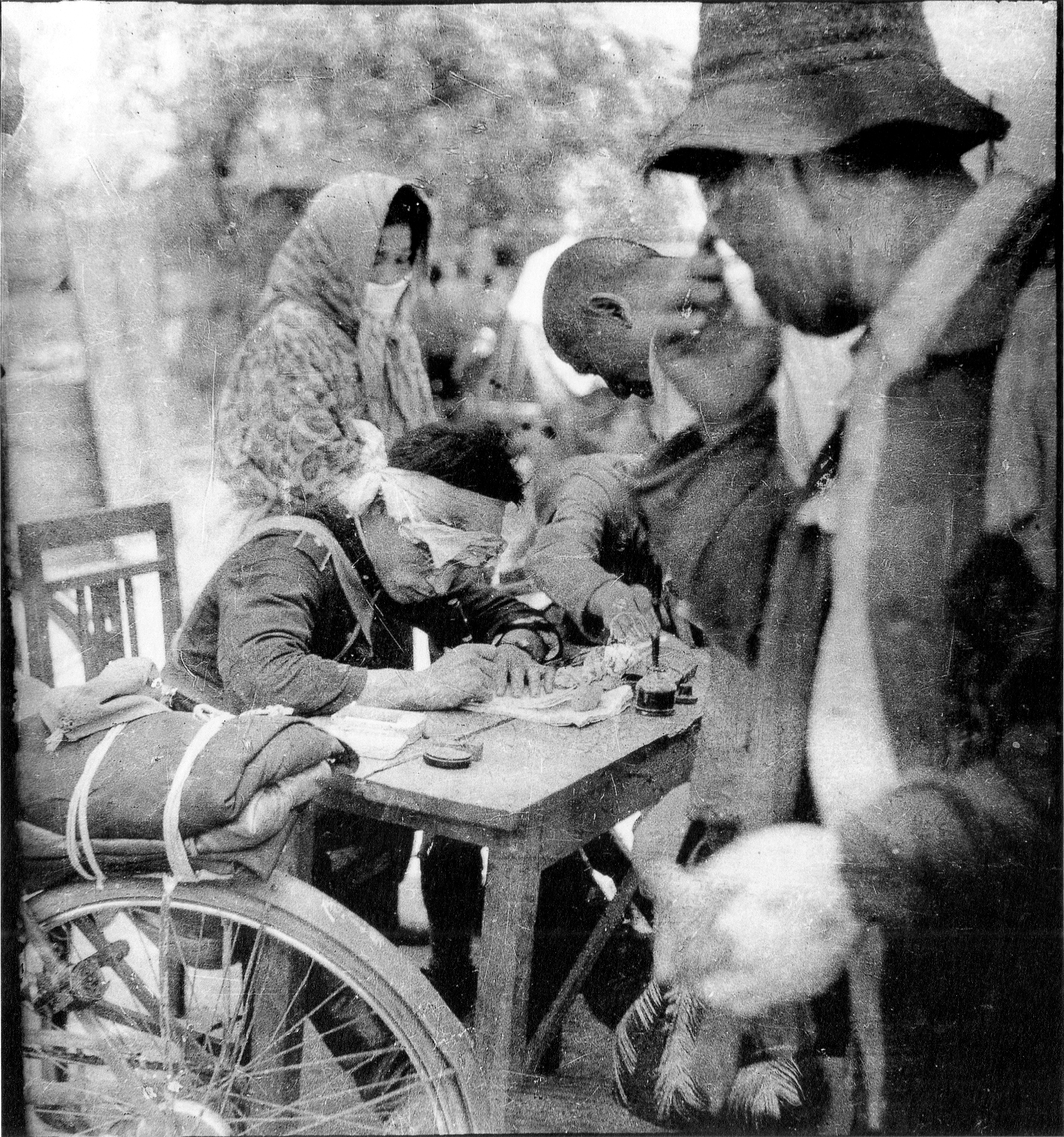
A scene in Hiroshima around 17:00 on 6 August 1945

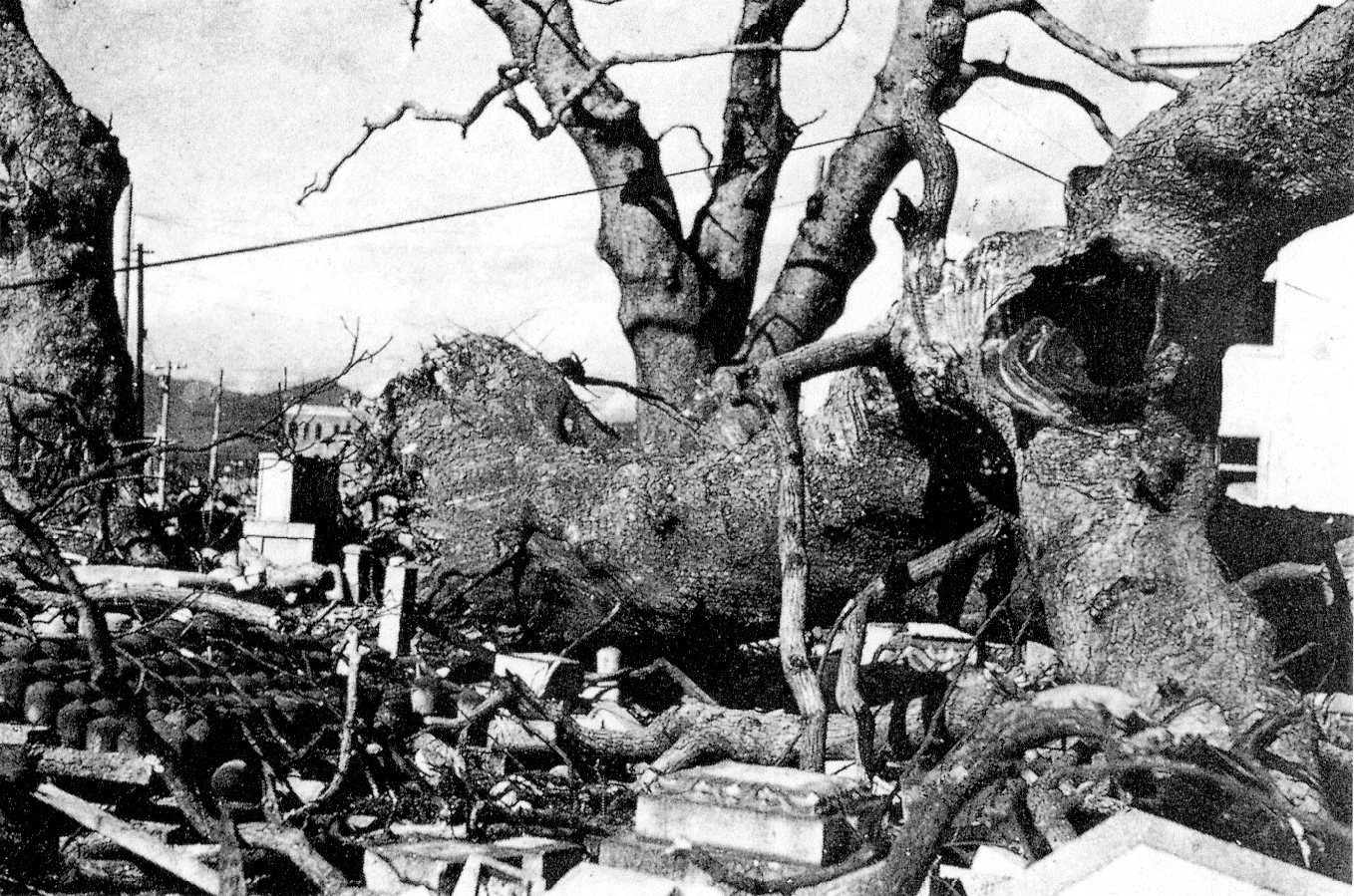
A camphor tree felled by atomic bomb's blast

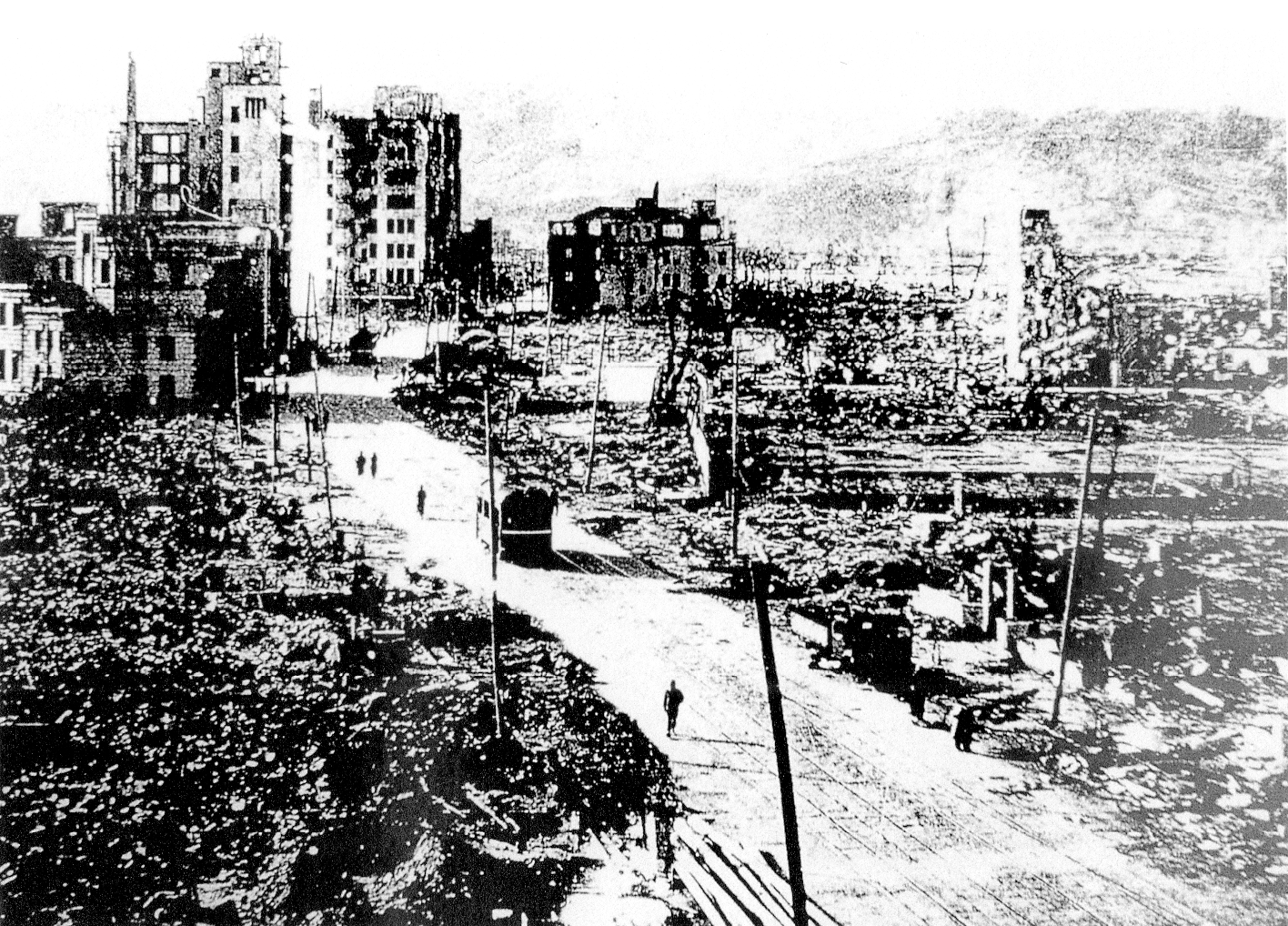
View of Hiroshima in October 1945
