= Hiroshima Peace Memorial Museum =

Hiroshima Peace Memorial Museum 広島平和記念資料館 Hiroshima Heiwa Kinen Shiryōkan
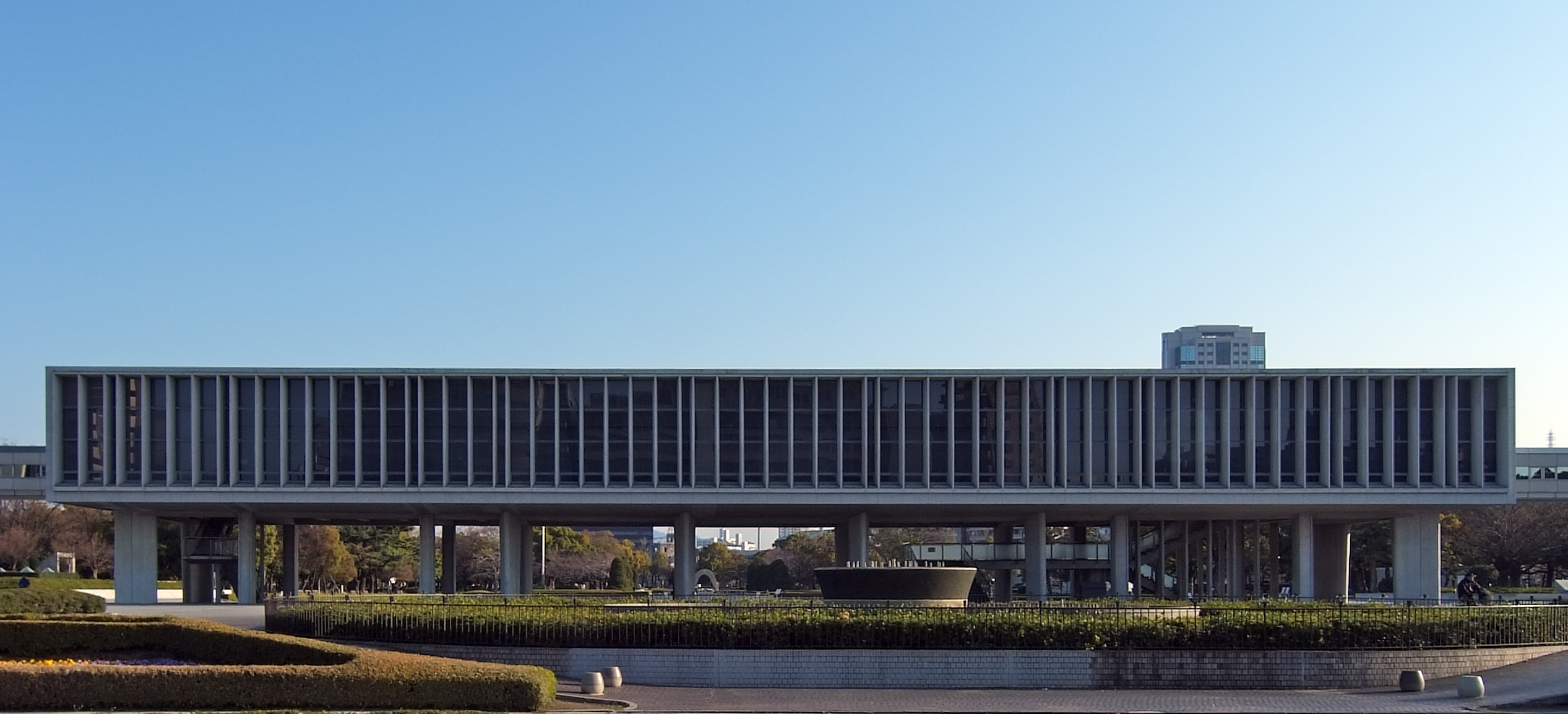

- Location within Hiroshima Prefecture Location within Japan
- Established: 1955 (71 years ago); Remodeled 1991 (35 years ago); Renovated Peace Memorial Hall 1994 (32 years ago); Renovated 2019 (7 years ago)
- Location: 1-2 Nakajima-chō, Naka-ku, Hiroshima, Japan
- Coordinates: 34°23′30″N 132°27′07″E
- Type: Peace museum
- Director: Koichiro Maeda
- Website: https://hpmmuseum.jp/

The Hiroshima Peace Memorial Museum is a museum in Hiroshima Peace Memorial Park, in central Hiroshima, Japan, dedicated to documenting the atomic bombing of Hiroshima in World War II.

The museum was established in August 1955 with the Hiroshima Peace Memorial Hall (now the International Conference Center Hiroshima). It is the most popular of Hiroshima's destinations for school field trips from all over Japan and for international visitors. 53 million people visited the museum between 1955 and 2005, averaging over one million yearly. The architect of the main building was Kenzō Tange.

== Museum content ==
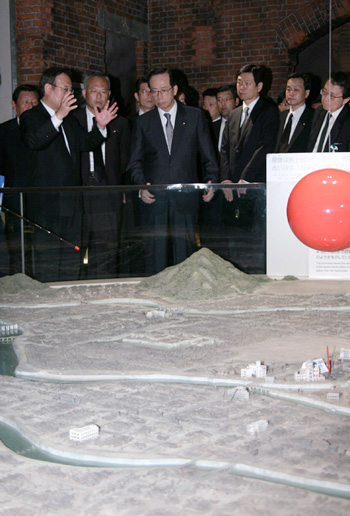
Hiroshima mayor Tadatoshi Akiba and Japanese Prime Minister Yasuo Fukuda with the model of the city on August 6, 2008

According to the introduction in the Hiroshima Peace Memorial Museum's English guide:

The Peace Memorial Museum collects and displays belongings left by the victims, photos, and other materials that convey the horror of that event, supplemented by exhibits that describe Hiroshima before and after the bombings and others that present the current status of the nuclear age. Each of the items displayed embodies the grief, anger, or pain of real people. Having now recovered from the A-bomb calamity, Hiroshima's deepest wish is the elimination of all nuclear weapons and the realization of a genuinely peaceful international community.

To facilitate education, the museum was renovated in 1994 and divided into two sections. The East Wing—the newest addition—described the history of Hiroshima City before the bomb, the development of and decision to drop the bomb, the lives of Hiroshima citizens during World War II and after the bombing, and the nuclear age and efforts for international peace. Included in this section was a model showing the damage done to the city. It had some important letters exchanged between scientists and top leaders of that era talking about atomic development and its expected results.

The West Wing concentrated on the damage the bomb caused. Sections included Material Witness, which showed clothing, watches, hair, and other personal effects worn by victims of the bomb; Damage by the Heat Rays, a section that showed what the heat did to wood, stone, metal, glass, and flesh; Damage by the Blast, focusing on the destruction caused by the blast's aftershocks, and Damage by the Radiation, which detailed the human health effects.

The museum began major renovations in 2014. The East Wing reopened in 2017, featuring more interactive displays and replacing the model of the city with a version that uses projection mapping to demonstrate the bomb blast's effects. When the East Wing reopened, the Main Hall was closed for seismic retrofitting until 25 April 2019. The exhibits were also renovated during this time to focus more on victim's belongings, and are now divided into four sections: an introductory exhibit in the East Wing, "Reality of the Atomic Bombing" and a gallery in the Main Building, "Dangers of Nuclear Weapons" in the East Wing, and "Hiroshima History" in the East Wing.

== Gallery ==
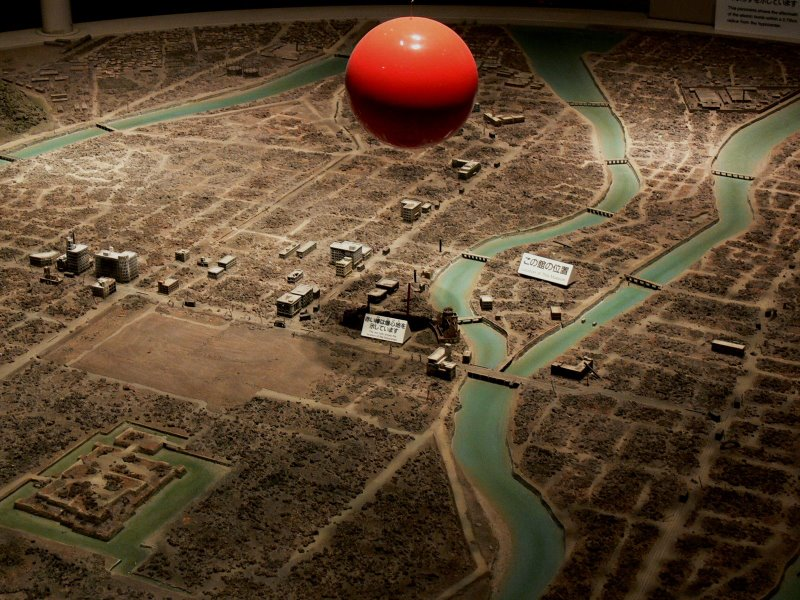
Former model of Hiroshima City flattened after the explosion. The red ball depicts the explosion point.

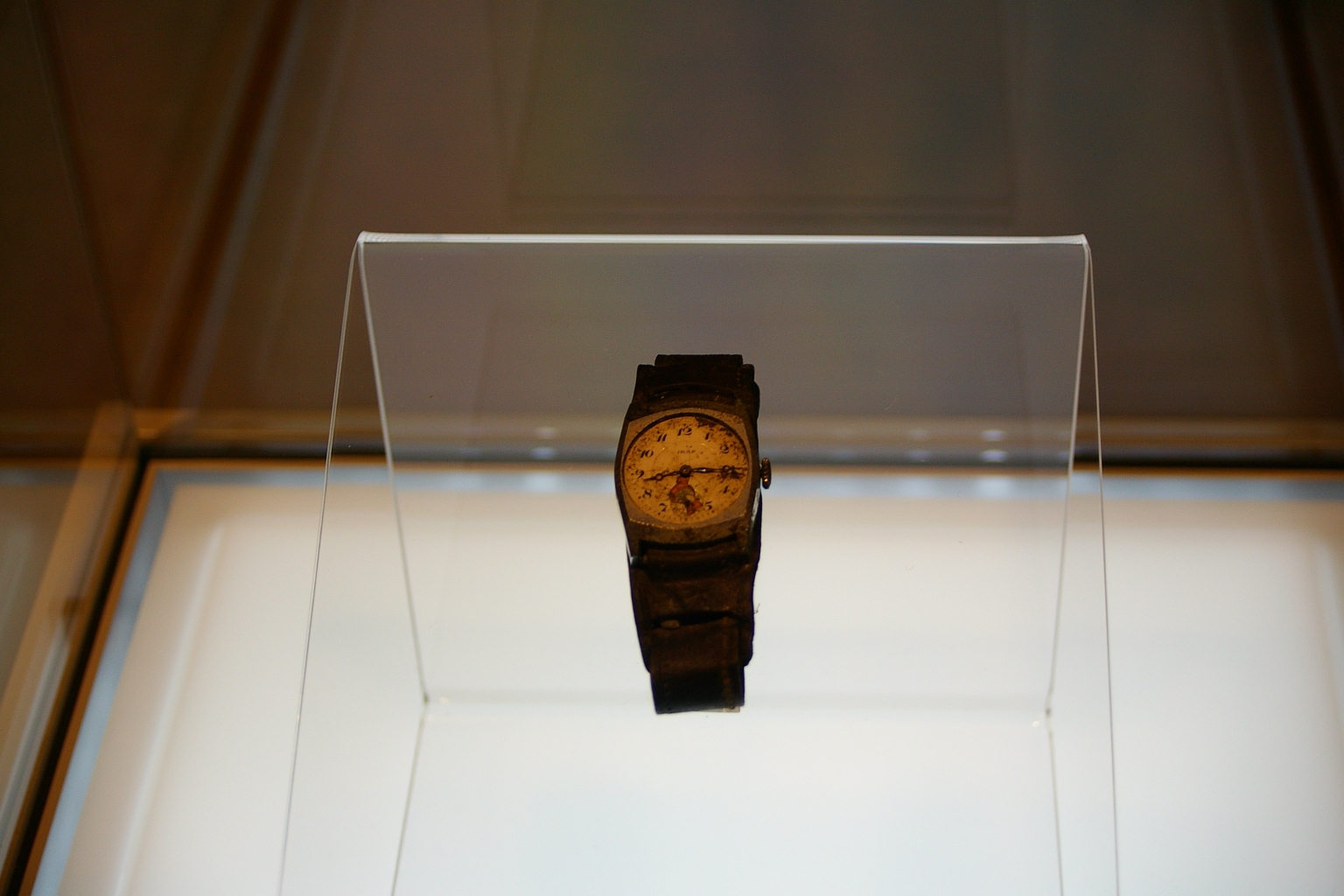
A watch stopped at the time of the atomic bombing

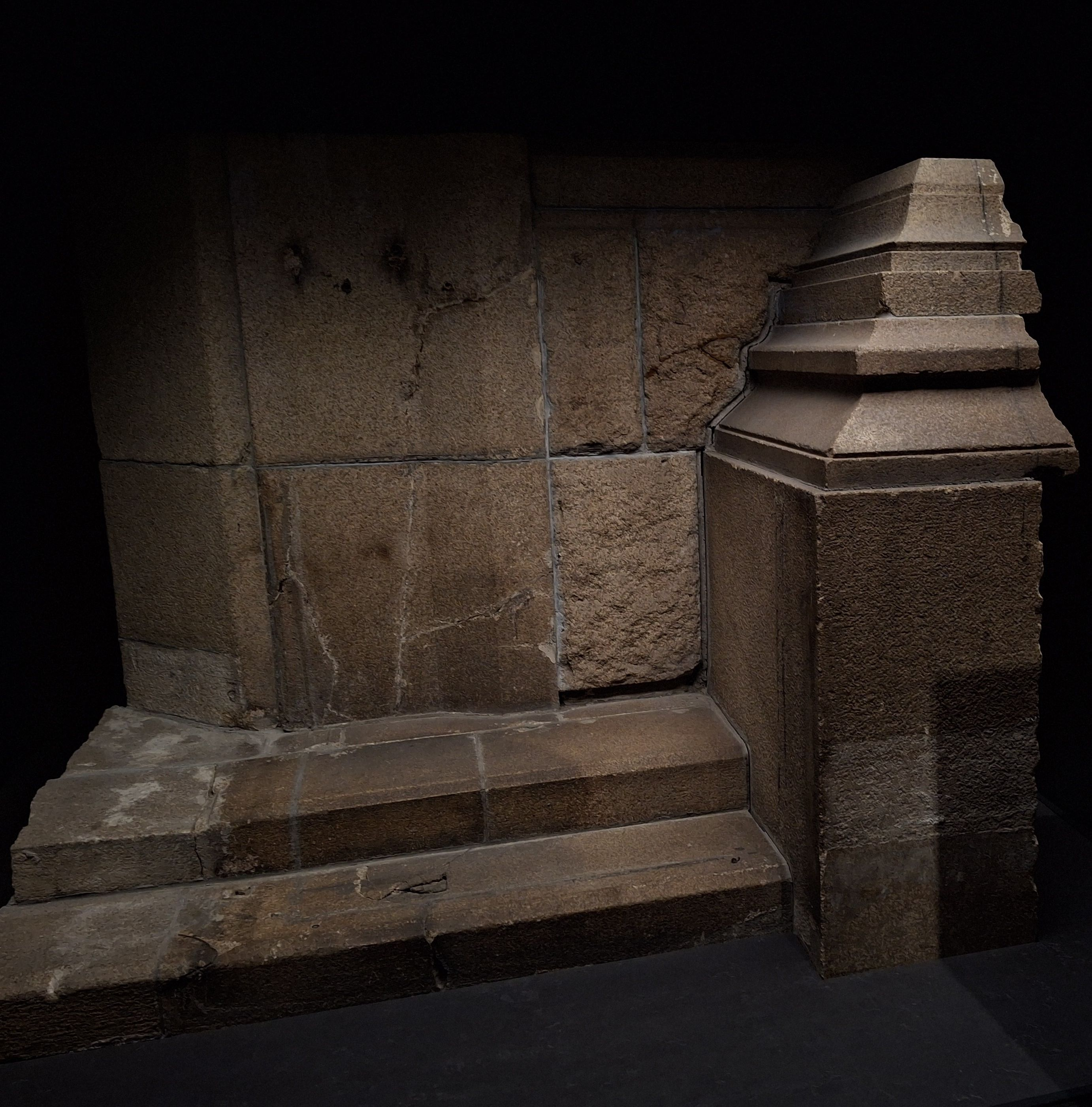
Human Shadow Etched in Stone

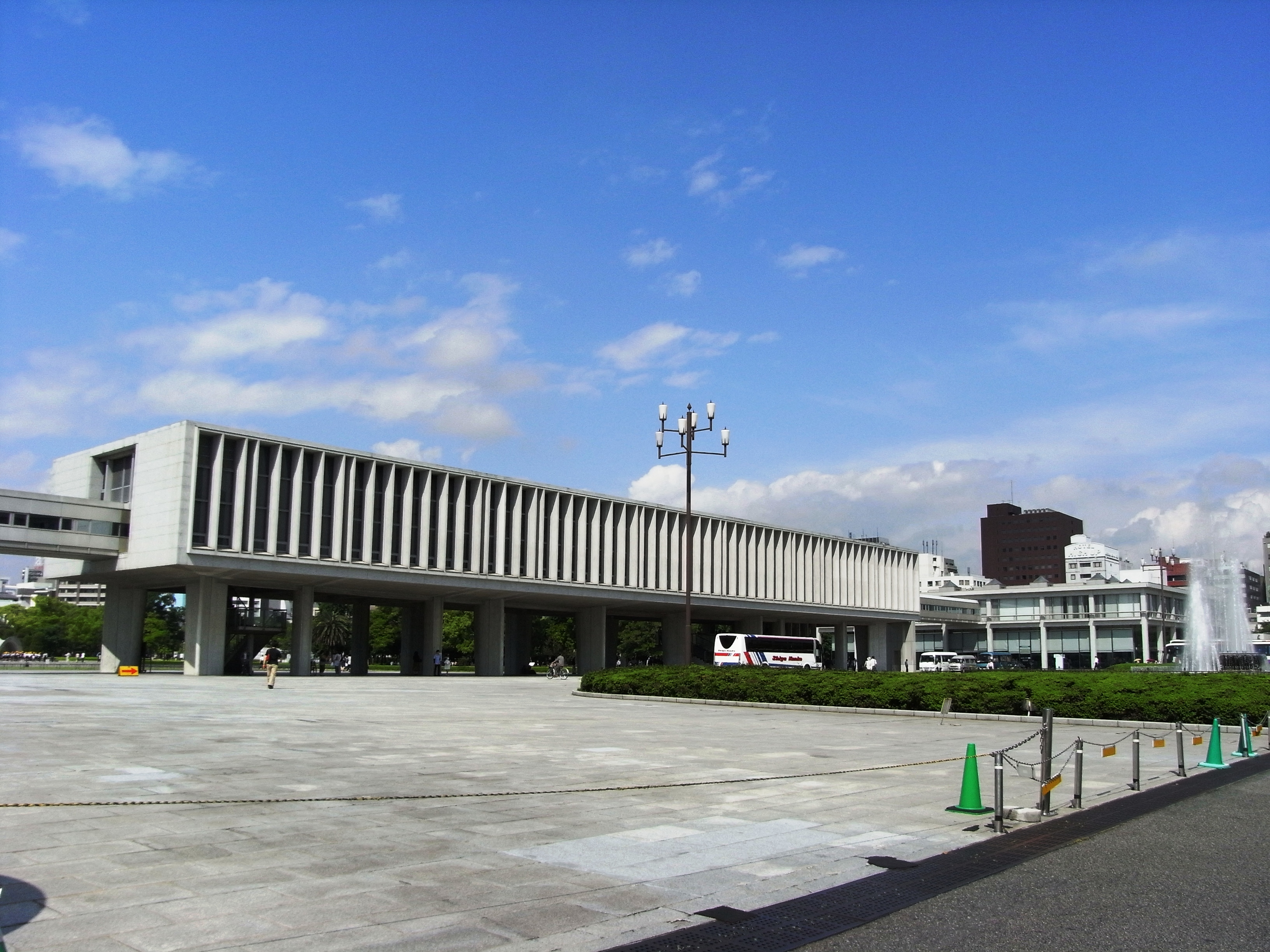
The Main Building of the Hiroshima Peace Memorial Museum

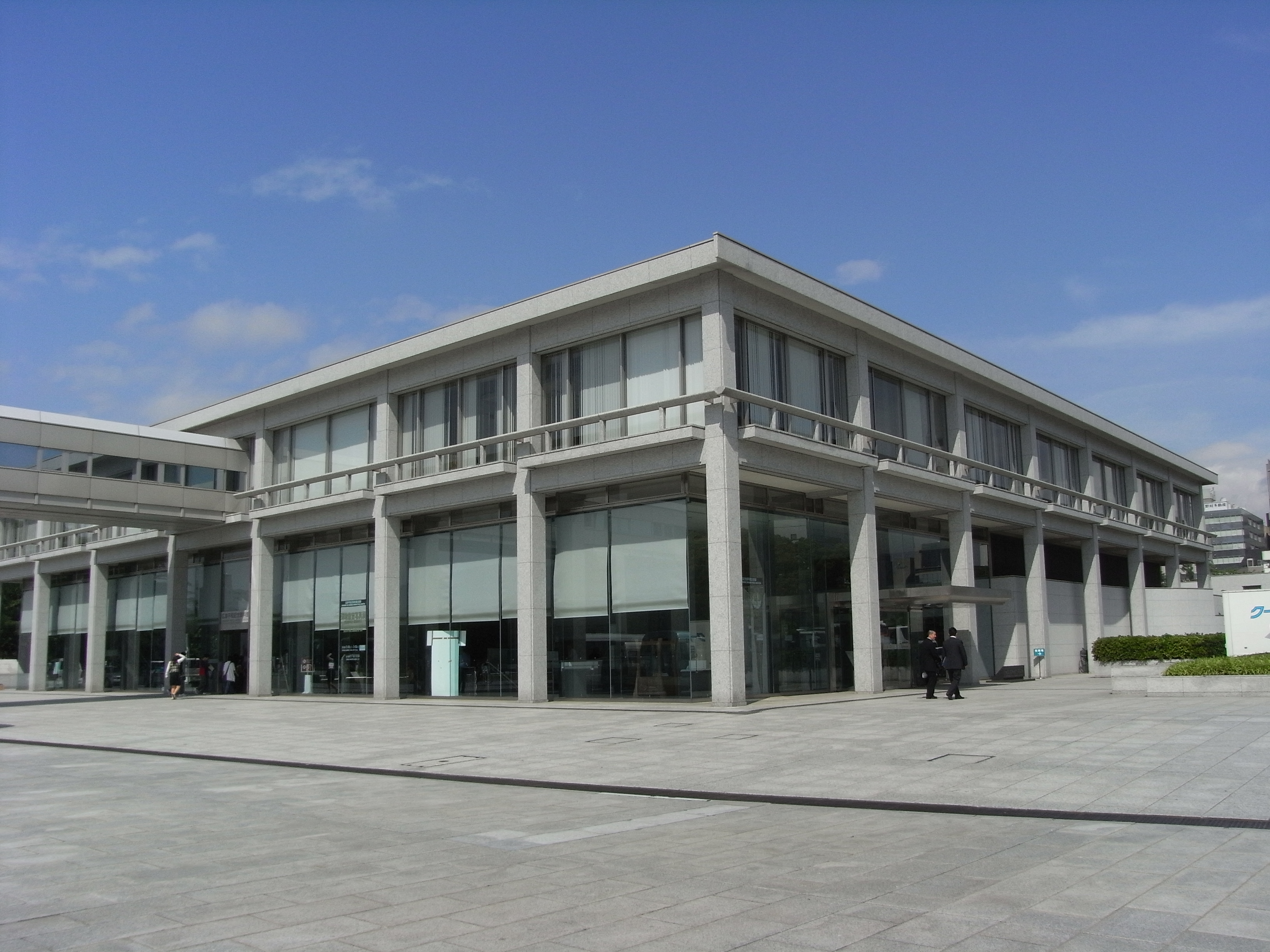
The East Building of the Hiroshima Peace Memorial Museum

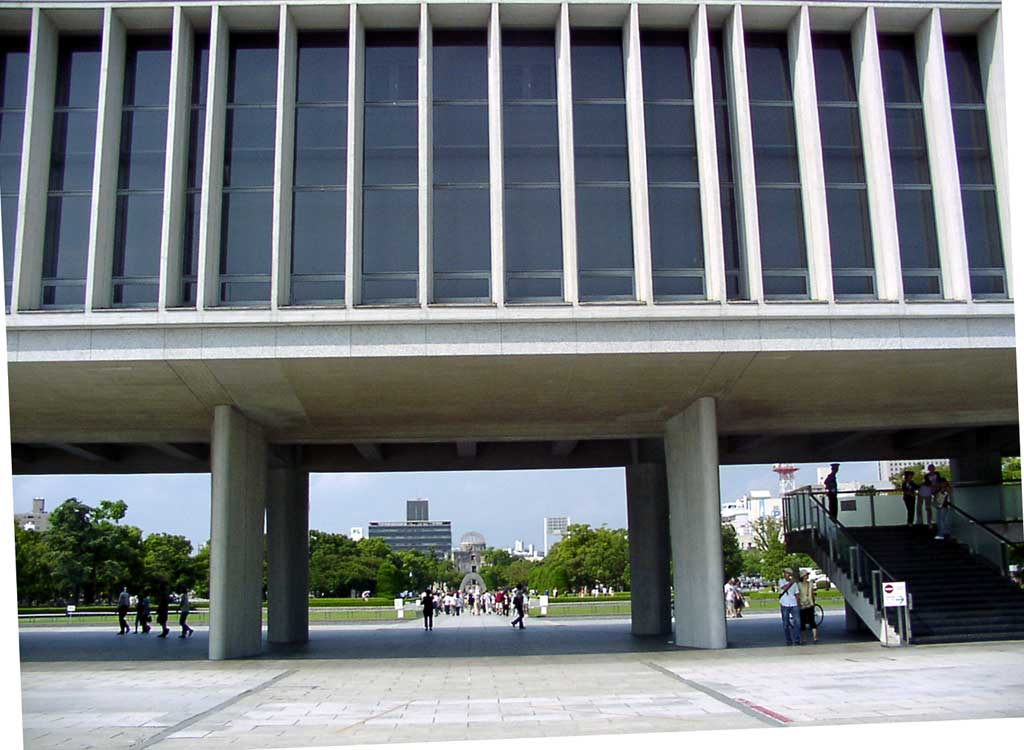
Hiroshima Peace Memorial Museum showing axis with cenotaph and A-bomb dome (1949)

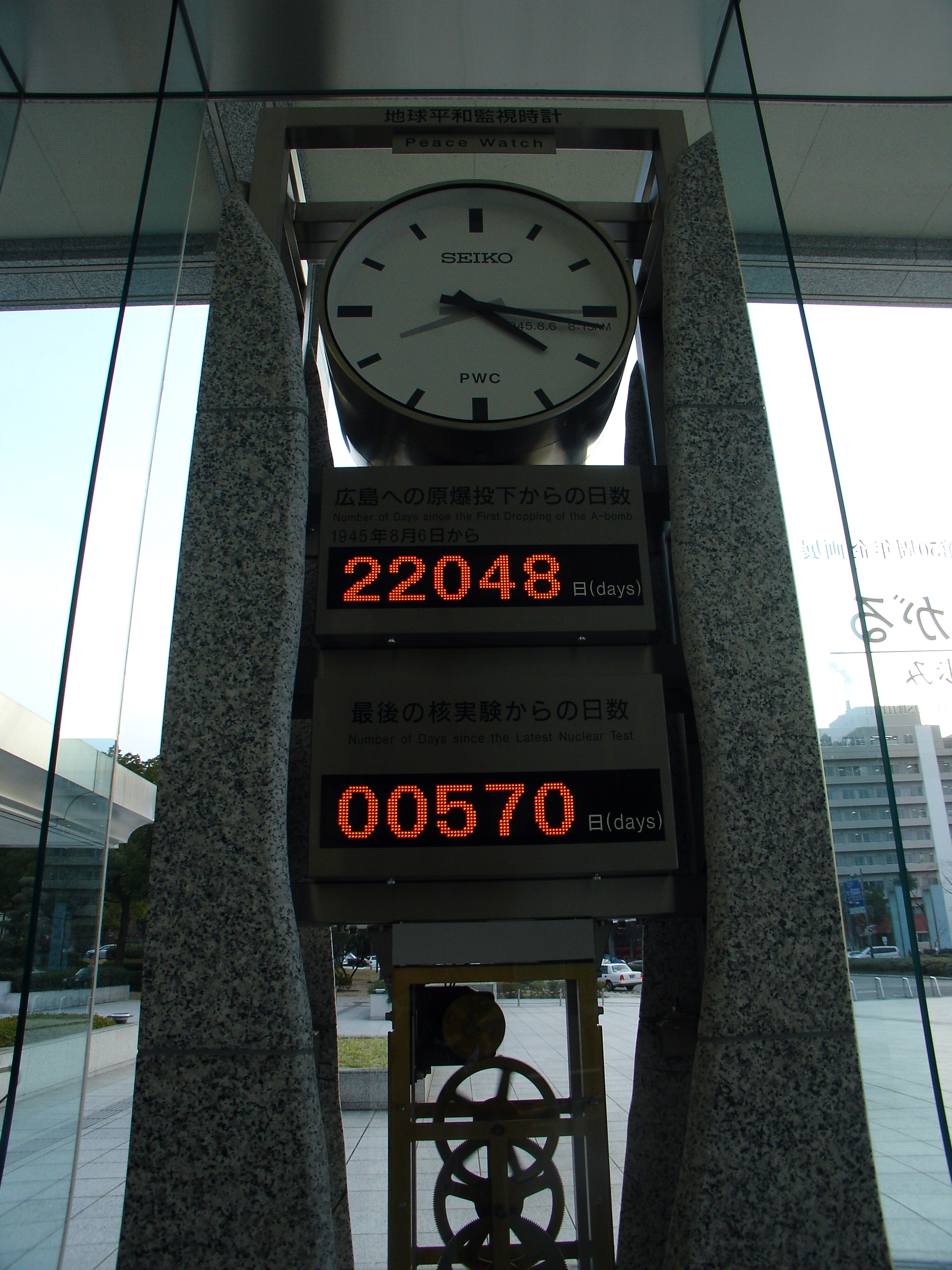
Peace Watch

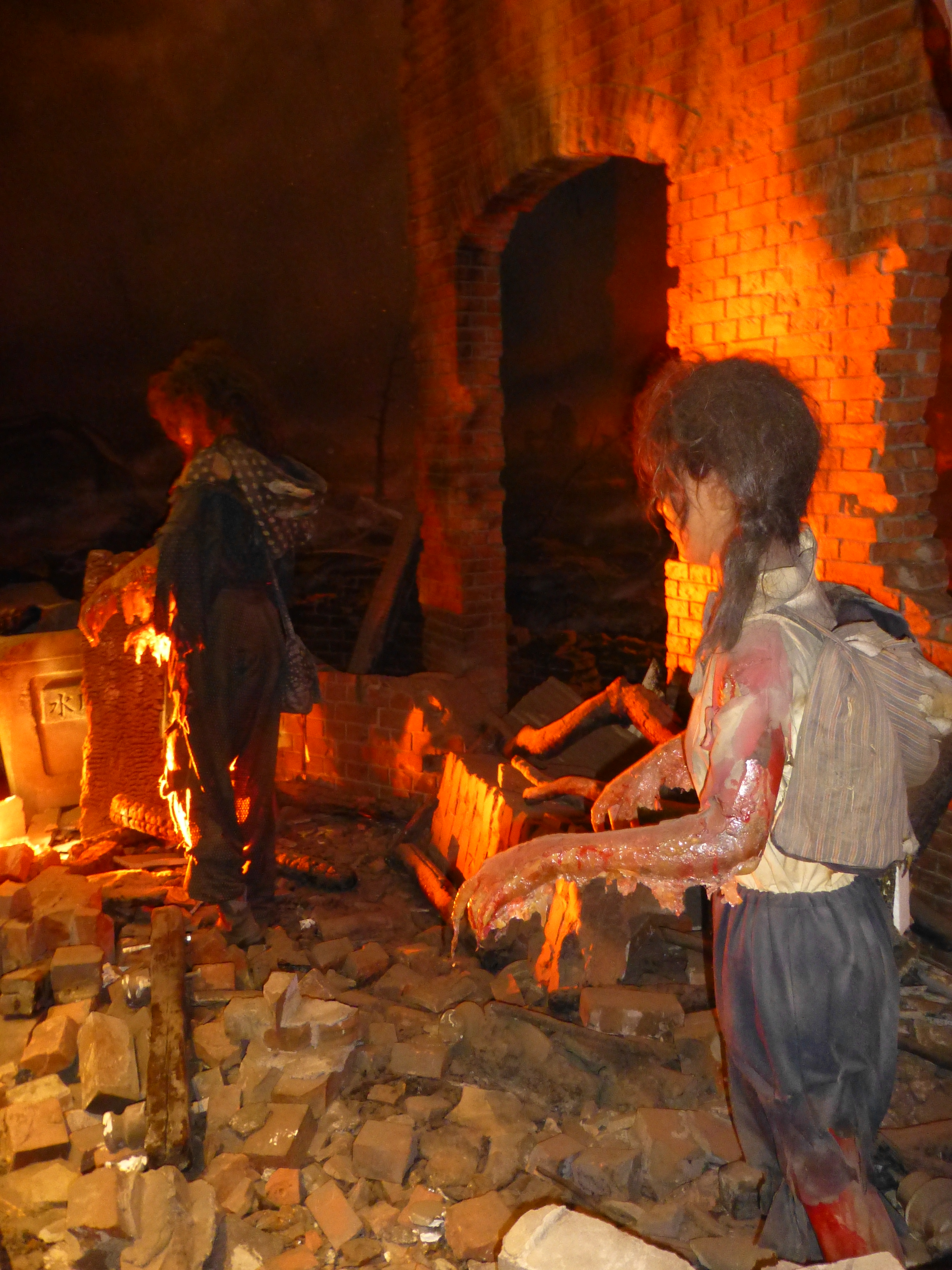
Reconstruction of physical damages on people and buildings after the explosion of the American atomic bomb in Hiroshima (August 6, 1945) at the Hiroshima Peace Memorial Museum (1973-2017)

== See also ==
- Atomic bombings of Hiroshima and Nagasaki
- Hiroshima Peace Memorial
- Hiroshima Witness – 1986 documentary film
- List of visitors to the Hiroshima Peace Memorial Museum
- Nagasaki Atomic Bomb Museum
- Nagasaki National Peace Memorial Hall for the Atomic Bomb Victims
- Nagasaki Peace Park
- Sadako Sasaki
- Human Shadow Etched in Stone - one of the exhibitions at the museum
