= Flash burn =

- United States Strategic Bombing Survey footage which is primarily an analysis of flash burn injuries to those at Hiroshima. At 2:00, as is typical of the shapes of sunburns, the protection afforded by clothing, with the nurse pointing to the line of demarcation where the pants begin to completely protect the lower body from burns. At 4:27 it can be deduced from the burn shape that the man was facing the fireball and was wearing a vest at the time of the explosion.
- Specialty: Dermatology

Flash burn is any burn injury caused by intense flashes of light, high voltage electric current, or strong thermal radiation. These may originate from, for example, a sufficiently large BLEVE, a thermobaric weapon explosion or a nuclear blast of sufficient magnitude. Damage to the eye(s) caused by ultraviolet rays is known as photokeratitis.

== Shadows ==
In some instances, such as after the atomic bombings of Hiroshima and Nagasaki, shadows can be left on surrounding surfaces after flash burns. A notable example is Human Shadow Etched in Stone.

== Additional images ==
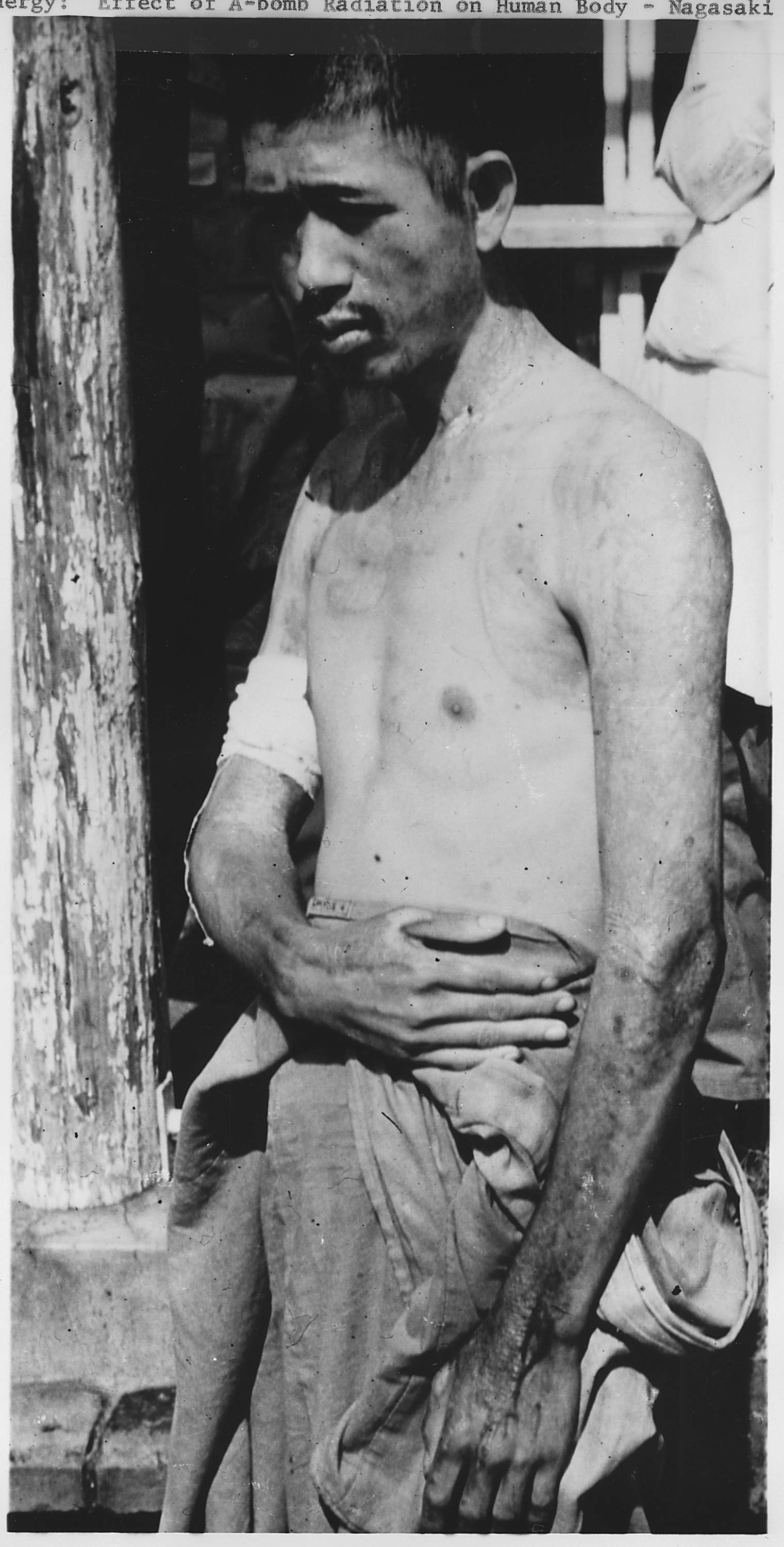
A man who was present at Nagasaki on August 9, 1945, during the dropping of the 20 kiloton Fat Man bomb, this photo displays that 1st and 2nd degree burn injuries he experienced on his unclothed skin, the shoulder and arm, while the thin vest garment of clothing that he was wearing at the time of the explosion completely protected his stomach and lower chest from experiencing similar burns. A clearer color restored version of this picture is also available.
