= List of visitors to the Hiroshima Peace Memorial Museum =

Hiroshima Peace Memorial Museum
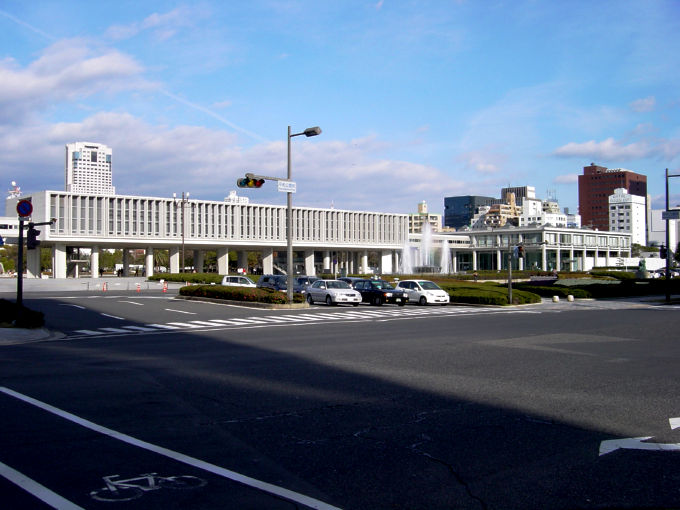
- Established: 1955, remodeled 1991, renovated Peace Memorial Hall 1994
- Location: 1-2 Nakajima-cho, Naka-ku, Hiroshima
- Director: Koichiro Maeda
- Website: www.pcf.city.hiroshima.jp

The Hiroshima Peace Memorial Museum is located in Hiroshima Peace Memorial Park, in central Hiroshima, Japan. It was established on August 24, 1955. The vision of the museum is the complete international abolition of all nuclear weapons, and the promotion of world peace. Fifty-three million people had visited the museum from its opening in 1955 through 2005. The number of visitors is over one million per year. Since the museum opened, there have been numerous visits, by heads of state, foreign dignitaries, political figures, peace activists, and various celebrities or other notable figures.

== List of notable figures ==
Date	Distinguished visitor	Nationality	remark, "Message for Peace"
October 9, 1957	Jawaharlal Nehru	India	Prime Minister of India
December 9, 1958	Douglas MacArthur II	US	US Ambassador
July 26, 1959	Ernesto Guevara	Argentina	visited as a Cuban ambassador
August 7, 1960	Akihito	Japan	Crown Prince of Japan
April 16, 1963	Elisabeth Schwarzhaupt	West Germany	Health Minister of West Germany
January 27, 1964	Baudouin	Belgium	King of Belgium
April 11, 1964	Richard Nixon	US	visited four years before his presidency and laid a wreath
June 19, 1964	Syed Harun Putra	Malaysia	Yang di-Pertuan Agong of Malaysia
March 19, 1965	Paolo Marella	Vatican City	Ambassador of Holy See
October 31, 1965	Valentina Tereshkova	USSR	Cosmonaut
October 10, 1966	Jean-Paul Sartre	France	Philosopher, political activist
October 16, 1968	Alexis Johnson	US	US Ambassador
October 31, 1969	Armin H. Meyer	US	US Ambassador
May 10, 1970	Gustav Heinemann	West Germany	President of West Germany
April 16, 1971	Hirohito	Japan	Emperor of Japan
August 6, 1971	Eisaku Satō	Japan	1st Prime Minister of Japan to attend the Peace Ceremony of 8/6, he introduced Japan's Three Non-Nuclear Principles
January 24, 1972	Juan Carlos I	Spain	Crown Prince of Spain
October 24, 1972	Robert Ingersoll	US	US Ambassador
August 6, 1976	Takeo Miki	Japan	Prime Minister of Japan
August 5, 1977	Hamilton Shirley Amerasinghe	Sri Lanka	President of the 31st session of the UN General Assembly
January 11, 1978	Edward Kennedy	US	Senator
December 23, 1979	Dmitry Polyansky	USSR	Soviet Ambassador
February 25, 1981	Pope John Paul II	Vatican City	Pope, "God's hope is one of peace, not one of pain." MFP
April 24, 1981	Margrethe II	Denmark	Queen of Denmark
May 6, 1981	Jayne Fonda	US	Actress
August 6, 1981	Zenko Suzuki	Japan	Prime Minister of Japan
December 8, 1981	Olof Palme	Sweden	Prime Minister of Sweden
March 13, 1982	Sandro Pertini	Italy	President of Italy
August 26, 1982	Javier Pérez de Cuéllar	Peru	Secretary-General of the UN
September 14, 1982	Isidoro Malmierca Peoli	Cuba	Foreign Minister of Cuba
May 31, 1983	Bert Röling	Netherlands	Jurist, Dutch Judge at the Tokyo Trial
August 6, 1983	Yasuhiro Nakasone	Japan	Prime Minister of Japan
November 1, 1983	Alain Delon	France	Actor
December 7, 1983	Abu Sayeed Chowdhury	Bangladesh	President of Bangladesh
February 3, 1984	Joachim Meisner	West Germany	Bishop of Berlin
March 16, 1984	Iri Maruki, Toshi Maruki	Japan	Artist of The Hiroshima Panels
April 15, 1984	Bill Hayden	Australia	Foreign Minister of Australia
May 25, 1984	Jimmy Carter	US	39th US president, visited after his presidency
July 8, 1984	San Yu	Burma	President of Burma
August 5, 1984	Floyd Schmoe	US	Pacifist, author
August 5, 1984	es:Mary McMillan	US	Founder of AWPTA current American Physical Therapy Association
September 15, 1984	Rodrigo Carazo Odio	Costa Rica	President of Costa Rica
November 10, 1984	Kalevi Sorsa	Finland	Prime Minister of Finland
November 23, 1984	Mother Teresa	India	Indian citizen, founder of Missionaries of Charity, "Let us love one another as God loves each one of us, so that the terrible evil that had ..." MFP
August 5, 1985	Leonard Bernstein	US	Conductor, composer, "Too many words already. Not enough action!" MFP
June 11, 1986	Bernard Lown, Eugueni Chazov	US	Founder of IPPNW, 1985 Nobel Peace Prize, "We physicians from the IPPNW are committed that the mistake never be repeated. ..." MFP
September 16, 1986	Maung Maung Kha	Burma	Prime Minister of Burma
December 4, 1986	Miguel de la Madrid Hurtado	Mexico	President of Mexico
February 26, 1987	Humayun Rashid Chowdhury	Bangladesh	President of the 41st session of the UN General Assembly
September 16, 1987	Ati George Sokomanu	Vanuatu	President of Ni-Vanuatu
November 5, 1987	Frederik	Denmark	Crown Prince of Denmark
August 27, 1988	Carlos López Contreras	Honduras	Foreign Minister of Honduras
November 12, 1988	Adolfo Pérez Esquivel	Argentina	Sculptor, architect and pacifist. 1980 Nobel Peace Prize, "Let me express my solidarity with the Japanese people. Hiroshima is a testimonial for ..." MFP
September 14, 1989	Julio María Sanguinetti Coirolo	Uruguay	President of Uruguay
November 4, 1989	Andrei Sakharov	USSR	Physicist, 1975 Nobel Peace Prize, "Sadness wrings my heart. We all must swear to do our best so as to avoid repeating ..." MFP
March 17, 1990	Florence Griffith-Joyner	US	Athlete, Olympic gold medalist
September 14, 1990	Hassan Gouled Aptidon	Djibouti	President of Djibouti
October 6, 1990	Oscar Arias Sánchez	Costa Rica	President of Costa Rica, 1987 Nobel Peace Prize, "I wish that all of the men and women in the world would engrave in their minds ..." MFP
November 2, 1990	Mairead Maguire	Northern Ireland	Irish peace activist, 1976 Nobel Peace Prize, "Let us put aside all thoughts and weapons of war, and pledge ourselves to use the means ..." MFP
November 10, 1990	Rafael Leonardo Callejas	Honduras	President of Honduras
April 23, 1991	Junius Richard Jayawardene	Sri Lanka	President of Sri Lanka
April 17, 1992	Mikhail Gorbachev	USSR	President of the Soviet Union, visited after his presidency
August 5, 1992	Pengiran Yusof	Brunei	Former Prime Minister of Brunei (A-bomb survivor), "To the people of Hiroshima as well as the whole world, Let us pray to GOD-ALLAH TAALA, ..." MFP
April 5, 1993	Martin Harwit	US	Director of Smithsonian National Air and Space Museum
November 4, 1993	Azlan Shah	Malaysia	Yang di-Pertuan Agong of Malaysia
November 24, 1993	Yuriko Kuronuma	Japan	Japanese violinist, "Seeing evidence that makes me embarrassed to be a member of the human race makes me ..." MFP
April 22, 1994	Ingvar Carlsson	Sweden	Prime Minister of Sweden
May 7, 1994	Mamoru Mohri	Japan	Japanese astronomer
October 5, 1994	Juan Antonio Samaranch	Spain	President of the International Olympic Committee
February 25, 1995	Mary Robinson	Ireland	President of Ireland
March 30, 1995	The Dalai Lama	Tibet	14th Dalai Lama, 1989 Nobel Peace Prize, "As humans, we all have the duty to eliminate, from this earth, weapons with destructive ..." MFP
August 8, 1995	Richard von Weizsäcker	Germany	President of Germany
September 16, 1995	Alberto Fujimori	Peru	President of Peru
November 1, 1995	Helmut Schmidt	Germany	Chancellor of Germany
December 6, 1995	Václav Havel	Czech Republic	President of the Czech Republic
December 6, 1995	K. R. Narayanan	India	President of India
December 6, 1995	Kenzaburō Ōe	Japan	Author, 1994 Nobel Prize in Literature, "I have been to this memorial museum on many occasions. Today, I visited here once again ..." MFP
December 6, 1995	Elie Wiesel	US	Romanian-born Jewish-American writer, 1986 Peace Prize, "We shall remember, We must remember, for only in memory is there some hope for us all." MFP
August 28, 1996	Betty Williams	Northern Ireland	Cofounder of Community of Peace People. 1976 Nobel Peace Prize, "May we always remember the tragedy of this lovely city. May we all work to make sure ..." MFP
July 28, 1997	Frederik W. de Klerk	South Africa	President of South Africa, 1997 Nobel Peace Prize, "I was deeply touched. It must never happen again! Now is the time for an effort like ..." MFP
November 12, 1997	Shimon Peres	Israel	Former Prime Minister of Israel, 1994 Nobel Peace Prize, "This is the greatest declaration against war in human history; it is also the greatest ..." MFP
April 18, 1998	Oscar Luigi Scalfaro	Italy	President of Italy
June 12, 1998	Kuniwo Nakamura	Palau	President of Palau
June 27, 1998	Kazimierz Smoleń	Poland	Director of Auschwitz concentration camp memorial and former Polish prisoner in the Auschwitz concentration camp
July 3, 1998	Milorad Dodik	Republika Srpska	Prime Minister of Republika Srpska
November 6, 1998	Girija Prasad Koirala	Nepal	Prime Minister of Nepal
December 9, 1998	Seamus Heaney	Northern Ireland	Irish poet, 1995 Nobel Prize in Literature, "The Peace Memorial Museum putting enlightenment where there was darkness ..." MFP
July 31, 1999	Vasco Rocha Vieira	Macau	Governor of Macau.
March 12, 2000	Abdallah Baali	Algeria	Ambassador of Algeria
May 12, 2000	José Arnoldo Alemán Lacayo	Nicaragua	President of Nicaragua
August 3, 2000	Hisashi Inoue	Japan	Writer, "This phrase Protest and survive is a wise word by anti-nuclear activist and physicist of the UK. I add the word Remember to the formula." MFP
September 19, 2000	Carlos Filipe Ximenes Belo	East Timor	Roman Catholic bishop, 1996 Nobel Peace Prize, "I would like to thank the Mayor and the Director of the Museum for their sympathy ..." MFP
February 17, 2001	Abdulsalami Abubakar	Nigeria	Head of State of Nigeria
February 22, 2001	Teburoro Tito	Kiribati	President of Kiribati
April 15, 2001	Helen Clark	New Zealand	Prime Minister of New Zealand
February 8, 2002	Aftab Seth	India	Ambassador of India
August 3, 2002	Barbara Lee	US	U.S. House of Representatives
November 21, 2002	Grace Naledi Mandisa Pandor	South Africa	Member of Parliament of South Africa
March 3, 2003	Fidel Castro Ruz	Cuba	President of Cuba
June 7, 2003	Ranil Wickremasinghe	Sri Lanka	Prime Minister of Sri Lanka
January 29, 2004	Howard H. Baker, Jr	US	United States Ambassador
May 21, 2004	Jean Ping	Gabon	Foreign Minister of Gabon
August 5, 2004	Alexander Losyukov	Russia	Ambassador of Russia
November 4, 2004	Bertrand Delanoë	France	Mayor of Paris
November 4, 2004	Mwai Kibaki	Kenya	President of Kenya
July 23, 2005	Viktor Yushchenko	Ukraine	President of Ukraine
March 15, 2006	Bingu wa Mutharika	Malawi	President of Malawi
October 18, 2009	Lesao Lehohla	Lesotho	Deputy Prime Minister of Lesotho
October 20, 2009	Sven Alkalaj	Bosnia	Bosnian diplomat
November 30, 2010	Sheikh Hasina Wajed	Bangladesh	Prime Minister of Bangladesh
August 6, 2012	Clifton Truman Daniel	US	Grandson of President Truman
June 24, 2014	Benigno Aquino III	Philippines	President of Philippines
April 17, 2015	Caroline Kennedy	US	US Ambassador
April 20, 2016	John Kerry	US	US Secretary of State
May 27, 2016	Barack Obama	US	44th US President
May 9, 2017	Linas Linkevičius	Lithuania	Foreign Minister of Lithuania
June 30, 2017	Bohuslav Sobotka	Czech	Prime Minister of Czech Republic
March 15, 2018	Maithripala Sirisena	Sri Lanka	President of Sri Lanka

- Title noted at remark are as of date of the visit.

Messages for Peace left by above visitors can be seen at Museum site.

== See also ==
- Hiroshima Witness
- Nagasaki Atomic Bomb Museum
- Nagasaki National Peace Memorial Hall for the Atomic Bomb Victims
- Nagasaki Peace Park
