= Cinema of Paraguay =

- No. of screens: 71 (2016)
  - Per capita: 0.5 per 100,000 (2010)
- Main distributors

Produced feature films (2002-2015)
- Total: 76 (average)
- Fictional: 40
- Animated: 0
- Documentary: 36

The cinema of Paraguay has historically been small. However, this has begun to change in recent years with films like El Toque del Oboe (1998); María Escobar (2002); O Amigo Dunor (2005), which competed for Best Movie in the Rotterdam International Film Festival; Hamaca Paraguaya (2006), which was screened at the Cannes Film Festival, gaining critical acclaim both in Paraguay and abroad; 7 cajas (2012); Latas Vacías (2014); and Luna de Cigarras (2014).

== History ==
=== Early cinema ===
The first films shot in Paraguay were a series of silent shorts by Argentine director Ernesto Gunche in 1905. The first Paraguayan-made film was Hipólito Carrón's 10-minute-long silent Alma Paraguaya, made in 1925. He went on to make a number of short documentaries with his nephew and assistant cameraman Agustín Carrón Quell. A handful of documentaries were filmed in the country over the next few decades, though most of these are now lost. The 1932 documentary En el Infierno del Chaco by the Argentine Roque Funes was the first film shot in Paraguay to use sound.

=== Dictatorship ===
Feature-length film in Paraguay beings with 1955's Codicia, the first of several Argentine-Paraguayan co-productions, the most famous of which is probably La Burrerita de Ypacaraí from 1962.

The film industry in Paraguay has historically suffered from lack of funds, public interest and equipment, as well as the repressive Alfredo Stroessner government of 1954–1989. Argentine director Lucas Demare chose to film La Sed (1961), an adaptation of Paraguayan author Augusto Roa Bastos's Hijo de hombre, in Argentina because of this. The exception to this was the 1978 state-funded film Cerro Cora, directed by Guillermo Vera, which promoted the historical and political views of the Stroessner government. This was the first wholly Paraguayan-made film and was based on the events of the Paraguayan War.

Only a handful of films were made in Paraguay during the 1980s, though some Brazilian films were partly shot in the country.

=== Post-dictatorship ===
1989 saw the overthrow of Stroessner and the re-establishment of democracy. Since then the situation has slowly been improving; in 1990 the Fundación Cinemateca del Paraguay was set up and the annual Asunción Film Festival inaugurated, and several new cinemas have been built in Asunción and other Paraguayan cities. The 1994 film Miss Ameriguá gained some international interest, as did 1998's El Toque del Oboe. This has continued into the new century with films such as María Escobar (2002), Miramenometokei (2003), Hamaca Paraguaya (2006), Felipe Canasto (2010) and Semana Capital (2010). Funding remains a problem, however, and the market is dominated largely by American and Argentine films.

In 2015 Paraguay submitted its first entry for consideration for the Academy Award for Best Foreign Language Film, Arami Ullon's documentary Cloudy Times.

In September 2017, the Film Academy of Paraguay chose its second candidate for the Oscar award, Los buscadores ("Gold Seekers") by Juan Carlos Maneglia and Tana Schémbori, directors of 7 Boxes. Memory Exercises by Paz Encina was also nominated for a Goya Award in Spain.

In October 2017, the Senate approved with half sanction the bill of Audiovisual Promotion, with which the National Film Institute of Paraguay could be created.

== List of Paraguayan directors ==
- Luis A. Aguirre
- Hugo Cataldo Barudi
- Hipólito Carrón
- Enrique Collar
- Renate Costa
- Manuel Cuenca
- Jorge Díaz de Bedoya
- Paz Encina
- Hugo Gamarra
- Galia Giménez
- Hérib Godoy
- Juan Carlos Maneglia
- Marcelo Martinessi
- Agustín Carrón Quell
- Mauricio Rial
- Carlos Saguier
- Tana Schémbori
- Aramí Ullón
- Guillermo Vera

== List of Paraguayan films ==
- Codicia (1955; Argentine co-production)
- El Trueno Entre Las Hojas (1958; Argentine co-production)
- La Sangre y la Semilla (1959; Argentine co-production)
- En la Vía (1959; Argentine co-production)
- La Burrerita de Ypacaraí (1962; Argentine co-production)
- Cerro Corá (1978)
- A Cafetina de Meninas Virgens (1981; also known as Kapanga)
- Experimento Sicológico: Un Día en el Hospital Neurosiquíatrico (1985; documentary)
- El Secreto de la Señora (1989)
- Miss Ameriguá (1994)
- El Portón de Los Sueños (1998; documentary)
- El Toque del Oboe (1998)
- María Escobar (2002)
- Réquiem Por Un Soldado (2002)
- Miramenometokei (2003)
- El Invierno de Gunter (2005)
- La Tierra Ardía (2005)
- O Amigo Dunor (2005; Brazilian co-production)
- Paraguayan Hammock (2006)
- Universo Servilleta (2010)
- Felipe Canasto (2010)
- Semana Capital (2010)
- 18 cigarrillos y medio (2010)
- Che pykasumi (2011)
- 1811, Jirones de Gloria (2011)
- 7 Boxes (2012)
- Vínculos (2012)
- Libertad (2012)
- Migraña/La enamorada (2012)
- Eso que llaman amor (2012)
- Kamiseta Pyta'i (2012)
- Braian Magdaleno - La Película (2013)
- El 8 día (2013)
- Fin de la línea (2013)
- El billete (2013)
- El azúcar del naranjo (2013)
- Lectura según Justino (2013) of Arnaldo Andre
- Eliza Lynch: Queen of Paraguay (2013)
- Esperanza (2013)
- Costa Dulce (2013) of Enrique Collar
- Latas Vacías (2014) of Herib Godoy
- Luna de cigarras (2014) of Jorge Bedoya
- El tiempo nublado (2014) of Arami Ullon
- Felices los que lloran (2015) of Marcelo Torcida
- La chiperita (2015) of Hugo Cataldo Barudi
- Mangoré, por amor al arte (2015) of Luis R. Vera
- Ore ru (2017) of Armando Aquino
- Gritos del Monday (2016) of Héctor Rodríguez
- Guaraní (2016) of Luis Zorraquín
- La última tierra (2016) of Pablo Lamar
- El secuestro (2016) of Hugo Javier Cardozo
- Paraguay, droga y banana (2016) of Juan Manuel Salinas
- Truenos (2017) of Mario Goia
- Santificar lo profano (2017) of Agustín Núñez
- Saber crecer (2017) of Pedro Noah Espínola and Walter Hermosa Jr.
- Los buscadores (2017) of Juan Carlos Maneglia and Tana Schémbori
- Las Herederas (2018) of Marcelo Martinessi

=== List of Paraguayan short films ===
- Alma Paraguaya (1925)
- La Catástrofe de Encarnación (1926)
- El que se aburra aquí es porque no sabe distraerse (1926)
- Desfile Militar (1926)
- El Que se Aburra Aquí es Porque No Sabe Distraerse (1926)
- Revista Militar en Campo Grande (1926)
- Campaña electoral con la presencia de Eligio Ayala (1927)
- El Señor Ministro del Interior (1927)
- Manifestación Frente al Congreso (1928)
- Vistas del Paraguay (1929)
- Sepelio de Eligio Ayala (1930)
- La Guerra del Chaco (1933)
- Paraguay, Tierra de Promisión (1937)
- Luna de Miel en Paraguay (1968)
- La Caza y la Perdiz (1968)
- La Represa de Acaray (1969)
- Safari en el Chaco (1969)
- Paraguay, Tierra de Progreso (1970)
- El Pueblo (1971)
- Estampas de Asunción (1971)
- Oikove Don Bosco (1972)
- Crisol de Gloria (1972)
- La Voluntad de un Pueblo (1973)
- Desde el Tejado (1986)
- Cariñoso (1986)
- Caños (1987)
- El Caso de Luis (1987)
- Rutina (1987)
- La Fiesta (1988)
- Proceso de Cambio (1988; documentary)
- Las Gaviotas no Hablan Inglés (1996)
- De Amor y de Guerra (1997)
- Emboscada, campo de concentración (1997)
- Abuso Sexual (1997)
- Asunción a Cuatro Tiempos (1997)
- Cachorros de León, la Batalla de Boqueron (1997)
- Caireles de Sangre, 23 de Octubre de 1931 (1997)
- Independencia (1997)
- La Selva Debe Vivir: Los Ache del Ñacunday (1997)
- Los Yshyr de Karchavalut (1997)
- Estigarribia: Militar y Presidente (1998)
- El Siglo Que Se Va (2000)
- Una y Media (2001), by Luis A. Aguirre.
- Horno Ardiente (2002)
- Candida (2003)
- La Cajita Feliz (2004)
- La Permanencia (2007)
- Ahendu nde sapukai (Oigo tu grito) (2008), by Pablo Lamar.
- Karai Norte (2009), by Marcelo Martinessi.
- Fuego (2009), by Sergio Marcos.
- Don Policarpo & I: Travels with a Puppeteer (2009; documentary)
- Opción 2 (2010)
- Calle última (2010), by Marcelo Martinessi.
- La Tierra sin Mal (2010; documentary)
- Kuña Kamba (2010), by Miguel Agüero.
- Kuña, El machismo se hereda (2010), by Marcos Ramírez.
- Noche adentro (2010), by Pablo Lamar.
- Cuentas (2010, Coronel Oviedo), by Herib Godoy.
- Isla Alta (2011), by Federico Adorno.
- Trinidad (2011), by Andrea Gandolfo and Sergio Colmán Meixner.
- Viento sur (2011), by Paz Encina.
- Pescadape (2011, Coronel Oviedo), by Herib Godoy.
- La venganza de la vaca muerta (2011), by Carlos Tarabal.
- Mita’i (2011), by Miguel Agüero.
- Asaje Pyte (2012), by Juan Antonio Lezcano.
- El Baldío (2012), by Marcelo Martinessi.
- Vida reciclada (2013), by Daniel Candia.
- Leona (2013), by Hebe Duarte.
- Y al Tercer Día (2013), by Osvaldo Ortíz Faimán.
- Kuña pyporé (2013), by Agustín Núñez.
- Acá es así (2013), by Nelson Ibañes.
- Des-precio (2014, Ñemby), by Ricardo D. Morínigo.
- Roommate (2014), by Luis Galeano.
- Al margen (2014), by José Bogado.
- Caramelomi (2014), by Miguel Agüero.
- Antolina (2014), by Miguel Agüero.

== List of films shot in Paraguay ==
This list covers non-Paraguayan films (many Argentine or Brazilian) that were filmed, or partly filmed, there.

- Desfile del marcial Cuerpo de Bomberos al mando del comandante González, donde aparece multitud de personas conocidas (1905)
- Su excelencia el presidente de la república Dr. Cecilio Báez, en compañía del ministro de guerra, Gral Benigno Ferreira (1905)
- Mercado central, mercado guazú (1905)
- Traslado de la Virgen de la Asunción de la iglesia hasta la casa particular (1905)
- Au coeur de l'Amérique du Sud (1924; documentary)
- Le Paraguay (1925; documentary)
- Les indiens du Gran-Chaco (1925; documentary)
- En el infierno del Chaco (1932/3)
- Paraguay, Tierra de Promisión (1937)
- India (1960)
- Paraguay, Corazón de América (1961)
- Le Rat d'Amérique (1963)
- Éxtasis Tropical (1969)
- Fuiste Mía Un Verano (1969)
- O Amante de Minha Mulher (1978)
- Moonraker (1979; waterfall scenes)
- A Pantera Nua (1979)
- O Último Cão de Guerra (1979)
- República Guarani (1981; documentary)
- Vicios de Mujer (1982)
- Noites Paraguaias (1982)
- Zama (1984)
- The Mission (1986)
- Guerra do Brasil - Toda Verdade Sobre a Guerra do Paraguai (1987; documentary)
- Los Corruptores (1987)
- La Bailanta (1988)
- Desencuentros (1992)
- El Viaje (1992)
- Os Matadores (1997)
- Hoteles (2004)
- Cándido López - Los campos de batalla (2005)
- Miami Vice (2006; partly filmed in Ciudad del Este)
- The Pioneer of Paraguay (2009; South African documentary)
- South of the Border (2009; documentary film, features a brief interview with the former president Fernando Lugo in Asunción)
- El Niño Pez (2009)
- Las Acacias (2011)
- El silencio del puente (2011, documentary), by Eduardo Schellemberg, Argentina.
- First Position (2011, documentary), by Bess Kargman, United States.
- El impenetrable (2012, documentary), by Danièle Incalcaterra and Fausta Quattrini, Argentina-France.
- La dictadura del parlamentariado (2012, documentary short), by Martín Céspedes, Argentina.
- Ramón Ayala (2013), by Marco López, Argentina.
- Bye Bye Lugo (2013, documentary), by Michel von Tell, Switzerland.
- Mennonitas. Un Mundo Aparte (2013, documentary short), by Enrique Urdanoz, Spain.
- De Arriba para Abajo (2014, documental), by Juan Carlos Carrasco, Mexico.
- El Hijo Buscado (2014), by Daniel Gagliano, Argentina.
- Landfill Harmonic (2014), by Brad Allgood, Graham Townsley, United States.

== List of films about Paraguay ==
This list covers non-Paraguayan films that deal with Paraguayan issues/topics, but are not filmed there. It also covers films in which Paraguay is made reference to.

- Storm Over the Andes (1935), by Christy Cabanne, United States
- Alas sobre El Chaco (1935), by Christy Cabanne, United States
- Flirting With Fate (1938), by Frank McDonald, United States
- His Best Student (1944), by Lucas Demare, Argentina
- La manigua sin dios (1949), by Arturo Ruiz Castillo, Spain
- Las aguas bajan turbias (1952), by Hugo del Carril, Argentina
- Aeropuerto (1953), by Luis Lucia, Spain
- La Sed (1961; an adaptation of Augusto Roa Bastos's novel Hijo de hombre set during the Chaco War)
- Volver (1969), by Germán Becker, Chile
- Argentino hasta la muerte (1971), by Fernando Ayala, Argentina
- Willy Wonka & the Chocolate Factory (1971; the fifth golden ticket is reportedly found in Paraguay), Mel Stuart, United States
- The Boys From Brazil (1978; a film about Nazi-hunters in Paraguay)
- Cannibal Ferox (1981; cannibal shock film set in Paraguay)
- The Honorary Consul (aka Beyond the Limit; 1983; Richard Gere's character is Paraguayan)
- Commando Mengele (1988; a film about Jewish Nazi-hunters in Paraguay)
- Moon Over Parador (1988; set in the fictional Latin American country of Parador, a portmanteau of Paraguay and Ecuador)
- One Man's War (1991 TV film; a film about Stroessner-era Paraguay starring Anthony Hopkins)
- Diplomatic Immunity (1991), by Peter Maris, United States
- Ladybird, Ladybird (1994), one of the chief protagonists is a Paraguayan living in London
- Anaconda (1997; Jon Voight's character is from Paraguay)
- Grosse Pointe Blank (1997; features the line "I killed the president of Paraguay with a fork")
- Wedding Crashers (2005; Christopher Walken says a line about Paraguay)
- Alpha Dog (2006; the main character is said to have been caught by police in Paraguay)
- BirdWatchers (La terra degli uomini rossi; 2008), Marco Bechis, Italy-Brazil
- And Soon the Darkness (2010), Marcos Efron, United States-Argentina-France

== See also ==
- Cinema of the world
- South American cinema
- List of Paraguayan submissions for the Academy Award for Best Foreign Language Film
