= List of Paraguayan submissions for the Academy Award for Best International Feature Film =

List of films

Best International Feature Film submissions from Paraguay

Highlights
- Debut: 2015
- Submissions: 10
- Nominations: none
- Oscar winners: none

Paraguay submitted a film for the Academy Award for Best International Feature Film (Note: The category was previously named the Academy Award for Best Foreign Language Film, but this was changed to the Academy Award for Best International Feature Film in April 2019, after the Academy deemed the word "Foreign" to be outdated.) for the first time in 2015. The award is handed out annually by the United States Academy of Motion Picture Arts and Sciences to a feature-length motion picture produced outside the United States that contains primarily non-English dialogue. It was not created until the 1956 Academy Awards, in which a competitive Academy Award of Merit, known as the Best Foreign Language Film Award, was created for non-English speaking films, and has been given annually since.

As of 2026, Paraguay has submitted ten films, but none of them were nominated.

== Submissions ==
The Academy of Motion Picture Arts and Sciences has invited the film industries of various countries to submit their best film for the Academy Award for Best International Feature Film since 1956. The International Feature Film Committee oversees the process and reviews all the submitted films. Following this, they vote via secret ballot to determine the five nominees for the award.

Most of the films submitted are primary in Spanish. Below is a list of the films that have been submitted by Paraguay for review by the Academy for the award by year and the respective Academy Awards ceremony.

Year (Ceremony)	Film title used in nomination	Original title	Language(s)	Director	Result
2015 (88th)	Cloudy Times	El tiempo nublado	Spanish, English	Arami Ullon	Not nominated
2017 (90th)	The Gold Seekers	Los Buscadores	Spanish, Guarani	Juan Carlos Maneglia, Tana Schémbori	Not nominated
2018 (91st)	The Heiresses	Las herederas	Spanish	Marcelo Martinessi	Not nominated
2020 (93rd)	Killing the Dead	Matar a un muerto	Spanish, Guarani	Hugo Giménez	Not nominated
2021 (94th)	Nothing but the Sun	Apenas el Sol	Ayoreo, Spanish	Arami Ullón	Not nominated
2022 (95th)	Eami	Eami	Ayoreo	Paz Encina	Not nominated
2023 (96th)	The Last Runway 2, Commando Yaguarete	Leal 2, Comando Yaguareté	Spanish	Armando Aquino, Mauricio Rial	Not nominated
2024 (97th)	The Last	Los últimos	Spanish, Guarani	Sebastián Peña Escobar	Not nominated
2025 (98th)	Under the Flags, the Sun	Bajo las banderas, el sol	Spanish, Guarani, German, French, English, Portuguese	Juanjo Pereira	Not nominated
2026 (99th)	Narciso		Spanish, Guarani	Marcelo Martinessi	Pending

== Shortlisted Films ==
Since 2017, Paraguay has occasionally announced a list of all officially submitted films before announcing its official Oscar nominee. The following films have been submitted to the Paraguayan Film Academy:

Year	Films
2017	Memory Exercises
2018	The Last Runway
2019	Cadete Amarilla mi hijo · Morgue · Orsai (Note: The Paraguayan selection committee decided by majority vote not to send any film to the Oscars)
2021	Charlotte
2023	The Apartment · La última obra
2024	Do Not Enter · Just One Spring · The Music Survives

== See also ==
- List of Academy Award winners and nominees for Best International Feature Film
- List of Academy Award-winning foreign language films
- Paraguayan film industry
