= 51st International Film Festival Rotterdam =

2022 edition of IFFR

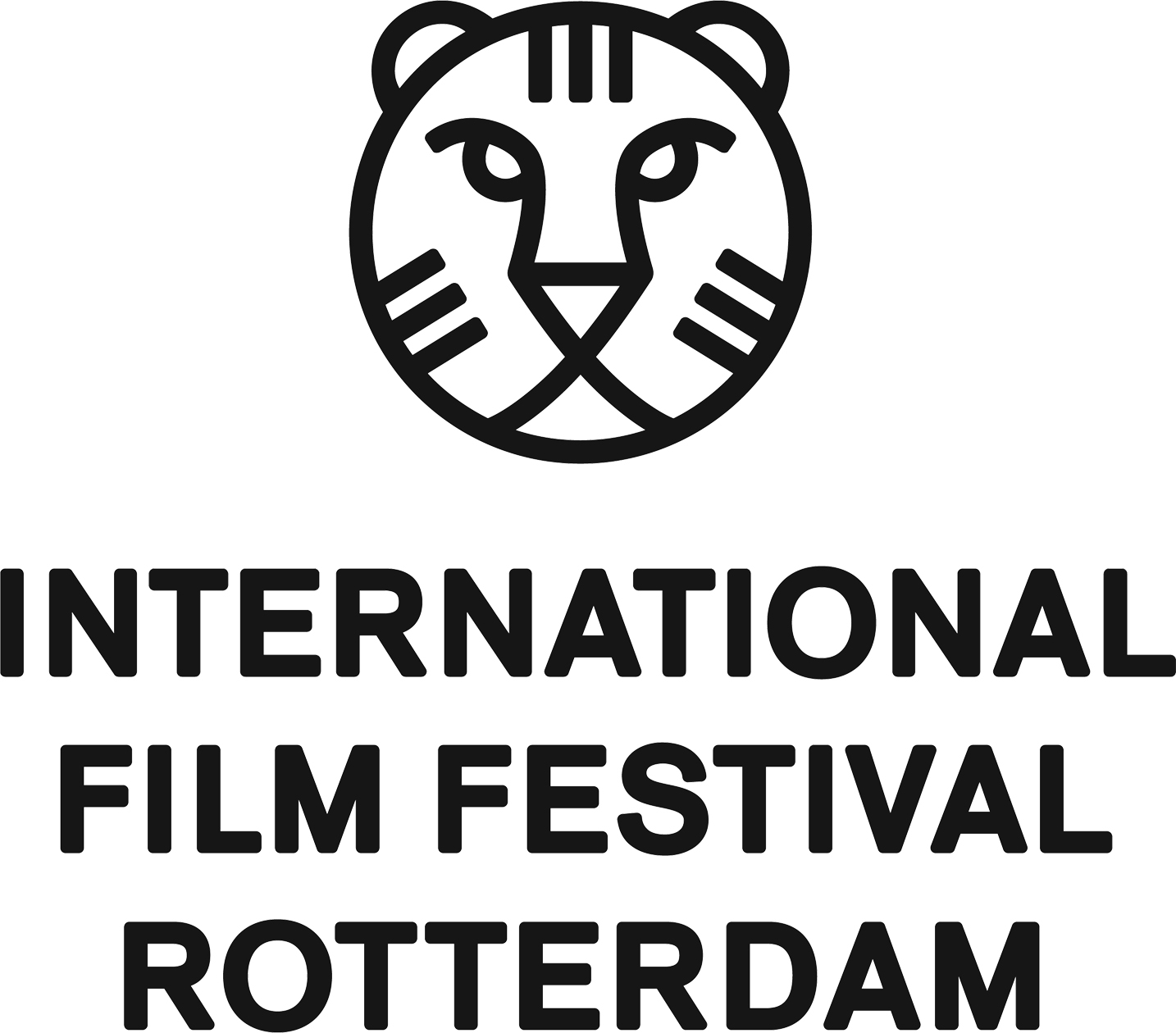
- Logo
- Opening film: Please Baby Please by Amanda Kramer
- Closing film: Dragon Inn by King Hu
- Location: Rotterdam, Netherlands
- Founded: 1972
- Awards: Tiger Award: EAMI by Paz Encina; Robby Müller Award: Sayombhu Mukdeeprom
- Festival date: Opening: 26 January 2022; Closing: 6 February 2022
- Website: IFFR

International Film Festival Rotterdam
- 2024 2021

The 51st International Film Festival Rotterdam, is the 2022 edition of the International Film Festival Rotterdam, which took place online from 26 January 2022 to 6 February 2022. The festival, which was held online for the second consecutive year due to the spread of the Omicron variant across Europe, opened with Amanda Kramer's film Please Baby Please. The festival closed with the screening of 1967 sword fighting classic Dragon Inn by King Hu on 6 February 2022.

== Jury ==
=== Tiger ===
- Farid Tabarki: (Amsterdam) Founder of Studio Zeitgeist, Researcher, international keynote speaker, writer of 'The end of the middle and world traveler. based in .
- Gust Van den Berghe: Brussels-based writer and director with background in theatre, opera and dance.
- Tatiana Leite: (Brazil), Graduate in Law and Communication from PUC-RJ University, postgraduate in Film at UNESA and in History of Art at Sorbonne. A film programmer at the Rio Film Festival from 2000 till 2009, in 2010 she became the International Adviser of the Rio de Janeiro State Secretariat of Culture. In the end of 2012 she created the production company Bubbles Project.
- Thekla Reuten: (Netherlands), a European actress
- Zsuzsi Bankuti: Film festivals organizer and director of the cinema programme

=== Ammodo Tiger Short ===
- Nduka Mntambo: An image-maker, working in the interstices of urban spatial practices, experimental filmmaking, and pedagogy.
- Rieke Vos: A curator and writer based in Amsterdam who works in a cross-disciplinary field of art, popular culture, architecture, and urban life.
- Tim Leyendekker: (Netherlands) Dutch visual artist, filmmaker and photographer

=== Big Screen Award ===
- Louk Haffmans
- Alex Spaanderman
- Eva Langerak
- Karen Kroese
- Mylaine Roelofs

== Official selection ==
=== Opening and closing films ===
English title	Original title	Director(s)	Production countrie(s)
Opening film
Please Baby Please		Amanda Kramer	United States
Stranger Than Rotterdam with Sara Driver		Lewie Kloster, Noah Kloster	United States
Closing film
Dragon Inn	Long men kezhan	King Hu	Taiwan

=== Tiger ===
The following films are selected to compete for the Tiger Award. The line-up was announced on 7 January 2022.

Highlighted title indicates award winner.

English title	Original title	Director(s)	Production countrie(s)
Achrome		Maria Ignatenko	Russia
The Child	A Criança	Marguerite de Hillerin, Félix Dutilloy-Liégeois	Portugal
The Cloud Messenger	Meghdoot	Rahat Mahajan	India
EAMI		Paz Encina	Paraguay, Germany, Argentina, Netherlands, France, United States
Excess Will Save Us		Morgane Dziurla-Petit	Sweden
Kafka for Kids		Roee Rosen	Israel
Malintzin 17		Mara Polgovsky, Eugenio Polgovsky	Mexico
Met mes		Sam de Jong	Netherlands
The Plains		David Easteal	Australia
Phantom Proyect	Proyecto Fantasma	Roberto Doveris	Chile
The Dream and the Radio	Le rêve et la radio	Renaud Després-Larose, Ana Tapia Rousiouk	Canada
Silver Bird and Rainbow Fish		Lei Lei	United States, Netherlands
To Love Again		Gao Linyang	China
Yamabuki		Yamasaki Juichiro	Japan, France

=== Big Screen ===
The following films are selected to compete for the VPRO Big Screen Award.

Highlighted title indicates award winner

English title	Original title	Director(s)	Production countrie(s)
Assault		Adilkhan Yerzhanov	Kazakhstan, Russia
Broadway		Christos Massalas	Greece, France, Romania
CE2		Jacques Doillon	France
Daryn’s Gym		Brett Michael Innes	South Africa
Drifting Petals		Clara Law	Australia
The Island		Anca Damian	Romania
Kung Fu Zohra		Mabrouk El Mechri	France
My Emptiness and I	Mi vacío y yo	Adrián Silvestre	Spain
Splendid Isolation		Urszula Antoniak	Netherlands

=== Ammodo Tiger Short ===
The following films were selected to compete for the Ammodo Tiger Short Competition.

Highlighted title indicates award winner

English title	Original title	Director(s)	Production countrie(s)
Answering the Sun		Rainer Kohlberger	Austria, Germany
Becoming Male in the Middle Ages		Pedro Neves Marques	Portugal
Chants from a Holy Book		Cesar Gananian, Cassiana Der Haroutiounian	Brazil
Constant		Sasha Litvintseva, Beny Wagner	Germany, United Kingdom
Dawn		Leonor Noivo	Portugal
Glass Life		Sara Cwynar	United States
Isn't It a Beautiful World		Joseph Wilson	United Kingdom
The Making of Crime Scenes		Hsu Che-yu	France, Taiwan
Nazarbazi		Maryam Tafakory	Iran
The Name of Things	El nombre de las cosas	Diego Escobar	Chile
Nosferasta: First Bite		Bayley Sweitzer, Adam Khalil	United States
Polycephaly in D		Michael Robinson	United States
Punctured Sky		Jon Rafman	United States
Songs for living		Korakrit Arunanondchai, Alex Gvojic	United States, Thailand
Tomorrow Is a Water Palace		Juanita Onzaga	Belgium
Urban Solutions		Arne Hector, Luciana Mazeto, Vinícius Lopes, Minze Tummescheit	Germany, Brazil

=== Bright Future ===
The programme will highlight first-feature films from promising filmmakers.

English title	Original title	Director(s)	Production countrie(s)
As in Heaven	Du som er i himlen	Tea Lindeburg	Denmark
Brotherhood		Francesco Montagner	Czech Republic
They Carry Death	Eles transportan a morte	Helena Girón, Samuel M. Delgado	Spain
Inmotep		Julián Génisson	Spain
Kim Min-young of the Report Card	성적표의 김민영	Lee Jae-eun, Lim Ji-seon	South Korea
The Last Ride of the Wolves		Alberto De Michele	Netherlands
The Plains		David Easteal	Australia
Zalava		Arsalan Amiri	Iran

=== Cinema Regained ===
The programme offers restored classic films, documentaries on film culture and explorations of cinema's heritage.

English title	Original title	Director(s)	Year	Production countrie(s)
Every Week Seven Days		Eduard Grečner	1964	Czechoslovakia
Ida Lupino: Gentlemen & Miss Lupino		Julia Kuperberg, Clara Kuperberg	2021	France
	Inferno rosso: Joe D'Amato sulla via dell'eccesso	Manlio Gomarasca, Massimiliano Zanin	2021	Italy
Korean Ghost Story – Ieodo		Choi Sangsik	1979	South Korea
The Lady from Constantinople	Sziget a szárazföldön	Judit Elek	1969	Hungary
Modern Korea: The Age of Beasts		Jeong Jaeeun	2021	South Korea
The Nine Lakh Stars		Loubna Régragui	2022	France
Urf		Geetika Narang Abbasi	2022	India
Journey into the Twilight	Viaggio nel crepuscolo	Augusto Contento	2021	Italy

=== Harbour ===
The programme will showcase contemporary cinema.

English title	Original title	Director(s)	Production countrie(s)
The Alleys	Al-Hara	Bassel Ghandour	Jordan
Amrus Natalsya Who Recreates the Dispossessed in Twilight		Mahardhika Yudha	Indonesia
Anatomy of Time	Wela	Jakrawal Nilthamrong	Thailand, France, Singapore, Netherlands
Barbarian Invasion		Tan Chui Mui	Malaysia
Crescent Night	Adh Chanani Raat	Gurvinder Singh	India
The Hole	Il buco	Michelangelo Frammartino	Italy
The Execution	Казнь	Lado Kvataniya	Russia
The Great Movement	El Gran Movimiento	Kiro Russo	Bolivia
Hit the Road	Jadde Khaki	Panah Panahi	Iran
Kinorama – Beyond the Walls of the Real	Kinorama - Cinema Fora De Órbita	Edgar Pêra	Portugal
Let Me Hear It Barefoot		Kudo Riho	Japan
Malik		Mahesh Narayanan	India
Medea	Медея	Alexander Zeldovich	Russia
Medusa		Anita Rocha da Silveira	Brazil
Our Men	Mon Légionnaire	Rachel Lang	France
The Dead Remain With Their Mouth Open	I morti rimangono con la bocca aperta	Fabrizio Ferraro	Italy
Prayers for the Stolen	Noche de fuego	Tatiana Huezo	Mexico
Special Delivery	Teuk-song	Park Dae-Min	South Korea
On the Job: The Missing 8		Erik Matti	Philippines
Who's Stopping Us?	Quién lo impide	Jonás Trueba	Spain

=== Limelight ===
The programme will showcase cinematic highlights of film festival favourites and international award-winners.

English title	Original title	Director(s)	Production countrie(s)
Ali & Ava		Clio Barnard	United Kingdom
Drive My Car	ドライブ・マイ・カー	Ryusuke Hamaguchi	Japan
Happening	L'événement	Audrey Diwan	France
France		Bruno Dumont	France
Freaks Out		Gabriele Mainetti	Italy
Love After Love	第一炉香	Ann Hui	China
Memoria		Apichatpong Weerasethakul	Colombia
Vortex		Gaspar Noé	France
The Worst Person in the World	Verdens verste menneske	Joachim Trier	Norway

=== Short & Mid-length ===
The programmes highlight mid-length films and short films.

Year	English title	Original title	Director(s)	Production countrie(s)
2014	(sans)(image)		arc	United States
2012	the arc of the sun		arc	United States
2017	ascensions		arc	United States
2021	breathing		arc	United States
2018	broken symmetry		arc	United States
2016	conical signal		arc	United States
2013	For the Birds		Stanya Kahn	United States
2018	Friends in Low Places		Stanya Kahn	United States
2011	Happy Song for You		Stanya Kahn, Llyn Foulkes	United States
2022	Stranger Than Rotterdam with Sara Driver		Lewie Kloster, Noah Kloster	United States

== Awards ==
Winner(s)	Work/ director	Notes	Ref.
Robby Müller Award
Sayombhu Mukdeeprom Cinematographer (Thailand)		Honoured	
Tiger Award
EAMI	Paz Encina	Won	
Special Jury Awards
Excess Will Save Us	Morgane Dziurla-Petit	Won	
To Love Again	Gao Linyang	Won	
VPRO Big Screen award
Kung Fu Zohra	Mabrouk El Mechri	Won	
Fipresci award
To Love Again	Gao Linyang	Won	
Ammodo Tiger short awards
Becoming Male in the Middle Ages	Pedro Neves Marques	Won	
Nazarbazi	Maryam Tafakory	Won	
Nosferasta: First Bite	Bayley Sweitzer, Adam Khalil	Won	
KNF award
Punctured Sky	Jon Rafman	Won	
Wanted: VPRO Big Screen public jury
Kung Fu Zohra	Mabrouk El Mechri	Won	
