= List of submissions to the 88th Academy Awards for Best Foreign Language Film =

2015 Best Foreign Language Film submissions
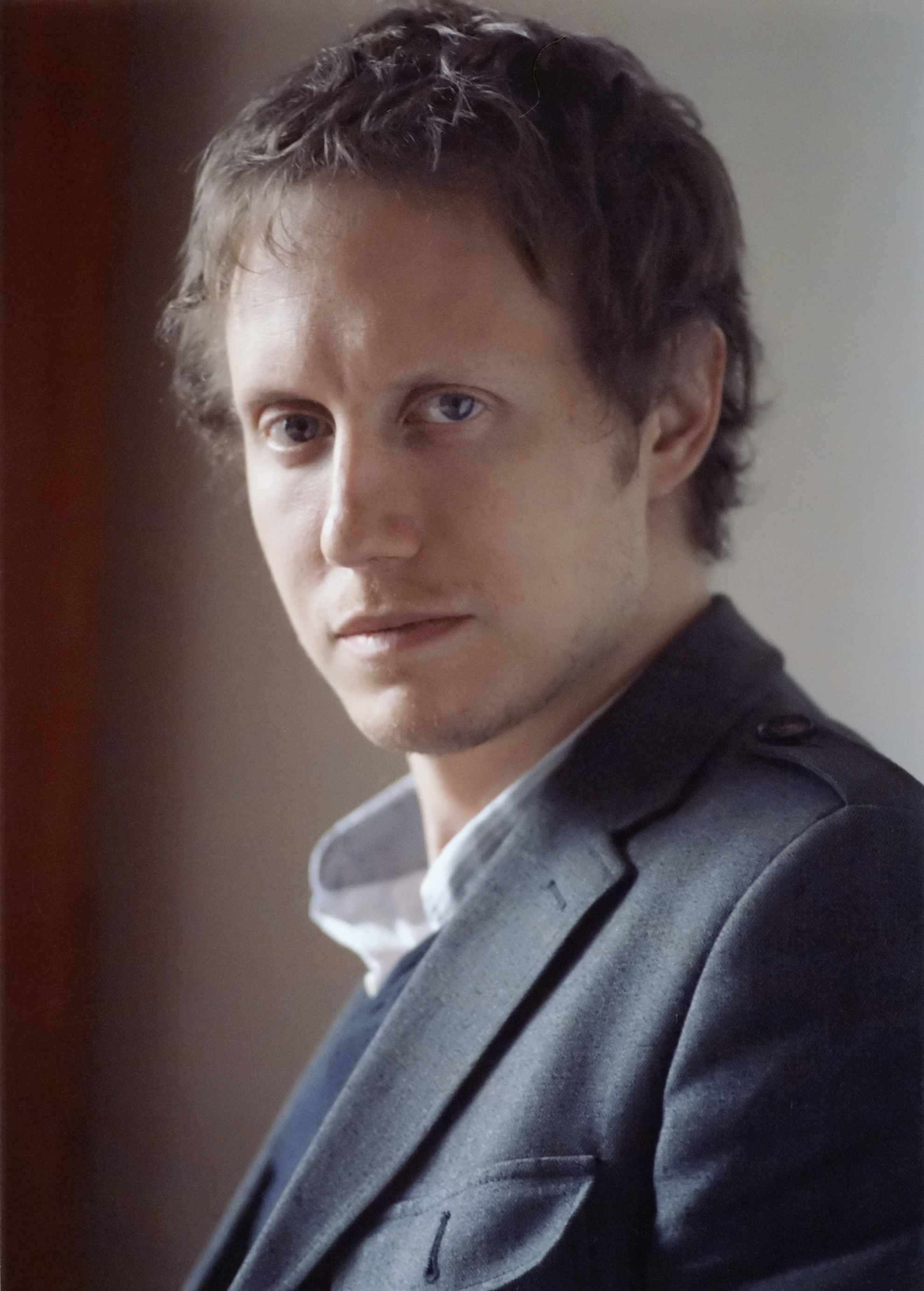
- László Nemes directed Son of Saul, which won the year's award.

Highlights
- Oscar winner: (Hungary) Son of Saul
- Submissions: 82
- Debuts: 1
- Total eligible: 81

This is a list of submissions to the 88th Academy Awards for the Best Foreign Language Film. The Academy of Motion Picture Arts and Sciences (AMPAS) has invited the film industries of various countries to submit their best film for the Academy Award for Best Foreign Language Film every year since the award was created in 1956. The award is presented annually by the Academy to a feature-length motion picture produced outside the United States that contains primarily non-English dialogue. The Foreign Language Film Award Committee oversees the process and reviews all the submitted films.

For the 88th Academy Awards, the submitted motion pictures must have first been released theatrically in their respective countries between 1 October 2014 and 30 September 2015. The deadline for submissions to the Academy was 1 October 2015. 82 countries submitted films, and 81 were found to be eligible by AMPAS and screened for voters. Paraguay submitted a film for the first time. After the 9-film shortlist was announced on 17 December 2014, the five nominees were announced on 14 January 2015.

Hungary won the award for the second time with Son of Saul by László Nemes.

== Submissions ==
Submitting country	Film title used in nomination	Original title	Language(s)	Director(s)	Result
Afghanistan	Utopia	آرمان شهر	English, Dari, Hindi, Persian	Hassan Nazer	Disqualified
Albania	Bota		Albanian, Italian	Iris Elezi and Thomas Logoreci	Not nominated
Algeria	Twilight of Shadows	غروب الظلال / Crépuscule des ombres	Arabic, French	Mohammed Lakhdar-Hamina	Not nominated
Argentina	The Clan	El clan	Spanish	Pablo Trapero	Not nominated
Australia	Arrows of the Thunder Dragon		Dzongkha	Greg Sneddon	Not nominated
Austria	Goodnight Mommy	Ich seh, ich seh	German	Severin Fiala and Veronika Franz	Not nominated
Bangladesh	Jalal's Story	জালালের গল্প	Bengali	Abu Shahed Emon	Not nominated
Belgium	The Brand New Testament	Le tout nouveau testament	French	Jaco Van Dormael	Made shortlist
Bosnia and Herzegovina	Our Everyday Life	Naša svakodnevna priča	Bosnian	Ines Tanović	Not nominated
Brazil	The Second Mother	Que Horas Ela Volta?	Brazilian Portuguese	Anna Muylaert	Not nominated
Bulgaria	The Judgment	Съдилището	Bulgarian	Stephan Komandarev	Not nominated
Cambodia	The Last Reel	ដុំហ្វីលចុងក្រោយ	Khmer	Kulikar Sotho	Not nominated
Canada	Felix and Meira	Félix et Meira	French, Yiddish, English, Spanish, Hebrew, Italian	Maxime Giroux	Not nominated
Chile	The Club	El club	Spanish	Pablo Larraín	Not nominated
China	Go Away Mr. Tumor	滚蛋吧！肿瘤君	Mandarin, English, Korean	Han Yan	Not nominated
Colombia	Embrace of the Serpent	El abrazo de la serpiente	Ocaina, Cubeo, German, Minica Huitoto, Bora, Andoque, Yucuna, Muinane, Spanish, Ticuna, Wanano, Catalan, Brazilian Portuguese, Latin, English	Ciro Guerra	Nominated
Costa Rica	Presos		Spanish	Esteban Ramírez	Not nominated
Croatia	The High Sun	Zvizdan	Croatian, Serbian	Dalibor Matanić	Not nominated
Czech Republic	Home Care	Domácí péče	Czech	Slávek Horák	Not nominated
Denmark	A War	Krigen	Danish, Pashto, Arabic, English	Tobias Lindholm	Nominated
Dominican Republic	Sand Dollars	Dólares de arena	Spanish, English, French	Laura Amelia Guzmán and Israel Cárdenas	Not nominated
Estonia	1944		Estonian, Russian, German	Elmo Nüganen	Not nominated
Ethiopia	Lamb		Amharic	Yared Zeleke	Not nominated
Finland	The Fencer	Miekkailija	Estonian, Russian	Klaus Härö	Made shortlist
France	Mustang		Turkish	Deniz Gamze Ergüven	Nominated
Georgia	Moira	მოირა	Georgian, Greek	Levan Tutberidze	Not nominated
Germany	Labyrinth of Lies	Im Labyrinth des Schweigens	German, English, Hebrew	Giulio Ricciarelli	Made shortlist
Greece	Xenia	Ξενία	Greek, Albanian, Italian	Panos H. Koutras	Not nominated
Guatemala	Ixcanul		Kaqchikel, Spanish	Jayro Bustamante	Not nominated
Hong Kong	To the Fore	破風	Mandarin, Cantonese, English, Italian, Korean	Dante Lam	Not nominated
Hungary	Son of Saul	Saul fia	Hungarian, Yiddish, German, Polish, Russian, Slovak, Czech, Greek, Hebrew	László Nemes	Won Academy Award
Iceland	Rams	Hrútar	Icelandic	Grímur Hákonarson	Not nominated
India	Court	कोर्ट	Marathi, Hindi, Gujarati, English	Chaitanya Tamhane	Not nominated
Iran	Muhammad: The Messenger of God	محمد رسول‌الله	Persian, Arabic, Hebrew, Aramaic	Majid Majidi	Not nominated
Iraq	Memories on Stone	بیرەوەرییەکانی سەر بەرد / Bîranînen li ser kevirî	Northern Kurdish, Arabic, Persian	Shawkat Amin Korki	Not nominated
Ireland	Viva		Spanish	Paddy Breathnach	Made shortlist
Israel	Baba Joon	באבא ג'ון / بابا جون	Persian, Hebrew, English	Yuval Delshad	Not nominated
Italy	Don't Be Bad	Non essere cattivo	Italian, Romanesco	Claudio Caligari	Not nominated
Ivory Coast	Run		French, Dyula, English	Philippe Lacôte	Not nominated
Japan	100 Yen Love	百円の恋	Japanese	Masaharu Take	Not nominated
Jordan	Theeb	ذيب	Arabic, English, Turkish	Naji Abu Nowar	Nominated
Kazakhstan	Stranger	Жат	Kazakh	Ermek Tursunov	Not nominated
Kosovo	Babai		Albanian, German, Serbian, English, Italian	Visar Morina	Not nominated
Kyrgyzstan	Heavenly Nomadic	Сутак	Kyrgyz	Mirlan Abdykalykov	Not nominated
Latvia	Modris		Latvian, Russian	Juris Kursietis	Not nominated
Lebanon	Void	وينن	Arabic	Tarek Korkomaz, Zeina Makki, Jad Beyrouthy, Christelle Ighniades, Salim Habr, Maria Abdel Karim, and Naji Bechara	Not nominated
Lithuania	The Summer of Sangailė	Sangailės vasara	Lithuanian	Alantė Kavaitė	Not nominated
Luxembourg	Baby(a)lone		Luxembourgish	Donato Rotunno	Not nominated
(North Macedonia) Macedonia	Honey Night	Медена ноќ	Macedonian	Ivo Trajkov	Not nominated
Malaysia	Men Who Save the World	Lelaki Harapan Dunia	Malay	Liew Seng Tat	Not nominated
Mexico	600 Miles	600 millas	Spanish, English	Gabriel Ripstein	Not nominated
Montenegro	You Carry Me	Ti mene nosiš	Croatian	Ivona Juka	Not nominated
Morocco	Aida	عايدة	Arabic, Hebrew, French	Driss Mrini	Not nominated
Nepal	Talakjung vs Tulke	टलकजंग भर्सेस टुल्के	Nepali	Nischal Basnet	Not nominated
Netherlands	The Paradise Suite		Bulgarian, Swedish, French, Bosnian, Serbian, Dutch, English, Russian	Joost van Ginkel	Not nominated
Norway	The Wave	Bølgen	Norwegian, Danish	Roar Uthaug	Not nominated
Pakistan	Moor	ماں, مور	Urdu, Pashto	Jamshed Mahmood Raza	Not nominated
Palestine	The Wanted 18	المطلوبون 18	Arabic, English, Hebrew	Paul Cowan and Amer Shomali	Not nominated
Panama	Box 25	Caja 25	Spanish	Mercedes Arias and Delfina Vidal	Not on the final list
Paraguay	Cloudy Times	El tiempo nublado	Spanish, English, German	Arami Ullon	Not nominated
Peru	NN	NN: sin identidad	Spanish	Héctor Gálvez	Not nominated
Philippines	Heneral Luna		Filipino, English, Spanish, French, Kinaray-a, Hiligaynon	Jerrold Tarog	Not nominated
Poland	11 Minutes	11 minut	Polish, English	Jerzy Skolimowski	Not nominated
Portugal	Arabian Nights: Volume 2 - The Desolate One	As Mil e Uma Noites: Volume 2 - O Desolado	Portuguese, English, French, German, Mandarin	Miguel Gomes	Not nominated
Romania	Aferim!		Romanian, Vlax Romani, Turkish	Radu Jude	Not nominated
Russia	Sunstroke	Солнечный удар	Russian, French	Nikita Mikhalkov	Not nominated
Serbia	Enclave	Енклава	Serbian, Albanian, German, Italian, Croatian	Goran Radovanović	Not nominated
Singapore	7 Letters		Malay, Singaporean Hokkien, Mandarin, Malayalam, Cantonese, Tamil, English, Teochew Min	Boo Junfeng, Eric Khoo, Jack Neo, K. Rajagopal, Tan Pin Pin, Royston Tan, and Kelvin Tong	Not nominated
Slovakia	Goat	Koza	Slovak, Czech, German, English	Ivan Ostrochovský	Not nominated
Slovenia	The Tree	Drevo	Slovene, Albanian	Sonja Prosenc	Not nominated
South Africa	The Two of Us	Thina Sobabili	Zulu	Ernest Nkosi	Not nominated
South Korea	The Throne	사도	Korean	Lee Joon-ik	Not nominated
Spain	Flowers	Loreak	Basque	Jon Garaño and Jose Mari Goenaga	Not nominated
Sweden	A Pigeon Sat on a Branch Reflecting on Existence	En duva satt på en gren och funderade över tillvaron	Swedish	Roy Andersson	Not nominated
Switzerland	Iraqi Odyssey		Arabic, English, German, Russian	Samir	Not nominated
Taiwan	The Assassin	刺客聶隱娘	Mandarin	Hou Hsiao-hsien	Not nominated
Thailand	How to Win at Checkers (Every Time)	พี่ชาย My Hero	Thai	Josh Kim	Not nominated
Turkey	Sivas		Turkish	Kaan Müjdeci	Not nominated
United Kingdom	Under Milk Wood	Dan y Wenallt	Welsh, English	Kevin Allen	Not nominated
Uruguay	A Moonless Night	Una noche sin luna	Spanish	Germán Tejeira	Not nominated
Venezuela	Gone with the River	Dauna. Lo que lleva el río	Warao, Spanish	Mario Crespo	Not nominated
Vietnam	Jackpot	Trúng số	Vietnamese	Dustin Nguyen	Not nominated

== Notes ==
- Afghanistan originally submitted Utopia by Hassan Nazer. The submission was on the official list, but it was disqualified a few days prior to its Academy screening for having too much dialogue in English. The Afghan filmmakers union tried to appeal, bringing the language breakdown by minutes, but they were unsuccessful.
- China's submission was originally reported as being Wolf Totem by Jean-Jacques Annaud, but this was changed to Go Away Mr. Tumor by Han Yan when the final list was released.
- Cuba announced that it had convened a selection committee which decided by majority vote not to send a film to the Oscars.
- The Nigerian Oscar Selection Committee (NOSC) asked for films to be submitted by 6 July 2015. Nigeria planned to submit a film for the first time last year, but ultimately no entries were eligible.
- Panama reportedly submitted Box 25 by Mercedes Arias and Delfina Vidal, but the film was not on the final list.
- Ukraine missed the deadline to submit a film, but requested an extension from the Academy.
