= The Gold Seekers =

- Film poster
- Directed by: Juan Carlos Maneglia; Tana Schembori
- Written by: Juan Carlos Maneglia; Mario González Martí
- Produced by: Christian Chena
- Starring: Tomás Arredondo; Mario Toñanez; Christian Ferreira; Cecilia Torres; Sandra “Sifri” Sanabria
- Cinematography: Richard Careaga
- Edited by: Alfredo Galeano
- Music by: Derlis A. González
- Distributed by: FilmSharks Intl. (world sales rights)
- Release date: 7 September 2017
- Running time: 102 minutes
- Country: Paraguay
- Languages: Spanish; Guarani

The Gold Seekers (Spanish: Los Buscadores) is a 2017 Paraguayan adventure comedy film directed by Juan Carlos Maneglia and Tana Schembori. It is the follow-up to their 2012 film 7 Boxes. It was selected as the Paraguayan entry for the Best Foreign Language Film at the 90th Academy Awards, but it was not nominated.

== Cast ==
- Tomás Arredondo as Manu
- Cecilia Torres as Ilu
- Christian Ferreira as Fito
- Mario Toñanez as Don Elio
- Sandra Sanabria as Lili
- Jesús Pérez
- Amada Gómez
- Nelly Dávalos
- Leticia Sosa
- Jorge Fernández
- Martín Oviedo
- Mario González Martí
- Rodrigo Caballero

== Plot ==
Manu, a 21-year-old newspaper boy, discovers a map in a book gifted by his treasure hunting grandfather. Believing the map points to treasure buried during the Paraguayan War, he finds the site is now an embassy and decides to infiltrate it.

== Production ==
=== Development ===
From May to September 2016 there were 63 days of filming distributed between the Chacarita neighborhood and the Asunción microcenter. In addition, the recording was moved to some locations in the city of Paraguarí, located 66 kilometers from the Paraguayan capital. The development of "The Seekers" took about three years from the moment in which Juan Carlos Maneglia, scriptwriter and director of the film, began to work on the first sketches of history.

=== Script ===
To write the script, Maneglia immersed herself in a long investigation that began in 2014, when she traveled to the interior of the country to interview "plata yvyguy" (treasures buried during the Paraguayan War) seekers. During the writing process, the material was corrected by Fernando Castets from Buenos Aires, scriptwriter of the Argentine film "El hijo de la novia". The script was developed in collaboration with Mario González Martí and the comments of Paraguayan audiovisual producers, such as Alicia Guerra, Sergio Colmán Meixner, Maribel Bosio, Tito Chamorro and Marcelo Tolces, among several others.

=== Post-production ===
During the month of July 2017, the team moved to Buenos Aires (Argentina). Maneglia traveled accompanied by the editor Alfredo Galeano and the special effects manager Walter Piccardo to work on the Scratch color correction, with the specialist Georgina Pretto, at the Cine Color studios. The mix was made in the Dolby room of Tres Sonidos, studio where the sound director Germán Acevedo worked closely with Gerardo Kalmar, designer and sound mixer.

== Music ==
The National Symphony Orchestra of Paraguay (OSN), with 71 musicians under the special direction of Sergio Cuquejo, recorded the original soundtrack composed of 36 tracks created by Derlis A. González. In the musicalization also collaborated the Band of Musicians of the National Police, the guitarist Berta Rojas, nominated three times to the Latin Grammy awards; Patrick Altamirano, Mauricio Rodas, René Ayala, and Luis Chaparro.

== Reception ==
=== Box office ===
The film premiered in Paraguay, on 7 September 2017, and in its eighth week on the billboard exceeded 130 thousand spectators. It became the second highest grossing film of the year, behind "The Fate of the Furious", with 191 thousand spectators; in the second highest grossing Paraguayan film in history, behind "7 Boxes" (261 thousand spectators); and in the fourth most seen in Paraguay, according to the portal Ultracine.

=== Critical response ===
On review aggregator website Rotten Tomatoes, the film holds an approval rating of 100%, based on 6 reviews, and an average rating of 7.7/10.

Jonathan Holland of The Hollywood Reporter saying that: "Stylistically, The Gold Seekers, its twisting, high-speed follow-up, is more of the same. But this is more explicitly comic, fluffier and more generic family-friendly fare, more knockabout and less focused."

=== Accolades ===
The Gold Seekers received the following nominations:

Award	Date of ceremony	Category	Recipients and nominees	Result	Ref(s)
Palm Springs International Film Festival	13 January 2018	New Voices/New Visions Grand Jury Prize	Juan Carlos Maneglia, Tana Schémbori	Nominated	
Platino Awards	29 April 2018	Best Original Score	Derlis A. González	Nominated	

== See also ==
- List of submissions to the 90th Academy Awards for Best Foreign Language Film
- List of Paraguayan submissions for the Academy Award for Best Foreign Language Film
- Latas Vacias
