= HIFF =

HIFF may refer to:

- Hamptons International Film Festival, East Hampton, New York, US
- Harlem International Film Festival, Harlem, New York, US
- Hawaii International Film Festival, Hawaii, US
- Heartland International Film Festival, Indianapolis, US
- Helsinki International Film Festival, Finland
- Hiroshima International Film Festival, Japan
- Hyderabad International Film Festival, India
