= Marcel Vaid =

Swiss-German composer

Marcel Vaid, 2017 at Festival Jazz Art Sengawa, Tokyo

Marcel Vaid (born 1967) is a Swiss-German musician and composer of music for film and theatre.

== Life and career ==
Born in Erlangen, Germany, Marcel Vaid's father is of Punjabi origin from India. Besides his work as a composer and music producer, he composes music for fiction and documentary films. Marcel Vaid is together with his brother Ravi Vaid also the head of the electro-acoustic experimental collective Superterz.

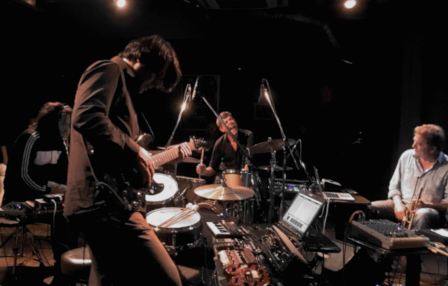
The Band Superterz, 2019 at the Club Pit Inn, Tokyo with (FLR) Ravi Vaid, Marcel Vaid, Simon Berz, Nils Petter Molvaer

He has collaborated with artists such as Nils Petter Molvær, Toshinori Kondo, Kate Havnevik, Mauro Pawlowski, Rodrigo González, Norbert Möslang, Marianne Schroeder, Lauren Newton and Jojo Mayer. In film Marcel Vaid has worked with director Léa Pool, Eliza Kubarska, Carmen Jaquier, Anja Kofmel, Fredi Murer, Esen Işık, Marcus Vetter, Milo Rau, Grzegorz Zgliński, Oliver Paulus, Tommaso Landucci or oscar-nominated Timo von Gunten.

He has received the Swiss Film Prize Quartz four times (Zara 2009, Goodnight Nobody 2011, When the sun fell 2016 and Chris the Swiss 2019), the Prix Fondation Suisa (Tandoori Love 2009), the prize for Best Film Score at the Filmfstivals in Angers (Joshua 2003) and Valencia (Where is Max 2009). In 2012 he received the Zurich City Award (Werkjahr der Stadt Zürich).

In 2022, Marcel Vaid was honored as Composer in Focus of the Zurich Film Festival with a medley of selected works performed by the Zurich Tonhalle Orchestra under the direction of Frank Strobel. According to his own statement, "the examination of acoustic instruments and their spatial processing on the computer is a particular sound-aesthetic concern for him."

Marcel Vaid is a guest lecturer at the Zurich University of the Arts, and gives various master classes. He is a member of the Swiss and European Filmacademy and board member of the Swiss Composers Association SONART, the Swiss Musician's Association.

== Filmography (selected work) ==
=== Feature films ===
- 2002 Joshua by Andreas Müller
- 2003 At Parish by Yaël Parish
- 2006 First Love, Last Rites by Susanne Kaelin
- 2007 The Illettrist by Oliver Paulus, Stefan Hillebrand
- 2008 Zara by Ayten Mutlu Saray
- 2008 Der Freund, in collaboration with Sophie Hunger, by Micha Lewinsky
- 2008 Tandoori Love by Oliver Paulus
- 2008 Un día y nada by Lorenz Merz
- 2008 Wo ist Max? by Juri Steinhart
- 2009 Die Standesbeamtin, in collaboration with Markus Schönholzer, by Micha Lewinsky
- 2010 Bon Appétit by David Pinillos
- 2010 Sommervögel by Paul Riniker
- 2012 Poupée by Timo Von Gunten
- 2012 Dreamgirl by Oliver Schwarz
- 2013 Cherry Pie by Lorenz Merz
- 2013 Sitting Next To Zoe by Ivana Lalovic
- 2013 Keep Rollin', in collaboration with Rodrigo González, by Oliver Paulus, Stefan Hillebrand
- 2014 Controlling And Punishment by Ayten Mutlu Saray, Ridha Tlili
- 2014 Now or Never by Fredi Murer
- 2015 Köpek by Esen Isik
- 2015 Usfahrt Oerlike by Paul Riniker
- 2017 La Fuga by Sandra Vannucchi (replaced Theo Teardo)
- 2017 Lasst die Alten sterben by Juri Steinhart (new composer)
- 2018 Level Up Your Life, in collaboration with Jochen Doc Wenz, by Oliver Paulus, Stefan Hillebrand
- 2019 Al-Shafaq – When Heaven Divides by Esen Isik
- 2020 Eating the Silence by Joël Louis Jent, Ali Al-Fatlawi
- 2020 Of Fish and Men by Stefanie Klemm
- 2021 The Sphere by Manuel Šumberac
- 2022 Semret by Caterina Mona
- 2022 Euridice von Lora Mure-Ravaud
- 2023 Unter Wasser kann man nicht schreien by Georg Isenmann
- 2023 7 Fois by Christine Wiederkehr
- 2024 Les paradis de Diane by Carmen Jaquier, Jan Gassmann
- 2024 South of Hope Street by Jane Spencer
- 2024 Bernadette will töten by Oliver Paulus, Robert Herzl
- 2024 Al Baseer – Der blinde Fährmann by Ali Al-Fatlawi
- 2024 Don’t Let The Sun (Catch You Crying) by Jacqueline Zünd

=== Documentary films ===
- 2009 Dachkantine by Nicole Biermaier, Ravi Vaid
- 2010 Guru – Bhagwan, His Secretary & His Bodyguard by Sabine Gisiger, Beat Häner
- 2010 Goodnight Nobody by Jacqueline Zünd
- 2010 Hüllen by Maria Müller
- 2011 Das Geheimnis unseres Waldes by Heikko Böhm
- 2011 Marc Ristori d'une seconde à l'autre by Benjamin Tobler
- 2011 The Substance – Albert Hoffmans LSD by Martin Witz
- 2012 Bernard Bovet, le vieil homme à la caméra by Nasser Bakhti
- 2012 Forbidden Voices by Barbara Miller
- 2013 My Name Is Salt by Farida Pacha
- 2013 The Green Serpent by Benny Jaberg
- 2014 El tiempo nublado by Arami Ullón
- 2014 ThuleTuvalu by Matthias von Gunten
- 2015 Als die Sonne vom Himmel fiel by Aya Domenig
- 2016 Staatenlos, in collaboration with André Bellmont, by Erich Schmid
- 2017 The Kongo Tribunal by Milo Rau
- 2017 Double Sentence by Léa Pool
- 2018 Chris the Swiss by Anja Kofmel
- 2019 The Forum by Marcus Vetter
- 2019 Golden Age by Beat Oswald, Samuel Weniger
- 2019 Gateways to New York – Othmar H. Ammann and His Bridges by Martin Witz
- 2020 The Wall of Shadows by Eliza Kubarska
- 2020 Not Me – A Journey with Not Vital by Pascal Hofmann
- 2020 Unter einem Dach by Maria Müller
- 2021 Ostrov – Lost Island by Svetlana Rodina, Laurent Stoop
- 2021 Caveman – The Hidden Giant by Tommaso Landucci
- 2022 Dear Memories by Nahuel Lopez
- 2022 Do you remember me by Desirée Pomper, Helena Müller
- 2024 Bergfahrt' by Dominique Margot
- 2024 Der Eismann by Corina Gamma
- 2024 The Last Expedition by Eliza Kubarska
- 2024 DOM (Home) by Svetlana Rodina, Laurent Stoop

=== Television ===
- 2004 Das Paar im Kahn by Marie-Louise Bless
- 2004 Voyage contre la faim by Matthias von Gunten
- 2006 Flanke ins All by Marie-Louise Bless
- 2011 Vater, unser Wille geschehe by Robert Ralston Jr.
- 2015 Undine Gruenter - Le projet d'aimer by Anita Hugi
- 2015 Au coeur des Robots by Bruno Victor-Pujubet
- 2015 Auf den Spuren des Odysseus von Roger Brunner, Lisa Röösli, Dave Leins
- 2017 Entlang der Gewürzroute von Roger Brunner, Lisa Röösli, Dave D. Leins, Beat Häner
- 2017 My unknown Russia (4 episodes) by Roger Brunner, Lisa Röösli, Dave D. Leins
- 2018 My unknown America (4 episodes) by Roger Brunner, Lisa Röösli, Dave D. Leins, Beat Häner
- 2019 Dynastie Knie – 100 Years Nationalcircus by Greg Zglinski
- 2020 Ursus & Nadeschkin – Aufhören wäre einfach by Stefan Jäger
- 2020 My other China (4 episodes) by Roger Brunner, Lisa Röösli, Dave D. Leins, Beat Häner
- 2021 Stille über Fukushima by Aya Domenig
- 2021 Il demolitore di camper by Robert Ralston Jr.
- 2021 The Pianist who came in from the cold – Sergey Tanin by Helen Stehli Pfister
- 2022 Tatort – Schattenkinder by Christine Repond
- 2022 Tatort – Risiken mit Nebenwirkungen by Christine Repond
- 2022 Heidi's Nightmare by Anita Hugi
- 2023 Alter Ego (6 episodes) by Erik Bernasconi, Robert Ralston Jr., in collaboration with Zeno Gabaglio
- 2023 Davos 1917 (6 episodes) by Jan-Eric Mack, Anca Miruna Lazarescu, Christian Theede, in collaboration with Adrian Frutiger
- 2023 Taiwan – Chinas Drohung an die Welt von Dave D. Leins

== Awards ==
- 2003 Winner Prix de la Création musicale, European First Film Festival, Angers in Joshua
- 2009 Winner Swiss Filmprize Quartz Best Filmscore in Zara
- 2009 Winner Best Filmmusic, Filmfestival La Cabina, Valencia, in Wo ist Max?
- 2009 Winner Best Filmmusic Prix Fondation Suisa at the Internationalen Filmfestival Locarno in Tandoori Love
- 2011 Nomination Best Filmscore at the 12th International Filmfestival Aubagne, in Goodnight Nobody
- 2011 Winner Swiss Filmprize Quartz Best Filmscore in Goodnight Nobody
- 2012 Winner Werkjahr der Stadt Zürich Jazz/Rock/Pop, shared with Ravi Vaid
- 2016 Nomination Swiss Filmprize Quartz Best Filmscore in Köpek (Doublenomination with Als die Sonne vom Himmel fiel)
- 2016 Winner Swiss Filmprize Quartz Best Filmscore in Als die Sonne vom Himmel fiel
- 2018 Nomination Swiss Filmprize Quartz Best Filmscore in The Kongo Tribunal
- 2018 Nomination Cristal Pine Award Best Original Score in a Documentary in Chris the Swiss
- 2018 Nomination European Animation Award Best Soundtrack in a Feature Film in Chris the Swiss
- 2018 Nomination German Documentary Filmmusik Award 'Best original Score' in Chris the Swiss
- 2019 Winner Swiss Filmprize Quartz Best Filmscore in Chris the Swiss
- 2019 Nomination Swiss Filmprize Quartz Best Filmscore in Not Me – A Journey with Not Vital
