= Baba Joon =

2015 film

- Film poster
- Directed by: Yuval Delshad
- Written by: Yuval Delshad
- Starring: Navid Negahban
- Release date: 9 September 2015
- Running time: 91 minutes
- Country: Israel
- Language: Persian

Baba Joon (Hebrew: באבא ג'ון) is a 2015 Israeli drama film directed by Yuval Delshad, being his directional debut.

The film tells the story of an immigrant family of Iranian descent running a turkey farm. It focuses on the conflict between the father and his son, who refuses to carry on the family farming tradition.

The film had its world premiere in the Contemporary World Cinema section of the 2015 Toronto International Film Festival, as well as 27 other festivals around the world. It won the award for Best Film at the 2015 Ophir Awards and became Israel's entry for the Best Foreign Language Film at the 88th Academy Awards but it was not nominated.

== Plot ==
The film tells the story of a Jewish-Iranian family of three generations in an agricultural settlement in the Negev, where all the inhabitants immigrated from Iran, led by the family patriarch Yitzchak (Navid Negahban). Yitzchak runs a turkey farm that he took over from his father. His 13-year-old son Moti is supposed to take over the business one day, but he is not interested in poultry and would rather become a car mechanic instead. This causes conflict among the family, which intensifies during a visit by the uncle, Dariush (Priborz David Dian), who lives in America after rebelling against his conservative father.

The passive mother of the family (Wiz Elliot Spabby) tries to bridge the gaps between the family members.

== Additional awards ==
- Ophir Award for Best Original Music (Eyal Said Mani)
- Ophir Award for Best Art Direction (Yehuda Eko)
- Ophir Award for Best Casting (Noa Ela)
- Ophir Award for Best Cinematography (Ofer Yanov)
- Ophir Award for Best Feature Film

== Cast ==
- Navid Negahban
- David Diaan
- Viss Elliot Safavi
- Asher Avrahami
- Elias Rafael

== See also ==
- List of submissions to the 88th Academy Awards for Best Foreign Language Film
- List of Israeli submissions for the Academy Award for Best Foreign Language Film
