= Hiroshima International Film Festival =

Annual film festival held in Hiroshima, Japan

The Hiroshima International Film Festival (HIFF), launched as Damah Film Festival in Hiroshima in 2009 and renamed to its present name in 2014, is an annual film festival held in the city of Hiroshima in Japan each November. Its focus is on "positive and inspirational films".

== History ==
The Damah Film Festival, a festival of short films focused on spirituality was established in Seattle, United States, in 2001, before relocating to Culver City, California. Damah is a Hebrew word sometimes translated as "metaphor".

The Damah Film Festival in Hiroshima was held annually from 2009 until 2013, with the theme "Connecting our hearts together", in some years also being presented in Fukuyama.

The inaugural Hiroshima International Film Festival (under its new name and with an expanded program) was held at NTT Cred Hall in Hiroshima City in 2014.

In 2019, the Damah Film Festival began as a separate festival in Tokyo, focusing on short films, with Mayumi Fukuhara as the inaugural director. It continues today, with a 2025 festival planned in the spring. Mark Joseph, co-founder, is president of the festival

== Description ==
It is a three-day film festival held annually in November Hiroshima. Films are submitted from around the world, subtitled in Japanese and English, and the program is bilingual. Its focus is on "positive and inspirational films".

The festival is presented by the Hiroshima Prefecture, Hiroshima City, Hiroshima Chamber of Commerce and Industry, and various other bodies.

== People ==
The president of the festival is production designer Kyoko Heya. Kazutaka Yamamoto is chairman of the executive committee of the festival, while the secretary general of the festival is Hitoshi Kono.

== Past festivals ==
The inaugural Damah Film Festival in Hiroshima in 2009 included past winners of the U.S. festival, new nominees from Asian countries, and a special showing of the thriller The Least of These, executive produced by Ralph Winter. Supported by the Hiroshima Film Commission, the festival relied on around 100 volunteers to stage the event. Prizes awarded were the Hiroshima Grand Prix Award, Jury Award, and Audience Award were elected by audience voting and five jury members.

In 2010, a Competition Division was created.

The 2011 event was affected by the 2011 Tōhoku earthquake and tsunami, and Japanese actor Etsushi Toyokawa was a special guest at the festival.

In 2012, the Chūgoku Region Award was introduced.

In 2014 the inaugural rebranded festival (as Hiroshima International Film Festival) introduced three new competitions and programs: the International Short Film Competition, Special Screenings, the "Hiroshima EYE".

In 2015, the festival took place across four venues in the city, including NTT Cred Hall, Hiroshima City Cinematographic and Audio-Visual Library, Yokogawa Cinema, and Hatchoza, from 20 to 23 November. the Swiss documentary film The Day the Sun Fell by Aya Domenig was presented at the festival. The film links the atomic bombing of Hiroshima and the 2011 Fukushima nuclear accident. Domenig's maternal grandfather was a doctor at the Hiroshima Red Cross Hospital.

In 2018, the festival presented Swiss films selected by the newly created Helvetica Swiss Film Festival.

In 2023, the festival opened with The Village, directed by Michihito Fujii and starring Ryusei Yokohama. Ryusuke Hamaguchi's Evil Does Not Exist had its Japanese premiere at the festival. The short film competition was held for the first time in four years, (Note: Since the Damah festival moved to Tokyo - see history section.) and there was a special program dedicated to Yoji Yamada, who has made many films in Hiroshima Prefecture.
