= Navid Negahban =

Iranian-American actor

- نوید نگهبان
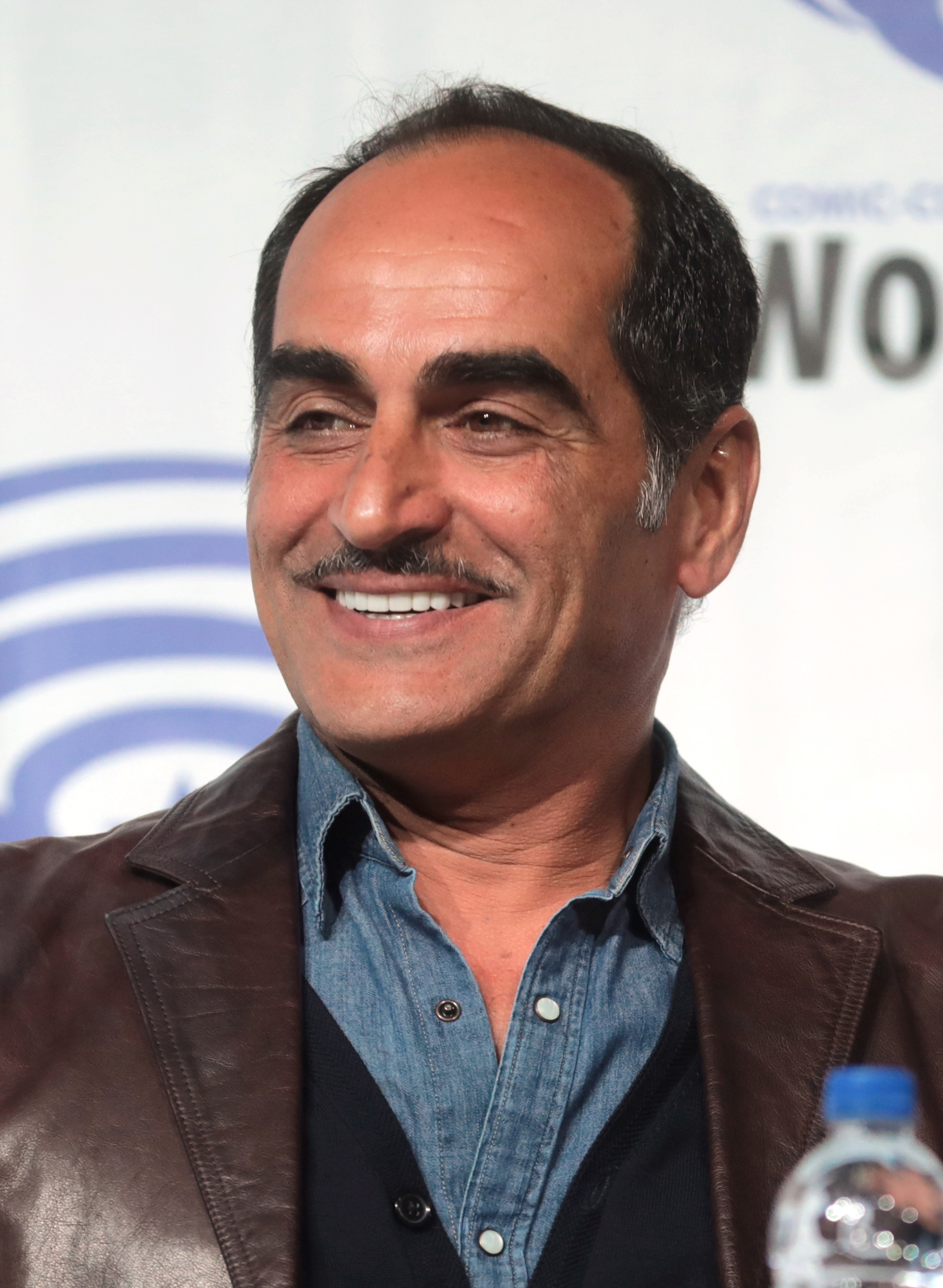
- Negahban at the 2019 WonderCon
- Born: June 2, 1968 (age 58); Mashhad, Khorasan, Imperial State of Iran
- Occupations: Actor; producer; director
- Years active: 1987–present
- Website: navidnegahban.com

Navid Negahban (Persian: نوید نگهبان) is an Iranian-American actor, producer, and director. He has appeared on 24, Homeland, Mistresses, and as Amahl Farouk / Shadow King in the second and third seasons of FX's Legion. He has also starred as the Sultan in the live-action remake of Aladdin, as General Abdul Rashid Dostum in 12 Strong, as Faraz Hamzad in The Old Man, and as Abbas Mansuri in The Night Agent.

== Early life and education ==
Navid Negahban was born in Mashhad, Iran. He took a liking to the theater when he was eight years old, while provoking laughter from a large audience by portraying an old man on stage.

He left Iran in 1985 when he was 17 for Turkey and then Germany, where he spent eight years. In Germany, he worked for a theater company, and then in 1993 he moved to the United States.

He is fluent in English, German, and Persian. He also began learning French for his role on Legion.

== Career ==
He has appeared in The Shield, The West Wing, Lost, and CSI: Miami. He has collaborated twice with Iranian-American actress Necar Zadegan, once in 24, where her on-screen husband ordered his interrogation and the torturing of his family, and also in CSI: Miami, where, as his wife, she killed him.

Negahban also had two collaborations with another Iranian-American actress, Mozhan Marnò, in the TV series The Unit and the movie The Stoning of Soraya M., where he plays the husband of Soraya (Marnò). In 2008, Negahban voiced and provided his likeness to the character Dr. Challus Mercer in the survival horror game Dead Space. Negahban also appeared as terrorist mastermind Abu Nazir in the critically acclaimed TV series Homeland.

In 2011 he won the Best Actor Award for the 2009 Iranian short film, Liberation at the Noor Iranian Film Festival, and in 2012, he returned to serve as an official festival judge. In February 2015, The Hollywood Reporter and Variety confirmed that Negahban had begun shooting the spy thriller, Damascus Cover, based on the novel by Howard Kaplan, alongside Jonathan Rhys Meyers, Olivia Thirlby, and John Hurt. Negahban played the role of Syrian General Sarraj.

He appeared as General Abdul Rashid Dostum in the 2018 war drama, 12 Strong, and also starred as the Sultan in the 2019 live-action adaptation of Aladdin. In 2022, he appeared in the American crime drama television series The Cleaning Lady as Hayak Barsamian, an Armenian Mob Boss.

In 2025, he appeared as Abbas Mansuri in Netflix's The Night Agent, the Iranian Ambassador to the UN working in New York. Of interest is that in the entire show his dialog is in Persian (Farsi) with subtitles in English, giving an added air of credibility to the character. His short film The Apple Tree (2025), which he directed, won Best Short Film at the Japan Indies Film Festival. He received a BAFTA Games Award nomination for Best Performer in 2017 for his work on the video game 1979 Revolution: Black Friday. As executive producer, his film Baba Joon won five Ophir Awards including Best Picture at the Israeli Film Academy.

== Filmography ==
=== Film ===
| Year | Title | Role | Notes |
|---|---|---|---|
| 2005 | The Fallen Ones | Ammon | |
| 2006 | Broken | Keith | |
| 2007 | Waking Dreams | Toly | |
| 2007 | Charlie Wilson's War | Refugee Camp Translator | |
| 2007 | Richard III | Sir James Tyrrel | |
| 2008 | Djinn | Djinn | |
| 2008 | The Stoning of Soraya M. | Ali | |
| 2009 | Powder Blue | Dr. Brooks | |
| 2009 | Stellina Blue | Amir Keshavarz | |
| 2009 | Dead Air | Abir | |
| 2009 | Brothers | Murad | |
| 2011 | Atlas Shrugged: Part I | Dr. Robert Stadler | |
| 2013 | The Power of Few | Sahel | |
| 2013 | The Moment | Malik Jamil | |
| 2013 | Words and Pictures | Headmaster Rashid | |
| 2014 | American Sniper | Sheikh Al-Obodi | |
| 2015 | Baba Joon | Itzhak | Also executive producer |
| 2016 | Jimmy Vestvood: Amerikan Hero | Mohammad Mohammad-Mohammadi | |
| 2016 | Brain on Fire | Dr. Souhel Najjar | |
| 2016 | Window Horses | Mehran (voice) | |
| 2016 | Sniper: Ghost Shooter | Robert Mothershed | |
| 2017 | Sand Castle | Kadir | |
| 2017 | American Assassin | Minister Behruz | |
| 2017 | Carving a Life | Dr. Kasem | |
| 2017 | Damascus Cover | Sarraj | |
| 2018 | 12 Strong | General Abdul Rashid Dostum | |
| 2019 | Aladdin | The Sultan | |
| 2022 | Tehranto | Narrator | Also executive producer |
| 2023 | Batman: The Doom That Came to Gotham | Ra's al Ghul (voice) | |
| 2023 | Kandahar | Mohammad "Mo" Doud | |
| 2023 | Sitting in Bars with Cake | Isaac | |
| 2025 | The Apple Tree | Gate Keeper | Short film; Best Short Film — JIFF Japan Indies Film Festival |

=== Television ===
| Year | Title | Role | Notes |
|---|---|---|---|
| 2000 | The Invisible Man | Oman Tariq | |
| 2002 | The Shield | Zayed Al-Thani | |
| 2003 | The Agency | Arab Driver / Palestinian Officer | 2 episodes |
| 2003 | JAG | Jamal Bin Fahad Al-Hadi | |
| 2004 | Threat Matrix | Fred | |
| 2004 | The West Wing | Maz | |
| 2004 | Lost | Omar | Episode: "Solitary" |
| 2005 | Over There | Iraqi Father | |
| 2005 | 24 | Abdullah | |
| 2006 | Las Vegas | Farouk Naeem | |
| 2006 | The Unit | Faheed | Episode: "Security" |
| 2006 | Without a Trace | Nazar Rahim | |
| 2006 | The Path to 9/11 | Khalili | 2 episodes |
| 2006 | Criminal Minds | Hassan Nadir | Episode: "Secrets and Lies" |
| 2006 | Alias | Foreman | |
| 2006 | Law & Order | Imam Ibrahim | Episode: "Fear America" |
| 2006 | The Closer | Dr. Al-Thani | 2 episodes |
| 2006 | Sleeper Cell | The Colonel | |
| 2007 | Shark | Amir Khan | |
| 2007 | Law & Order: Special Victims Unit | Dr. Rankesh Chanoor | Episode: "Outsider" |
| 2007 | NCIS | Jalil Shaloub | |
| 2007 | Moonlight | Amir Fayed | |
| 2009 | Fringe | Dr. Malik Yusef | Episode: "Fracture" |
| 2010 | CSI: Miami | Rahim Farooq | Episode: "Dishonor" |
| 2010 | 24 | Jamot | 8 episodes |
| 2010 | Dark Blue | Ahmad Satar | |
| 2010 | NCIS: Los Angeles | Aziz Anshiri | |
| 2010 | The Whole Truth | Paul Bagdazarian | |
| 2011 | Covert Affairs | Unknown | |
| 2011–2013 | Homeland | Abu Nazir | 20 episodes |
| 2013 | CSI: NY | Zane Kalim | |
| 2013 | The Game | Martin Sheibani | Episode: "I Love Luke...ahh!" |
| 2013 | Arrow | Al-Owal | Episode: "League of Assassins" |
| 2014 | The Mentalist | Hassan Zarif | |
| 2014 | Person of Interest | Ali Hasan | Episode: "Panopticon" |
| 2014 | Tatort | Harun | |
| 2015 | Scorpion | Agent Khara | Episode: "Forget Me Nots" |
| 2015 | Veep | Abbas | |
| 2015 | Law & Order: Special Victims Unit | Sam Farhidi | |
| 2015 | The Messengers | Afghan Prime Minister | 4 episodes |
| 2016 | The Catch | Qasim Halabi | 2 episodes |
| 2016 | Mistresses | Jonathan Amadi | 6 episodes |
| 2017 | Curb Your Enthusiasm | Morsi | Episode: "Never Wait for Seconds!" |
| 2018 | The Team | Said Gharbour | 8 episodes |
| 2018–2019 | Legion | Amahl Farouk / Shadow King | 19 episodes |
| 2018–2019 | God Friended Me | Hasan | 2 episodes |
| 2020 | Castlevania | Sala (voice) | 10 episodes |
| 2020 | Tehran | Masoud Tabrizi | 8 episodes |
| 2022 | The Cleaning Lady | Hayak Barsamian | Recurring role |
| 2022 | The Serpent Queen | Claude, Duke of Guise | 4 episodes |
| 2022–2024 | The Old Man | Faraz Hamzad | 6 episodes |
| 2023 | Ghosts of Beirut | Ali-Reza Asgari | 3 episodes |
| 2023 | Pantheon | Dr. Farhad Karimi (voice) | 3 episodes |
| 2024 | WondLa | Loroc (voice) | |
| 2024 | Am Abgrund | Tofik Gasimov | |
| 2025 | The Night Agent | Abbas Mansuri | 8 episodes |
| 2025 | Splinter Cell: Deathwatch | Reza "Gunther" Karimi (voice) | 8 episodes |

=== Video games ===
| Year | Title | Role | Notes |
|---|---|---|---|
| 2008 | Dead Space | Dr. Challus Mercer | |
| 2010 | Dark Void | The Watcher | |
| 2010 | Prince of Persia: The Forgotten Sands | Opening Poem Reader, Sandman, additional voices | |
| 2010 | Medal of Honor | Pashto Fighter 5 | |
| 2012 | Ghost Recon: Future Soldier | Thug | |
| 2012 | Spec Ops: The Line | Refugees | |
| 2012 | Call of Duty: Black Ops II | Additional Voices | |
| 2016 | 1979 Revolution: Black Friday | Asadollah Lajevardi | Also producer |
| 2020 | Call of Duty: Black Ops Cold War | Arash Kadivar | |
| 2022 | Gotham Knights | Ra's al Ghul | |
