= Als die Sonne vom Himmel fiel =

- Movie poster in Switzerland
- Directed by: Aya Domenig
- Written by: Aya Domenig
- Produced by: Mirjam von Arx; Tanja Meding
- Cinematography: Desai Mrinal
- Edited by: Tania Stöcklin
- Music by: Marcel Vaid
- Distributed by: Ican Films GmbH and Look Now! in Switzerland.
- Release date: August 9, 2015 (Locarno Film Festival)
- Running time: 78 minutes
- Country: Switzerland
- Languages: Japanese and German

Als die Sonne vom Himmel fiel is a 2015 Swiss documentary. Focusing on the atomic bombing of Hiroshima by the United States Army Air Force on 6 August 1945, it was filmed and produced at locations in the Hiroshima and in the Fukushima prefectures, Japan, and produced by the Japanese-Swiss film-maker Aya Domenig.

== Plot (excerpt) ==
The filmmaker Aya Domenig is of Japanese-Swiss origin and intended to trace the life of her grandfather – after the atomic bombing of Hiroshima by the United States Army Air Force on August 6, 1945 – Shigeru Doi worked as a doctor in a Red Cross hospital in Hiroshima, and the filmmaker tries to find closer to him. Aya Domenig meets Chizuko Uchida (born 1923), a former nurse, her grandmother and Shuntaro Hida (1917-2017), a doctor, the second Hibakusha (被爆者) who is portrayed in the documentary film – they have a similar fate as the filmmaker's grandfather who throughout his life never spoke about what he had experienced. While researching her film in Hiroshima, on March 11, 2011, the Fukushima Daiichi nuclear disaster occurs, and the film-maker's intention takes a turn.

Uchida is still involved in a citizens' initiative related to the Fukushima nuclear catastrophe, and she gave to a mother and her son who were refugees from Fukushima a new home. The other contemporary witness, Shuntaro Hida, still reads on his experiences in Hiroshima, but he no longer participates in the annual commemoration at the Hiroshima Peace Memorial Park, because he calls it "hypocrisy", and claims that the long-term consequences of nuclear radiation would be played down by the authorities and the suffering of the victims is still tabooized.

== Cast ==
- Aya Domenig as herself
- Kiyomi Doi as herself, Aya Domenig's grandmother.
- Shigeru Doi as himself, Aya Domenig's grandfather and Red Cross doctor.
- Sumiko Miyahara as Hiroshima Atomic bomb aftermath nurse.
- Chizuko Uchida as herself.
- Shinzo Abe as himself.
- Shuntaro Hida as himself as former Imperial Japanese Army doctor.
- Hitoshi Kai as himself (Chairman of Junod Association).
- Mai Nakata herself and refugee from Fukushima.
- Shoei Nakata himself and son of Mai Nakata.

== Title ==
The German language title Als die Sonne vom Himmel fiel literally means When the sun fell from the heaven, and is referring to the atomic bombing of Hiroshima. For the worldwide distribution, the title The Day The Sun Fell is used.

== Background ==
On 6 August 1945, some 70,000–80,000 people, or around 30% of the population of Hiroshima, were killed by the blast and resultant firestorm, and another 70,000 injured. According to the Hiroshima A-bomb Medical Care History, at the time of the atomic bombing there were 298 doctors of medicine in Hiroshima, but 60 of them were killed immediately, and 210 wounded. The thousands of wounded and dying people were then doctored by a very small group of medical personnel, among them Aya Domenig's grandfather, Shigeru Doi, who was a doctor of internal medicine at the Red Cross hospital, and Doctor Shuntaro Hida, as well as Chizuko Uchida and a number of other hospital nurses who cared for the victims after the atomic bombing.

== Production ==
Aya Domenig had been interested in the story of her family since she was a teenager: I always wanted to know more about the background of my grandfather. At film school she thought about making a graduation film on her grandfather's fate, but there was just time to produce short movies. When she visited her about 80 years old grandmother in Japan, she realised to hurry up to make the movie, and actually, she passed away one month after we finished the film.

In 2010 the director spent one month at her family in Japan, and she read an article about the Junod no Kai (literally: Society of Dr. Junod) – Domenig planned to hear first-hand accounts from Chizuko Uchida who was a member of the society that provided Red Cross hospitals after the bombing of Hiroshima. Domenig learned through Uchida that the period was not an easy topic to talk about: "I boiled water in a pot on the stove to disinfect surgical tools", told Mrs Ichida to school children when Domenig was filming, and "we burned many bodies". After assisting as nurse, Uchida returned to her parents' home, suffering from anemia, high fever and other aftereffects of the bombing. Nevertheless, she continued to work as a nurse until her retirement. "I was impressed by how she thinks on her own and moved on with her life after she experienced the bombing", Domenig said on occasion of an interview by the Japanese newspaper The Asahi Shimbun in October 2012.

Aya Domenig also used archival footage showing the victims of Hiroshima and demonstrating the destructive power of the bomb on the human body. The black and white material was shot in September 1945 and submitted by a journalist from Tokyo who had come without any official support with a group of scientists to record what had happened – the United States authorities noted this immediately and confiscated all the material. Only in 1968 some sequences for the first time were published. The color images were taken in April 1946 by the US Army to document the effects of the bombs, but first published in the 1980s.

Aya Domenig's first feature film was supported with CHF 365,000: CHF 145,000 by Filmstiftung of the Canton of Zürich and CHF 220,000 by the federal authorities (Bundesamt für Kultur BAK). Als die Sonne vom Himmel fiel was produced by ican films gmbh and Schweizer Radio und Fernsehen (SRF) and Finnish Broadcasting Company (YLE). The documentary was filmed at locations in Hiroshima and Fukushima in Japan.

Aya Domenig tells in German the fate of her grandfather, the interviews with the protagonists in Japan are in Japanese, and their statements are subtitled in German, French and English.

== Release ==
The Swiss documentary film premiered at the Festival del film Locarno on 9 August 2015, and was screened at the Hiroshima International Film Festival on 23 November 2015.

Distributed by Zürich-based Look Now!, the film had its Swiss cinema release on 7 January 2016 in Zurich, Basel, Bern, and Lucerne. It was shown on Swiss television for the first time on 7 September 2017.

== Home media ==
The film was released with the title Als die Sonne vom Himmel fiel in the DVD format (RC2) on 15 November 2016. The home release includes language versions in Swiss German and Japanese, and subtitles in English, French, Italian, Japanese, Spanish and German.

== Festivals ==
- 2017: 9th Festival de cine invisible, Bilbao, Caravan of Cairo International Women’s Film Festival.
- 2017: 15th RAI Film Festival, Bristol (UK).
- 2017: Environmental Film Festival in the Nation’s Capital (DCEFF), Washington DC.
- 2017: Cairo International Women Film Festival “Bain Synemayat”.
- 2017: Salem Film Fest, USA.
- 2016: 10th Cinéma Vérité Iran International Documentary Film Festival (special screenings).
- 2016: Incheon Human Right Film Festivals, South Korea.
- 2016: 35th Jean Rouch International Film Festival (competition).
- 2016: BIFED 2016, Turkey (competition).
- 2016: Fünf Seen Filmfestival (documentary competition).
- 2016: Seoul Human Rights Film Festival, Korea (SHRFF).
- 2016: EDOC – Encuentros del Otro Cine, Ecuador.
- 2016: International Film Festival Innsbruck (documentary competition), Austria.
- 2016: 13th Göttingen Int. Ethnographic Film Festival 2016, Germany.
- 2016: 26. Filmkunstfest Mecklenburg-Vorpommern (documentary competition), Germany.
- 2016: Bolzano Film Festival (documentary competition), Italy.
- 2016: Green Image Film Festival (competition), Tokyo, Japan.
- 2016: Thessaloniki Documentary Festival, Greece.
- 2016: DOCfeed Eindhoven (competition), Netherlands.
- 2016: Mumbai International Film Festival (international competition), Mumbai, India.
- 2016: Solothurner Filmtage, Solothurn, Switzerland.
- 2016: Filmfestival Max Ophüls Preis (documentary competition), Saarbrücken, Germany.
- 2015: This Human World Film Festival, Wien, Austria.
- 2015: Hiroshima International Film Festival, Hiroshima, Japan.
- 2015: Kino Rätia Thusis, Thusis, Switzerland.
- 2015: 68th Festival del film Locarno, Semaine de la Critique (competition), Locarno, Switzerland.

== Awards ==
- 2016; Special Mention: Fleury Doc, 35th Jean Rouch International Film Festival.
- 2016; Prix Mario Ruspoli, 35th Jean Rouch International Film Festival.
- 2016; Prix Anthropologie et développement durable, 35th Jean Rouch International Film Festival.
- 2016; Fethi Kayaalp Grand Prize – 2nd Prize 2016, Bozcaada International Festival of Ecological Documentary (BIFED).
- 2016; David Plath Media Award for best film work on East Asian Anthropology.
- 2016; Horizonte-Filmprize, Fünf Seen Filmfestival.
- 2016; Special mention, 26. Filmkunstfest Mecklenburg-Vorpommern.
- 2016; Special mention, Bolzano Filmfestival.
- 2016; Green Image Award, Green Image Film Festival, Tokyo.
- 2016: Swiss Film Award nomination for Best Documentary Film and Best Film Score.
- 2016; Swiss Film Award for Best Film Score (Beste Musik) for Marcel Vaid.

== Reception ==
The Swiss newspaper Der Landbote claims: Aya Domenig succeeded the balancing act between personal retelling of the family history and the historical analysis. It is a universal lesson on a piece of the history that has lost none of its relevance today.

cineuropa.org claims: This is a sincere film, a reflection of a wounded country that, nevertheless, is looking to heal itself, slowly but tirelessly.

Semaine de la critique, a cooperation of the Swiss Association of Film Journalists and the Locarno International Film Festival claims: Domenig observes the old woman’s quiet determination. With her thirst for action she represents, as it were, the crisis-stricken island nation that time and again evades facing its traumas. In order to endure the future, light has to be shed on the shadows of the past. Aya Domenig’s highly sensitive film is a contribution to this endeavour.
