= Amrus Natalsya Who Recreates the Dispossessed in Twilight =

2021 Indonesian documentary film directed by Mahardhika Yudha

Amrus Natalsya Who Recreates the Dispossessed in Twilight is a 2021 Indonesian documentary film written and directed by Mahardhika Yudha. The film is based on the life of Indonesian sculptor Amrus Natalsya who was detained without trial during the violent anti-communist purges in 1965–66. The film documents Natalsya's personal life trajectory and his career as an artist during the 1950s. The film was screened at the 51st International Film Festival Rotterdam in the Harbour section.
