= Nothing but the Sun =

- Poster of the documentary
- Spanish: Apenas el sol
- Directed by: Arami Ullón
- Written by: Arami Ullon
- Produced by: Pascal Trächslin; Arami Ullón
- Starring: Mateo Sobode Chinqueno; Apai Roman Dosape Chinqueno; Ayoreo Community
- Edited by: Valeria Racioppi (SAE)
- Music by: Ayoreo Traditional Music
- Distributed by: Cineworx; Arami Ullon Cine
- Release date: 18 November 2020 (IDFA)
- Running time: 75 minutes
- Countries: Paraguay; Switzerland
- Languages: Ayoreo, Spanish

Nothing but the Sun (Spanish: Apenas el Sol) is a 2020 Paraguayan-Swiss documentary film created and directed by Arami Ullón. The film is about Mateo Sobode Chiqueno, an Ayoreo indigenous man from Paraguay who has recorded Ayoreo interviews, songs, and rituals for over 40 years. It was selected as the Paraguayan entry for the Best International Feature Film at the 94th Academy Awards.

== Critical reception ==
This film has been received positively in documentary film festivals. Film Critics have expressed as follows:

- "Nothing But The Sun (Apenas El Sol) offers a moving requiem for uprooted communities with no possibility of reclaiming the life they once cherished." − Allan Hunter
- "Through a gaze imbued with poetry and respect, Arami Ullón drills deep down inside of her protagonists searching for the truth which lies beyond their words and can be found... truths which have been inscribed in their bodies despite their uprooting." – Georgia del Don
- "I hope our government gets to know this film, about the life of the Ayoreo people and that it will also be known in other countries. I am Mateo Sobode Chiqueno."
- "Nothing But The Sun, the film deals with colonialism, the theft of land, and the destruction of an ancient culture. ”It is tackling some of the most urgent questions of our era but this all comes through in an artistically ambitious style." – Orwa Nyrabia

== Accolades ==
Nothing but the Sun was awarded by Fipresci (2021), Rencontres de Toulouse (2021). It has been awarded Best Feature Documentary Award in the Lunenburg Doc Fest (Canada), and BYDGOSZCZ ART.DOC.

== See also ==
- List of submissions to the 94th Academy Awards for Best International Feature Film
- List of Paraguayan submissions for the Academy Award for Best International Feature Film
