= Chris the Swiss =

2018 film

- Film poster
- Directed by: Anja Kofmel
- Written by: Anja Kofmel
- Produced by: Sereina Gabathuler; Samir; Sinisa Juricic; Iikka Vehkalahti
- Cinematography: Simon Guy Fässler Philipp Künzli Gabriel Sandru
- Edited by: Stefan Kälin Sophie Brunner Vladimir Gojun Višnja Skorin
- Music by: Marcel Vaid
- Production companies: Dschoint Ventschr Filmproduktion AG; Nukleus Film; Ma.Ja.De Filmproduktion; IV Films; SRF Schweizer Radio und Fernsehen
- Distributed by: Switzerland: First Hand Films GmbH France: Urban Distribution International
- Release date: 13 May 2018; (Critics' Week)
- Running time: 90 minutes
- Countries: Switzerland; Croatia; Germany; Finland
- Languages: English; Swiss German; Spanish; German

Chris the Swiss is a 2018 Swiss animated documentary film written and directed by Anja Kofmel. It follows Kofmel’s investigation into the death of her cousin Chris during the Yugoslav Wars. The film premiered in the Critics’ Week section at the 2018 Cannes Film Festival and won Best Documentary Film at the 2019 Swiss Film Awards.

== Synopsis ==
During the Yugoslav Wars, Swiss journalist Chris is found dead in Croatia while wearing the uniform of an international mercenary group. His cousin Anja Kofmel later investigates his death in an effort to understand his involvement in the conflict.

== Cast ==
The cast includes:

- Susanne-Marie Wrage as German Narrator / Voice Anja
- Megan Gay as English Narrator / Voice Anja
- Joel Basman as Voice Chris
- Domagoj Janković as Voice Flores
- Marko Cindrić as Voice Julio
- Barbara Durović as Voice Heidi
- Dean Krivačić as Voice Alex
- Damjan Simić as Voice Paul
- Milton Welsh as Voice Frenchy
- Eva Japundžić as Voice Kid 1
- Grgur Japundžić as Voice Kid 2

== Production ==
Kofmel chose a hybrid documentary-animation format to depict the more speculative parts of Chris Würtenberg’s story. She worked on the film for six years with a team of 35 artists, and one second of animation required nine and a half hours of work.

== Reception ==
=== Awards ===
At the 2019 Swiss Film Awards, the film won Best Documentary Film, Best Film Editing, and Best Film Score. It also won the Zürich Film Prize in 2018, the Award for Best Feature Film at the Animator International Animated Film Festival in 2019, and the Preis der Norbert Daldrop Förderung für Kunst und Kultur at the Deutscher Dokumentarfilmpreis in Stuttgart in 2019.

=== Critical response ===
Stephen Dalton of The Hollywood Reporter said "Swiss director Anja Kofmel revisits the wild life and strange death of her war reporter cousin with an innovative blend of animation and documentary". Variety described the film as a “compelling and artistic hybrid” of memoir and biographical documentary that “does not attempt to sand the troubled history it explores down to smoothness”. Filmdienst described the film as a striking hybrid of documentary and animation, with interviews and nightmarish black-and-white animated sequences.

== Festival screenings ==
The film premiered in the Critics’ Week section at the 2018 Cannes Film Festival. It was later screened at the International Documentary Film Festival Amsterdam in 2018; Anima, the Brussels International Animation Film Festival, the Istanbul International Film Festival, and the Animator International Animated Film Festival in Poznań in 2019; and the Thessaloniki Documentary Festival in 2020.
