= Eami =

2022 Paraguayan drama film

EAMI
- Film poster
- Directed by: Paz Encina
- Written by: Paz Encina
- Produced by: Paz Encina; Christoph Hahnheiser; Josune Hahnheiser; Ilse Hughan; Nicolas Gil Lavedra; Emiliano Torres; Raymond van der Kaaij
- Starring: Anel Picanerai; Curia Chiquejno Etacoro; Ducubaide Chiquenoi; Basui Picanerai Etacore; Lucas Etacori; Guesa Picanerai; Lazaro Dosapei Cutamijo
- Cinematography: Guillermo Saposnik
- Edited by: Jordana Berg
- Music by: Fernando Velázquez Vezzetti; Joraine Picanerai
- Release date: 26 January 2022 (Rotterdam)
- Running time: 83 minutes
- Countries: Paraguay; United States; Germany; Netherlands; Argentina; France; Mexico
- Language: Ayoreo

EAMI is a 2022 Ayoreo-language drama film written, co-produced and directed by Paz Encina. It was screened in the 51st International Film Festival Rotterdam and won the Tiger Award.

== Cast ==
- Anel Picanerai
- Curia Chiquejno Etacoro
- Ducubaide Chiquenoi
- Basui Picanerai Etacore
- Lucas Etacori
- Guesa Picanerai
- Lazaro Dosapei Cutamijo

== Production ==
The film is an international co-production between Paraguay, Germany, Argentina, Netherlands, France and United States.

== Awards and nominations ==
Award	Date of ceremony	Category	Recipient(s)	Result	Ref.
International Film Festival Rotterdam	6 February 2022	Tiger Award	EAMI	Won	
Platino Awards	22 April 2023	Best Documentary	EAMI	Nominated	
Rolling Stone en Español Awards	26 October 2023	Documentary Feature Film of the Year	EAMI	Nominated	

== See also ==
- List of submissions to the 95th Academy Awards for Best International Feature Film
- List of Paraguayan submissions for the Academy Award for Best International Feature Film
