= Yuval Delshad =

Israeli film director of Iranian descent

- יובל דלשד
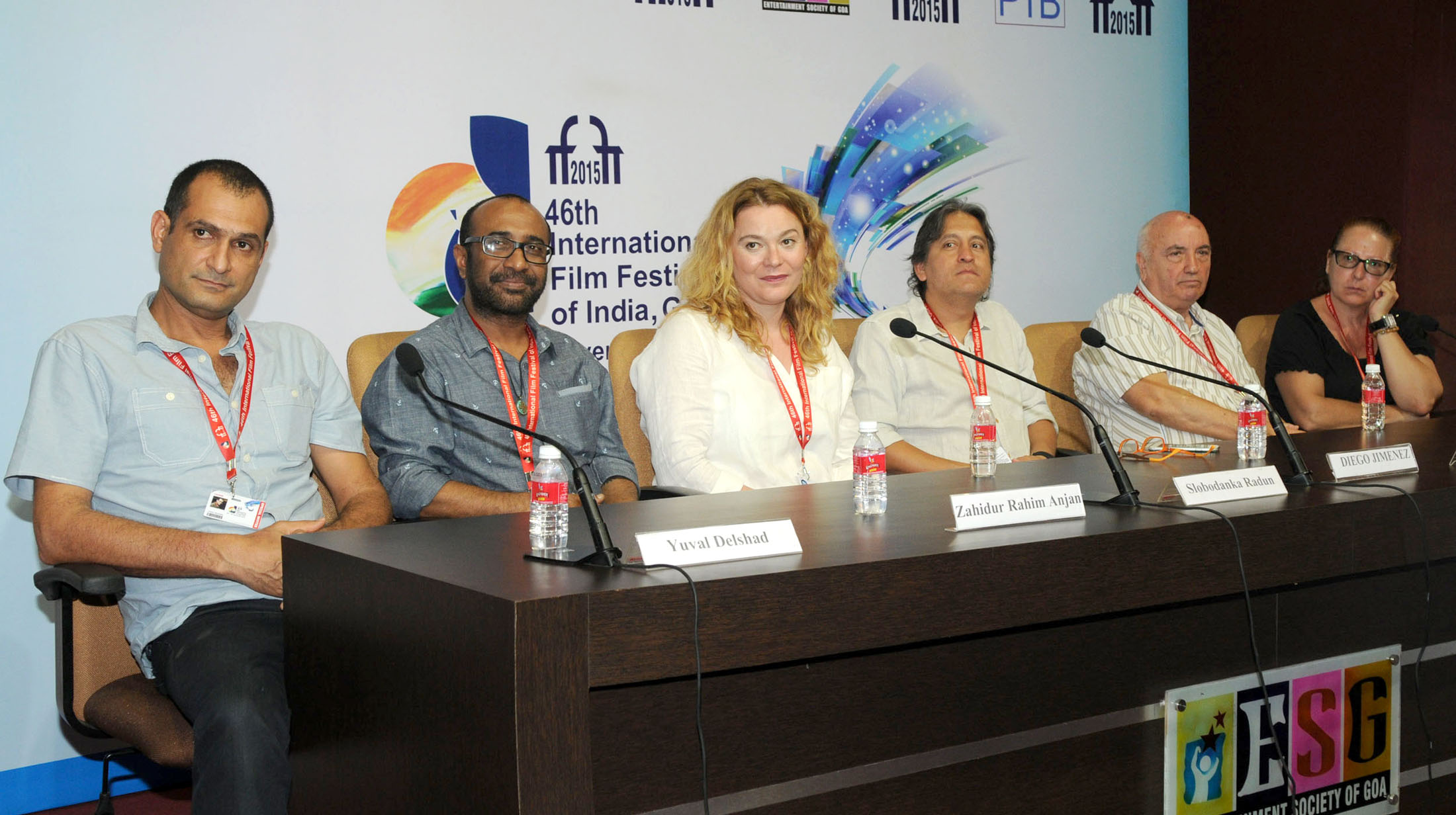
- Yuval Delshad, IFFI (2015)
- Occupation: Film director
- Notable work: Baba Joon (film)

Yuval Delshad (Hebrew: יובל דלשד) is an Israeli film director of Iranian descent. He gained popularity in 2015 for directing Baba Joon, "the first Persian-language Israeli film". The film was screened in the Contemporary World Cinema section of the 2015 Toronto International Film Festival. At the 2015 Ophir Awards, the film won the award for the Best Film. After these initial successes, the film became Israel's entry for the Best Foreign Language Film at the 88th Academy Awards.

== Filmography ==
- Judith: A Story of a Convert (2001)
- Regards from the War (2013)
- Baba Joon (2015)

== See also ==
- Cinema of Israel
- List of submissions to the 88th Academy Awards for Best Foreign Language Film
- List of Israeli submissions for the Academy Award for Best Foreign Language Film
