= The Plains (film) =

Australian docudrama film

- Directed by: David Easteal
- Screenplay by: David Easteal
- Produced by: David Easteal
- Starring: Andrew Rakowski; David Easteal
- Edited by: David Easteal
- Production company: David Easteal Film
- Release date: 2022
- Country: Australia
- Language: English

The Plains is a 2022 Australian docudrama film written and directed by David Easteal. It premiered at the 51st International Film Festival Rotterdam.

== Premise ==
The Plains is filmed almost entirely from the backseat of a car showing the daily commute of a middle-aged lawyer, Andrew Rakowski.

== Cast ==
- Andrew Rakowski
- David Essteal
- Cheri LeCornu
- Inga Rakowski
- Jon Faine (voice)
- Sarah Jane Bell (voice)

== Production ==
David Easteal serves as writer, director, producer, editor and actor on the project. A Melbourne-based barrister and film maker, Easteal would give Rakowski a lift to and from work, their commute conversations served as the basis for the film, which were then scripted and filmed. Drone shots in Horsham, Victoria are also used as well as commuter traffic in Melbourne.

== Reception ==
On the review aggregator website Rotten Tomatoes, The Plains holds an approval rating of 100% based from 13 reviews.

=== Critical reception ===
Richard Kuipers in Variety described it as “thematically rich and quietly compelling”. Ben Kenisberg in The New York Times said that “fans of structural film, Jeanne Dielman and Google Maps will find much to treasure. Luke Buckmaster in The Guardian described it as a “tremendous achievement and, in a subtle way, an amazing work of art” and that it demonstrates that “drama can exist without the dramatic and that engaging narratives are everywhere around us, observable with the right eyes.” He later included it as number one in his list of the top ten Australian films of the year.

== Release ==
The film had its world premiere at the Rotterdam Film Festival in January 2022.
