= Paraguayan Hammock =

2006 film

- Film poster
- Directed by: Paz Encina
- Written by: Paz Encina
- Produced by: Simon Field; Keith Griffiths
- Starring: Ramon Del Rio; Georgina Genes
- Cinematography: Willi Behnisch
- Edited by: Miguel Schverdfinger
- Release date: 18 May 2006
- Running time: 78 minutes
- Country: Paraguay
- Language: Guaraní

Paraguayan Hammock (Guarani: Hamaca paraguaya) is a 2006 Guaraní-language Paraguayan drama film directed by Paz Encina. It was screened in the Un Certain Regard section at the 2006 Cannes Film Festival.

== Synopsis ==
The story, depicted cinematically through a series of poignant still shots and accompanied by off-screen dialogues, unfolds over the course of a single day, June 14, 1935. The setting is a remote, isolated jungle terrain in Paraguay. The central characters are Cándida and Ramón, an elderly peasant couple. Their son, Maximiliano Ramón Caballero, had departed to join the Chaco War, and both parents anxiously await his return. The father holds onto hope, confident in his belief that he will reunite with his son alive, while the mother is burdened by the darkest of forebodings.

Both stand vigil beneath an overcast sky that threatens rain but never delivers, enduring unrelenting heat, unmitigated by even the slightest breeze. The constant, irritating barking of the dog their son entrusted to their care during his absence adds to the tension. Finally, a postman arrives bearing the long-awaited news concerning their son.

== Cast ==
- Ramon Del Rio as Ramón
- Georgina Genes as Cándida
