= The Dream and the Radio =

2022 French language film

- French: Le rêve et la radio
- Directed by: Renaud Després-Larose; Ana Tapia Rousiouk
- Written by: Renaud Després-Larose; Ana Tapia Rousiouk; Geneviève Ackerman
- Starring: Geneviève Ackerman; Ana Tapia Rousiouk; Renaud Després-Larose; Étienne Pilon; Luis Neves; Leslie Mavangui; Maria-Gabriela Garcia-Rousiouk; Marc Landry; Mario Gauthier; Chantale Laplante
- Cinematography: Renaud Després-Larose
- Music by: Mario Gauthier
- Distributed by: La Distributrice de Films
- Release date: 2022
- Running time: 135 min
- Country: Canada
- Language: French

The Dream and the Radio (French: Le rêve et la radio) is a Quebec/Canadian film directed by Renaud Després-Larose and Ana Tapia Rousiouk, released in 2022. On the basis of their own creative, political and financial struggles, two filmmakers – along with composer Geneviève Ackerman – decide to play the lead roles in a B-movie inspired scenario, creating a diffracted projection of their own concerns with the state of things. Mixing hybrid elements and using alienating visual and sound effects, the film also refer to experimental and political film movements from the 1920s and 1960s.

== Plot ==
The lives of three friends, Constance, Eugene and Beatrice, are shaken up by the arrival of Raoul Debord, a self-proclaimed revolutionary who has his sights set on taking over the city's radio stations.

== Production ==
Shot over a three-year period with an old analog camera, no budget, financial or professional support, the film was entirely produced with the help of friends, neighbours and homeless people. The editing of the film was followed by a series of institutional and financial rejections for the post-production. The sound design and mixing were finally made possible thanks to the generous help of Serge Cardinal and the laboratory La création sonore of the University of Montreal.

== Release ==
The film was distributed by La Distributrice de films and received a late help from the Conseil des Arts du Canada as well a fund from SODEC for promotional purposes. The Dream and the Radio had an official theatrical release in September 2022 in la Cinémathèque québécoise, Cinéma Moderne and Cinéma Public. Extra dates were scheduled in October and November 2022.

== Reception ==
=== International ===
The Dream and the Radio had its world premiere in the Tiger Competition of the International Film Festival of Rotterdam in January 2022, and was followed by selections in Berlin Critics' Week and Doclisboa International Film Festival, among others. It received good to very positive reviews and was considered by many critics to be one of the most challenging films of the 2022 Tiger Competition, including Cahiers du cinéma, Film Comment, and Mubi Notebook. The film was particularly praised for its visual ("some of the most memorable and gorgeous images to come out of the movies this year"), its exploratory use of sound ("one of the most ingenious uses of sound and of sound distortion I have heard in recent films") and its political dimension ("the film exude a common sense of urgency in the face of structural neglect, offering a blank canvas for generational discontent to fully erupt").

=== Québec ===
Covering the Rotterdam International Film Festival in January 2022, Olivier Thibodeau from Panorama Cinéma stated that The Dream and the Radio was "one of the most exciting Québec fiction films in quite a while." Even though the film was not mentioned in the programming announcement and was excluded from any nomination during the 2022 edition of Rendez-vous Québec Cinéma, it had a sold-out home premiere on April 28. It was also disregarded earlier by the Festival du Nouveau Cinéma. In October 2022, Martin Gignac from Ciné-Bulles stated that "even though it was screened at the prestigious Rotterdam and Berlin festivals, The Dream and the Radio by Ana Tapia Rousiouk and Renaud Després-Larose remains the best-kept secret of Quebec cinema in 2022." The film was praised in Quebec by many critics.

== Official website ==
Created and designed by Jorge D. Gonzalez to explore and prolong the five years experience of making the film, the website offers a great variety of unreleased material, including audiovisual bonus and deleted scenes, radio archives, reviews, interviews, reflexive texts by the filmmakers, making of stills, and more...
