= Cloudy Times =

2014 film

- Film poster
- Directed by: Arami Ullon
- Written by: Arami Ullon
- Produced by: Pascal Trächslin; Arami Ullón
- Starring: Mirna Villalba; Arami Ullón; Luis Ullón; Osvaldo Ortíz Faiman
- Cinematography: Ramòn Giger
- Edited by: Mirjam Krakenberger
- Music by: Marcel Vaid
- Distributed by: Cineworx Verleih
- Release date: 7 July 2014 (Karlovy IFF)
- Running time: 92 minutes
- Countries: Paraguay; Switzerland
- Languages: Spanish, English

Cloudy Times (Spanish: El tiempo nublado) is a 2014 documentary film directed by Arami Ullon. The film illustrates Ullón's relationship with her ageing mother, who has epilepsy and Parkinson's disease, and the conflicts she faces when she needs to take care of her while living away. It was selected as the Paraguayan entry for the Best Foreign Language Film at the 88th Academy Awards and Goya Awards. The documentary is a co-production between Switzerland, where the director resides, and Paraguay.

== Synopsis ==
For as long as Arami can remember, her mother has had epilepsy and Parkinson's. Her parents were separated, so Arami was left alone with a mother who had seizures that she remembers as terrifying. At a very young age, she was to care for herself and her mother. Now as an adult, Ullón has been living in Switzerland with her partner Patrick. Despite the distance, she maintained contact with her mother, and has been supervising her care. Arami's mother, Mirna, continues to live in Paraguay with Julia, a caregiver without adequate preparation for the task, who takes care of her throughout the day in exchange for a modest salary. The conflict begins with her mother's health deteriorating and Julia announcing she can no longer cope with the situation, wanting to quit her job. Since no one except Arami can take care of her mother, she must return to Paraguay. Arami starts a difficult journey trying to find adequate care for her mother, that develops in a series of practical and emotional challenges.

== Reception ==
The documentary premiered at the Vision du Reel International Festival, in April 2014, where Cloudy Times won the prize for Best First Feature. The film has been shown in more than 70 Film Festivals, and commercially, the movie has been shown in at least ten cities in Switzerland, and three Paraguayan cities. It is available online for streaming under the names Cloudy Times and Storms of the Heart.

Cloudy Times has been selected by the Paraguayan Film Academy to be submitted for the Academy Awards, becoming the first Oscar submission for the country. The film caused debate in Paraguay by exposing a harsh reality for the sick and elder: There is a lack of public services, and relatives find themselves with no resources. As a reaction to the documentary, a map with municipal free services for the elderly has been created.

== Reviews ==
- "Arami Ullón's El Tiempo Nublado (Cloudy Times)...demonstrates a keen awareness of the sensitivities involved in recording the life of a vulnerable person. Ullón deftly sidesteps the pitfalls ... a task complicated further by the intensely personal nature of the film". Dr. Catherine Leen
- "Powerful, intimate and uncomfortably voyeuristic". Jonathan Holland
- "A supremely personal film set in part in a distant land, El tiempo nublado still turns on an issue which will be instantly – and movingly familiar – to film viewers around the world: How to care for one’s parents once they are old and ill." John Hopewell
- "El tiempo nublado is a kind of psychotherapy achieved through images, which nevertheless has the incredibly admirable quality of never falling into the trap of navel-gazing, instead regaling us, in a very genuine way, with an unexpected and reinvigorating emotional universality, a collective catharsis that makes the film one of a kind, halfway between a documentary and an intimate portrait... It is a refined work of great depth that can’t help but draw us in" Giorgia del Don

== See also ==
- List of submissions to the 88th Academy Awards for Best Foreign Language Film
- List of Paraguayan submissions for the Academy Award for Best Foreign Language Film
