= Luciana Mazeto =

- Born: Brazil
- Education: Pontifical Catholic University of Rio Grande do Sul (PUCRS)
- Occupations: Screenwriter, Film producer, Film director
- Notable work: Irmã

Luciana Mazeto is a Brazilian screenwriter, film producer and film director.

== Biography ==
Luciana Mazeto studied cinema at the Pontifical Catholic University of Rio Grande do Sul (PUCRS) in Porto Alegre. Together with the film director Vinícius Lopes, she directed and wrote several short films that were screened in national and international film festivals.

== Career ==
In 2012, Luciana Mazeto and Vinícius Lopes founded the production company Pátio Vazio. They are the co-producers of the film festival Cine Esquema Novo in Porto Alegre, in 2016.

In 2020, they produced their first feature film, Irmã. As their mother's health worsens, the two sisters Ana and Julia, decide to travel to the south of Brazil in search of their father. They embark on a journey of initiation that will mark them forever. Irmã had its world premiere in the Generation 14 Plus category at the 70th Berlinale in 2020.

== Filmography ==
=== Short films ===
- 2010: Let Me Tell You About Noel
- 2011: Purge
- 2012: Berenice
- 2013: Three Mice
- 2014: Little Things
- 2015: Behind the Shadow
- 2016: Under the Door
- 2018: Stone Engravings and the Three-Colored Chickenpox Tale
- 2020: The Eyes in the Woods and the Taste in the Water

=== Feature films ===
2020 : Irmã by Vinicius Lopes and Luciana Mazeto, Pátio Vazio
