= Juan Carlos Maneglia =

Paraguayan film maker (born 1966)

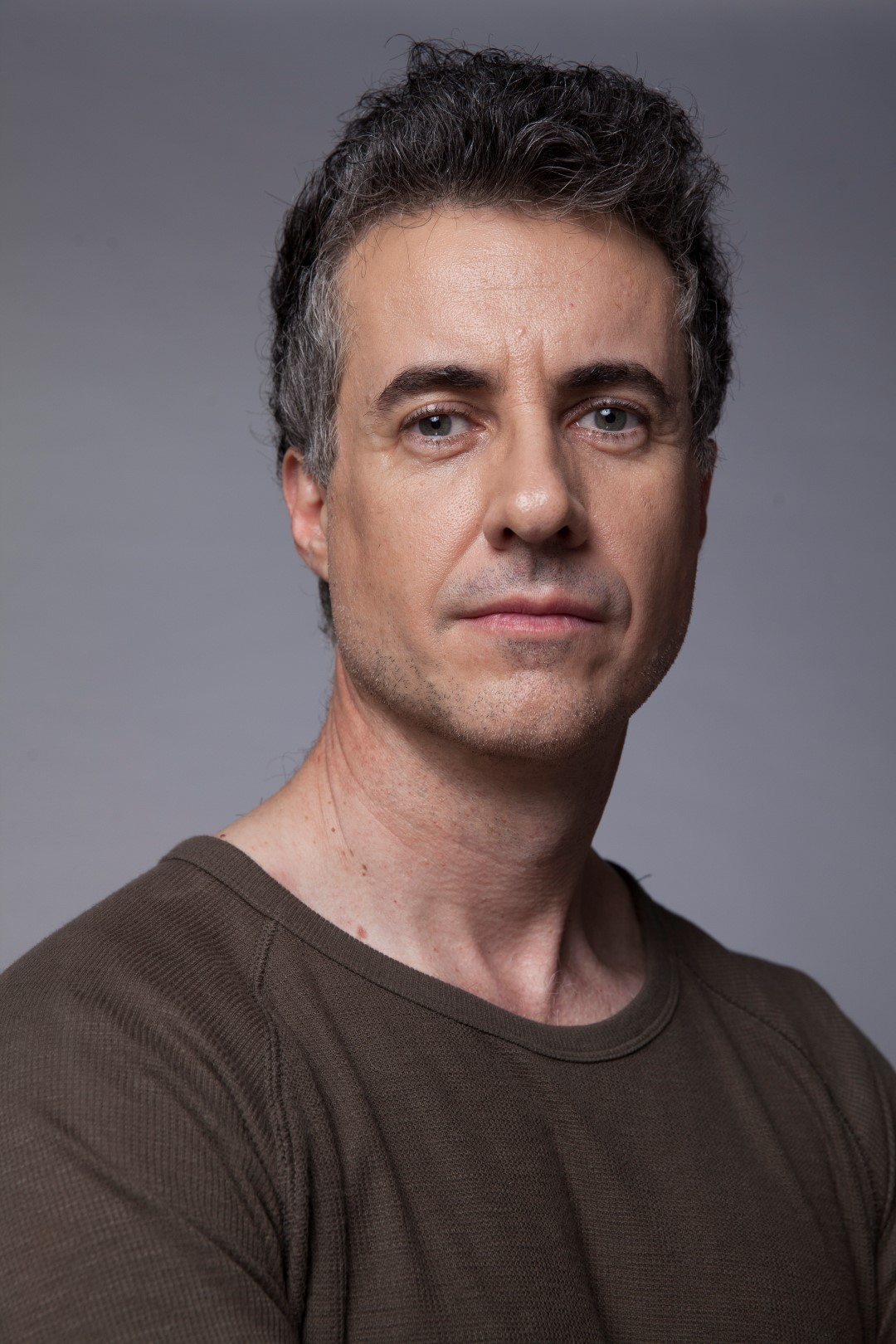
- Born: 9 June 1966 (age 58); Asunción, Paraguay
- Occupation(s): Film director, screenwriter
- Notable work: 7 Boxes (2012); The Gold Seekers (2017)
- Partner: Tana Schémbori

Juan Carlos Maneglia is a Paraguayan film maker. A member of the Maneglia Schémbori duo, Juan Carlos Maneglia is the most recognized reference in the Paraguayan film industry, along with Tana Schémbori with whom he has co-directed since its inception short films, telefilms, television series, and the two renowned Paraguayan fiction feature films, 7 Boxes and The Gold Seekers.

== Life and career ==
He finished his secondary studies at Cristo Rey School. He earned a Bachelor of Science in communication. He made his first short film at age 11 using a Super 8 camera. His passion for directing Super 8 film led him to make short films regardless of the format - VHS, film, and digital - and winning national and international awards. In 1991 he was awarded with a scholarship from the International School of Cinema and TV in San Antonio de los Baños, Cuba and in 1999, he went to an intensive film workshop at the prestigious NYFA, on an awarded scholarship from UNESCO.

== Filmography ==
=== 7 Boxes ===
7 Boxes (Spanish: 7 Cajas) is the highest-grossing film in the history of Paraguayan cinema until the present time. It was nominated for the Goya Awards in 2013, an it premiered at the 2012 Toronto International Film Festival and 2012 Stockholm International Film Festival. It has won more than 29 international awards, and participated in more than 136 festivals as of 2014. It has premiered in commercial movie theaters in the United States, Spain, Bolivia, Brazil, France, and Mexico, in this last country it was in 29 cinema rooms of the largest chain in the country.

=== The Gold Seekers ===
The Gold Seekers (Spanish: Los Buscadores) is a 2017 Paraguayan adventure film. It was selected as the Paraguayan entry for the Best Foreign Language Film at the 90th Academy Awards.

The film premiered in Paraguay, on 7 September 2017, and in its eighth week on the billboard exceeded 130,000 spectators. It became the second highest-grossing film of the year, behind "The Fate of the Furious", with 191,000 spectators; in the second highest grossing Paraguayan film in history, behind "7 Boxes" (261,000 spectators); and in the fourth most seen in Paraguay, according to the portal Ultracine.

== Quotes ==
- "It was not ... advice, but the first time I told my dad that I wanted to make movies, he said: 'My son, that sound[s] [to] me as if you want to be an astronaut.' It made me see that what I dreamed was very strange".

- "It is very beautiful to know that you can tell stories and people can identify with what you do. We started directing together 27 years ago. We always dream of a Paraguayan cinema that identifies with us, continuously, to find our identity."

== Awards ==
Title	Year	Film Festival	Category	Result	Ref(s)
7 Boxes	2011	59º San Sebastián International Film Festival	Films in Progress	Won	
7 Boxes	2012	12º Toronto International Film Festival	Premiere		
7 Boxes	2012	60º San Sebastián International Film Festival	New Directors	Won	
7 Boxes	2012	Cine Cockatoo Island	Best Dramatic Film	Won	
7 Boxes	2012	International Film Festival of Estocolmo	Latin Visions	Nominated	
7 Boxes	2012	International Film Festival of India		Nominated	
7 Boxes	2012	34º Havana Film Festival		Nominated	
7 Boxes	2013	Palm Springs International Film Festival	New Visions	Won	
7 Boxes	2013	Santa Barbara International Film Festival	New Visions	Won	
7 Boxes	2013	Goya Awards	Best Spanish-Language Foreign Film	Won	
7 Boxes	2013	Cartagena Film Festival	Best Director and Fiction Writer	Won	
7 Boxes	2013	Miami Film Festival	Audience Award	Won	
7 Boxes	2013	Chicago International Film Festival		Nominated	
7 Boxes	2013	Seattle International Film Festival		Nominated	
7 Boxes	2013	Festival Biarritz Amérique Latine Cinémas & Cultures	Audience Award	Won	
7 Boxes	2015	Premio Cóndor de Plata	Best Film	Won	
The Gold Seekers	2018	Palm Springs International Film Festival	New Voices/New Visions Grand Jury Prize	Nominated	
The Gold Seekers	2018	Platino Awards	Best Original Score	Nominated	

=== Short films ===
- ‘‘El pueblo te necesita’’ (1976)
- ‘‘La indiferencia’’ (1977)
- ‘‘Napoleón’’ (1979)
- ‘‘Espacio’’ (1981)
- ‘‘Autorretrato’’ (1984)
- ‘‘24 horas en la vida de Brigitta von Scharkoppen’’ (1984), with Ricardo Migliorisi.
- ‘‘Caza de Brujas’’ (1984)
- ‘‘Artroscopia, investigación en Medicina’’ (1986)
- ‘‘Presos’’ (1987)
- ‘‘Bocetos’’ (1987)
- ‘‘Espejos’’ (1987)
- ‘‘Todos conocemos el final’’ (1988)
- ‘‘La Noche de San Blas’’ (1989)
- ‘‘Sobrevivencia’’ (1990)
- ‘‘La clase de órgano’’ (1990) with Tana Schémbori.
- ‘‘Artefacto de primera necesidad’’ (1995), with Tana Schémbori
- ‘‘Horno’’ (1998)
- ‘‘Ejercicios de estilo’’ (1999), US
- ‘‘Say Yes’’ (1999)
- ‘‘Vampiros en el IMA’’ (1999), con Tana Schémbori
- ‘‘Extraños vecinos’’ (1999), US
- ‘‘Tana Schémbori: Retrospectiva’’ (1999)
- ‘‘Villa Ko’eyu’’ (2000), with Tana Schémbori
- ‘‘La decisión de Nora’’ (2000), with Tana Schémbori
- ‘‘Amor-basura’’ (2000), with Tana Schémbori
- ‘‘La cartera’’ (2000), with Tana Schémbori
- ‘‘Tercer Timbre’’ (2001)
- ‘‘Horno ardiente’’ (2002), with Tana Schémbori
- ‘‘Cándida’’ (2003), with Tana Schémbori

=== TV ===
- ‘‘González vs Bonetti’’ (2005, Telefuturo), with Tana Schémbori
- ‘‘GvsB: La revancha’’ (2005, Telefuturo), with Tana Schémbori
- ‘‘La Chuchi’’ (2006, Canal 13), with Tana Schémbori

== See also ==
- Cinema of Paraguay
