= Aya Domenig =

Swiss filmmaker and anthropologist

- Born: 1972 (age 53–54); Kameoka, Kyoto, Kyoto Prefecture, Japan
- Occupations: Anthropologist and filmmaker
- Years active: 1999–present
- Notable work: Als die Sonne vom Himmel fiel

Aya Domenig (born 1972) is a filmmaker and anthropologist of Japanese–Swiss origin.

== Early life and education ==
Born in Kameoka, Kyoto, Kyoto Prefecture, Japan, Aya Domenig has joint Swiss and Japanese citizenships. Her mother is of Japanese origin while her father is Swiss. Her grandfather, Shigeru Doi, worked at the Hiroshima Red Cross Hospital after the atomic bombing of Hiroshima on 6 August 1945.

In 1976 Domenig's parents moved to Switzerland, where they lived in Kilchberg and in Zürich-Hottingen. She attended a gymnasium in Zürich, and from 1992 to 2000, she studied social anthropology, film studies, and japanology at the University of Zurich. Earning a Monbushô scholarship by the Government of Japan, Domenig attended the Hitotsubashi University in Tokyo from 1996 to 1997. Domenig's practical experiences include language stays in France and Japan at the Sendagaya Japanese Institute, she was in two internships, and also worked as translator. Domenig graduated with a degree in visual anthropology in 2000. In 2001, Domenig attended the film and video department at the ZHdK University Zürich where she graduated in 2005, after producing the short fiction film Haru Ichiban (Spring Storm) in co-operation with the Osaka University of Arts and Visual Media (Osaka Geijutsu Daigaku).

== Work ==
Aya Domenig published a social study treating the relevance of the Swiss novel Heidi in 2001, and in 2007 she participated a study related to the funeral culture on behalf of the government of the city of Zürich.

Aya Domenig's first documentary film was Oyakata - The Master, her graduation work in 1999, which was presented in 2000 and 2001 at film festivals in Austria, Germany, Switzerland, in the UK and USA. Her 2015 documentary film Als die Sonne vom Himmel fiel was supported by the Swiss film subsidy (Filmstiftung) of the Canton of Zürich for research and production, and produced by ican films gmbh and Schweizer Radio und Fernsehen (SRF). Since I was a teenager, I always wanted to know more about the background of my grandfather. Aya Domenig tells in her first feature film the fate of her grandfather who worked as doctor after the atomic bombing of Hiroshima on 6 August 1945 in a Red Cross hospital in Hiroshima. While researching her film in the Hiroshima Prefecture, on 11 March 2011 the Fukushima Daiichi nuclear disaster occurred, and Domenig decided to expand her project. The documentary film premiered at the Festival del film Locarno on 9 August 2015.

== Filmography (selected works) ==
Year	Title	Role	Notes
1999	Oyakata - Der Lehrmeister		as director
2002	Je t'aime		as director, writer and editor
2004	Ein Tor für die Revolution		as cinematographer
2004	Hitoritabi (Iio-san's Journey)		as director, writer and editor
2005	Haru Ichiban - Spring Storm		as director, editor and writer
2006	Zeit des Abschieds		as editor
2011	Mürners Universum		as writer
2015	Als die Sonne vom Himmel fiel	Herself	as director and writer

== Festivals ==
Oyakata:

- 2000: Internationales ethnografisches Filmfestival IWF, Göttingen, Germany.
- 2000: 7th International Festival of Ethnographic Film, London, England.
- 2001: 36th Solothurner Filmtage, Solothurn, Switzerland.
- 2001: University of Texas, Festival of Ethnographic Film, Texas, USA.

Je t’aime:

- 2002: Schweizerisches Film- und Videofestival Spiez, Spiez, Switzerland.
- 2002: Vevey Images `02, Vevey, Switzerland.
- 2002: Festival der Nationen, Ebensee, Austria.

Haru Ichiban:

- 2005: Locarno International Film Festival, Locarno, Switzerland.
- 2005: 'Internationale Kurzfilmtage, Winterthur, Switzerland.
- 2006: Solothurner Filmtage, Solothurn, Switzerland.
- 2006: Stuttgarter Filmwinter, Stuttgart, Germany.
- 2006: FIPA Biarritz, Biarritz, France.
- 2006: Premier Plans, Festival d’Angers, France.
- 2006: International Short Film Festival, Clermont-Ferrand, France.
- 2006: Worldwide Student Film Festival, Potsdam-Babelsberg, Germany.
- 2006: Festival du Film Court de Lille, France.
- 2006: Poitiers International Film Schools Festival, Poitiers, France.
- 2006: Mediawave International Film and Music Gathering, Hungary.

Als die Sonne vom Himmel fiel:

- List of related festivals

== Awards ==
- 2000: JVC Student Video Prize for Oyakata.
- 2002: Goldener Drachen („bemerkenswerter Spielfilm") for Je t’aime.
- 2006: Prix Cinécinéma (Premier Plans, Festival d’Angers) for Haru Ichiban.
- 2016: Swiss Film Award nomination Best Documentary Film and Best Film Score for Als die Sonne vom Himmel fiel.
- 2016: Swiss Film Award for Best Film Score (Beste Musik) for Marcel Vaid.
- 2016: Tokyo, Green Image Film Festival, Green Image Award for Als die Sonne vom Himmel fiel.
- 2016: Schwerin, Filmkunstfest Mecklenburg-Vorpommern, Special Mention for Als die Sonne vom Himmel fiel.
- 2016: Paris, Festival International Jean Rouch, Prix Mario Ruspoli for Als die Sonne vom Himmel fiel.
- 2016: Paris, Festival International Jean Rouch, Prix Anthropologie et Développement Durable for Als die Sonne vom Himmel fiel.
- 2016: Gilching, Fünf Seen Filmfestival, Horizonte Filmpreis for Als die Sonne vom Himmel fiel.
- 2016: Bozen, Bozner Filmtage, Lobende Erwähnung for Als die Sonne vom Himmel fiel.
- 2016: Bozcaada, Bozcaada International Festival of Ecological Documentary, Fethi Kayaalp Grand Prize - 2nd Prize for Als die Sonne vom Himmel fiel.

== Publications ==
- Aya Domenig: "'Cute Heidi'. Zur Rezeption von Heidi in Japan." In: Heidi. Karrieren einer Figur (p. 149-165). Offizin, Zürich 2001, ISBN 3-907496-09-4.

== Literature ==
- Ins Landesinnere und darüber hinaus. Perspektiven des Schweizer Dokumentarfilms – 14 Porträts. Published by Schweizer Feuilletondienst (SFD). Limmat Verlag, Zürich 2014, ISBN 978-3-85791-747-9.
