= Latas vacías =

- Directed by: Hérib Godoy
- Screenplay by: Hérib Godoy; Néstor Amarilla Ojeda
- Produced by: Miguel Rodriguez
- Starring: Aníbal Ortiz; Máximo Florentín; Antonia Florentín Medina
- Cinematography: Hérib Godoy
- Edited by: ONG Sociedad Cultural
- Music by: Mauro Acosta
- Release date: September 20, 2014 (IFF)
- Running time: 74 minutes
- Country: Paraguay
- Language: Guarani
- Budget: $6,000

Latas vacías, also known as Empty Cans, is a 2014 Paraguayan drama film co-written and directed by Hérib Godoy in his directorial debut.

An early version of the film premiered on 10 October 2013 during the International Film Festival in Asunción and this rough cut won the Premio del Centro Cultural de la República El Cabildo, which came with a financial prize that allowed Godoy to complete his filming.

== Production ==
A completed version of Latas vacías had its official premiere on 20 September 2014 at that year's International Film Festival in Asunción.

Latas vacías is based on two short films, Accounts (2010) and Pescadape (2011), both of which were written by Hérib Godoy and also featured Aníbal Ortiz. Filming took place in Coronel Oviedo beginning in mid-October 2012 and ended on April 12, 2014, making it the first feature film shot in the city. Within the film's first four weeks of release it sold 2,120 tickets.

== Synopsis ==
Alfonso (Aníbal Ortiz) is a treasure hunter that focuses his hunts on lost treasures of the Paraguayan War. However he's forced to flee a dig and ends up in Coronel Oviedo, a city that makes it survival by serving as a recycling landfill.

== Cast ==
- Aníbal Ortiz as Alfonso
- Antonia Florentín Medina as Verónica
- Máximo Florentín as Atilio
- Fátima Aquino
- Sergio Cardozo
- Blas Filártiga
- Dani Gamarra
- Arturo Ortiz
- Miguel Rodríguez

== Reception ==
ABC Color wrote a favorable review for Latas vacías, noting that it had a "simple but compelling story" and praising it for making the most of the cast and crew's limited experience and resources.

== Awards ==
- Premio del Centro Cultural de la República El Cabildo (2013, won)
- 22º Festival Internacional de Cine a la Mejor Película Paraguaya en Proceso de Terminación (2013, won)
- Panambí Award for Best Picture at the International Film Festival in Asunción (2014, won)
