= Paz Encina =

Paraguayan director and screenwriter

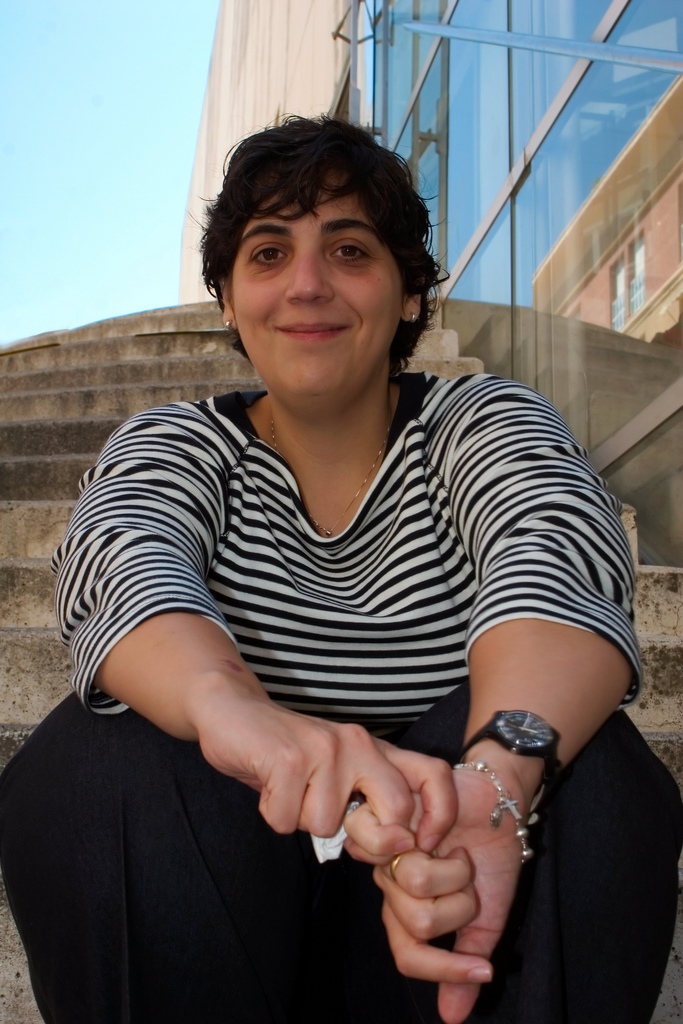
- Born: July 9, 1971 (age 54); Asunción, Paraguay
- Occupations: Film director, screenwriter
- Years active: Since 2000

Paz Encina (born July 9, 1971) is a Paraguayan director and screenwriter, known for her drama film Hamaca paraguaya (2006), winner of the FIPRESCI Award of the Cannes Film Festival.

== Biography ==
She was born in Asunción, Paraguay. She studied at the Universidad del Cine of Buenos Aires, where she obtained a bachelor's degree in cinematography. From 2002 to 2003 she taught classes at the University of Asunción and at the Paraguayan Art Academy.

Hamaca paraguaya was her first feature film. She previously made short films like La siesta (1997), Los encantos del Jazmín (1998) and Supe que estabas triste (2000).

Encina's feature film Hamaca paraguaya (2006) won the FIPRESCI Award at the Cannes Film Festival. Her second feature film Ejercicios de memoria (2016) appeared at the MoMA.

== Filmography ==
As director

- Hamaca paraguaya – short film, 2000
- Supe que estabas triste – 2000
- Hamaca paraguaya – feature film, 2006
- EAMI – 2022

As screenwriter

- Hamaca paraguaya – 2000
- Supe que estabas triste – 2000
- Hamaca paraguaya – 2006
- EAMI – 2022
