= Arami Ullón =

Paraguayan film director (born 1978)

Arami Ullon
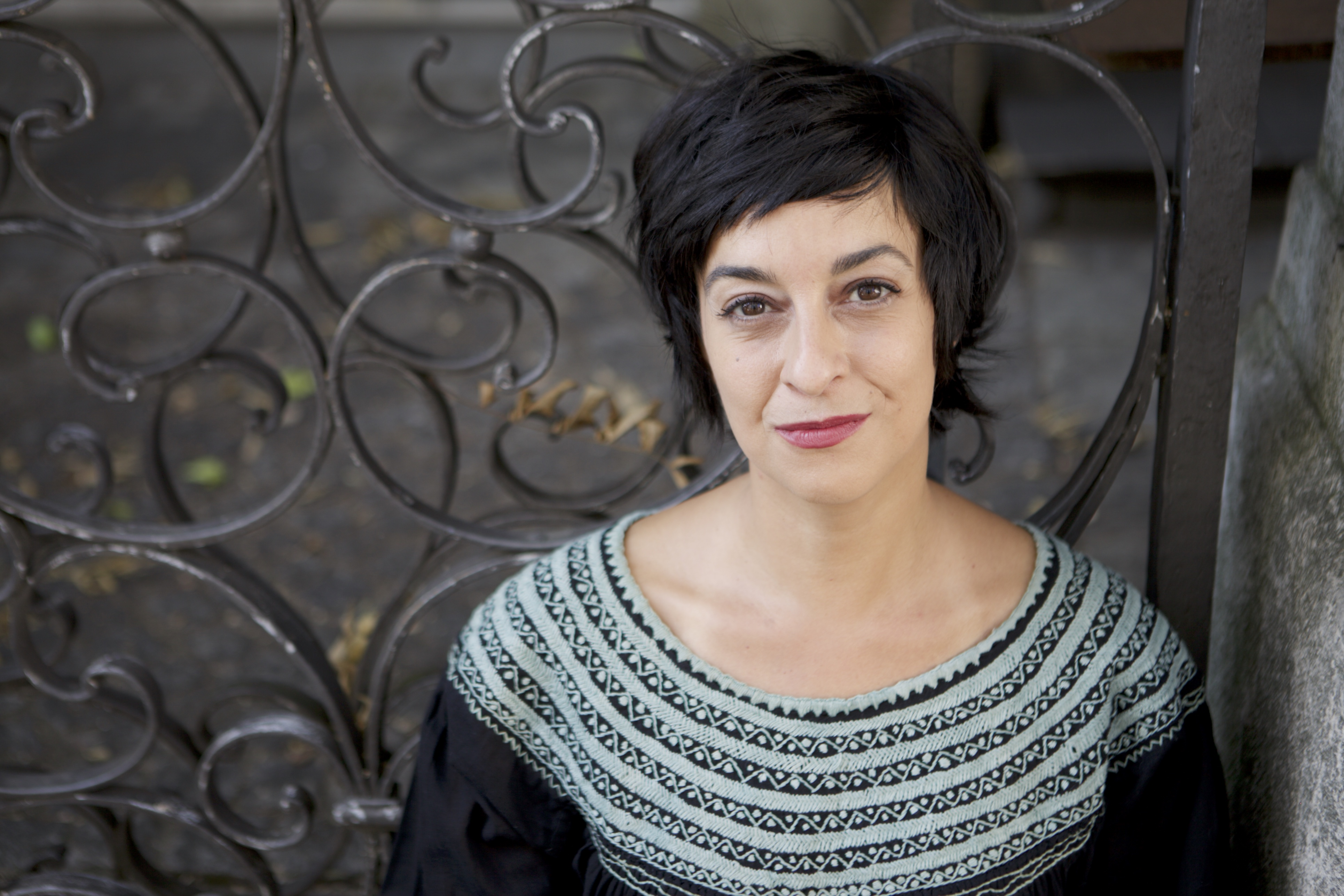
- Born: Arami Ullón Villalba; October 3, 1978 (age 47); Asunción, Paraguay
- Occupations: Film director, writer, producer,
- Notable work: Cloudy Times, Nothing but the Sun

Arami Ullón (born October 3, 1978) is a Paraguayan film director, producer and writer. She is the author of the awarded documentary Cloudy Times. She lives in Switzerland and Paraguay. Ullón started her career at age 16, and she is considered a pioneer and innovator in the movie industry in Paraguay.

== Early life ==
Arami Ullón Villalba was born in Asunción on October 3, 1978. grew up in Asunción. Her parents, Mirna Villalba and Luis Ullón, separated when she was still very young, with her as the only child of their union. Arami was raised by her mother, who was affected by Parkinson's disease and epilepsy, and her childhood memories are tinted by the experience of dealing with her mother's disease. Because of her mother's condition, Arami also grew up under the care of her grandmother, Maria Olinda Alonso.

Her beginnings in the field started almost by accident when she was sixteen years old. She auditioned for a TV show, Via Libre, but was not selected for it since the audition didn't go well at all. She tells she actually froze in front of the camera. However, she was hired as a production assistant of this show.

Arami states that her training in film making and audiovisual production is highly empirical. Nevertheless, she has obtained a scholarship to study hands- on film making in the Boston Film and Video Foundation.

== Career ==
During her childhood and early adolescence, Paraguay was under the dictatorship of Alfredo Stroessner, who ruled over the country for 35 consecutive years. The oppressive culture of the dictatorship influenced her desire to open conversations about democracy among young people.

In 1998 Ullón directed a radio show in an innovative station called Rock and Pop. The show was live for two hours every night and had an erotic theme. The show aired erotic stories written by Ullón and voluntary collaborators, and the audience was encouraged to share their stories, fantasies, or experiences over the phone. This kind of show had no precedent in the Paraguayan Radio. That same year, she produced her first short movie. Ullón was 19 years old when she directed her first film, Absence of an Own Name (Original title in Spanish: Ausencia de un nombre propio).

Continuing her career as a producer, she also worked on music videos, TV ads, the production of shows for children as “Lori Club”. Two years later, she directed the film Béckon, also in Paraguay.

Along with Mario Ferreiro, Ullón promoted the arts in a club called El Café de la Iguana by presenting live music and organizing art exhibitions. In 2001, Ullón embarked on an even more ambitious initiative to facilitate the conversations about social themes and promote the arts: La Plazita presented up to five events every week featuring movies, art exhibitions, live music, or plays.

Her career continued developing in production companies both in Latin America and Europe. In 2008, she moved to Palma de Mallorca, Spain, where she continued her career as a producer in Palma Pictures.

In 2006, she began working in the production of the film 18 Cigarrillos y Medio with Marcelo Tolces. This film was released in 2011. Following, in 2011, she began the production of her highly acclaimed and awarded personal documentary, Cloudy Times, which was presented in 2014. Cloudy times is the first Paraguayan movie selected to be submitted for the Oscar Academy Awards.

In 2020, she released her new production, Nothing but the Sun (Spanish: Apenas el sol). This documentary illustrates the struggles of the indigenous Ayoreo "an unequal battle in which the Ayoreo have to deal with financial pressures that threaten to prolong their agony indefinitely. Forced to leave their ancestral lands in spite of the Paraguayan laws granting them rights, the Ayoreo often find themselves in hostile urban contexts to which they are unable to adapt, which reject them and push them towards marginalisation."

Ullón also wrote a book about gender violence, About Abuse and Other Relatives (Original Title in Spanish: Sobre abusos y otros parientes). She also works as a narrative consultant for several swiss directors.

Ullón is a member of the Paraguayan Film Academy and a member of the European Film Academy.

== Personal life ==
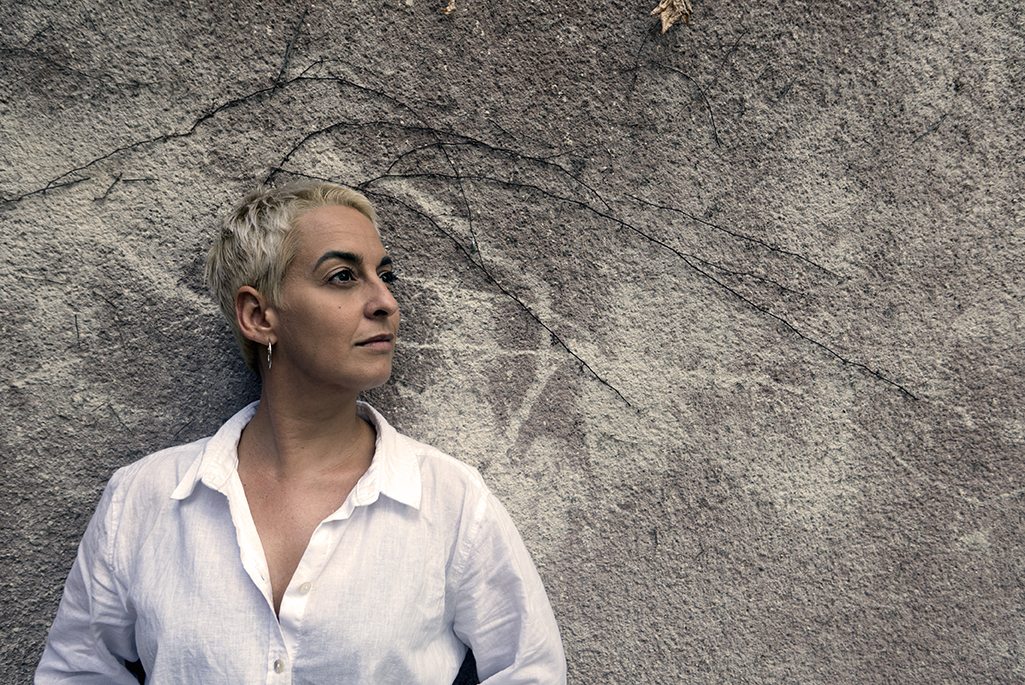
Portrait of Arami Ullón

Ullón lives and works in Asunción, Paraguay, and Basel, Switzerland with her partner Patrick Oser.

== Social themes ==
Ullón's work is highly tinted with social tones and brings attention over matters that deserve debate and awareness.

Even though conversations about democracy were regarded as taboo and highly subversive during the dictatorship era, Arami worked in the production of the first TV show that offered public debate on social and political subjects in Paraguay.

Her first film Absence of an Own Name (Ausencia de un nombre propio), discussed a teenager's sexuality as a natural an transcendental part of her being. At the time of the release of the film, some sectors of the society found this movie challenging and immoral, and it was taken out of movie theaters.

Cloudy Times presents several layers and themes in the Paraguayan society. Gender roles and expectations, social security of the lack thereof, and the precarious system of care for elderly citizens.

Nothing but the Sun illustrates the distressing story from the Ayoreo people, who are systematically discriminated against, traumatically uprooted, denied of their cultural heritage.

Arami has produced this film was co-produced by Paraguay and Switzerland. She has been very vocal about the lack of structures and opportunities to produce films in her country of origin. Among other Paraguayan filmmakers the organization Creadores PY was founded as an organization for screenwriters and directors in the country.

She is an active member of the Paraguayan Film Academy.

== Filmography - A selection ==
Year	Title	Media	Notes	Country
1994	Via Libre	Television	Production Assistant	Paraguay
1997	El Toque del Oboe	Film	Production Assistant	Paraguay, Brazil
1998	Absence of an Own Name	Short Film	Writer, producer, director	Paraguay
2000	Bekon	Short Film	Director	Paraguay
2005	Miami Vice	Film	Production coordinator in Paraguay & Set production assistant	United States
2006	Lory Club	Television	Production Coordinator	Paraguay
2011	18 cigarrillos y medio	Film	Producer	Spain, Mexico, Paraguay
2013	Det grå guld	Film	Bidding Producer - Palma Pictures	Spain
2014	Cloudy Times	Film	Writer, co-producer, director	Switzerland, Paraguay
2020	Nothing But the Sun	Film	Writer, co-producer, director	Switzerland, Paraguay
