= Extraterritorial abduction =

Non-extradition abduction of citizens

Extraterritorial abduction, also known as international abduction, is the practice of one country abducting someone from another country's territory outside the legal process of extradition. Extraordinary rendition is a form of extraterritorial abduction involving transfer to a third country. Extraterritorial abduction with the purpose of bringing the person to trial in the abducting country is contrary to international law.

== By country ==
=== China ===
Over the past two decades, China has carried out a controversial and far-reaching campaign of transnational repression, aimed at forcibly returning citizens it considers criminals from abroad. This campaign, often framed by Beijing as a program of “voluntary repatriation” or a crackdown on alleged fugitives who have allegedly escaped overseas, has raised serious concerns among human rights organizations, foreign governments, and international legal experts. Reports indicate that more than 3,000 individuals have been targeted under this initiative, many of whom were living in foreign countries such as Australia, Southeast Asia, and various Western nations.

In practice, the program has often gone far beyond standard extradition processes or formal requests through legal channels. Instead, there have been repeated accusations of covert operations involving intimidation, harassment, and in some cases outright abductions of Chinese citizens residing overseas. Victims of these practices have sometimes vanished without warning, only to reappear later in China under government custody, often accused of crimes such as corruption, espionage, or political dissent.

Several high-profile cases illustrate the gravity of this issue. In 2002, Wang Bingzhang, a pro-democracy activist and critic of the Chinese Communist Party, was abducted from Vietnam. According to international observers, he was taken against his will and transported across the border into China, where he was later sentenced to life imprisonment on charges of espionage and terrorism. His case drew worldwide condemnation, not only because of the circumstances of his capture but also due to widespread concerns that his trial failed to meet international standards of fairness and transparency.

Another striking example is that of Gui Minhai, a Swedish citizen and Hong Kong bookseller known for publishing works critical of Chinese political leaders. In 2015, Gui disappeared from his apartment in Thailand. It was later revealed that he had been abducted and transported back to China. His detention became a major diplomatic incident, straining China's relations with Sweden and fueling fears about Beijing's willingness to ignore international borders when pursuing individuals it deems threatening to its authority.

Then there's the case of Dong Guangping, a former Chinese police officer turned pro-democracy dissident, fled with his family to Thailand in 2015. Even with UN-recognized refugee status, he was arrested in Bangkok, allegedly after immigration fines were surreptitiously paid by Chinese authorities, and was returned to China, where he was jailed for three years. He eventually resettled in Canada.

Also, there was the case of Jiang Yefei, a political cartoonist and activist, was also arrested in Thailand and sent to China alongside Dong. Jiang had fled torture and detention in China and played a key role in assisting fellow dissidents to flee.

In addition, Bao Zhuoxuan, a 16-year-old student, was intercepted near the Myanmar-China border while attempting to escape. He was sent back to China and placed under surveillance, while his parents faced charges of political subversion.

But also, there were cases where the Chinese police failed. One of these cases happened in March 2024, when Ling Huazhan, a 26-year-old Chinese dissident who had fled to Europe, was nearly forcefully repatriated from Paris, France by Chinese operatives. The attempt was thwarted by French officials at the Charles de Gaulle International Airport, leading France to expel two Chinese officials.

Beyond these individual cases, other countries have reported multiple cases where Chinese operations have allegedly targeted residents of Chinese origin through what the Chinese government calls overseas police stations, or overseas 110, which references China's emergency number 110. Reports suggest that some individuals have been pressured or coerced into returning to China, often through threats to their families back home or persistent harassment campaigns. This raises profound questions about sovereignty, the safety of diaspora communities, and the reach of Chinese state power far beyond its own territory.

Other dissidents in Thailand, Australia and other countries experienced widespread intimidation: surveillance, emailed compromises, cyber intrusions, and a pervasive atmosphere of fear among expatriates, making even refugee camps feel unsafe.

While Chinese authorities defend the program as an effort to bring what the Chinese government calls fugitives, critics argue that it is instead a tool of political repression designed to silence dissent, control exiles, and expand Beijing's influence abroad. The lack of transparency, the absence of due process, and the documented use of intimidation tactics point to a pattern that undermines the principles of international law.

As the international community continues to grapple with the implications of these operations, these cases symbolize a growing challenge to global norms of national sovereignty, justice, and human rights.

=== Colombia ===
Rodrigo Granda was abducted from Venezuela to Colombia in 2004.

=== Czechoslovakia ===
During the first years of the Cold War until the 1960s, Czechoslovakia's secret service, the StB, abducted defectors overseas. One victim was the Social Democratic politician Bohumil Lausman, abducted from Austria in 1953 by Czechoslovak agents abusing diplomatic immunity.

=== France ===
France abducted Antoine Argoud from West Germany in 1963.

=== Iran ===
In July 2020, the regime of the Islamic Republic of Iran abducted Jamshid Sharmahd, who was also a German citizen and US permanent resident, while he was transiting in Dubai, United Arab Emirates. The regime accused him of involvement in the 2008 Shiraz bombing and other plots. However, his family and rights groups called the proceedings a sham, noting incommunicado detention, lack of chosen counsel, and medical neglect. He was sentenced to death in February 2023, and the sentence was upheld. Sharmahd was executed by the Iranian regime on 28 October 2024. Germany’s foreign minister Annalena Baerbock called it a scandal, and the German government recalled the German ambassador from Tehran. The European Union also condemned the execution. Germany expelled two Iranian diplomats, and also ordered all three Iranian consulates in Germany closed, with those being the Iranian consulates in Frankfurt, Hamburg, and Munich. Only the Iranian embassy in Berlin was allowed by Germany to remain open. EU institutions weighed further measures.

The United States Department of the Treasury later cited his kidnapping and forced return to Iran as a notable case of transnational repression practiced by the Iranian regime.

On 9 October 2020, Habib Chaab, who had been living in exile in Sweden for 14 years and had citizenship there, traveled from Sweden to Istanbul, where, according to a Turkish investigation and security sources, he was lured in a honey trap, drugged, and abducted by a network acting on behalf of Iranian intelligence, then forcibly brought back and smuggled to Iran by agents of the Iranian regime. Turkish media and officials later said Iranian intelligence was behind the kidnapping, abduction and forced return to Iran, and Turkish authorities detained 11 people linked to the plot. The Iranian regime accused Chaab of being a leader/founder associated with the Arab Struggle Movement for the Liberation of Ahwaz (ASMLA), and of involvement in attacks attributed to ASMLA by the Iranian regime, including a 2018 attack in Ahvaz. Chaab was executed on 6 May 2023, resulting in serious diplomatic fallout. The execution prompted condemnation from Sweden and the European Union. Sweden summoned Iran's acting ambassador and the EU issued a statement condemning the execution of Chaab, and the EU reiterated its opposition to capital punishment. The Swedish Ministry of Foreign Affairs said that the death penalty was an inhuman and irreversible punishment and condemned its use by Iran. Meanwhile, the EU said that the death penalty violates the inalienable right to life enshrined in the Universal Declaration of Human Rights and is, in their words, the ultimate cruel, inhuman and degrading punishment.

The EU also shed light on the increasing number of EU nationals arbitrarily detained in Iran, the restrictions imposed on consular access to EU nationals, the denial of consular protection and the right to a fair trial.

=== Israel ===
Israel abducted Nazi war criminal Adolf Eichmann from Argentina in 1960, nuclear whistleblower Mordechai Vanunu from Italy in 1986, and Dirar Abu Seesi from Ukraine in 2011.

=== South Africa ===
During the apartheid era, the Security Branch and South African Defence Force frequently carried out cross-border abductions to kidnap anti-apartheid activists from neighbouring states. The report of the Truth and Reconciliation Commission detailed abductions from the 1960s through the 1980s, occurring in Lesotho, Swaziland, Botswana, Zambia and Mozambique. Many abductees were tortured, forced to become informants (askaris), or murdered. Some were brought to criminal trial. In 1991, during the transition to democracy, the Appellate Division found in the case of S v Ebrahim that the courts had no jurisdiction to try defendants who had been abducted from foreign countries by agents of the government.

=== Saudi Arabia ===
Prince Sultan bin Turki bin Abdulaziz, Jamal Ahmad Khashoggi, and many other critics of the Saudi authorities have been abducted and then murdered or rendered against their will to Saudi Arabia since 1979.

=== South Korea ===
Isang Yun was abducted from West Germany in 1967 and taken to South Korea, but he returned to West Germany in 1969.

=== Turkey ===
Kosovo, Gabon, Sudan, the Republic of Moldova, Azerbaijan, Ukraine, Malaysia, Switzerland and Mongolia: Turkish nationals connected with the opposition Gülen movement have been abducted and forcibly returned to Turkey without extradition proceedings.

In March 2018, six Turkish nationals from Kosovo had been captured by Turkish intelligence and brought to Turkey over alleged links to schools financed by the Gulen movement. Turkish President Recep Tayyip Erdoğan said in a speaking to supporters and party members in Istanbul: “Our National Intelligence Agency captured six of the highest ranking members (of Gulen’s network) in the Balkans in the operation it conducted in Kosovo,”

=== United States ===
In June 1950, Morton Sobell, an American engineer convicted in 1951 for conspiring with Julius and Ethel Rosenberg to commit espionage, fled with his family to Mexico, seeking to evade authorities following David Greenglass’s arrest. However, on August 16, 1950, Sobell and his family, who had been living under false identities, were abducted, transported to the U.S. border, and handed over to the FBI, leading to his subsequent arrest and prosecution.

The first well-known American rendition case involved the Achille Lauro hijackers in 1985. After they were given a plane and were en route in international air space, they were forced by United States Navy fighter planes to land at the Naval Air Station Sigonella, an Italian military base in Sicily used by the US Navy and NATO. The intent was to bring the hijackers within judicial reach of United States government representatives for transport to and trial in the United States.

In September 1987, during the Reagan administration, the United States executed a rendition, code-named "Goldenrod," in a joint FBI-CIA operation. Agents lured Fawaz Yunis, wanted for his role in the hijacking of a Jordanian airliner that had American citizens on board, onto a boat off the coast of Cyprus and taken to international waters, where he was arrested.

The Reagan administration did not undertake this kidnapping lightly. Then-FBI Director William H. Webster had opposed an earlier bid to snatch Yunis, arguing that the United States should not adopt the tactics of Israel, which had abducted Adolf Eichmann on a residential street in Buenos Aires, Argentina, in 1960 ... In 1984 and 1986, during a wave of terrorist attacks, Congress passed laws making air piracy and attacks on Americans abroad federal crimes. Ronald Reagan added teeth to these laws by signing a secret covert-action directive in 1986 that authorized the CIA to kidnap, anywhere abroad, foreigners wanted for terrorism. A new word entered the dictionary of U.S. foreign relations: rendition.

In 1990, Humberto Álvarez-Machaín, a Mexican physician, was accused of assisting in the torture and murder of DEA agent Enrique "Kiki" Camarena in 1985. The DEA allegedly hired local collaborators who abducted him from his Guadalajara office on April 2, 1990. Reports indicate he was sedated and electrically shocked before being flown to El Paso, Texas, where U.S. agents arrested him. At the trial, the indictment was ultimately dismissed due to insufficient evidence, and Álvarez-Machaín was acquitted and returned to Mexico. The Supreme Court later ruled in United States v. Álvarez-Machaín (1992) that forcible abduction, even if it violates an extradition treaty, does not bar trial in U.S. courts, reaffirming the Ker–Frisbie doctrine. Subsequently, Álvarez-Machaín filed civil suits against the US government and individuals involved under the Federal Tort Claims Act and the Alien Tort Statute. The lower courts found some liability under the Alien Tort Statute for the Mexican collaborator, José Francisco Sosa; however, Supreme Court review in Sosa v. Álvarez-Machaín (2004) rejected broader remedies.

On May 28, 2010, Konstantin Yaroshenko, a Russian pilot, was abducted in Monrovia, Liberia by DEA agents, and taken to New York, where he was prosecuted and, in 2011, sentenced to 20 years in U.S. prison. However, Yaroshenko was released in 2022 in exchange for Trevor Reed.

On January 3, 2026, Nicolás Maduro, sitting president of Venezuela, was abducted from or near his safe house in Caracas by U.S. Army Delta Force with CIA support. U.S. had not recognized Maduro as the leader of Venezuela since 2019, and in 2020, Maduro was accused of working with guerrilla groups to smuggle drugs to the U.S. in a "narco-terrorism" conspiracy. The official justification given for Maduro's capture centered around these charges, although comments by Trump suggest Maduro's defiance of U.S. oil interests in Venezuela played a role in the decision.

=== Vietnam ===
In July 2017, the former Vietnamese politician and businessman Trịnh Xuân Thanh was secretly abducted and kidnapped in Berlin by a group of unnamed Vietnamese personnel believed to be Vietnamese agents in Germany, and taken to Vietnam. Germany expelled two Vietnamese diplomats in response. Vietnam sentenced him to life imprisonment on 22 January 2018.
