= Machaín =

Machaín or Machain is a surname. Notable people with the surname include:

- Facundo Machaín (1845–1877), President of Paraguay
- Humberto Álvarez Machaín, physician from Mexico accused of aiding in the torture and killing of Enrique Camarena Salazar in 1985

== See also ==
- Sosa v. Alvarez-Machain, a cause of action must be universally recognized by the law of nations as a prohibited norm in order to be actionable
- United States v. Alvarez-Machain, 504 U.S. 655 (1992), decision by the United States Supreme Court
