= SERVIZ =

Online platform for home repair services

- Release: 2014
- Available in: English
- Type: Commerce, home repair
- Website: www.serviz.com

SERVIZ is an online platform for booking home repair and maintenance services launched in 2014. Customers can schedule services from pre-screened local technicians on-demand using the company website or its iPhone mobile app. The business model is similar to Uber.

== History ==
SERVIZ was founded by Michael Kline and Zorik Gordon, formerly of ReachLocal. Zorik and Kline started a spinoff company in 2012 called Club Local which was located in the Dallas metro area. Club Local was part of ReachLocal.

Zorik Gordon stepped down as CEO of ReachLocal in September 2013. Gordon and Kline changed the name and re-launched the company as SERVIZ in Los Angeles in 2014.

== Funding ==
SERVIZ received $10.7 million in February 2014. A large percentage of the investment came from Groupon, Inc.

== Services ==
The company offers Handyman, Plumbing, Carpet Cleaning, Appliance Repair, through its iPhone App and Website.
