= Self-help (law) =

Exercise of rights without higher authority

Self-help, in the context of a legal doctrine, refers to individuals exercising their rights without resorting to legal writs or consulting higher authorities. This occurs, for example, when a financial institution repossesses a car on which it holds both the title and a defaulted note. Individuals may resort to self-help when they retrieve property under the unauthorized control of another person or abate nuisances, such as using sandbags and ditches to protect land from flooding.

A self-help eviction refers to a commercial landlord's common law right to peaceably reenter their property to evict a defaulting tenant or other person with no right of possession.

== Degrees of limitation ==
The legal system places varying degrees of limitation on self-help, and laws vary widely among different jurisdictions. Often, self-help is allowed as long as no law is broken and no breach of the peace occurs (or is likely to occur). Additionally, the usual limit on liability for actions of an agent does not apply; if one uses an agent, such as an independent contractor, to perform the self-help action, the principal will be held strictly liable if anything goes wrong. Courts often place stricter limits on the repossession of certain types of merchandise and on the eviction of tenants. Creditors and landlords who resort to self-help in such situations are prone to tort liability and, in some jurisdictions, to criminal liability.

== MBank El Paso v. Sanchez ==
A famous case, MBank El Paso v. Sanchez 836 S.W.2d 151 (Tex. 1992), was heard by the Texas Supreme Court. Sanchez was the registered owner of a vehicle on which MBank El Paso was the lienholder. When a tow truck operator hired by the bank attempted to repossess the vehicle, Sanchez locked herself in the car. Despite this, the tow truck operator hooked the car up to the tow truck and proceeded to drive it, with Sanchez still inside, at high speed to the lot where it was left, guarded by a junkyard dog. It required the combined efforts of Sanchez's boyfriend and the police to allow her to escape the impound lot. In a subsequent trial, the repossession was declared unlawful and reversed, and the bank was held liable for $1,250,000 in damages to Sanchez, even though the unlawful action was taken by the tow truck operator, who was not an employee of the bank. The court held that the bank had a "non-delegable duty not to breach the peace," meaning that any breach of the peace—whether by the debtor, the creditor, or even an independent contractor acting on behalf of the creditor—is considered the fault of the creditor.

== Lack of judicial remedy ==
In a broader sense, self-help can also refer to individuals taking the law into their own hands, often through violence or other illegal behavior. This can lead to factions forming around the disputing parties and potentially broad civil conflict.

Historically, self-help has been regarded as the recourse for injured parties when no courts are available to accept jurisdiction. The dangers of self-help are often cited as arguments against allowing situations where people feel they have no judicial path to a remedy or believe the courts are too corrupt to render just decisions. This is one of the main reasons why impartial courts are established.

California has recognized the dangers of self-help evictions by landlords, which can result in tenants, landlords, and innocent bystanders being injured or killed. Due to the heavy caseloads of courts, civil litigants can be required to wait months or years for a trial date. The State of California gives landlord-tenant cases priority over all other cases except for criminal trials and trials where the plaintiff or defendant is over 70 years of age. (Note: California Civil Code, Sec. 36. In one case, a plaintiff over 70 years of age had to sue the Superior Court of Santa Clara County to get a courtroom to try his case after two years of continuances. Miller v. Superior Court (Simpson) (1990), [221 Cal. App. 3d 1202].)

== United States v. Alvarez-Machain ==
One of the more famous examples of self-help occurred in 1985, after the murder of Enrique Camarena Salazar, a Drug Enforcement agent, in Mexico. In response, the U.S. Government hired mercenaries to kidnap Humberto Álvarez Machaín, a local doctor suspected of involvement in the murder, and bring him to the United States to face trial without formally requesting his extradition from the Mexican government. The original trial court deemed such action illegal. However, the United States Supreme Court ruled that the self-help extradition of Machaín from Mexico was legal, despite the existence of an extradition treaty between the U.S. and Mexico. (Note: United States v. Alvarez-Machain, 504 U.S. 655, 657 (1992).) In the subsequent trial, Machaín was acquitted.

== See also ==
- Repair and deduct, a related principle within the context of landlord–tenant law
