= Eugene Woodworth =

American ballet dancer (1928–2013)

- Born: August 13, 1928
- Died: December 21, 2013 (aged 85)
- Occupation: Ballet dancer
- Spouse: Eric Marcoux (m. 2013)

Eugene Woodworth (August 13, 1928 – December 21, 2013) was a professional ballet dancer who married his partner Eric Marcoux (born 1931) in 2013, after 60 years together.

== Biography ==
Eugene Woodworth met Eric Marcoux through a mutual friend on June 13, 1953, in Chicago. Woodworth was a professional ballet dancer, and Marcoux had just left a Trappist monastery. Woodworth later became an in-house repairman for Tektronix, while Eric taught art and Tibetan Buddhism. Later in life, they participated in Friendly House's Gay and Grey program. They lived in northwest Portland, Oregon.

Woodworth hoped to pass his Social Security benefits to Marcoux. When Woodworth was diagnosed with congestive heart failure and given just weeks to live, he decided to marry Marcoux, even if gay marriage was not yet legal in Oregon. They married in Washington at Clark County Courthouse on December 13, 2013.
