= Kidnapping of Sidney Jaffe =

Canadian kidnapping case (1924–2005)

Sidney Jaffe
- Born: Sidney Leonard Jaffe; 22 December 1924; Manhattan, New York, U.S.
- Died: 16 July 2005 (aged 80)
- Occupation: Economist

Sidney Leonard Jaffe (22 December 1924 – 16 July 2005) was an American-born Canadian businessman who was kidnapped from outside his Toronto home in 1981 by American bounty hunters Timm Johnsen and Daniel Kear and transported to Florida after failing to appear for a trial there on charges of land sales fraud. His conviction on the fraud charges was overturned on appeal; his conviction on an additional charge of failure to appear for trial was upheld, but he was paroled after two years and returned to Canada. At the request of the Canadian government, Jaffe declined to appear at a new Florida trial on further land fraud charges in 1985. Johnsen and Kear were extradited to Canada and convicted of kidnapping in 1986, but were set free pending appeal, and their sentences were reduced to time served in 1989, after which they returned to the United States. The Jaffe incident caused significant tensions in Canada–United States relations, and resulted in a 1988 exchange of letters between the two countries on cross-border kidnappings.

== Background ==
Sidney Leonard Jaffe was born in Manhattan on 22 December 1924. A native of New York, and moved to Canada in the early 1970s. In Canada, he worked as an international economist. After his move, he also continued to do business in the United States. He was involved in land deals in Putnam County, Florida as an employee of the Atlantic Commercial Development Corporation. Jaffe sought purchasers for subdivided lots of land, but due to a dispute with the original holder of the mortgage on the lots, Jaffe issued quitclaim deeds rather than warranty deeds to purchasers. In August 1980, Jaffe was arrested on twenty-eight counts of violating the Florida Land Sales Practices Act. Accredited Surety & Casualty posted a US$137,500 bail bond for him. Jaffe then returned to Canada and applied to naturalise as a Canadian citizen. He failed to appear at his May 1981 trial, and was tried in absentia.

=== Kidnapping and conviction ===
AS&C faced forfeiture of its bail bond if Jaffe were not returned in 90 days. As a result, AS&C employee Daniel Kear, along with independent bounty hunter Timm Johnsen, then traveled to Canada in pursuit of Jaffe. In September 1981, they intercepted Jaffe at his apartment building as he returned from jogging, and took him in their car back to the United States. Jaffe later testified that Johnsen and Kear threatened him to obtain his cooperation, telling him that his daughter would be harmed if he did not cooperate and that they could return him to Florida "dead or alive", while attorneys for Johnsen and Kear claimed that Jaffe cooperated willingly because of the bail bond agreement.

In November 1981, Jaffe was convicted on the land fraud counts and an additional count of failure to appear for trial.

=== Legality and reaction ===
This assertion of jurisdiction by the Florida court over Jaffe despite his illegal kidnapping from a foreign state was an example of the controversial legal doctrine of male captus bene detentus. In U.S. law, this doctrine goes back to the 1886 Supreme Court case Ker v. Illinois, in which Ker was accused of embezzling funds from a Chicago bank and fled to Lima, Peru. Extradition papers had been drawn up, but it was difficult to actually effect extradition due to the Chilean occupation of the city in the ongoing War of the Pacific, and so two detectives simply abducted Ker and brought him to Illinois. The Supreme Court ruled that the kidnapping had not violated Ker's right to due process as long as he had been properly indicted and tried. At the time of Jaffe's kidnapping, the U.S. recognized only limited exceptions to the general rule in Ker; specifically, in the 1932 case Cook v. United States, the Supreme Court had ruled that where a treaty provision sets explicit territorial limits to jurisdiction, seizure or arrest in violation of that provision meant that a court could not exercise jurisdiction over the defendant so seized or arrested. In that case, the U.S. Coast Guard had seized a British vessel at sea for liquor smuggling 11.5 miles (18.5 km) off the coast of Massachusetts, beyond the "one-hour sailing limit" within which the Coast Guard could legally seize the vessel under the relevant 1924 U.K.–U.S. treaty, and the court ordered that the vessel be released to its owners. However, as Kathryn Selleck of Boston College Law School observed, the U.S.' extradition treaty with Canada did not explicitly state that the U.S. had no jurisdiction in Canadian territory, and so Jaffe would not be able to avail himself of the Cook exception as a defence.

Johnsen and Kear's actions provoked international outrage, pitting Canada's sovereignty against Florida's desire to punish what it believed was fraud. As an August 1982 editorial in The Montreal Gazette put it, "no matter how it turns out, justice may be served only at the cost of an injustice".

== Conviction overturned, Jaffe faces new charges ==
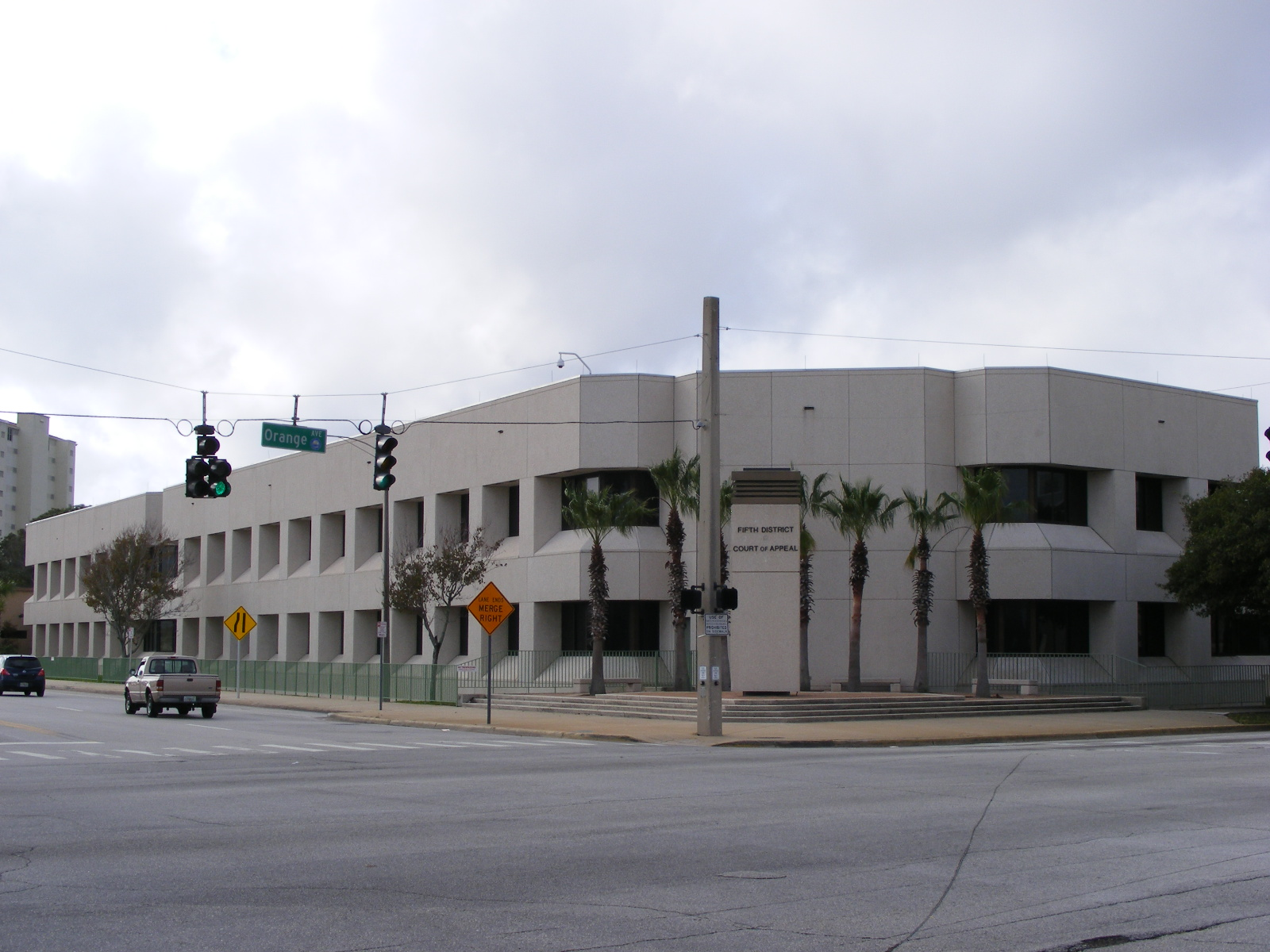
The Florida Fifth District Court of Appeal overturned Jaffe's land fraud charges, but upheld the other charge of failure to appear for trial.

In September 1983, the Florida Fifth District Court of Appeal overturned Jaffe's conviction on the land fraud charges on the two grounds that the prosecutors had made paperwork errors and that the judge below had misdirected the jury. However, by that time State Attorney Stephen Boyles had already filed a new organized fraud charge. In August 1983, Jaffe's lawyer Daniel Dearing filed a motion in state court to dismiss the new fraud charges, stating that they were "filed in bad faith without probable cause in order to hold the defendant and frustrate his release on parole or upon bond during pendency of his appeal". Similarly, Jaffe stated to the Orlando Sentinel that Boyles had only filed the new charges because he feared Jaffe would win his appeal. Dearing's motion argued that the evidence on which the new charges were based was already known at the time of Jaffe's 1982 trial, and if it had been included in the original charges the defence would have moved for consolidation of charges. Jaffe had served nineteen months of his sentence on the charge of failure to appear for trial, and would soon be paroled, as Putnam County continued to hold Jaffe pending determination of bail on the fraud charges.

In October 1983, Judge Edwin Sanders of the Seventh Judicial Circuit Court of Florida approved a US$150,000 bond for Jaffe on the new fraud charge. Rather than a bail bondsman, the bail bond was backed by a letter of credit from the Florida State Bank in Tallahassee; Boyles stated, "It is unusual for a bank to become a surety. I wouldn't think they would do that unless they had some sort of proof that it was salted away, so to speak". Soon after his release from Avon Park Correctional Institution, Jaffe returned to Toronto and was reunited with his wife and daughter. However, the following month, Sanders declined to dismiss the new fraud charge. Jaffe did not return to Florida for an October 1984 bankruptcy hearing, at which a judge granted a motion by attorney Terrance Schmidt that Jaffe be ordered to repay $41,570 he had allegedly taken from the accounts of his corporation. He was found in contempt of court, and after his failure to attend a sentencing hearing two weeks later, Florida Seventh Circuit Judge E. L. Eastmoore sentenced him in absentia to 180 days in prison.

== Canadian government actions ==
=== Investigation of legal questions on Jaffe's abduction ===
In 1983, Canada's Department of External Affairs began looking into a number of legal questions concerning Jaffe's abduction, including whether the U.S. was responsible under international law for the kidnapping, whether the U.S. had violated its extradition treaty with Canada or other legal obligations it owed to Canada, whether Canada could demand the return of Jaffe or reparation for any U.S. violation of legal obligations, and whether Canada could take its case to the International Court of Justice. Charles B. Bourne wrote a legal opinion for the department addressing these questions. He stated that the U.S. had breached international law by not taking measures to prevent Jaffe's kidnapping or violations of his human rights by its citizens. While he stated that Jaffe's abduction was a private rather than a state act, he found that a Canadian protest and demand for his return would place an obligation on the United States to repatriate him in either case. Finally, he stated that Florida's actions against Jaffe violated international law.

=== Motion to dismiss charges against Jaffe ===
In August 1983, the Canadian government filed its own motion in the United States District Court for the Middle District of Florida in Jacksonville, separately from motions by Jaffe's own lawyers, demanding that Jaffe be returned to Canada. The Canadian government argued that Jaffe's abduction violated the U.S.' extradition treaty with Canada. Florida Assistant Attorney General Richard Martell countered that the question of Jaffe's release on the grounds of violation of the extradition treaty would be "a political matter" for the executive branch and not the courts to decide.

U.S. officials including Secretary of State George P. Shultz and Attorney General William French Smith petitioned Florida to release Jaffe. Shultz stated in a letter to the Florida Probation and Parole Committee, "As no good reason appears why the extradition treaty was not utilized to secure Mr. Jaffe's return, it is perfectly understandable that the Government of Canada is outraged by his alleged kidnapping, which Canada considers a violation of the treaty and of international law." However, Martell responded that he was concerned about reimbursement of the land buyers who lost money in the deal. NBC News interviewed victims of Jaffe's alleged fraud, one of whom also expressed anger at Shultz' involvement, stating, "This man has swindled a lot of people out of a lot of money, and Washington is sitting up there. They don't feel it; they don't care." The Montreal Gazette speculated in an editorial that Shultz's intervention was related to Canada's decision to permit U.S. cruise missile testing on its soil.

Charles Cole of Canada's Department of External Affairs emphasised in media comments that his government's motion had nothing to do with its opinion of whether Jaffe was innocent or guilty, but rather was based on the fundamental principle of international law that foreign agents could not simply enter another sovereign country and seize a person as they pleased. Canadian diplomats stated that the bounty hunters who seized Jaffe were not merely private actors but had received assistance from Florida state officials. Professor Gerald Morris of the University of Toronto, vice president of the International Law Association, in an interview with the Vancouver Sun described Jaffe's actions as equivalent to "a contractor not obtaining the proper permits"; Boyles disagreed, calling Jaffe a "big-time white-collar criminal".

=== Extradition of bounty hunters ===
Bounty hunters Timm Johnsen and Daniel Kear attempted to argue at their extradition hearings that they should not be extradited because they were acting on behalf of the state of Florida, and presented evidence that the State Attorney's office was aware of their plan to seize Jaffe from Canada and had even provided Johnsen and Kear with Jaffe's address in Toronto. However, in April 1982, Judge Paul Dietrich ruled that Johnsen's extradition would be legal. Kear also attempted to argue that he could not be extradited due to the requirement of double criminality, claiming that his actions were not criminal under U.S. law on bounty hunters. However, it had previously been ruled in the Supreme Court case Reese v. United States that bounty hunters could not exercise their powers across international borders, and so Kear was found extraditable as well.

At a preliminary hearing for Johnsen and Kear in January 1984, defence lawyers questioned Jaffe about his residence in the years 1979 and 1980, before the fraud charges and also before his application for Canadian citizenship. Judge Lorenzo DiCecco, angered by Jaffe's evasiveness and contradictions in his testimony, warned Jaffe's lawyer that "You'd better advise your client what perjury means. There is just so much the court can put up with." In November 1984, Johnsen and Kear were ordered by the Ontario Provincial Court to stand trial on kidnapping charges. Judge DiCecco ruled that there was sufficient evidence for a trial, but that there might be mitigating circumstances due to the bail bond agreement signed by Jaffe in August 1980 in which he authorised the bond holder to apprehend him if he left Florida. In his ruling, DiCecco stated, "I'm satisfied [Jaffe] was taken against his will. The question is: Was the transportation lawful?" The trial would not be held until 1986 (see below).

== 1984 Florida perjury charges against Jaffe ==
In March 1984, investigator Glenn Norris of the State Attorney's Office filed new perjury charges against Jaffe, alleging that two statements of his made during investigations of his land deals were false: one in which he failed to mention that Atlantic Commercial Development Corporation had maintained an account with the First National Bank of Elko, Nevada, and another in which he failed to mention money paid by ACDC to his daughter Robin Jaffe when asked if the corporation had paid any money to his family members. In media comments, Jaffe stated, "[Boyles'] first spurious charges went down the tubes, and now it looks like there's a good chance his second spurious charges are going down the tubes".

In June 1984, Florida Special Prosecutor Larry Nixon disclosed that the state government was preparing an extradition request for Jaffe on those perjury charges. In October 1984, Jaffe was also sentenced to 180 days in jail for contempt of court, but this misdemeanor charge was not an extraditable offence. Florida State Governor Bob Graham reviewed the request personally due to the high level of international attention to Jaffe's case, and signed and submitted the paperwork to the Justice Department's Office for International Affairs in November 1984. By February 1985, the Canadian government had not yet responded to the extradition request; The Gainesville Sun speculated that their failure to respond was an expression of their anger over Jaffe's earlier kidnapping.

== Canada asks Jaffe not to appear for new trial ==
Jaffe's new trial on the fraud charges was scheduled for April 1985. A week before jury selection in the new trial was set to begin, Judge Howell W. Melton of the Middle District declined a motion by Jaffe's lawyers to block the trial on the grounds that it would subject Jaffe to double jeopardy. Separately, the Canadian government filed a motion to halt the trial because Jaffe was illegally abducted from Canada; lawyer Alex Kleibomar called it a "direct proximate insult to the national dignity of Canada". However, Judge John H. Moore of the Middle District denied a motion. Assistant Deputy Attorney General of Canada Douglas J. A. Rutherford described Moore's ruling as "unacceptable". Nevertheless, in the end Jaffe did not appear at that trial: the Canadian government had instead asked him in writing to remain in Canada in order to testify at the upcoming trial of the two bounty hunters accused of his 1981 kidnapping, and Jaffe chose to comply. Jaffe's lawyer Michael L. Von Zamft presented a letter to that effect from the Canadian government to Sanders on the day of the trial, and stated to Florida Seventh Circuit Judge Sanders, "He's a Canadian citizen following the dictates of his government". Nevertheless, Sanders ordered Jaffe's arrest as well as the forfeiture of Jaffe's US$150,000 bail bond to Putnam County.

== Aftermath ==
=== Civil actions by Jaffe ===
A separate civil case by Jaffe against Charles W. Grant, bankruptcy trustee for Continental Southeast Land Corporation, Circuit Judge E. L. Eastmoore, State Attorney Stephen Boyles, and the Florida Department of Business and Professional Regulation ended in October 1984 with dismissal of the suit against all respondents but Grant, and Jaffe being ordered to pay $3 million to Grant. Jaffe also filed suit in Canada against Sun Bank of Tallahassee seeking refund of the bail money. Justice Robert Sutherland dismissed an application by the bank to stop the lawsuit, but in December 1988, the Ontario Supreme Court ruled against Jaffe.

=== Trial of bounty hunters ===
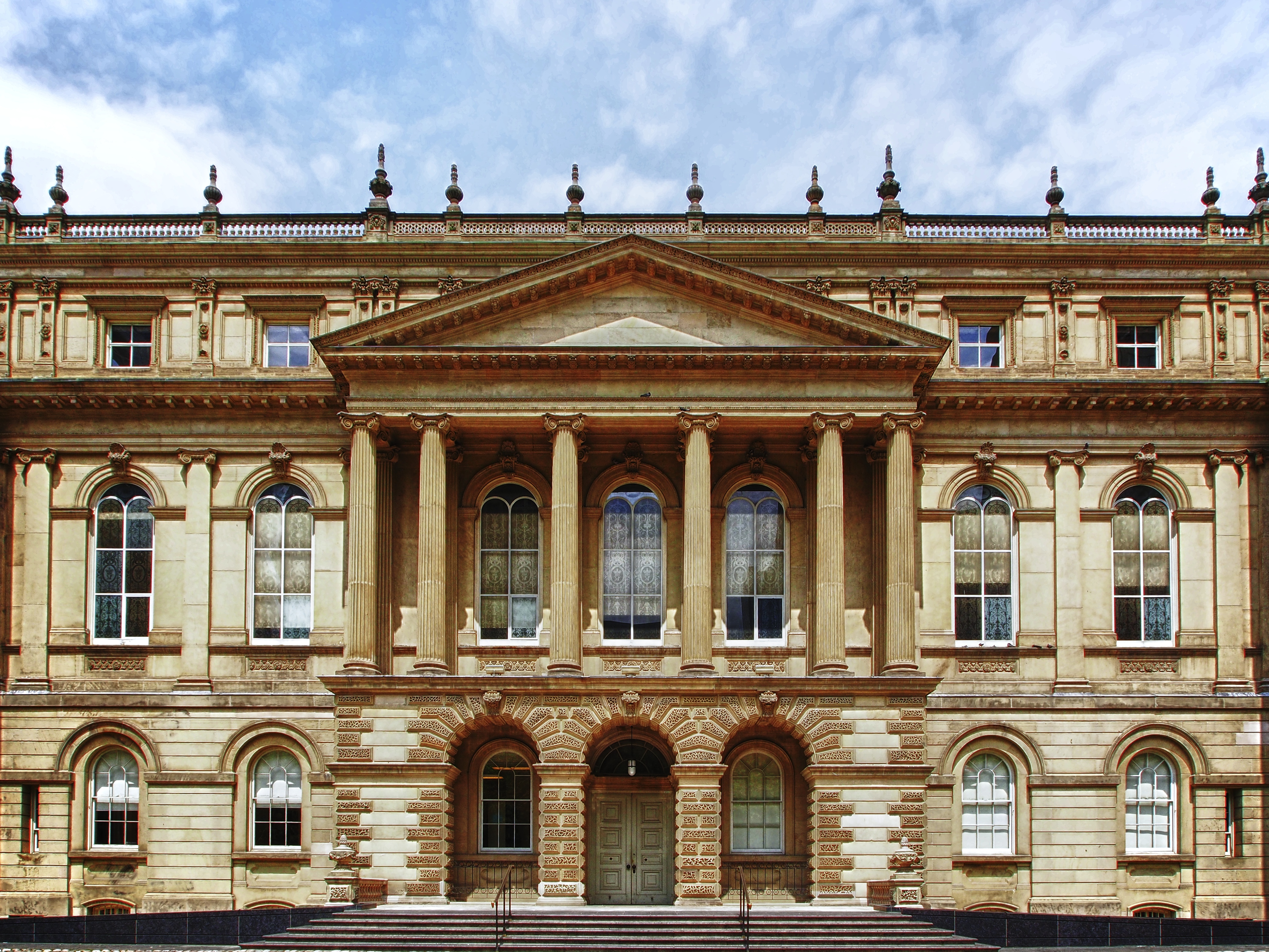
The Court of Appeal for Ontario upheld Johnsen and Kear's convictions, but reduced their sentences to time served.

The trial of bounty hunters Johnsen and Kear did not begin until May 1986. It was believed to be the first case in Canada where a private individual working under a foreign bail code was tried for kidnapping. At the end of that month, an Ontario jury found them guilty after nine hours of deliberations. Johnsen and Kear could have been sentenced to life imprisonment; they requested to be held in protective custody because they feared their prior involvement with law enforcement might lead to danger from fellow prisoners. In the end, the court sentenced them to 21 months' imprisonment, but they were released on bail pending appeal just a few weeks later. In 1989, the Court of Appeal for Ontario reduced their sentences to time served and released them. However, the court upheld their convictions, stating "the very conviction of those men of one of the most serious offenses known to Canadian law would go a long way towards the vindication of Canada's sovereignty and towards repudiation of their affront to it".

=== Canada–U.S. exchange of letters ===
After the Jaffe incident, Canada and the United States entered into discussions in order to come to an understanding which could prevent future cases of Canadians being forcibly removed from Canada to U.S. jurisdiction. The result was a January 1988 exchange of letters preceding the signing of the first protocol to the two countries' 1971 extradition treaty. U.S. Secretary of State George Shultz's letter to Canada's Secretary of State for External Affairs Joe Clark recognized that "transborder abduction of persons found in Canada to the United States of America by civilian agents of bail bonding companies, so-called 'bounty hunters', is an extraditable offense", and agreed "to consult promptly concerning any case of transborder abduction involving bounty hunters which might arise in the future ... to address matters relating to any such case, including any request by the Government of Canada for the return of the person so abducted". Clark replied to indicate his acceptance.

This understanding was first tested in November 2004, after Canadian citizen Kenneth Weckwerth was abducted from Golden Lake, Ontario by American bail bondsmen Reginald Bailey and Robert Carden Roberts. The two handcuffed him and headed for the United States. After crossing into the U.S. via the Rainbow Bridge, all three were arrested in Niagara Falls, New York, the two bounty hunters on charges of illegally smuggling an alien into the United States, and Weckwerth on the drug trafficking charges outstanding against him in Ohio for which the bounty hunters had kidnapped him. Marty Littlefield, Assistant U.S. Attorney for the Western District of New York, initially stated that Weckwerth's allegedly voluntary entrance into the U.S. without resisting his captors meant he was "not entitled to return to Canada". The U.S. Department of Justice later issued a statement that the two countries were "presently in conversation as to the exact status of Mr. Weckwerth in the United States". Canadian officials called for Weckwerth to be returned to Canada, while the Ontario Provincial Police laid kidnapping charges against Bailey and Roberts, obtained a warrant for their arrest, and entered discussions with the Attorney General's office on extradition proceedings. Bailey was sentenced to a year in U.S. federal prison, while Roberts served five months of a six-month sentence; Roberts was later quoted as stating, "I am so sorry I ever did anything. I was just trying to do my job. I thought if I could just convince the guy to come back, it would be okay."

=== Death ===
Jaffe died on 16 July 2005, at the age of 80.

== See also ==
- List of solved missing person cases
