= Director of Public Prosecutions, Johannesburg and Another v Schultz and Others; Director of Public Prosecutions, Bloemfontein v Cholota =

DPP v Schultz; DPP v Cholota
- Court: Constitutional Court of South Africa
- Full case name: Director of Public Prosecutions, Johannesburg and Another v Schultz and Others; Director of Public Prosecutions, Bloemfontein v Cholota
- Decided: 26 January 2026
- Citation: [2026] ZACC 3

Case history
- Prior actions: Schultz v Minister of Justice and Correctional Services and Others [2022] ZAGPPHC 1001, Gauteng Division; Schultz v Minister of Justice and Correctional Services and Others [2024] ZASCA 77, Supreme Court of Appeal; S v Mokhesi and 17 Others [2025] ZAFSHC 164, Free State Division

Court membership
- Judges sitting: Mlambo DCJ, Kollapen J, Majiedt J, Mathopo J, Mhlantla J, Musi AJ, Nicholls AJ, Rogers J, Savage AJ, Theron J, Tshiqi J

Case opinions
- Only the national executive has authority to make outgoing extradition requests to foreign states.; An irregularity in extradition does not automatically divest the courts of jurisdiction; the principle in S v Ebrahim only applies in circumstances which bring the administration of justice into disrepute.
- Decision by: Theron J

Keywords
- extradition; external sovereignty; male captus bene detentus

Director of Public Prosecutions, Johannesburg and Another v Schultz and Others; Director of Public Prosecutions, Bloemfontein v Cholota [2026] ZACC 3 is a judgment of the Constitutional Court of South Africa dealing with the power to issue extradition requests and the consequences of an unlawful extradition on the jurisdiction of the South African courts. The court found that the national executive, and not the National Prosecuting Authority (NPA), has the power to make extradition requests to foreign countries. Extradition on the basis of a request issued by the NPA was therefore unlawful.

However, the court also found than an irregularity in extradition proceedings does not necessarily mean that South African courts have no jurisdiction; the principle laid down in S v Ebrahim only applies when the circumstances of the irregularity would bring the administration of justice into disrepute. In a case of an extradition that was invalid only because the request had been made by the NPA, the defendant was still subject to trial in South Africa.

== Background ==
=== Schultz case ===
In November 2021 a warrant was issued for the arrest of several people alleged to be involved in the theft and unlawful possession of unwrought precious metals. One of the accused was Johnathan Schultz, a South African citizen resident in the United States. When the other accused appeared for trial in May 2022, the prosecutor requested a postponement so that Schultz could be extradited.

Schultz applied to the Gauteng Division of the High Court for an order declaring that only the Minister of Justice has the power to issue a request for extradition. The High Court dismissed his application, finding that the NPA was the relevant authority to make extradition requests.

Schultz appealed to the Supreme Court of Appeal (SCA). The SCA panel (consisting of judges Mothle, Hughes and Mabindla-Boqwana, and acting judges Keightley and Seegobin) upheld the appeal and ruled that only the Minister of Justice has the power to issue extradition requests. The court held that extradition is a matter involving foreign relation and therefore falls within the domain of the executive, not the prosecuting authority.

=== Cholota case ===
In 2024 Moroadi Cholota, the personal assistant of former Premier of the Free State Ace Magashule, was extradited from the United States on charges of fraud and corruption related to the awarding of an R225-million asbestos mitigation contract by the Free State government. She raised a special plea arguing that the extradition was unlawful, based on allegations that the NPA supplied false information to US authorities.

However, in closing arguments before the Free State Division of the High Court, Cholota's lawyers raised the issue that the extradition request had not been made by the Minister of Justice as required by the judgment of the SCA in the Schultz case. The court accepted this argument and found that since the extradition was unlawful, in terms of the prececent set by S v Ebrahim the court had no jurisdiction to try Cholota.

== In the Constitutional Court ==
In the Schultz case, the Director of Public Prosecutions for Gauteng and the National Director of Public Prosecutions applied to the Constitutional Court for leave to appeal the SCA's decision. The application was, however, delivered three months late, so they also applied for condonation for the delay. They later reduced the scope of the appeal, requesting only an order to limit the retroactive effect of the Schultz decision on extraditions already underway. In the Cholota case, the Director of Public Prosecutions for the Free State applied to the Constitutional Court for leave to appeal the High Court's decision directly, bypassing the usual appeal to the SCA.
