= S v Ebrahim =

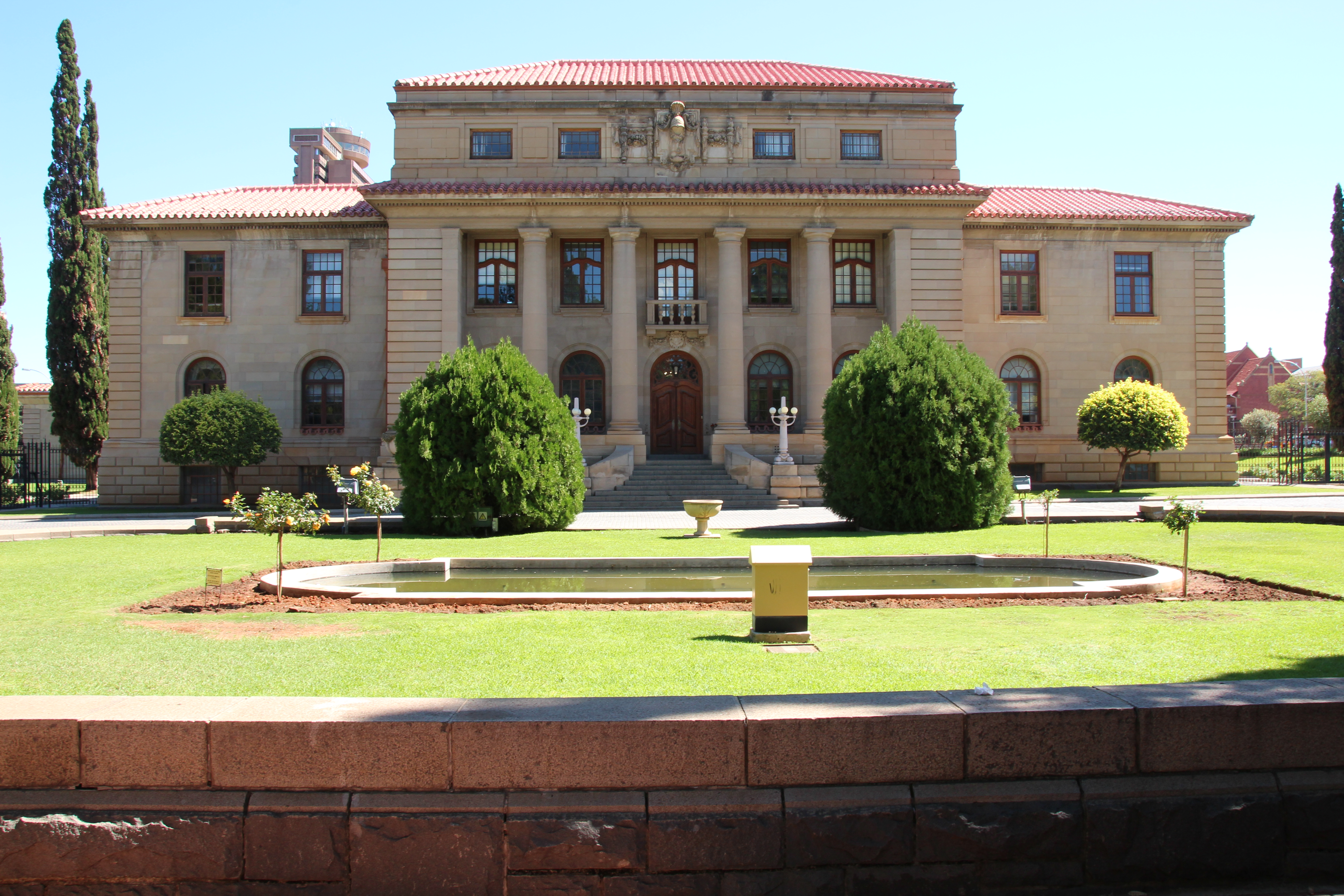
- Court: Appellate Division (South Africa)
- Full case name: The State v Ebrahim Ismail Ebrahim
- Decided: 26 February 1991
- Citations: [1991] ZASCA 3; 1991 (2) SA 553 (AD); [1991] 4 All SA 356 (AD); 31 I.L.M. 888 (1992)

Case history
- Appealed from: Transvaal Provincial Division (East and South-East Circuit Local Division)

Court membership
- Judges sitting: Joubert ACJ, Van Heerden, Steyn, Grosskopf JJA, Nicholas AJA

Case opinions
- South African courts have no jurisdiction to try a defendant who was abducted from another country by agents of the state.
- Decision by: Steyn JA

Keywords
- extraterritorial abduction; extradition

The State v Ebrahim Ismail Ebrahim [1991] ZASCA 3; 1991 (2) SA 553 (AD); [1991] 4 All SA 356 (AD); 31 I.L.M. 888 (1992) is a judgment of the Appellate Division of the Supreme Court of South Africa which found that the South African courts have no jurisdiction to try a defendant who had been abducted from a foreign country by agents of the South African government. The conviction of Ebrahim Ebrahim for high treason was set aside.

== Case ==
Two men identifying themselves as South African police officers seized Ebrahim Ebrahim, a South African member of the military wing of the anti-apartheid African National Congress, in Swaziland in December 1986. Ebrahim was bound, gagged, blindfolded, and brought to Pretoria and charged with treason. Swaziland did not protest this abduction. Ebrahim argued that his abduction and rendition violated international law, and that the trial court was thus incompetent to try him because international law was a part of South African law.

Invoking Roman-Dutch common law, the Court concluded that it lacked jurisdiction to try a person brought before it from another state by means of state-sponsored abduction. These common law rules embody fundamental legal principles, including "the preservation and promotion of human rights, friendly international relations, and the sound administration of justice." The Court continued:

The individual must be protected from unlawful arrest and abduction, jurisdictional boundaries must not be exceeded, international legal sovereignty must be respected, the legal process must be fair towards those affected by it, and the misuse thereof must be avoided in order to protect and promote the dignity and integrity of the judicial system. This applies equally to the State. When the State is itself party to a dispute, as for example in criminal cases, it must come to court "with clean hands" as it were. When the State is itself involved in an abduction across international borders as in the instant case, its hands cannot be said to be clean.

The Court also noted that "the abduction was a violation of the applicable rules of international law, that these rules are part of [South African] law, and that this violation of these rules deprived the trial court competence to hear the matter."

== Aftermath ==
In a subsequent civil proceeding, Ebrahim was awarded compensation for the kidnapping.

The Appellate Division's judgment has been referred to in a number of foreign judgments, including the dissent of Justice Stevens in United States v. Alvarez-Machain and the judgment of the House of Lords in R v Horseferry Road Magistrates Court, ex p. Bennett.

The Constitutional Court considered the principle laid down in Ebrahim in the 2026 case of DPP v Schultz. The court held that the jurisdiction of the South African courts was not excluded in every case of an irregularity in extradition, but rather only in circumstances which "would bring the administration of justice into disrepute."
