= False arrest =

Unlawful arrest of an individual

False arrest, unlawful arrest, illegal arrest or wrongful arrest is a common law tort, where a plaintiff alleges they were held in custody without probable cause, or without an order issued by a court of competent jurisdiction. Although it is possible to sue law enforcement officials for false arrest, the usual defendants in such cases are private security firms.

== United Kingdom ==
In the United Kingdom, a police officer may arrest a person if they are executing a warrant, if they have a "reasonable belief" that someone is involved in a criminal offence, or if they have a reasonable belief that someone is about to be involved in a criminal offence and it is necessary to arrest that person. Proof of wrongful arrest depends on proving that an officer did not have a reasonable belief and that it was not necessary to arrest someone.

Most cases where unlawful arrest was determined emerge from a claim that an arrest was unnecessary.

The specific legislation governing, in England and Wales, the reasons for which a police officer may arrest a person are in section 24 of the Police and Criminal Evidence Act 1984.

Damages for unlawful arrest depend primarily on the time in custody and can be aggravated if the police acted maliciously.

== United States ==
After an arrest, if the charges are dropped, a person will sometimes file legal action or a complaint against the appropriate arresting agency. In most jurisdictions, the arrest powers of police and police agents are in excess of those afforded to ordinary citizens (see citizen's arrest). However, the powers of police officers to arrest are not unlimited. Generally speaking:

1. Anyone may arrest a person if in possession of an arrest warrant issued by an appropriate court. In the United States, this includes bounty hunters (agents of bail bondsmen) acting under the authority of a bench warrant to bring a criminal defendant who has skipped bail to court for trial.
2. A police officer, or a person authorized by a jurisdiction's police powers act, may arrest anyone whom the officer has probable cause to believe has committed any criminal offence. However, in the case of a misdemeanour, summary conviction offence, or non-criminal offence (such as a municipal by-law offence) the officer may arrest the suspect only long enough to identify the suspect and give the suspect a summons to appear in court, unless there is reason to believe they will not appear in answer to the summons.
3. Any person may arrest someone suspected of committing a felony or indictable offence, as long as the arresting person believes the suspect is attempting to flee the scene of the felony. A person cannot be arrested on suspicion of committing a felony well after the fact unless the arresting officer possesses an arrest warrant.

=== Citizens and businesses ===
Most cases of false arrest involve accusations of shoplifting, and are brought against security guards and retail stores. A guard cannot arrest someone merely on the suspicion that person is going to commit a theft. In most jurisdictions, there must be some proof that a criminal act has actually been committed. For example, a guard does not have reasonable and probable cause if a shopper has not yet paid for merchandise they are carrying in the belief that the person intends to leave without making payment. Instead, there must be an actual act committed – the person must make an actual attempt to leave the store without paying for the merchandise.

=== Police officers ===
In the United States and other jurisdictions, police officers and other government officials are liable for clear deprivation of rights, but are partially shielded from false arrest lawsuits through the doctrine of qualified immunity, when such a violation qualifies as "not obvious," by a US Supreme Court test. This doctrine can protect officials from liability when engaged in legal grey areas including qualifying discretionary actions in the arrests of suspects. However, the officer's actions must still not violate "clearly established law," or this protection is void. This includes executing an arrest warrant against the wrong person. False statements by public servants to justify or cover up an illegal arrest are another violation of federal law.

An example of this doctrine being tested is Sorrell v. McGuigan (4th Cir. 2002). A police officer (McGuigan) detained a man shopping at a mall (Sorrell) based on the description of a suspect who had committed a theft at a store nearby, and proceeded to search him for weapons. The store owner who reported the theft arrived at the scene and stated Sorrell and his friends were not the ones who had stolen from him. However, the officer still arrested Sorrell for possession of a concealed weapon, because he was carrying a folding knife with a 3 inch long blade in his pocket. In Maryland, non-automatic folding knives are not considered weapons under state law regardless of their length, and the lack of length limit had been upheld multiple times in the state's highest court. However, the officer erroneously believed the knife to be a weapon. Sorrell was released immediately after booking and was never prosecuted as there was technically no crime, and sued the police officer for false arrest. The officer's qualified immunity was denied by the court, and this decision was upheld in the US Court of Appeals.

=== Bounty hunters ===
Bounty hunters have been subject to suits for false arrest after attempting to execute bench warrants outside of the United States, where they have no extra powers beyond those of ordinary citizens and only police officers may execute warrants. In at least two prominent cases, bounty hunters were charged with kidnapping after taking custody of a bail jumper outside of the United States and bringing them back to the court that issued the warrant. One of them, Daniel Kear, was extradited from the US and convicted.

There have been some cases where police officers or bounty hunters have executed valid arrest warrants against the wrong person. Although many false arrest suits result in only nominal damages, such mistakes usually result in large awards against the arresting officers.

=== Resisting unlawful arrest ===
Individuals who realize that they are the target of false arrest might attempt to resist or flee. Fourteen U.S. states as of 2012 recognize the target's right of self-defense so as to resist unlawful arrest. Typically, this only applies when:

- the arresting officer used more force than necessary to effect the arrest, and
- the resistance is only to such an extent as necessary to protect oneself from great bodily harm or death.

In such jurisdictions – and under the narrowly defined circumstances described above – resisting unlawful arrest may be used as a justification for such resistance where it would otherwise be a crime (i.e. resisting arrest, flight to avoid prosecution, assault, etc.). There are rare cases in which a murder charge had been reduced to manslaughter for this reason.

Justification for such action is often hard to prove in court, and only justified in certain circumstances. Simple mistake of fact situations would generally not warrant attempting to elude law enforcement. However, there are some that would, such as:

- the person making the arrest never identifying themselves, causing the defendant to believe they are the target of kidnapping or robbery.
- the reasonable belief that the person making the arrest is an impersonator with the intent of victimizing the defendant.

== Other countries ==
Former Iraqi president and dictator Saddam Hussein subjected people to arbitrary arrest, including people in Kuwait during the First Gulf War. Saudi Arabia and Iran also do similar things.

== See also ==
- Arrest quota
- Arbitrary arrest and detention
- False imprisonment
