= Frisbie v. Collins =

1952 U.S. Supreme Court case on the legality of State abductions of criminal suspects

- Supreme Court of the United States

Argued January 28, 1952 Decided March 10, 1952
- Full case name: Frisbie, Warden v. Shirley Collins
- Citations: 342 U.S. 519 (more) 72 S. Ct. 509; 96 L. Ed. 2d 541; 1952 U.S. LEXIS 2343

Case history
- Prior: Collins v. Frisbie, 189 F.2d 464 (6th Cir. 1951); cert. granted, 342 U.S. 865 (1951).
- Subsequent: Rehearing denied, 343 U.S. 937 (1952).

Holding
- There is nothing in the Constitution that requires a court to permit a guilty person rightfully convicted to escape justice because he was brought to trial against his will.

Court membership
- Chief Justice Fred M. Vinson Associate Justices Hugo Black · Stanley F. Reed; Felix Frankfurter · William O. Douglas; Robert H. Jackson · Harold H. Burton; Tom C. Clark · Sherman Minton

Case opinion
- Majority: Black, joined by unanimous

Laws applied
- Federal Kidnapping Act, 18 U.S.C. § 1201

Frisbie v. Collins, 342 U.S. 519 (1952), is a decision by the United States Supreme Court, holding that kidnapping of a defendant by State authorities for the purpose of taking a suspect from one jurisdiction to another for criminal trial, is constitutional. The defendant was tried in Michigan after being abducted by Michigan authorities in Chicago, Illinois. The case relied upon Ker v. Illinois (1886). The Ker–Frisbie doctrine, continues to be used to uphold convictions based on illegal arrests.

== Background ==
=== Ker v. Illinois ===
Ker v. Illinois, decided in 1886, was the first case to consider whether authorities are allowed to abduct criminal suspects in other countries in order to face trial in the United States. Frederick M. Ker, a U.S. citizen living in Peru, sought to avoid the charges of larceny and embezzlement. US president, President Chester Arthur, sent an agent to negotiate extradition with Peruvian authorities to bring Ker back to the US. Instead, the agent forcibly abducted Ker before the extradition was processed. Although Peru did not raise claims under its extradition treaty, Ker argued that the US had committed extraterritorial abduction. The Supreme Court ruled, "such forcible abduction is no sufficient reason why the party should not answer when brought within the jurisdiction of the court which has the right to try him for such an offense and presents no valid objection to his trial in such court”.

=== Facts of the Case ===
Shirley Collins filed a Habeas corpus case in a United States District Court seeking release from a Michigan state prison where he was serving a life sentence for murder. He was forcibly taken to Michigan to stand trial. Collins sought to nullify his conviction under these circumstances, claiming that trial and conviction under such circumstances is in violation of the Fourteenth Amendment to the United States Constitution and the Federal Kidnapping Act.

=== Lower Court Decisions ===
The District Court denied the writ of Habeas corpus without a hearing on the ground that the state court has power to try a defendant, "regardless of how presence was procured." The Court of Appeals reversed and remanded the decision of the lower court, with one judge dissenting. It held that the Federal Kidnapping Act had changed the rule that a state could constitutionally try and convict a defendant who had been forcibly brought to its jurisdiction.

=== Federal Kidnapping Act ===
The Federal Kidnapping Act, was enacted in 1932 and made it a felony to transport any person across state lines. Persons who have violated it can be imprisoned for a term of years or for life; under some circumstances violators can be given the death sentence. The Court of Appeals thought that to continue to allow forcible removal across state lines after the passage of the Kidnaping Act "would in practical effect lend encouragement to the commission of criminal acts by those sworn to enforce the law."

== Opinion of the Court ==
Justice Hugo Black delivered the opinion of the court, reaffirming the Ker v. Illinois ruling that forcible abduction into a jurisdiction does not impair the power of a court to try a person for a crime. In rejecting the Appeals Court holding, the Supreme Court found that the severity of the sanctions under the Kidnapping Act made it unlikely that Congress had intended for them to apply to law enforcement officers and a state's ability to try a person wrongfully brought to its jurisdiction.

== Relevance today ==
Frisbie v. Collins has been cited 13 times by the US Supreme Court, often regarding federal/state jurisdictional issues. On substantive grounds, it has been consistently used in support of a general proposition that an illegal arrest does not void a subsequent conviction.

Notably, Frisbie was relied upon in the 1980 case United States v. Crews, 445 U.S. 463 (1980), in both the opinion written by William J. Brennan Jr. and the two concurring opinions upholding the decision of the lower court. In this case, the defendant had been illegally arrested and a photograph was taken. The victim of an assault was shown the photo and subsequently identified the defendant in both a lineup and in court. The trial court determined that the initial arrest was illegal and therefore excluded the photo and lineup identification from a subsequent trial. However, it also concluded that the courtroom identification was the product of independent recollection. The concurring opinion by Justice Byron White, with whom Chief Justice Warren E. Burger and Justice William Rehnquist joined, directly addressed the question of whether a face could ever be excluded as the fruit of an illegal arrest. This issue had been left open in the main opinion. White's position was that "The fact that respondent was present at trial and therefore capable of being identified by the victim is merely the inevitable result of the trial being held, which is permissible under Frisbie, despite respondent's unlawful arrest."

Frisbie was most recently cited in 1992 in deciding United States v. Alvarez-Machain. That case involved the abduction of a Mexican citizen by US officials and a violation of the territorial integrity of Mexico country. The court acknowledged the validity of the Ker-Frisbie doctrine and considered whether it would apply when the illegal abduction was done in the context of violating the clear terms of an extradition treaty. The court held that a defendant has no rights under international law or an extradition treaty. Justice Stevens wrote the minority opinion, joined by justices Harry Blackmun and Sandra Day O'Connor, writing: “It is clear that Mexico's demand must be honored if this official abduction violated the 1978 Extradition Treaty between the United States and Mexico.”

== See also ==
- List of United States Supreme Court cases, volume 342
- Ker v. Illinois, 119 U.S. 436 (1886)
- United States v. Alvarez-Machain, 504 U.S. 655 (1992)
