= Presbyterian Church of Sudan v. Talisman Energy, Inc =

American legal case

Presbyterian Church of Sudan v. Talisman Energy
- Court: United States Court of Appeals for the Second Circuit
- Full case name: The Presbyterian Church of Sudan, Rev. Matthew Mathiang Deang, Rev. James Koung Ninrew, Nuer Community Development Services in U.S.A., Fatuma Nyawang Garbang, Nyot Tot Rieth, individually and on behalf of the estate of her husband Joseph Thiet Makuac, Stephen Hoth, Stephen Kuina, Chief Tunguar Kueigwong Rat, Luka Ayuol Yol, Thomas Malual Kap, Puok Bol Mut, Chief Patai Tut, Chief Peter Ring Patai, Chief Gatluak Chiek Jang, Yien Nyinar Riek, and Moris Bol Majok, on behalf of themselves and all others similarly situated v. Talisman Energy, Inc., The Republic of the Sudan
- Argued: January 12, 2009
- Decided: October 2, 2009
- Citation: 582 F. 3d 244 (2d Cir. 2009)

Case history
- Prior history: 244 F. Supp. 2d 289 (S.D.N.Y. March 19, 2003)

Holding
- To establish aiding-and-abetting liability under the Alien Tort Statute, a plaintiff must prove the defendant acted with the purpose of facilitating violations of international law, rather than merely knowing assistance would contribute to those violations.

Court membership
- Judges sitting: Cabranes, Jacobs, Leval

Case opinions
- Majority: Cabranes, joined by Jacobs and Leval

Laws applied
- Alien Tort Statute

Presbyterian Church of Sudan v. Talisman Energy, Inc., 582 F.3d 244 (2d Cir. 2009), was a case in which the United States Court of Appeals for the Second Circuit held that under customary international law, "the mens rea standard for aiding and abetting liability in Alien Tort Statute actions is purpose rather than knowledge alone." The cased was based on allegations that a Canadian oil company had aided and abetted in the commission of human rights abuses in Sudan.

== Legal background ==
The Alien Tort Statute (ATS) grants United States federal district courts "jurisdiction of any civil action by an alien for a tort only, committed in violation of the law of nations or a treaty of the United States." Although the exact intent and scope of the law have been the subject of debate, U.S. courts have held that it "authorizes aliens to bring claims in U.S. courts for violations of modern international law, including human rights abuses."

== Factual and procedural background ==
During the Second Sudanese Civil War, Talisman Energy Inc., a Canadian independent petroleum company, purchased Arakis Energy. The purchase gave Talisman a 25% interest (held by Arakis) in the Greater Nile Oil project operated by the Greater Nile Petroleum Operating Company (GNPOC). The Sudanese government, heavily dependent on oil revenues, was accused of committing human rights abuses during the war and oil companies were accused of complicity in those actions.

A group of Sudanese citizens filed a lawsuit against Talisman in November 2001, asking for monetary damages, as well as an injunction "restraining defendants from continuing to cooperate in committing 'ethnic cleansing' against non-Muslim, African Sudanese." According to the plaintiffs, "Talisman would have regular meetings with Sudan's army intelligence unit and the Ministry of Energy and Mining during which the parties would discuss 'how to dispose of civilians' in areas in which Talisman intended to operate." In addition to allegations of direct support, the plaintiffs also alleged that Talisman indirectly supported the government's human rights abuses because (among other things) Talisman built roads that "were used by Government forces to launch military offensives against civilian targets." The plaintiffs argued that the ATS granted the courts jurisdiction over their claims.

After various amendments to the complaint and motions to dismiss, Talisman's motion for summary judgment was granted in September 2006. The plaintiffs appealed the judgment to the Second Circuit.

== Decision ==
The Court of appeals held that "that under international law, a claimant must show that the defendant provided substantial assistance with the purpose of facilitating the alleged offenses." Applying the decision of the Supreme Court of the United States in Sosa v. Alvarez-Machain, the court reasoned:

Claims "based on the present-day law of nations" should be recognized only if "accepted by the civilized world and defined with a specificity comparable to the features of the 18th-century paradigms" contemporary with enactment of the ATS.

The court held that no "consensus exists [in international law] for imposing liability on individuals who knowingly (but not purposefully) aid and abet a violation of international law." The summary judgment in favor of Talisman was affirmed.

== See also ==
- Federal Tort Claims Act
- Jus cogens
