= Murder of Ilyas Safiullin =

2024 murder in Moscow, Russia

Ilyas Safovich Safiullin (Russian: Ильяс Сафович Сафиуллин; 10 November 1968 – 2 April 2025), baptized Ilya (Russian: Илья), was a Russian Orthodox altar server and handyman murdered in the Church of the Almighty Savior, in Moscow. Although he has not been canonized, Orthodox commentators have regarded him as martyr.

== Background ==
Safiullin was born into a Tatar Muslim family in Nizhny Novgorod. In 2017 he converted to Eastern Orthodoxy and was baptized with the similar Christian name Ilya. His conversion was part of a broader trend noted in Russia, where a growing number of Tatars have been embracing Christianity. He supervised an Alcoholics Anonymous group in church and was involved in charity, painting, music, theater and folk dances. He was a member of the Union of Orthodox Tatars and the Moscow Tatar Orthodox Christian Community.

== Murder ==
On April 2, 2025, Safiullin was attacked and killed in the Church of the Merciful Savior in Moscow. He suffered extensive injuries: his head was struck with a fire extinguisher, his hands were tied, his throat was slit, and his body was stabbed multiple times. The attacker also ran around the church looking for a priest, presumably Father Andrey Yakubov, also a Tatar.

=== Suspect ===
The suspected attacker was identified as a 36-year-old man from Uzbekistan named Khusan Khusanov, who was arrested at the scene. Investigators determined that the killing was premeditated. Reports suggest that the attacker had no personal connection to the victim and may have been mentally unstable or religiously radicalized, although there has been no official confirmation of terrorist affiliation. Khusanov had no criminal records.
