= Bounty hunter =

Person who catches criminals or fugitives for a monetary reward

Occupation
- Activity sectors: United States

Description
- Fields of employment: Parapolice (quasi-law enforcement)
- Related jobs: Bail bondsman, thief-taker, privateer, vigilante, marshal, mercenary, citizen's arrest, neighborhood watch

A bounty hunter in the United States is a private agent working for a bail bondsman who captures fugitives or criminals for a commission or bounty. The occupation, officially known as a bail enforcement agent or fugitive recovery agent, has traditionally operated outside the legal constraints that govern police officers and other agents of the state. This is because a bail agreement between a defendant and a bail bondsman is essentially a civil contract that it is incumbent upon the bondsman to enforce. Since they are not police officers, bounty hunters are exposed to legal liabilities from which agents of the state are protected as these immunities enable police to perform their functions effectively without fear of lawsuits. Bounty hunters are typically independent contractors paid a commission of the total bail amount that is owed by the fugitive and co-signer; they provide their own professional liability insurance and only get paid if they are able to find the "skip" and bring them in.

Bounty hunting is a vestige of common law, which was created during the Middle Ages. In the United States, bounty hunters primarily draw their legal imprimatur from an 1872 Supreme Court decision, Taylor v. Taintor. The practice historically existed in many parts of the world; however, as of the 21st century, it is found almost exclusively in the United States as it is illegal under the laws of most other countries. State laws vary widely as to the legality of the practice; Illinois, Kentucky, Oregon, and Wisconsin have outlawed commercial bail bonds, while most states have few or no training requirements for bail agents or bounty hunters, and only 22 states require that bounty hunters be licensed.

== History ==
=== The Old West ===
In 1873, the Supreme Court noted that bounty hunters were a part of the U.S. law enforcement system with a decision in Taylor v. Taintor:

When the bail is given, the principal is regarded as delivered to the custody of his sureties. Their domain is a continuance of the original imprisonment. Whenever they choose to do so, they may seize him and deliver him up to his discharge; and if it cannot be done at once, they may imprison him until it can be done. They may exercise their rights in person or by agent. They may pursue him into another state; may arrest him on the Sabbath; and if necessary, may break and enter his house for that purpose. The seizure is not made by virtue of due process. None is needed. It is likened to the arrest by the sheriff of an escaped prisoner.

Bounty hunters at the time were used to catch wanted criminals and children who ran away from the American Indian boarding schools.

== Modern times ==
In modern times, bounty hunters carry out arrests mostly of those who have skipped bail or whose bail has been revoked; but are often referred to as and typically prefer to be identified by more formal titles such as "bail enforcement agents" or "fugitive recovery agents".

When undertaking arrest warrants, agents may wear bullet-resistant vests, badges, and other clothing bearing the inscription "bail enforcement agent" or similar titles. Many agents arm themselves with firearms, or sometimes with less lethal weapons, such as tasers, batons, tear gas (CS gas, pepper spray), or pepper spray projectiles.

The National Association of Fugitive Recovery Agents is the professional association representing this industry.

== Domestic practice ==
Bounty hunters in the United States are employed by bail bondsmen. The bounty hunter is usually paid about 10% of the total bail amount, but this commission can vary on an individual, case-by-case basis, usually depending upon the difficulty level of the assignment and the approach used to exonerate the bail bond. If the fugitive eludes bail, the bondsman, not the bounty hunter, is responsible for 100% of the total bail amount. This is a way of ensuring clients arrive at trial. As of 2003, bounty hunters claimed to catch 31,500 bail jumpers per year, about 90% of people who jump bail.

Bounty hunters have varying levels of authority in their duties with regard to their targets, depending on which states they operate in. Barring restrictions applicable state by state, a bounty hunter may enter the fugitive's legal residence without any warrant, besides the original bail bonds contract signed by the fugitive, to execute a re-arrest.

In some states, bounty hunters do not undergo any formal training, and are generally unlicensed, only requiring sanction from a bail bondsman to operate. In other states, however, they are held to varying standards of training and license. State legal requirements are often imposed on out-of-state bounty hunters, so a fugitive could temporarily escape rearrest by entering a state in which the bail agent has limited or no jurisdiction.

=== Laws and regulation ===
In the United States legal system, the 1873 U.S. Supreme Court case Taylor v. Taintor, 16 Wall (83 U.S. 366, 21 L.Ed. 287), is cited as having established that the person into whose custody an accused is remanded as part of the accuser's bail has sweeping rights to that person. Though this may have been accurate at the time the decision was reached, the portion cited was obiter dictum and has no binding precedential value.

As of 2008, four states, Illinois, Kentucky, Oregon, and Wisconsin, prohibit the practice, as they have abolished commercial bail bonds and banned the commercial bail bonds industry within their borders. As of 2012, Nebraska and Maine similarly prohibit surety bail bonds. The states of Texas and California require a license to engage in bounty hunting while other states may have no restrictions.

There have been some states that have rolled out specific laws that govern bounty hunting. For example, Minnesota laws provide that a bounty hunter cannot drive a white, black, maroon, or dark green vehicle, or wear any colors that are reserved for the police in the state (e.g. maroon, which is worn by the Minnesota State Patrol).

==== Connecticut ====
The State of Connecticut has a detailed licensing process which requires any person who wants to engage in the business as a bail enforcement agent, (BEA) (bounty hunter) to first obtain a professional license from the Commissioner of Public Safety; specifically detailing that "No person shall, as surety on a bond in a criminal proceeding or as an agent of such surety, engage in the business of taking or attempting to take into custody the principal on the bond who has failed to appear in court and for whom a re-arrest warrant or capias has been issued unless such person is licensed as a bail enforcement agent". Connecticut has strict standards which require bail enforcement agents (BEAs) to pass an extensive background check and, while engaging in fugitive recovery operations, wear a uniform, notify the local police barrack, wear a badge, and only carry licensed and approved firearms, including handguns and long guns which are permitted. Recently, the Connecticut State Police converted its bail enforcement agent licensing unit to reflect the role bail enforcement agents (BEAs) play in the Connecticut criminal justice system; placing them in the newly defined Department of Emergency Services and Public Protection.

Several schools in Connecticut have obtained certification by the Connecticut State Police to pre-license bail enforcement agents in a minimum of 20 hours of criminal justice training and a minimum of eight hours of firearms training. Some of the more advanced schools offer specialized training in the area of tactical firearms to prepare BEAs for conducting dangerous recovery operations.

==== Florida ====
In Florida, only a "limited surety agent" licensed by the Florida Department of Financial Services' Bureau of Agent and Agency Licensing may legally apprehend bail fugitives in addition to law enforcement's ability to arrest a fugitive pursuant to a bench warrant. According to the Chapter 648 of Florida Statute regarding Bail Bond Agents, "A person may not represent himself or herself to be a bail enforcement agent, bounty hunter, or other similar title in this state."

==== Louisiana ====
Louisiana requires bounty hunters to wear clothing identifying them as such.

==== Nevada ====
A Nevada bounty hunter is referred to as a bail enforcement agent (BEA) or bail enforcement solicitor. In order to meet state requirements, the bail agent must complete a minimum 80 hours of training (or a POST certification), and pass the required examinations and obtain a bail enforcement agent (BEA) license by the Nevada Division of Insurance within nine months of employment. To acquire such license, one must be at least 21 years old, a United States citizen, have a high school diploma or equivalent, and undergo the required training and pass a state examination.

==== Ohio ====
While Ohio continues to utilize bail enforcement agents, it is a misdemeanor crime for those in the profession to refer to themselves as a "bounty hunter" in that state.

==== Texas ====
A Texas bounty hunter is required to be a peace officer, Level III (armed) security officer, or a private investigator.

== International action by American bounty hunters ==
International extradition exists only by authority of an international treaty with the nation where the fugitive is located. Extradition treaties limit extradition to certain offenses and not all fugitives can be extradited. Generally, the crime being charged against the fugitive must be recognized as a crime in the jurisdiction from which extradition is being sought.

Bail fugitive recovery agents may run into serious legal problems if they try to apprehend fugitives outside the United States, where they have no legal authority to arrest, and taking a person into custody could be charged as kidnapping or some other serious crime. While the United States government and most states recognize a bail agent or fugitive recovery agent's powers of arrest, the governments in other countries, including sovereign Native American territories within the United States, do not recognize a bail agent's or fugitive recovery agent's powers of arrest.

Bounty hunter Duane "Dog" Chapman, star of the TV series Dog the Bounty Hunter, was arrested in Mexico after he apprehended the multi-millionaire rapist and fugitive Andrew Luster. Chapman was subsequently released, but was later declared a fugitive by a Mexican prosecutor and was subsequently arrested in the United States to be extradited back to Mexico. All charges were later dropped due to the crime passing the statute of limitations date. Chapman has maintained that under Mexico's citizen arrest law, he and his crew acted under proper policy.

=== Legal action against bounty hunters ===
Daniel Kear of Fairfax, Virginia, pursued and abducted Sidney Jaffe at a residence in Canada and returned him to Florida to face trial. Kear was extradited to Canada in 1983, and convicted of kidnapping.

Several bounty hunters have been arrested for killing a fugitive or apprehending the wrong individuals.

Unlike police officers, they have no legal protections against injuries to non-fugitives and few legal protections against injuries to their targets.

In a Texas case, bounty hunters Richard James and his partner DG Pearson were arrested in 2001 for felony charges during an arrest. The charges were levied by the fugitive and his family, but were later dismissed against the hunters after the fugitive's wife shot a deputy sheriff in another arrest attempt of the fugitive by the county sheriff's department. The hunters sued the fugitive and family, winning the civil suit for malicious prosecution with a judgment amount of $1.5 million.

== See also ==
- Citizen's arrest
- Citizen's arrest in the United States
- False arrest
- List of fictional assassins and bounty hunters
- Skiptrace
- United States Marshals Service fugitive programs
- Vigilantism in the United States of America
