= Home repair =

Maintenance and resolution of problems in a house

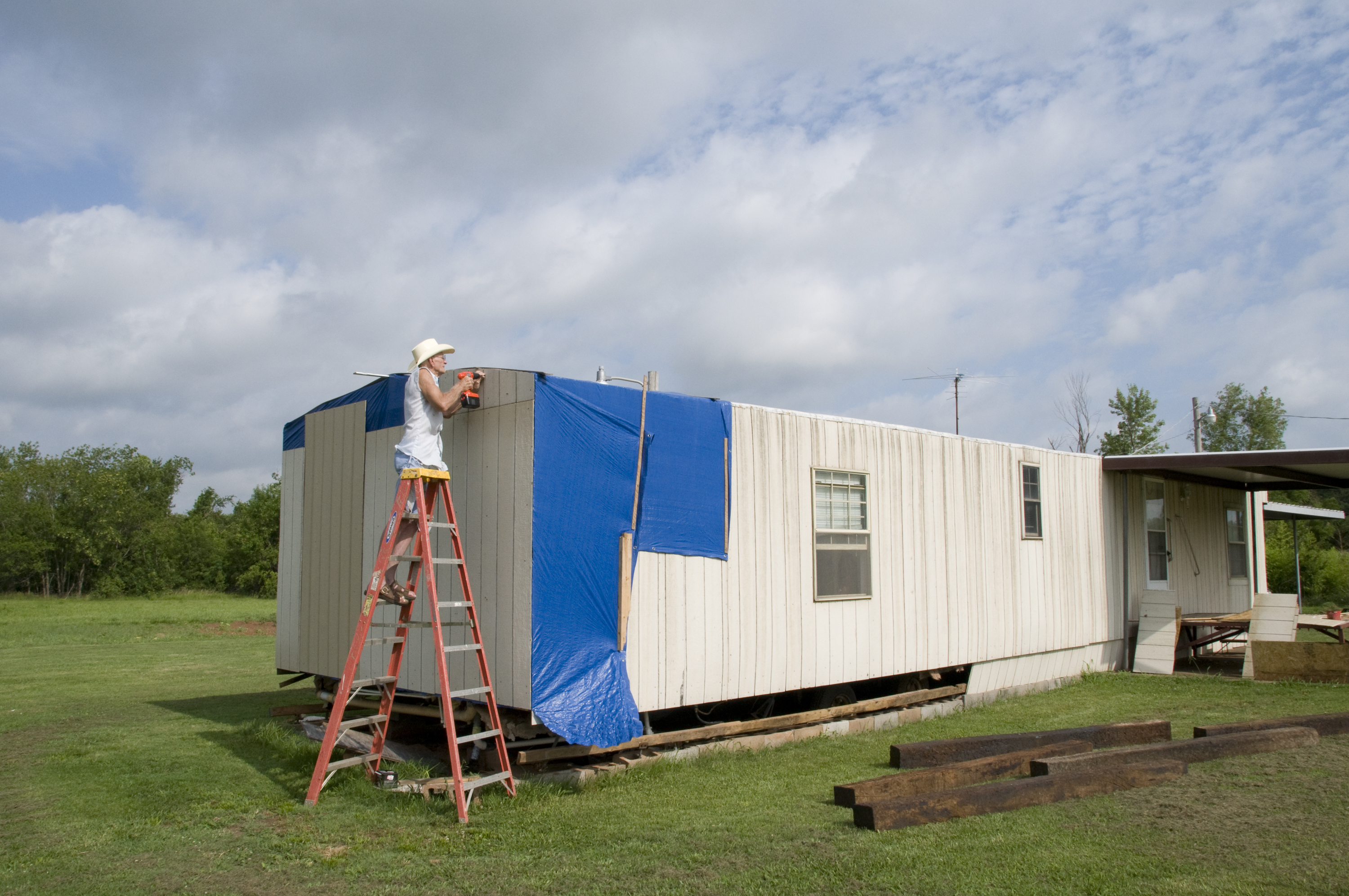
A mobile home being repaired in Oklahoma

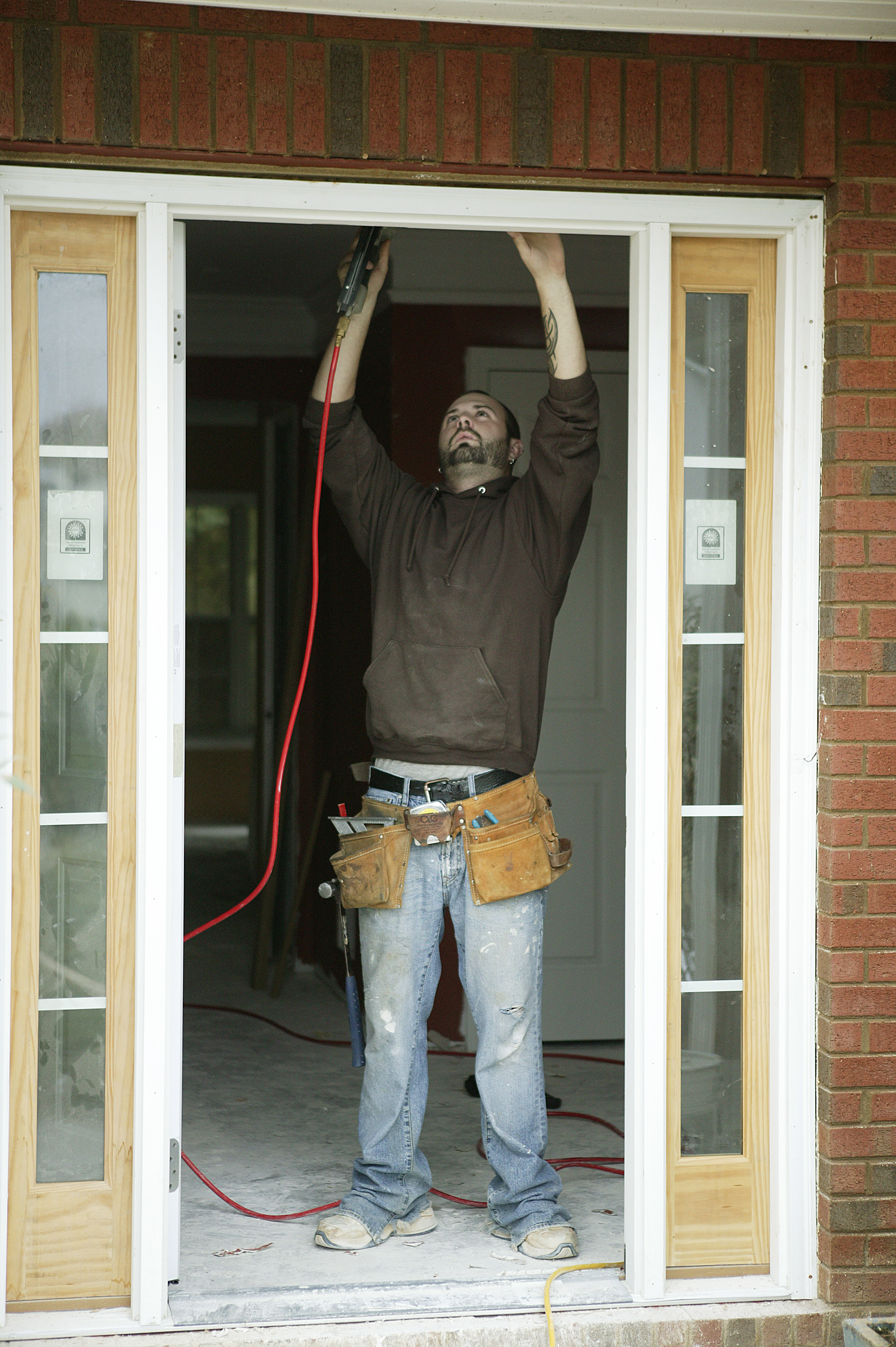
A person making repairs to a house after a flood

Home repair involves the diagnosis and resolution of problems in a home, and is related to home maintenance to avoid such problems. Many types of repairs are "do it yourself" (DIY) projects, while others may be so complicated, time-consuming or risky as to require the assistance of a qualified handyperson, property manager, contractor/builder, or other professionals.

Home repair is not the same as renovation, although many improvements can result from repairs or maintenance. Often the costs of larger repairs will justify the alternative of investment in full-scale improvements. It may make just as much sense to upgrade a home system (with an improved one) as to repair it or incur ever-more-frequent and expensive maintenance for an inefficient, obsolete or dying system.

== Worn, consumed, dull, dirty, clogged ==
Repairs often mean simple replacement of worn or used components intended to be periodically renewed by a home-owner. Another class of home repairs relates to restoring something to a useful condition, such as sharpening tools or utensils, replacing leaky faucet washers, cleaning out plumbing traps, rain gutters. Because of the required precision, specialized tools, or hazards, some of these are best left to experts such as a plumber. One emergency repair that may be necessary in this area is overflowing toilets. Most of them have a shut-off valve on a pipe beneath or behind them so that the water supply can be turned off while repairs are made, either by removing a clog or repairing a broken mechanism.

== Broken or damaged ==
Perhaps the most perplexing repairs facing a home-owner are broken or damaged things. In today's era of built-in obsolescence for many products, it is often more convenient to replace something rather than attempt to repair it. A repair person is faced with the tasks of accurately identifying the problem, then finding the materials, supplies, tools and skills necessary to sufficiently effect the repair. Some things, such as broken windows, appliances or furniture can be carried to a repair shop. Other repairs may have some urgency, such as broken water pipes, broken doors, latches or windows, or a leaky roof or water tank, and this factor can certainly justify calling for professional help. A home handyperson may become adept at dealing with immediate repairs, until a professional can be arranged to complete any further required work.

== Emergency repairs ==
Emergencies in a home can happen at any time--from natural disasters, to power loss, to appliance failure and no water--so homeowners and renters should know how to fix a problem.

In many cases, the repairs are DIY or fixable with whatever is around the house. Common repairs would be fixing a leak, broken window, flooding, frozen pipes or clogged toilet. Each problem can have a relatively simple fix, a leaky roof and broken window can be patched, a flood can be pumped out, pipes can be thawed and repaired and toilets can be unclogged with a chemical. For the most part, emergency repairs are not permanent. They are what you can do fast to stop the problem then have a professional come in to permanently fix it. Flooding as a result of frozen pipes, clogged toilets or a leaky roof can result in very costly water damage repairs and even potential health issues resulting from mold growth if not addressed in a timely manner.

== Maintenance ==
Periodic maintenance also falls under the general class of home repairs. These are inspections, adjustments, cleaning, or replacements that should be done regularly to ensure proper functioning of all the systems in a house, and to avoid costly emergencies. Examples include annual testing and adjustment of alarm systems, central heating or cooling systems (electrodes, thermocouples, and fuel filters), replacement of water treatment components or air-handling filters, purging of heating radiators and water tanks, defrosting a freezer, vacuum refrigerator coils, refilling dry floor-drain traps with water, cleaning out rain gutters, down spouts and drains, touching up worn house paint and weather seals, and cleaning accumulated creosote out of chimney flues, which may be best left to a chimney sweep.

Examples of less frequent home maintenance that should be regularly forecast and budgeted include repainting or staining outdoor wood or metal, repainting masonry, waterproofing masonry, cleaning out septic systems, replacing sacrificial electrodes in water heaters, replacing old washing machine hoses (preferably with stainless steel hoses less likely to burst and cause a flood), and other home improvements such as replacement of obsolete or ageing systems with limited useful lifetimes (water heaters, wood stoves, pumps, and asphaltic or wooden roof shingles and siding.

Often on the bottom of people's to-do list are home maintenance chores, such as landscaping, window and gutter cleaning, power washing of siding/hard-scape, etc. However, these maintenance chores pay for themselves over time. Lack of maintenance will cost more due to higher costs associated with repairs or replacements to be made later.

Injury can occur when operating heavy machinery, climbing ladders, or working on roofs around a home, so one's physical condition should be taken into account before taking part in these activities. It requires effort and specific knowledge to repair and maintain a home, but it can be beneficial to perform even minor repairs.

== Avoiding costly repairs ==
Another related issue for avoiding costly repairs (or disasters) is the proper operation of a home, including systems and appliances, in a way that prevents damage or prolongs their usefulness. For example, at higher latitudes, even a clean rain gutter can suddenly build up an ice dam in winter, forcing melt water into unprotected roofing, resulting in leaks or even flooding inside walls or rooms. This can be prevented by installing moisture barrier beneath the roofing tiles. A wary home-owner should be alert to the conditions that can result in larger problems and take remedial action before damage or injury occurs. It may be easier to tack down a bit of worn carpet than repair a large patch damaged by prolonged misuse. Another example is to seek out the source of unusual noises or smells when mechanical, electrical or plumbing systems are operating—sometimes they indicate incipient problems. One should avoid overloading or otherwise misusing systems, and a recurring overload may indicate time for an upgrade.

Water infiltration is one of the most insidious sources of home damage. Small leaks can lead to water stains, and rotting wood. Soft, rotten wood is an inviting target for termites and other wood-damaging insects. Left unattended, a small leak can lead to significant structural damage, necessitating the replacement of beams and framing.

== Remediation of environmental problems ==
When a home is sold, inspections are performed that may reveal environmental hazards such as radon gas in the basement or water supply or friable asbestos materials (both of which can cause lung cancer), peeling or disturbed lead paint (a risk to children and pregnant women), in-ground heating oil tanks that may contaminate ground water, or mold that can cause problems for those with asthma or allergies. Typically the buyer or mortgage lender will require these conditions to be repaired before allowing the purchase to close. An entire industry of environmental remediation contractors has developed to help home owners resolve these types of problems.

== See also ==
- Handyperson
- Housekeeping
- Home improvement
- Home wiring
- Heating, ventilation, and air conditioning (HVAC)
- Maintenance, repair, and operations
- Plumbing
- Repair and deduct, in landlord–tenant law
- Right to repair
- Smoke alarm
- Winterization
