= Ker v. Illinois =

1886 U.S. Supreme Court case on the rights of forcibly-extradited fugitives

- Supreme Court of the United States

Argued April 27, 1886 Decided December 6, 1886
- Full case name: Frederick Ker v. People of the State of Illinois
- Citations: 119 U.S. 436 (more) 7 S. Ct. 225; 30 L. Ed. 421; 1886 U.S. LEXIS 2007

Case history
- Prior: Writ of Error to the Supreme Court of the State of Illinois

Holding
- There is no language in the 1870 Treaty of Extradition between the U.S. and Peru, which says in terms that a party fleeing from the U.S. to escape punishment for crime becomes thereby entitled to an asylum in the country to which Ker has fled.

Court membership
- Chief Justice Morrison Waite Associate Justices Samuel F. Miller · Stephen J. Field; Joseph P. Bradley · John M. Harlan; William B. Woods · Stanley Matthews; Horace Gray · Samuel Blatchford

Case opinion
- Majority: Miller, joined by unanimous

Ker v. Illinois, 119 U.S. 436 (1886), is a United States Supreme Court case in which the Court unanimously held that a fugitive kidnapped from abroad and taken back to the U.S. to be tried for a crime may be tried, regardless of the legality of the kidnapping.

The incident that led to this decision involved a Pinkerton Detective Agency agent, Henry Julian, was hired by the federal government to collect a larcenist, Frederick Ker, who had fled to Peru. Although Julian had the necessary extradition papers—the two governments had negotiated an extradition treaty a decade earlier—he found that there was no official to meet his request due to the recent Chilean military occupation of Lima. Rather than return home empty-handed, Julian kidnapped the fugitive, with assistance from Chilean forces, and placed him on a U.S. vessel heading back to the United States.

== See also ==
- List of United States Supreme Court cases, volume 119
- Ker-Frisbie Doctrine
- United States v. Rauscher, 119 U.S. 407 (1886)
- Frisbie v. Collins, 342 U.S. 519 (1952)
- United States v. Verdugo-Urquidez, 494 U.S. 259 (1990)
- United States v. Alvarez-Machain, 504 U.S. 655 (1992)
