= Ker–Frisbie doctrine =

US criminal law doctrine on jurisdiction

The Ker–Frisbie doctrine is applied in the context of jurisdiction and holds that courts generally have jurisdiction over criminal defendants in the United States regardless of whether their presence before the court has been lawfully secured.

== History ==
In Ker v. Illinois, 119 U.S. 436 (1886), a messenger forcibly kidnapped the defendant from Peru and brought him back to the United States, even though the messenger had been sent to Peru with a valid warrant and instructions to obtain the defendant with the cooperation of the local authorities. Addressing Ker's due process challenge, the Supreme Court of the United States held that "such forcible abduction is no sufficient reason why the party should not answer when brought within the jurisdiction of the court which has the right to try him for such an offence, and presents no valid objection to his trial in such court".

Frisbie v. Collins, 342 U.S. 519 (1952), presented a case in which the defendant was tried and convicted in Michigan after being abducted by Michigan authorities from Chicago, Illinois. Applying its decision in Ker, the Supreme Court upheld the conviction over challenges based on due process and federal kidnapping laws.

More recently, the Supreme Court relied on the Ker–Frisbie doctrine in United States v. Alvarez-Machain, 504 U.S. 655 (1992). Álvarez Machaín, a Mexican citizen, was abducted and brought to the United States at the direction of the Drug Enforcement Administration. The Court rejected the argument that such abductions undermine the usefulness of extradition treaties, and it refused to read general principles of international law weighing against such abductions into the Mexican extradition treaty.

== See also ==
- Extraordinary rendition
