= Repair and deduct =

Principle of landlord-tenant law

Repair and deduct is a principle of landlord–tenant law in the United States regarding a tenant's legal right to repair defects or damages that the landlord has neglected to repair, and then deduct the value of the repair (parts, labor, etc.) from the next rent payment. Within the United States, the availability to tenants of a right to repair and deduct, varies on a state-by-state basis. In the state of California, tenants may exercise the repair and deduct right up to two times in a single 12-month period.

== See also ==
- Self-help (law)
