= ReachLocal =

LocaliQ
- Type: Division
- Industry: Online marketing
- Founded: 2003
- Headquarters: Woodland Hills, California, United States
- Area served: North America; Australia; New Zealand
- Revenue: $514.07 million (As of 2013)
- Parent: Gannett

LocaliQ. (Formerly ReachLocal), a division of USA Today Co. (formerly Gannett), is a provider of digital marketing solutions to businesses in the United States, Canada, Australia, and New Zealand. The business operates as LocaliQ in the United States, Canada and the United Kingdom.

== History ==
ReachLocal was founded in 2003 by Zorik Gordon, Nathan Hanks, Michael Kline, Robert Wright, John Mazur, and Robert "Rick" Spitz.

ReachLocal's first product was a search engine advertising service called ReachSearch. This technology places businesses’ advertisements on multiple search engines, including Google, Yahoo! and Bing. ReachLocal has since introduced a range of digital marketing products, including ReachEdge, its lead conversion software.

In 2010, ReachLocal launched its initial public offering (IPO). Before the company's IPO, ReachLocal was venture-backed by VantagePoint Venture Partners, Rho Ventures and Galleon Special Opportunities Partners Fund LP.

In February 2011, ReachLocal acquired DealOn, a local deals company for approximately $10 million.

In April 2014, ReachLocal appointed Sharon Rowlands as chief executive officer and member of its board of directors, replacing interim CEO David Carlick.

In June 2016, the company was acquired by Gannett for about $156 million.

In January 2019, Gannett named Kevin Gentzel, who became the media company's first chief revenue officer in 2015, as president of USA TODAY Network Marketing Solutions, when Sharon Rowlands was appointed the CEO of Web.com.

In February 2023, ReachLocal became LocaliQ in the United States and Canada.

== Staff and clients ==
As of March 2017, ReachLocal had over 1,300 employees across 68 offices located in the United States, Australia, Brazil, Canada, Mexico, Germany, the Netherlands, New Zealand, Singapore, Austria, India, Belgium, and Japan. As of February 2016, the company had more than 17,000 active clients.

== Services ==
In addition to search engine marketing, ReachLocal provides other online marketing services. In 2005, the company launched ReachSearch, a search engine advertising product designed to attract more leads from consumers. The product achieves this by placing text advertisements on leading search engines and directories.

In 2009, ReachLocal introduced ReachDisplay, an online display advertising service that places banner advertisements on premium websites. The following year, the company built ReachCast, a web marketing service, and launched a site retargeting product called ReachRemarketing in 2011.

ReachRetargeting was launched in 2012, followed by the launch of the website and lead management system ReachEdge in 2013. In 2014, ReachLocal introduced a search engine optimization service, ReachSEO. In 2015, ReachLocal launched ReachListings, for local listings management. In 2016, ReachLocal launched ReachSocial Ads, Facebook advertising, and enhanced their SEO product, ReachSEO.

== Technology ==
The company has developed various technologies to assist their clients in publishing their campaigns and tracking, optimizing and reporting results for a variety of their services. In September 2012, the company released the first ReachLocal mobile application, which provides real-time lead notifications and reports to their clients, followed by the ReachEdge app in 2013.

ReachEdge, the company's marketing automation platform released in 2013, provides clients with a list of leads, sources, actions needed, performance and reports. The platform consists of a website, lead management software and the aforementioned mobile application.

In February 2014, ReachLocal released LigerMobile, an open source framework that assists in the development of hybrid apps.
