= Male captus bene detentus =

Legal doctrine

Male captus, bene detentus (wrongly captured, properly detained) is a legal doctrine, according to which the fact that a person may have been wrongly or unfairly arrested, will not prejudice a rightful detention or trial under due process.

== Practice ==
There is state practice in support of the doctrine, as well as contrary state practice. In one of its cases the U.S. Supreme Court held that where a person from another country is apprehended by irregular means, the right to set up as defense the unlawful manner by which he was brought to a court belongs "to the Government from whose territory he was wrongfully taken".
