= Sosa v. Alvarez-Machain =

- Supreme Court of the United States

Argued March 30, 2004 Decided June 29, 2004
- Full case name: Jose Francisco Sosa v. Humberto Alvarez-Machain, et al.
- Docket no.: 03-339
- Citations: 542 U.S. 692 (more) 124 S. Ct. 2739; 159 L. Ed. 2d 718; 2004 U.S. LEXIS 4763; 72 U.S.L.W. 4660; 158 Oil & Gas Rep. 601; 2004 Fla. L. Weekly Fed. S 515
- Argument: Oral argument

Case history
- Prior: On writ of certiorari to the U.S. Court of Appeal for the Ninth Circuit.

Holding
- The Federal Tort Claims Act's exception to waiver of sovereign immunity for claims "arising in a foreign country" bars claims based on any injury suffered in a foreign country, regardless of where the tortious act or omission occurred.

Court membership
- Chief Justice William Rehnquist Associate Justices John P. Stevens · Sandra Day O'Connor; Antonin Scalia · Anthony Kennedy; David Souter · Clarence Thomas; Ruth Bader Ginsburg · Stephen Breyer

Case opinions
- Majority: Souter, joined by unanimous (Parts I and III); Rehnquist, Stevens, O'Connor, Scalia, Kennedy, Thomas (Part II); Stevens, O'Connor, Kennedy, Ginsburg, Breyer (Part IV)
- Concurrence: Scalia (in part), joined by Rehnquist, Thomas
- Concurrence: Ginsburg (in part), joined by Breyer
- Concurrence: Breyer (in part)

Laws applied
- Alien Tort Statute

Sosa v. Alvarez-Machain, 542 U.S. 692 (2004), was a United States Supreme Court case involving the Alien Tort Statute and the Federal Tort Claims Act. Many ATS claims were filed after the Second Circuit ruling in Filártiga v. Peña-Irala created a new common law cause of action for torture under the ATS: "For purposes of civil liability, the torturer has become—like the pirate and slave trader before him—hostis humani generis, an enemy of all mankind." The Court in Sosa does not find there is a similar cause of action for arbitrary arrest and detention. They wrote that finding new common law causes of action based on international norms would require "a substantial element of discretionary judgment", and explain that the role of common law has changed since ATS was enacted meaning the Court will "look for legislative guidance before exercising innovative authority over substantive law".

The decision states some limitations on recognizing (or creating) new federal common law causes of action under the ATS: "norms of international character accepted by the civilized world and defined with a specificity comparable to the features of those three 18th century paradigms we have recognized".

== Background ==
Kiki Camarena, an agent of the Drug Enforcement Administration (DEA), was kidnapped and murdered by a Mexican drug cartel in 1985. After an investigation, the DEA concluded that Humberto Álvarez-Machaín had participated in the murder. A warrant for his arrest was issued by a federal district court. The DEA, however, was unable to convince Mexico to extradite Álvarez-Machaín, so they hired several Mexican nationals to capture him and bring him back to the United States. His subsequent trial was appealed all the way to the Supreme Court, which found that the government could try a person who had been forcibly abducted, but that the abduction itself might violate international law and provide grounds for a civil suit. When the case went back to the district court for trial, Álvarez-Machaín was found not guilty for lack of evidence.

Álvarez-Machaín then filed a group of civil suits in federal court against the United States and the Mexican nationals who had captured him under the Federal Tort Claims Act (FTCA), which allows the federal government to be sued on tort claims, and the Alien Tort Statute (ATS), which permits suits against foreign citizens in American courts. The government argued that the FTCA applied only to claims arising from actions that took place in the United States and therefore did not cover Álvarez-Machaín's case because the arrest took place in Mexico. Further, the government and the Mexican nationals argued that the ATS gave federal courts jurisdiction to hear tort claims against foreign citizens, but did not allow private individuals to bring those suits.

The federal district court disagreed with the government's contention that the FTCA claim did not apply, finding that the plan to capture Alvarez-Machain was developed on U.S. soil and therefore covered. However, the court then ruled that the DEA had acted lawfully when they arrested Alvarez-Machain and was therefore not liable. On the ATS claims, the court rejected the argument that private individuals could not bring suit under the Act. The court found that José Francisco Sosa, one of the Mexican nationals who kidnapped Álvarez-Machaín, had violated international law and was therefore liable under the ATS.

On appeal, the Ninth Circuit Court of Appeals overturned the district court's FTCA decision, ruling that the DEA could not authorize a citizen's arrest of Alvarez-Machain in another country and was therefore liable. The appeals court did, however, affirm the lower court's finding on the ATS claim, upholding the judgment against Sosa.

== Issue ==
The Court was tasked with deciding whether the Alien Tort Statute permits private individuals to bring suit against foreign citizens for crimes committed in other countries in violation of the law of nations or treaties of the United States, and whether an individual may bring suit under the Federal Tort Claims Act for an arbitrary arrest that was planned in the United States but carried out in a foreign country.

== Decision ==
On June 29, 2004, the Supreme Court unanimously voted in favor of Sosa and reversed the lower court. On the Alien Tort Statute claim, the Court unanimously ruled that it did not create a separate ground of suit for violations of the law of nations. Instead, it was intended only to give courts jurisdiction over violations accepted by the civilized world and defined with specificity comparable to the features of the 18th-century paradigms (piracy, ambassadors, and safe conduct). Because Alvarez-Machain's claim did not fall into one of the traditional categories, it was not permitted.

On the FTCA claim, the Court ruled that the arrest had taken place outside the United States and so was exempted from the Act. The Court rejected Alvarez-Machain's argument that the exemption should not apply because the arrest had been planned in the United States.
