= Handyman =

Person who works in general building maintenance

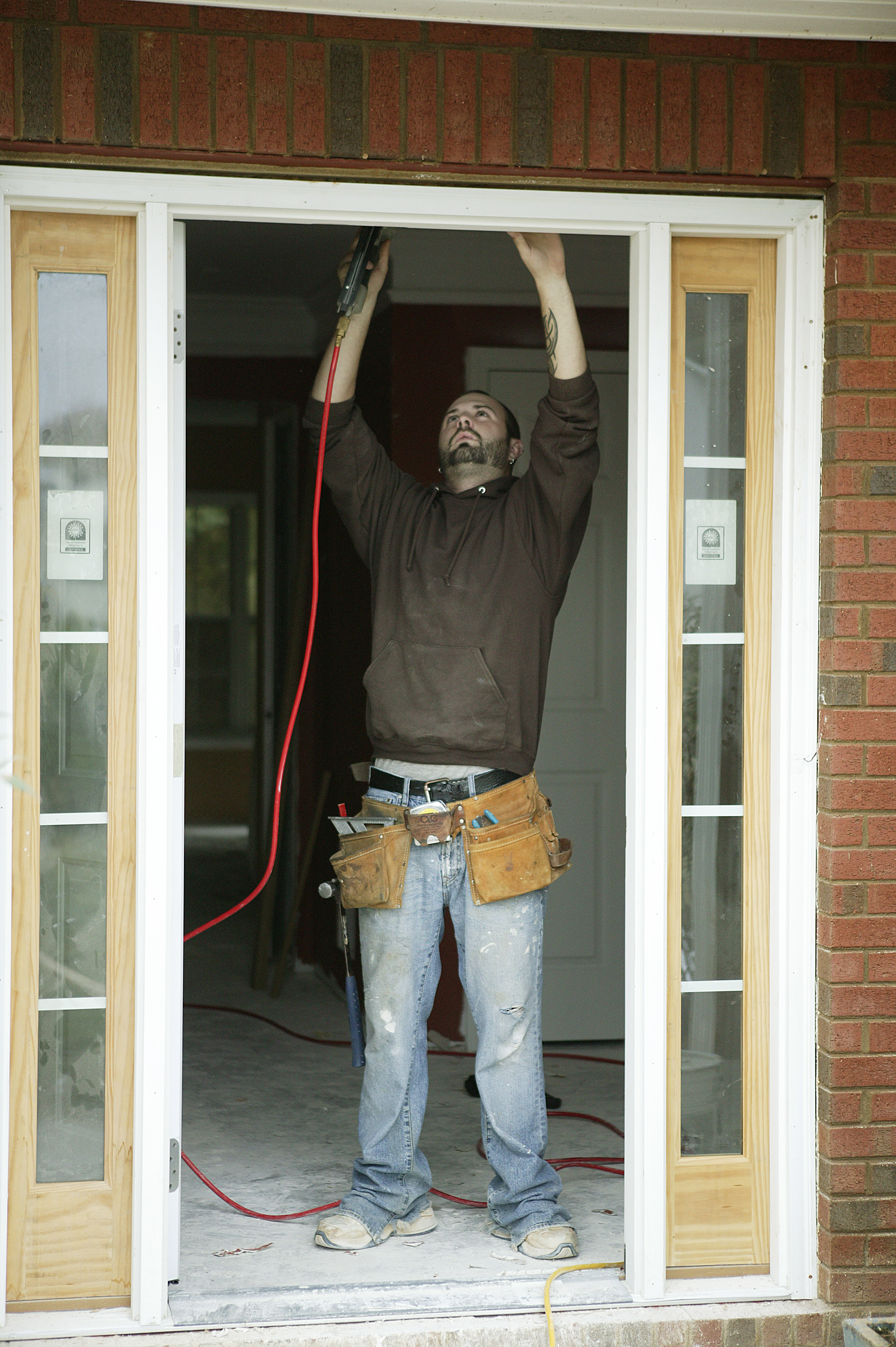
A handyman working on a door frame

A handyman, also known as a handyperson or handyworker, maintenance worker, maintenance man, repairman, repair worker, or repair technician, is a person who is knowledgeable in skills such as basic carpentry, plumbing, minor electrical wiring and property maintenance. They can perform a wide range of repairs, typically for keeping buildings, shops or equipment around the home in good condition. These tasks include trade skills, repair work, maintenance work, are both interior and exterior, and are sometimes described as "side work", "odd jobs" or "fix-up tasks". Specifically, these jobs could be light plumbing jobs such as fixing a leaky toilet or light electric jobs such as changing a light fixture or bulb.

The term handyman increasingly describes a paid worker, but it also includes non-paid homeowners or do-it-yourselfers. The term handyman is also occasionally applied as an adjective to describe politicians or business leaders who make substantial organizational changes, such as overhauling a business structure or administrative division.

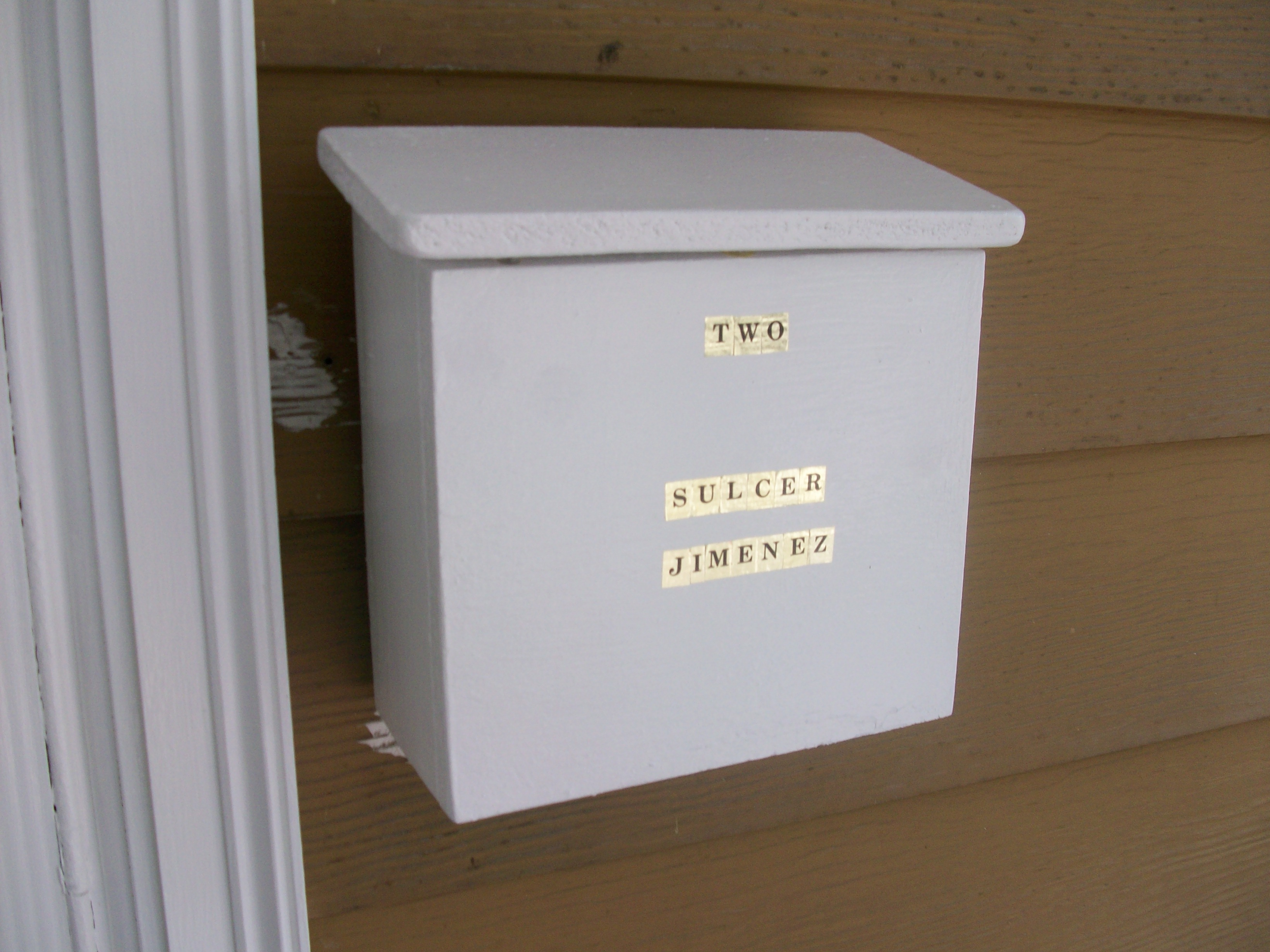
A handyman built this mailbox from particle board, with hinges, and exterior paint; the rounded edges were made with a sander.

== Projects ==
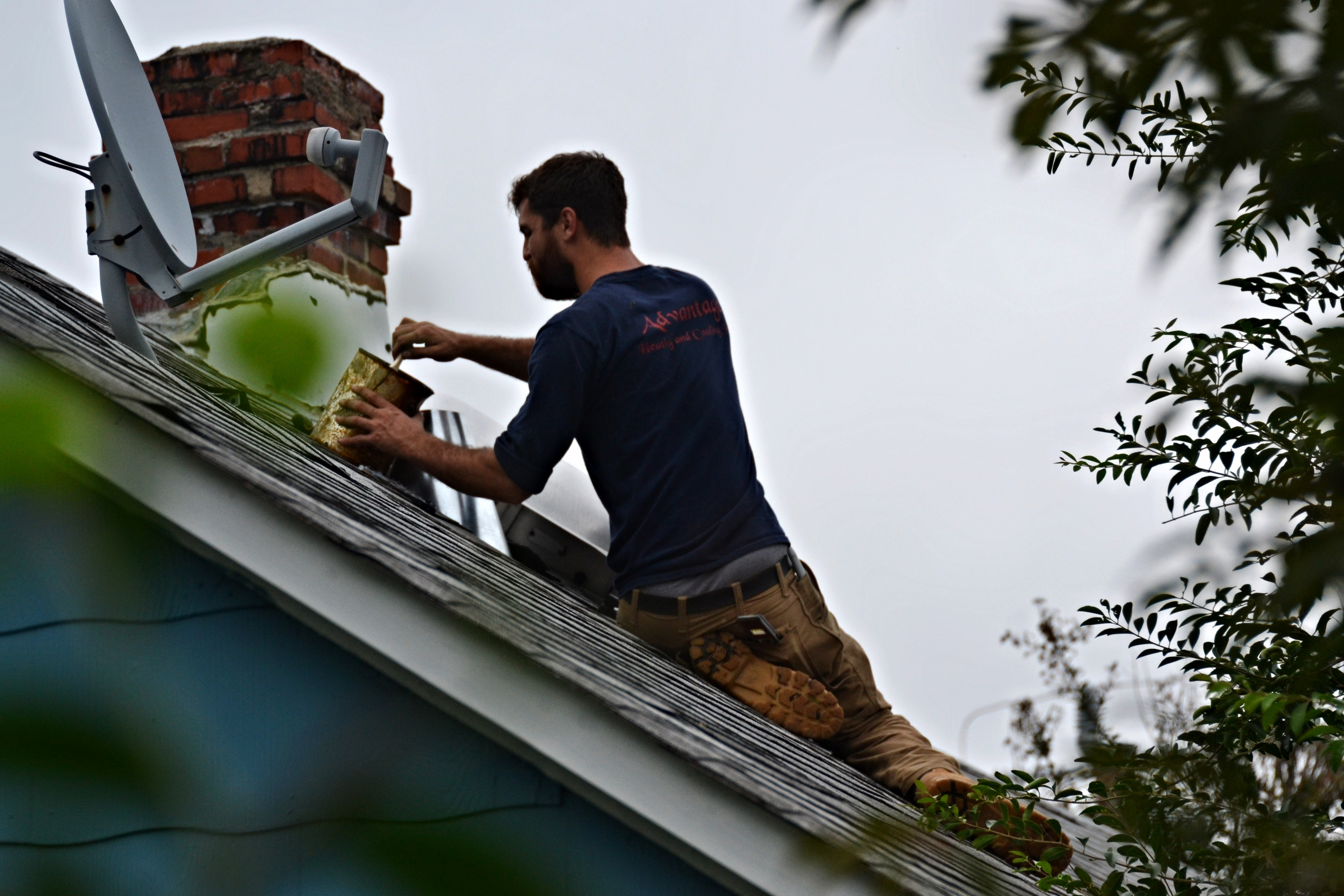
This project replacing an air conditioning vent on a roof.

Tasks range from minor to major, from unskilled to highly skilled, and include painting, drywall repair, remodeling, minor plumbing work, minor electrical work, household carpentry, sheetrock, crown moulding, and furniture assembly.

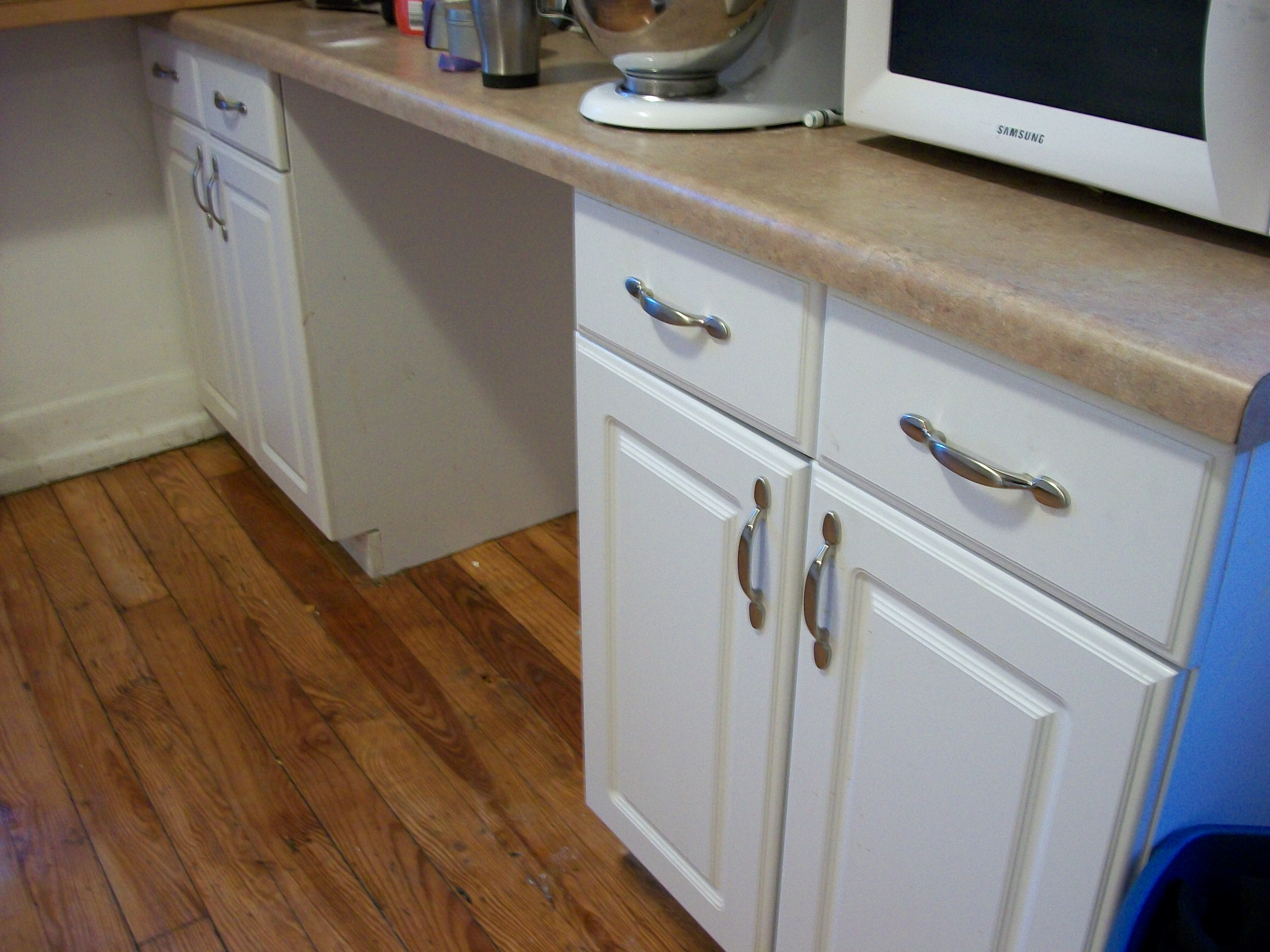
Installing kitchen cabinets is a medium-level handyworker job, with multiple steps.

== Businesses ==
=== Market estimates ===
An estimate was that in 2003, the market in the United States for home-maintenance and repair spending was up 14% from 2001 to 2003. Another estimate was that the market in the United States was $126 billion and was increasing by about 4% annually. American homes are aging; one estimate was that in 2007, more than half of all homes are older than 25 years. And, as populations worldwide tend to become older, on average, and since increasingly elderly people will be less inclined and able to maintain their homes, it is likely that demand for handyman services will grow.

=== Franchise businesses ===
In 2009 in the US, there were national handyman service firms which handle such nationwide tasks as public relations, marketing, advertising, and signage, but sell specific territories to franchise owners. A franchise contract typically gives a franchise owner the exclusive right to take service calls within a given geographical area. The websites of these firms put possible customers in touch with local owners, which have handymen and trucks. Customers call the local numbers. Typically, these firms charge around $100/hour, although fees vary by locality and time of year. In many parts of the world, there are professional handyworker firms that do small home or commercial projects which claim possible advantages such as having workers who are insured and licensed. Their branch offices schedule service appointments for full-time and part-time handymen to visit and make repairs, and sometimes coordinate with sub-contractors.

Some see a benefit of franchising as "entrepreneurship under the safety net of a tried-and-true business umbrella" but forecast a 1.2 percent decrease in franchise businesses during the 2008–2009 recession. In 2005, according to a survey released by the Washington-based International Franchise Association showed 909,000 franchised establishments in the United States employing some 11 million people. Franchises offer training, advertising and information technology support, lower procurement costs and access to a network of established operators.

Franchise handyman firms sometimes pitch clients by asking prospective customers about their unresolved "to-do lists". The firm does odd jobs, carpentry, and repairs. Trends such as a "poverty of time" and a "glut of unhandy husbands" has spurred the business. Technicians do a range of services including tile work, painting, and wallpapering. "One firm" charges $88 per hour. The firm targets a work category which full-fledged remodelers and contractors find unprofitable. A consumer was quoted by a reporter explaining the decision to hire one firm: "'I couldn't find anyone to come in and help me because the jobs were too small', said Meg Beck of Huntington, who needed some painting and carpentry done. She turned to one franchise firm and said she liked the fact that the service has well-marked trucks and uniformed technicians and that a dispatcher called with the names of the crew before they showed up." There are indications that these businesses are growing. There are different firms operating.

Other competitors include online referral services. In addition, some large home centers offer installation services for products such as cabinets and carpet installation.

== See also ==
- The Handyman
- Canada's Worst Handyman, a Canadian reality show

== See also ==
- Do it yourself
- Home improvement
- Home repair
- Tradesman
