= List of United States Supreme Court cases, volume 119 =

Supreme Court of the United States
- Interactive map of Supreme Court of the United States
- 38°53′26″N 77°00′16″W
- Established: March 4, 1789; 236 years ago
- Location: Washington, D.C.
- Coordinates: 38°53′26″N 77°00′16″W
- Composition method: Presidential nomination with Senate confirmation
- Authorised by: Constitution of the United States, Art. III, § 1
- Judge term length: life tenure, subject to impeachment and removal
- Number of positions: 9 (by statute)
- Website: supremecourt.gov

This is a list of cases reported in volume 119 of United States Reports, decided by the Supreme Court of the United States in 1886 and 1887.

== Justices of the Supreme Court at the time of volume 119 U.S. ==
The Supreme Court is established by Article III, Section 1 of the Constitution of the United States, which says: "The judicial Power of the United States, shall be vested in one supreme Court . . .". The size of the Court is not specified; the Constitution leaves it to Congress to set the number of justices. Under the Judiciary Act of 1789 Congress originally fixed the number of justices at six (one chief justice and five associate justices). Since 1789 Congress has varied the size of the Court from six to seven, nine, ten, and back to nine justices (always including one chief justice).

When the cases in volume 119 U.S. were decided the Court comprised the following nine members:

Portrait	Justice	Office	Home State	Succeeded	Date confirmed by the Senate (Vote)	Tenure on Supreme Court
	Morrison Waite	Chief Justice	Ohio	Salmon P. Chase	January 21, 1874 (63–0)	March 4, 1874 – March 23, 1888 (Died)
	Samuel Freeman Miller	Associate Justice	Iowa	Peter Vivian Daniel	July 16, 1862 (Acclamation)	July 21, 1862 – October 13, 1890 (Died)
	Stephen Johnson Field	Associate Justice	California	newly created seat	March 10, 1863 (Acclamation)	May 10, 1863 – December 1, 1897 (Retired)
	Joseph P. Bradley	Associate Justice	New Jersey	newly created seat	March 21, 1870 (46–9)	March 23, 1870 – January 22, 1892 (Died)
	John Marshall Harlan	Associate Justice	Kentucky	David Davis	November 29, 1877 (Acclamation)	December 10, 1877 – October 14, 1911 (Died)
	William Burnham Woods	Associate Justice	Georgia	William Strong	December 21, 1880 (39–8)	January 5, 1881 – May 14, 1887 (Died)
	Stanley Matthews	Associate Justice	Ohio	Noah Haynes Swayne	May 12, 1881 (24–23)	May 17, 1881 – March 22, 1889 (Died)
	Horace Gray	Associate Justice	Massachusetts	Nathan Clifford	December 20, 1881 (51–5)	January 9, 1882 – September 15, 1902 (Died)
	Samuel Blatchford	Associate Justice	New York	Ward Hunt	March 22, 1882 (Acclamation)	April 3, 1882 – July 7, 1893 (Died)

== Citation style ==
Under the Judiciary Act of 1789 the federal court structure at the time comprised District Courts, which had general trial jurisdiction; Circuit Courts, which had mixed trial and appellate (from the US District Courts) jurisdiction; and the United States Supreme Court, which had appellate jurisdiction over the federal District and Circuit courts—and for certain issues over state courts. The Supreme Court also had limited original jurisdiction (i.e., in which cases could be filed directly with the Supreme Court without first having been heard by a lower federal or state court). There were one or more federal District Courts and/or Circuit Courts in each state, territory, or other geographical region.

Bluebook citation style is used for case names, citations, and jurisdictions.

- "C.C.D." = United States Circuit Court for the District of . . .
  - e.g.,"C.C.D.N.J." = United States Circuit Court for the District of New Jersey
- "D." = United States District Court for the District of . . .
  - e.g.,"D. Mass." = United States District Court for the District of Massachusetts
- "E." = Eastern; "M." = Middle; "N." = Northern; "S." = Southern; "W." = Western
  - e.g.,"C.C.S.D.N.Y." = United States Circuit Court for the Southern District of New York
  - e.g.,"M.D. Ala." = United States District Court for the Middle District of Alabama
- "Ct. Cl." = United States Court of Claims
- The abbreviation of a state's name alone indicates the highest appellate court in that state's judiciary at the time.
  - e.g.,"Pa." = Supreme Court of Pennsylvania
  - e.g.,"Me." = Supreme Judicial Court of Maine

== List of cases in volume 119 U.S. ==
Case Name	Page and year	Opinion of the Court	Concurring opinion(s)	Dissenting opinion(s)	Lower Court	Disposition
Choctaw Nation v. United States	1 (1886)	Matthews	None	Waite	Ct. Cl.	reversed
Consolidated Safety Valve Company v. Kunkle	45 (1886)	Blatchford	None	None	C.C.N.D. Ill.	affirmed
White v. Dunbar	47 (1886)	Bradley	None	None	C.C.E.D. La.	reversed
Dainese v. Kendall	53 (1886)	Waite	None	None	Sup. Ct. D.C.	dismissed
Buttz v. Northern Pacific Railway Company	55 (1886)	Field	None	None	Sup. Ct. Terr. Dakota	affirmed
Town of Oregon v. Jennings	74 (1886)	Blatchford	None	None	C.C.N.D. Ill.	affirmed
Palmer v. Hussey	96 (1886)	Waite	None	None	N.Y. Sup. Ct.	affirmed
Vicksburg and Meridian Railroad Company v. O'Brien	99 (1886)	Harlan	None	Field	C.C.S.D. Miss.	reversed
Philadelphia Fire Association v. New York	110 (1886)	Blatchford	None	Harlan	N.Y. Sup. Ct.	affirmed
Home Insurance Company v. New York	129 (1886)	Waite	None	None	N.Y. Sup. Ct.	affirmed
Shipman v. District of Columbia	148 (1886)	Waite	None	None	Ct. Cl.	affirmed
Minneapolis and St. Louis Railway Company v. Columbus Rolling Mill	149 (1886)	Gray	None	None	C.C.S.D. Ohio	affirmed
French v. Hall	152 (1886)	Matthews	None	None	C.C.D. Colo.	reversed
Hanrick v. Patrick	156 (1886)	Matthews	None	None	C.C.N.D. Tex.	affirmed
Washington County v. Sallinger	176 (1886)	Matthews	None	None	C.C.E.D.N.C.	affirmed
Freeman v. Alderson	185 (1886)	Field	None	None	C.C.N.D. Tex.	affirmed
Willamette Manufacturing Company v. Bank of British Columbia	191 (1886)	Miller	None	None	C.C.D. Or.	affirmed
The Harrisburg	199 (1886)	Waite	None	None	C.C.E.D. Pa.	reversed
Crow v. Oxford Township	215 (1886)	Blatchford	None	None	C.C.D. Kan.	affirmed
Hapgood v. Hewitt	226 (1886)	Blatchford	None	None	C.C.D. Ind.	affirmed
Story v. Black	235 (1886)	Waite	None	None	Sup. Ct. Terr. Mont.	dismissed
Continental Life Insurance Company v. Rhoads	237 (1886)	Waite	None	None	C.C.E.D. Pa.	reversed
East Tennessee, Virginia and Georgia Railway Company v. Grayson	240 (1886)	Waite	None	None	C.C.N.D. Ala.	affirmed
Cunard Steamship Company v. Carey	245 (1886)	Waite	None	None	C.C.S.D.N.Y.	affirmed
Newhall v. Le Breton	259 (1886)	Harlan	None	None	C.C.D. Cal.	affirmed
City of New Orleans v. Houston	265 (1886)	Matthews	None	None	C.C.E.D. La.	affirmed
Hamilton v. Vicksburg, Shreveport and Pacific Railway Company	280 (1886)	Field	None	None	La.	affirmed
Schmidt Brothers v. Cobb	286 (1886)	Waite	None	None	C.C.N.D. Iowa	affirmed
New York, Lake Erie and Western Railroad v. Nickals	296 (1886)	Harlan	None	None	C.C.S.D.N.Y.	reversed
R.D. Wood and Company v. City of Fort Wayne	312 (1886)	Blatchford	None	None	C.C.D. Ind.	reversed
Clark v. Wooster	322 (1886)	Bradley	None	None	C.C.S.D.N.Y.	affirmed
McCreery v. Haskell	327 (1886)	Field	None	None	Cal.	affirmed
Pomace Holder Company v. Ferguson	335 (1886)	Blatchford	None	None	C.C.N.D.N.Y.	affirmed
Donnelly v. District of Columbia	339 (1886)	Waite	None	None	Ct. Cl.	affirmed
Halsted v. Buster	341 (1886)	Waite	None	None	C.C.D.W. Va.	reversed
Coit v. North Carolina Gold Amalgamating Company	343 (1886)	Field	None	None	C.C.E.D. Pa.	affirmed
Buzard v. Houston	347 (1886)	Gray	None	Bradley	C.C.W.D. Tex.	reversed
Kramer v. Cohn	355 (1886)	Gray	None	None	W.D. Ark.	affirmed
Williamsport National Bank v. Knapp	357 (1886)	Gray	None	None	C.C.W.D. Pa.	dismissed
Wylie v. Northampton National Bank	361 (1886)	Matthews	None	None	C.C.S.D.N.Y.	affirmed
Newton v. Furst and Bradley Manufacturing Company	373 (1886)	Blatchford	None	None	C.C.N.D. Ill.	affirmed
Street v. Ferry	385 (1886)	Waite	None	None	Sup. Ct. Terr. Utah	dismissed
Wilson v. Blair	387 (1886)	Waite	None	None	C.C.D. Neb.	dismissed
Johnson v. Chicago and Pacific Elevator Company	388 (1886)	Blatchford	None	None	Ill.	affirmed
California Artificial Stone Paving Company v. Schalicke	401 (1886)	Blatchford	None	None	C.C.D. Cal.	affirmed
United States v. Rauscher	407 (1886)	Miller	Gray	Waite	C.C.S.D.N.Y.	certification
Ker v. Illinois	436 (1886)	Miller	None	None	Ill.	affirmed
Campbell v. Laclede Gas-Light Company	445 (1886)	Miller	None	None	Mo.	affirmed
Winchester v. Heiskell, Scott & Heiskell	450 (1886)	Waite	None	None	Tenn.	affirmed
Cleveland, Columbus, Cincinnati and Indianapolis Railway Company v. McClung	454 (1886)	Waite	None	None	C.C.S.D. Ohio	affirmed
Baltimore and Ohio Railroad Company v. Bates	464 (1886)	Waite	None	None	Ohio	reversed
Peper v. Fordyce	469 (1886)	Waite	None	None	C.C.E.D. Ark.	reversed
Germania Insurance Company v. Wisconsin	473 (1886)	Waite	None	None	C.C.W.D. Wis.	affirmed
United States v. Jones	477 (1886)	Waite	None	None	Ct. Cl.	dismissal denied
Greenwich Insurance v. Providence and Stonington Steam-Ship Company	481 (1886)	Bradley	None	None	C.C.S.D.N.Y.	affirmed
Wolverton v. Nichols	485 (1886)	Miller	None	None	Sup. Ct. Terr. Mont.	reversed
Gilbert v. Moline Plow Company	491 (1886)	Miller	None	None	Sup. Ct. Terr. Dakota	affirmed
Bignall v. Gould Manufacturing Company	495 (1886)	Gray	None	None	C.C.E.D. Mo.	affirmed
Thackrah v. Haas	499 (1886)	Gray	None	None	Sup. Ct. Terr. Utah	reversed
Brooks v. Clark	502 (1886)	Waite	None	None	C.C.E.D. Pa.	affirmed
Eldred v. Bell Telephone Company	513 (1886)	Matthews	None	None	C.C.E.D. Mo.	affirmed
Whitford v. Clark County	522 (1886)	Waite	None	None	C.C.E.D. Mo.	reversed
Ashby v. Hall	526 (1886)	Field	None	None	Sup. Ct. Terr. Mont.	affirmed
Sutter v. Robinson	530 (1886)	Matthews	None	None	C.C.N.D. Ill.	reversed
Huse, Loomis and Company v. Glover	543 (1886)	Field	None	None	C.C.N.D. Ill.	affirmed
Goetz and Luening v. Bank of Kansas City	551 (1887)	Field	None	None	C.C.E.D. Wis.	affirmed
Northern Pacific Railway Company v. Paine	561 (1887)	Field	None	None	C.C.D. Minn.	affirmed
Chicago and Northwestern Railway Company v. McLaughlin	566 (1886)	Waite	None	None	C.C.N.D. Iowa	affirmed
Mace v. Merrill	581 (1887)	Waite	None	None	Cal.	dismissed
Ex parte Mirzan	584 (1886)	Waite	None	None	C.C.N.D.N.Y.	habeas corpus denied
Hancock v. Holbrook	586 (1887)	Waite	None	None	C.C.E.D. La.	affirmed
Borer v. Chapman	587 (1887)	Matthews	None	None	C.C.D. Minn.	affirmed
Ivinson v. Hutton	604 (1887)	Miller	None	None	Sup. Ct. Terr. Wyo.	affirmed
Iron Mountain and Helena Railroad Company v. Johnson	608 (1887)	Miller	None	None	E.D. Ark.	affirmed
Ex parte Ralston	613 (1887)	Waite	None	None	La.	mandamus denied
Chicago and Alton Railroad Company v. Wiggins Ferry Company	615 (1887)	Waite	None	None	Mo.	dismissed
Cope v. Vallette Dry Dock Company	625 (1887)	Bradley	None	None	C.C.E.D. La.	affirmed
Sharp v. Riessner	631 (1887)	Blatchford	None	None	C.C.S.D.N.Y.	affirmed
Barrell v. Tilton	637 (1887)	Field	None	None	C.C.D. Or.	affirmed
A.S. Baldwin and J. Levy and Company v. Black	643 (1887)	Blatchford	None	Bradley	C.C.E.D. La.	affirmed
Ives v. Sargent and Company	652 (1887)	Matthews	None	None	C.C.D. Conn.	affirmed
Hartshorn v. Saginaw Barrel Company	664 (1887)	Matthews	None	None	C.C.E.D. Mich.	affirmed
Town of Enfield v. Jordan	680 (1887)	Bradley	None	None	C.C.S.D. Ill.	affirmed
Hubbard v. New York, New England and Western Investment Company	696 (1887)	Matthews	None	None	C.C.D. Mass.	affirmed
