= Humberto Álvarez Machaín =

Mexican physician

- Born: Guadalajara, Mexico
- Occupation: Physician
- Known for: Accused and acquitted for the murder of Enrique Camarena Salazar

Humberto Álvarez Machaín is a physician from Guadalajara, Mexico, who was accused of aiding the torture and killing of the United States Drug Enforcement Administration agent Enrique Camarena Salazar in February 1985. He was acquitted of the charges.

== Abduction ==
After Mexican officials refused to extradite Álvarez without an advance payment of $50,000, the DEA paid local contacts a total of $50,000 to abduct Álvarez into the United States. On April 2, 1990, five to six armed men abducted Álvarez from his office in Guadalajara to a house in Guadalajara. Álvarez claims that he was injected with a sedative and electrically shocked through the soles of his shoes. He was later flown to El Paso, Texas and arrested by federal agents.

In 1990, a federal prosecutor in Los Angeles confirmed that Álvarez had been captured in Mexico by bounty hunters seeking a reward offered by the US government, which gave rise to concerns over the legality of his apprehension. The DEA continued to deny news reports that it had offered a reward of as much as $100,000 for the capture of Álvarez.

In 1992, the Supreme Court ruled in United States v. Alvarez-Machain that the forced abduction of a person from another country (in violation of extradition treaties) does not prevent them from being tried in the United States. The abduction and Supreme Court ruling were publicly opposed by Mexico, Argentina, Bolivia, Brazil, Canada, Chile, China, Colombia, Costa Rica, Cuba, Denmark, Ecuador, Guatemala, Honduras, Iran, Jamaica, Malaysia, Nicaragua, Spain, Switzerland, Uruguay, Venezuela, the Organization of American States, the Caribbean Community, and the Group of Rio. In 1993, the United Nations Working Group on Arbitrary Detention found that Alvarez Machaín's imprisonment was arbitrary, because it lacked legal basis.

== Trial and acquittal ==
Álvarez was indicted by a federal grand jury in Los Angeles in 1990 for alleged complicity in the kidnapping, torture and murder of Enrique “Kiki” Camarena Salazar and his pilot Alfredo Zavala-Avelar in Guadalajara, Mexico, in February 1985. The U.S. District Court for the Central District of California issued a warrant for Álvarez's arrest after his indictment.

Álvarez was tried for Camarena's kidnapping, torture and murder in 1992. After the presentation of the government's case, the district court judge granted Álvarez's motion for judgment of acquittal on the ground of insufficient evidence to support a guilty verdict. The district court specifically concluded that the government's case was based on "suspicion and hunches, but no proof" and that the theory of the prosecution's case was "whole cloth, the wildest speculation". As a result, Álvarez was repatriated to Mexico.

== Lawsuit against the United States ==
In 1993, Álvarez initiated a civil action in the United States District Court for the Central District of California, alleging numerous constitutional and tort claims arising from his abduction, detention, and trial. José Francisco Sosa, Antonio Garate Bustamante, five unnamed Mexican nationals, the United States, and four DEA agents were listed as defendants. The district court ruled in favor of Álvarez in the amount of $25,000, and the U.S. Court of Appeals for the Ninth Circuit affirmed Sosa's liability on appeal.

The U.S. Supreme Court granted certiorari (a review) on December 1, 2003, to determine the issue of whether Álvarez was entitled to remedy, pursuant to the Alien Tort Statute. The Supreme Court held that an illegal detention of a single day did not constitute a sufficient harm for relief.

== See also ==
- Mexican drug war
- Narcos
