= United States v. Alvarez-Machain =

1992 U.S. Supreme Court case on whether abducted persons can be tried as criminals

- Supreme Court of the United States

Argued April 1, 1992 Decided June 15, 1992
- Full case name: United States of America v. Humberto Alvarez-Machain
- Citations: 504 U.S. 655 (more) 112 S. Ct. 2188; 119 L. Ed. 2d 441

Case history
- Prior: 946 F.2d 1466 (9th Cir. 1991); cert. granted, 502 U.S. 1024 (1992).
- Subsequent: On remand, 971 F.2d 310 (9th Cir. 1992).

Holding
- The fact of respondent's forcible abduction from another country does not prohibit his trial in a United States court for violations of American criminal laws.

Court membership
- Chief Justice William Rehnquist Associate Justices Byron White · Harry Blackmun; John P. Stevens · Sandra Day O'Connor; Antonin Scalia · Anthony Kennedy; David Souter · Clarence Thomas

Case opinions
- Majority: Rehnquist, joined by White, Scalia, Kennedy, Souter, Thomas
- Dissent: Stevens, joined by Blackmun, O'Connor

United States v. Alvarez-Machain, 504 U.S. 655 (1992), was a United States Supreme Court case in which the Court held that the respondent's forcible abduction from a foreign country, despite the existence of an extradition treaty with said country, does not prohibit him from being tried before a U.S. court for violations of American criminal laws. The ruling reconfirmed the Ker-Frisbie Doctrine, established in Ker v. Illinois (1886) and Frisbie v. Collins (1952), which generally permits the prosecution of criminal defendants regardless of whether their presence was obtained in accordance with an applicable extradition treaty.

== Background ==
Humberto Álvarez Machaín, a Mexican physician, was allegedly involved in the 1985 kidnapping, torture, and murder of Enrique Camarena Salazar, an American citizen employed by the U.S. Drug Enforcement Agency, by "prolonging [his] life so that others could further torture and interrogate him."

On April 2, 1990, Álvarez was abducted from Mexico by Trent Tompkins, a U.S. citizen hired by DEA agents, and brought to trial in the United States over the protest of Mexican officials.

Legal action reached the Supreme Court, focusing upon the effect of illegal extradition upon the trial court's jurisdiction. Invoking the "Ker–Frisbie doctrine" the Court held that the trial court's jurisdiction was not affected by the manner in which the accused was brought before it. This created international alarm and concern as other nations feared that the decision would encourage further such abductions.

== Aftermath ==
Despite vigorous protests from the Mexican government, Álvarez was tried in United States District Court in Los Angeles; the trial, in which his defense focused intensely on the legality of the arrest, resulted in an acquittal. The trial judge (whose earlier decision dismissing the indictment had been overruled by the Supreme Court) ruled at the close of the government's case in chief that the government had not presented a prima facie case, and therefore granted an acquittal without presenting the matter to the jury for verdict. The other suspect, Javier Vasquez Velasco, was arrested for his alleged involvement in the murder, convicted, and sentenced to three life sentences.

== See also ==
- List of United States Supreme Court cases, volume 504
- List of United States Supreme Court cases
- Lists of United States Supreme Court cases by volume
- List of United States Supreme Court cases by the Rehnquist Court
