= Lali González =

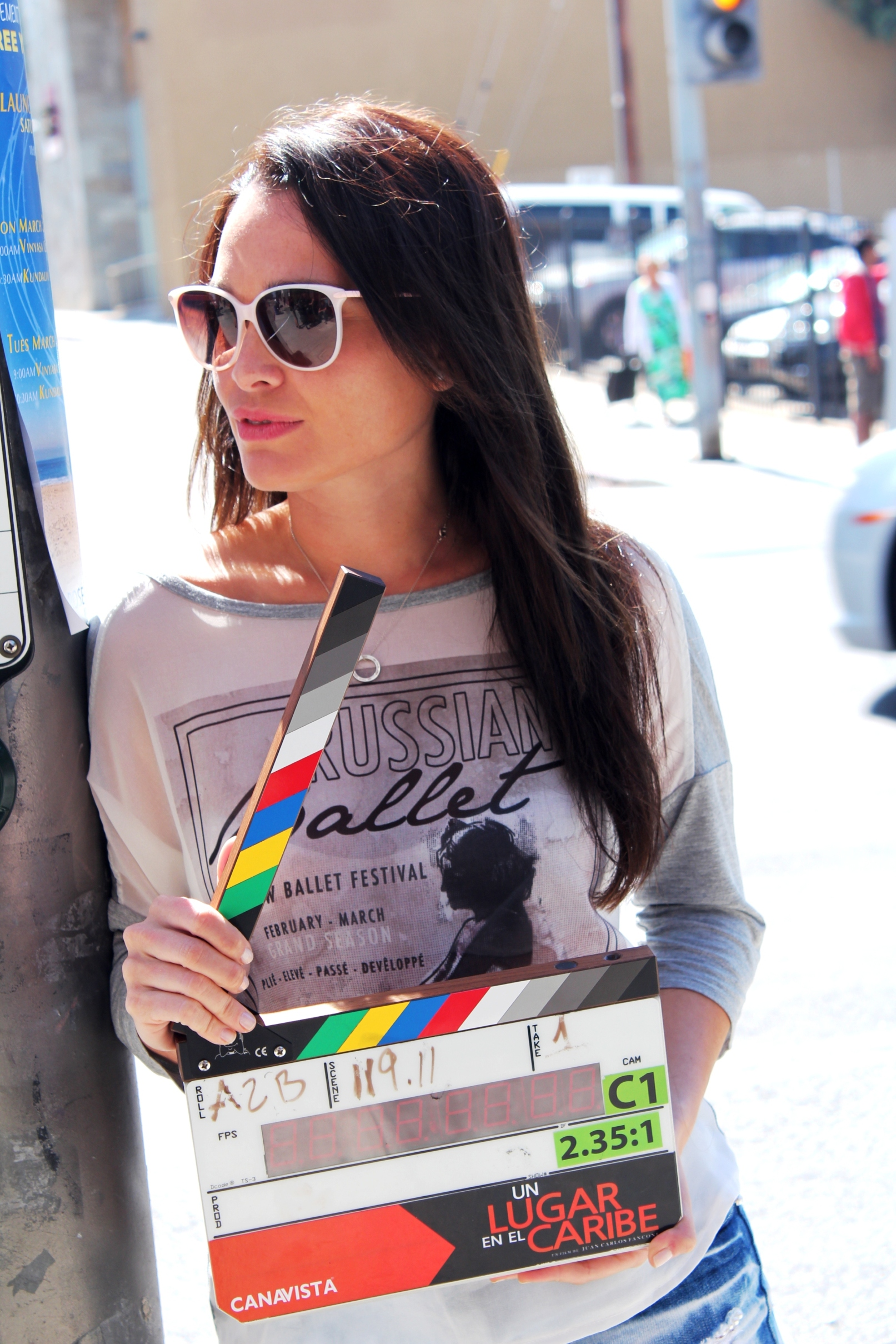
- González in 2015
- Born: Graciela Belén González Mendoza; December 27, 1986 (age 39); Asunción, Paraguay
- Education: Universidad Católica Nuestra Señora de la Asunción
- Occupation: Actress
- Years active: 2007–present
- Spouse: Walter Riveros (m. 2016)
- Children: 1
- Website: www.laligonzalez.com

Graciela Belén González Mendoza (born December 27, 1986), professionally known as Lali González is a Paraguayan theatre, television and film actress. Her breakout film role was playing Liz in the multiawarded Paraguayan film 7 Boxes.

Lali is known for her performances in films from Paraguay, Argentina, Colombia and Honduras. She is among the first Paraguayan actresses playing a co-leading role in a foreign accent to her native accent, in the Argentinian film El jugador, which made her become the first Paraguayan actress to be featured on the streaming platform Netflix.

In April 2022, it was announced that Lali was nominated for the Martín Fierro awards in the category of leading actress in fiction, for her role in the Argentine telenovela La 1-5/18 from El Trece network.

== Early life ==
Lali was trained essentially as a stage actress. She graduated from the theatre school El Estudio in 2010. She also holds a law degree from the Universidad Católica Nuestra Señora de la Asunción.

== Career ==
=== Television ===
Her first appearance on screen was in 2010, as she played the main role in the second chapter of the television series La Herencia de Caín, directed by Paraguayan film and theatre director Agustín Núñez.

=== Films ===
Lali began appearing in movies in 2010. She played Liz in the Paraguayan film 7 Boxes, a film nominated to the 27th Edition of the Goya Awards, in the category "Best Foreign Film in Spanish", featured in more than 25 international film festivals and released in numerous different countries.

Since 2012, Lali has not stopped working in the film industry. In that year, she played Irma in the Paraguayan-Argentinian movie Lectura según Justino, directed by Arnaldo André, and shared cast alongside well-known Argentinian actors Julieta Cardinali and Mike Amigorena.

She appeared in Latin American films after being cast to work in Argentina, Colombia, Brazil and Honduras. In 2013 she worked with the Argentinian director Daniel Gagliano in the movie El hijo buscado, along with renowned actor Rafael Ferro. In November of the same year she was part of the Colombian film Revenge strategy by director Carlos Varela.

In 2014, she was invited to be part of the cast of the Paraguayan film Luna de cigarras, directed by Jorge Díaz de Bedoya. Lali also performed in Mangoré, a Paraguayan film directed by Chilean Luis Vera, along with famous Mexican actor Damián Alcázar.

In October 2014, Lali represented Paraguay in the jury for the category "Fiction Feature Film" of the First Film Festival of the Three Borders in Misiones, Argentina.

In 2015, she was cast for the Honduran film A Place in the Caribbean, by director Juan Carlos Fanconi. She starred along with Gastón Pauls, Gabriela de la Garza, José Zúñiga and Rodrigo Guirao Díaz.

Her work includes the Argentinian film El jugador (2016), casting along Pablo Rago and Alejandro Awada. With this movie, Lali became the first Paraguayan actress to appear in the popular streaming platform Netflix, in July 2018. She also starred in the Paraguayan film La Redención (2018), directed by Herib Godoy. This "road movie" combines the story with war scenes from the Chaco War, and Lali plays Marlene, a young woman driving her grandfather around, in a journey to discover his memories from the war battles.

Lali can also be seen in the 2018 Argentinian-Paraguayan movie Gracias Gauchito by Argentinian director Cristian Jure, and the Argentinian movie Los que vuelven, directed by Laura Casabé.

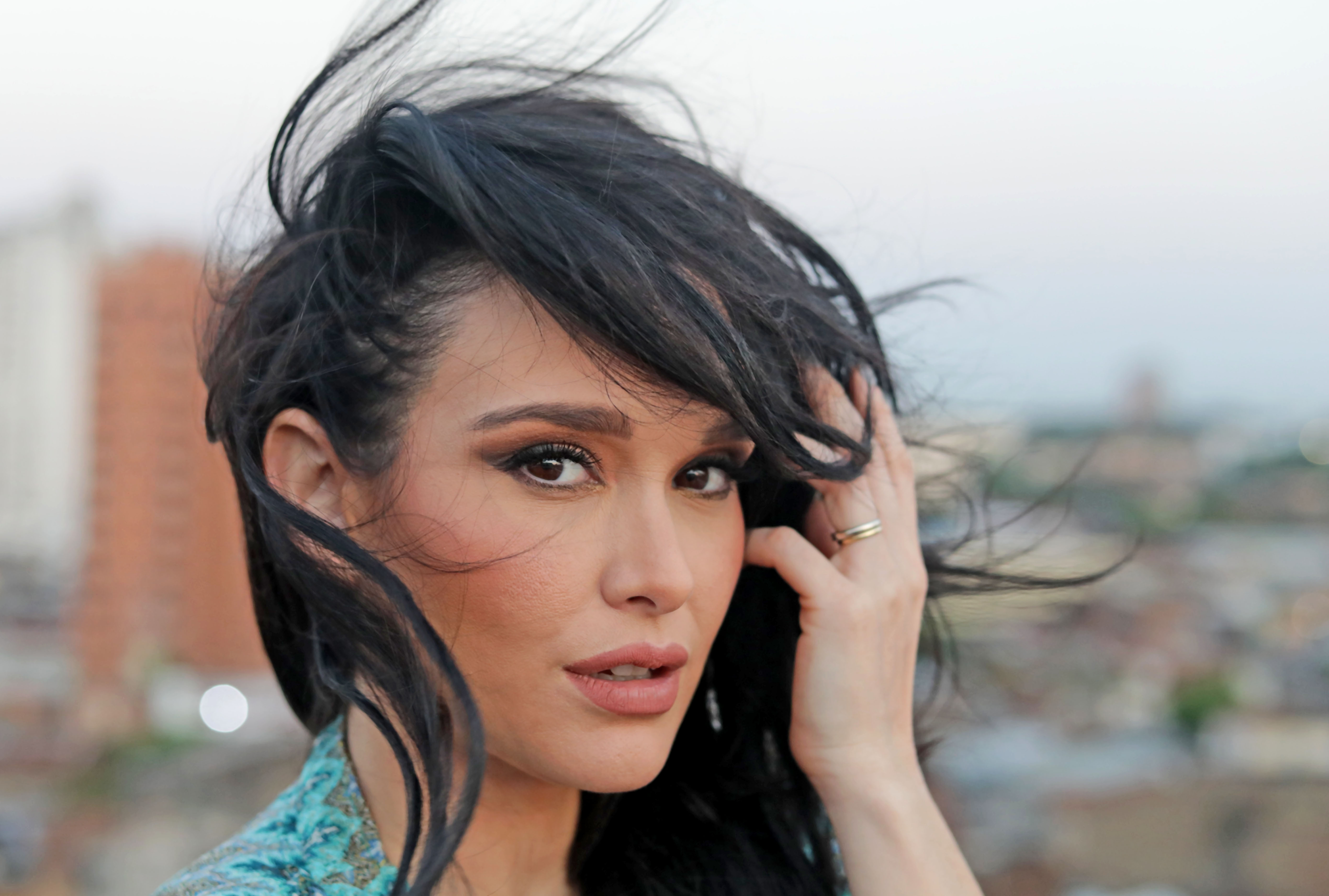
Lali González in 2018.

=== Theatre ===
In theatre, Lali stands as an actress and also as a producer of successful plays, such as Recién casados (2013), Rostros sagrados (2013–14 and 2016) and Veridicas (2017). The latter is a play based on internet videos made for her YouTube channel. Lali also was in the Paraguayan cast of the international play Toc Toc, premiered in Paraguay in 2014.

== Personal life ==
In 2016 Lali married Paraguayan music producer Walter Riveros. In 2019 she gave birth to the couple's first child, Rafaela.

== Filmography ==
Year	Title	Country	Role	Director	Notes
2012	7 Boxes	Paraguay	Liz	Juan Carlos Maneglia and Tana Schémbori	Nominated Goya Awards
2013	Lectura según Justino	Paraguay/Argentina	Irma	Arnaldo André	Nominated Platino Awards
2013	El hijo buscado	Argentina	Cristina	Daniel Gagliano	
2014	Luna de cigarras	Paraguay	Mabel	Jorge Diaz de Bedoya	
2015	Mangoré	Paraguay	Isabel	Luis R. Vera	
2016	Revenge strategy	Colombia	La Pequeña La	Carlos Varela	
2016	El jugador	Argentina	Paulina	Dan Gueller	Available on Netflix for Latin America
2017	Un lugar en el Caribe	Honduras	Sofía	Juan Carlos Fanconi	
2018	La redención	Paraguay	Marlene	Herib Godoy	
2018	Gracias Gauchito	Argentina/Paraguay	Dolores	Cristian Jure	
2018	Los que vuelven	Argentina	Kerana	Laura Casabé	
2020	Charlotte	Paraguay	Ana	Simon Franco	
2020	Pedro Juan 2 Caballeros	Paraguay		Robert Rodriguez	To be released
2023	The Last Runway 2, Commando Yaguarete	Paraguay	Graciela Agüero	Armando Aquino & Mauricio Rial	

== Television ==
Year	Title	Country	Role	Network
2016	Escape perfecto	Paraguay	Co-host	Telefuturo
2017	Mucho gusto	Paraguay	Host	Trece
2021-2022	La 1-5/18	Argentina	Rita	Canal 13
2022	Rojo Paraguay	Paraguay	Judge	Telefuturo
2023	¿De qué signo sos?	Argentina	Host	Canal 13
2023	Bailando	Argentina	Participant	América

== Theatre ==
Year	Play
2007-2008	Justo Balbuena juez
2008	Entre los infinitos puntos de un segmento
2009	Ladrillos
2010	La llaga
2011	El solterón
2011	La parada
2012	La única rubia soy yo
2013	La joda es bella
2013	Rostros sagrados
2013	Recién casados
2014	Rostros sagrados, festival de maldad
2014	Toc Toc
2015	Las viudas
2016	Miss rostros sagrados
2017	Veridicas
2019	Pase lo que pase
2023	Las cosas maravillosas

== Other work ==
Year	Title	Role	Notes
2010	Hoy no puedo, tengo un entierro	Secondary role	Short film by Agustín Núñez
2010	La herencia de Caín	Main role	TV series directed by Agustín Núñez
2014	Talento de Barrio, El concierto	Director assistant	Live concert DVD
2018	Si tu quieres	Writer and director	Videoclip of Paraguayan pop singer Acho Laterza

== Standup comedy ==
Year	Title
2018	Primeriza
2020	Una mami en cuarentena
2021	She's Lali

== Mentions ==
Year	Organisation	Reasoning
2022	Heroes Awards	Civil hero: Outstanding female role model in Argentina
2022	Parana Awards	Honourable mention: Artistic career
2022	Congress of Paraguay	Honourable mention by the Upper House

== Awards and nominations ==
Award	Year	Category	Nominated work	Result	Ref.
Edda Awards	2021	Mejor Show de Stand Up Virtual	She's Lali	Won	
Martín Fierro Awards	2022	Best Actress in a Leading Role	La 1-5/18	Nominated	
