= La encrucijada =

La encrucijada may refer to:

- The Crossroads (1952 film) (La encrucijada), an Argentine film
- The Crossroads (1959 film) (La encrucijada), a French-Spanish film
- La encrucijada (TV series), a Spanish television series
- La Encrucijada Biosphere Reserve, Mexico
- La Encrucijada, Venezuela transport hub, Venezuela

== See also ==
- The Crossroads (disambiguation)
