= Drug Wars: The Camarena Story =

1990 American TV miniseries

- DVD cover
- Genre: Biographical drama; Crime drama
- Based on: Desperados by Elaine Shannon
- Directed by: Brian Gibson
- Starring: Steven Bauer; Miguel Ferrer; Benicio del Toro; Treat Williams; Craig T. Nelson; Raymond J. Barry
- Music by: Charles Bernstein; Charles Calello; Strunz & Farah; Al Kooper; Warren Zevon
- Country of origin: United States
- Original language: English
- No. of episodes: 3

Production
- Executive producer: Michael Mann
- Producer: Branko Lustig
- Production location: Spain
- Cinematography: Sandi Sissel
- Editors: Kevin Krasny; Skip Schoolnik
- Running time: 240 minutes
- Production companies: World International Network; ZZY Productions

Original release
- Network: NBC
- Release: January 7 – January 9, 1990

Drug Wars: The Camarena Story is a 1990 American crime drama television miniseries based on the life of Enrique "Kiki" Camarena, an undercover DEA agent who was abducted and killed by the Guadalajara Cartel in 1985. The series is directed by Brian Gibson and stars Steven Bauer in the titular role and Benicio del Toro as cartel leader Rafael Caro Quintero, alongside Elizabeth Peña, Miguel Ferrer, Treat Williams and Craig T. Nelson. It is based on Elaine Shannon's 1988 non-fiction book Desperados. Filmmaker Michael Mann served as an executive producer, as well as co-writing one of the episodes.

The series originally aired in three installments on NBC, from January 7–9, 1990. It was the second most watched NBC miniseries of the year following The Kennedys, and was generally well-received by critics. It won Outstanding Miniseries at the 42nd Primetime Emmy Awards, and Steven Bauer was nominated for a Golden Globe Award for Best Actor – Miniseries or Television Film. A follow-up television film, Drug Wars: The Cocaine Cartel, aired in 1992.

== Plot ==
Fact-based story of undercover Drug Enforcement Administration agent Enrique "Kiki" Camarena who, while stationed in Guadalajara, uncovered a massive marijuana operation in Northern Mexico that led to his death and a remarkable investigation of corruption within the Mexican government.

== Cast ==
- Steven Bauer as Enrique "Kiki" Camarena
- Elizabeth Peña as Mika Camarena
- Miguel Ferrer as Tony Riva
- Benicio del Toro as Rafael Caro Quintero
- Treat Williams as Ray Carson
- Craig T. Nelson as Harley Steinmetz (based on former DEA agent James Kuykendall)
- Guy Boyd as George Gilliard
- Tony Plana as Pavan Reyes
- Tomas Milian as Florentino Ventura
- Raymond J. Barry as Jack Lawn
- Everett McGill as Bob Rawlings
- Eddie Velez as Ramon Varona
- J. Kenneth Campbell as Stephen Matson
- Andy Romano as Bud Mullen
- Jorge Cervera Jr. as Suarez
- Valentin de Vargas as Valdez
- Kenny Morrison as Enrique Camarena Jr.
- Gary Armagnac as Don Clements
- Rosalind Chao as Thanh Steinmetz
- Aharon Ipalé as Attorney General Ramirez
- Daniel Zacapa as Abel Reynoso
- Simón Andreu as Portago Diaz
- Danny Trejo as Gabriel
- Tony Fields as Cesar
- Tito Larriva as Himself

== Episodes ==
No.	Title	Directed by	Written by	Original release date	US viewers (millions)
1	"Part 1"	Brian Gibson	Rose Schacht & Ann Powell	January 7, 1990	N/A
2	"Part 2"	Brian Gibson	Mel Frohman	January 8, 1990	N/A
3	"Part 3"	Brian Gibson	Story by : Christopher Canaan and Michael Mann; Teleplay by : Christopher Canaan and Rose Schacht & Ann Powell	January 9, 1990	N/A

== Production ==
Concerns over the series' subject matter discouraged shooting on-location in Mexico, so filming took place mainly in Spain. Craig T. Nelson's portrayal is based on retired DEA Resident Agent in Mexico, James "Jamie" Kuykendall, a markedly antithetical depiction if compared to Amazon Prime's docuseries, The Last Narc (approximately thirty years later).

== Reception ==
In his review for The New York Times, John J. O'Connor wrote, "Perhaps not surprisingly, these amoral entrepreneurs provide some of the film's juicier roles. Especially effective is Benicio del Toro as the young, illiterate and flaky Rafael Caro-Quintero". In his review for USA Today, Matt Roush wrote, "For a Michael Mann production, there's surprisingly little flash to Drug Wars. Some interesting camera work to be sure, including the video bits and some heightened use of slow motion, but the miniseries' chief strength is its grit, its anger". Craig MacInnis, in his review for the Toronto Star, wrote, "Interspersed with U.S. network news footage of the real Camarena incident in '85, the dramatic scenes in Drug Wars are never anything less than convincing - just as good propaganda should be".

=== Awards and nominations ===
At the 42nd Primetime Emmy Awards, the series won the award for Outstanding Miniseries, and was nominated for Outstanding Sound Editing for a Limited or Anthology Series, Movie or Special.

Steven Bauer was nominated for Best Actor – Miniseries or Television Film at the 48th Golden Globe Awards.

== Home media ==
All three parts originally ran for four hours. The DVD release features a heavily edited version that runs only 130 minutes.

== Connections to other media ==
At least four of the principal actors in Drug Wars: The Camarena Story later starred in the Academy Award-winning film Traffic, a film that also deals with the subject of the ongoing drug trade between the United States and Mexico. In a somewhat interesting reversal of roles, in Drug Wars actors Miguel Ferrer and Steven Bauer both play DEA agents while Benicio del Toro and Eddie Velez play drug traffickers; in Traffic, Ferrer and Bauer both play drug traffickers, while del Toro and Velez play a Mexican federal narcotics agent and a DEA agent.
