= Rockwood Elementary School =

Rockwood Elementary School may refer to:

- Rockwood Elementary School of the Calexico Unified School District, in Calexico, California
- Rockwood Elementary School of the Oklahoma City School District, in Oklahoma City, Oklahoma
- Rockwood Area Elementary School of the Rockwood Area School District, in Rockwood, Pennsylvania
- Rockwood Elementary School of Maine Department of Education, in Rockwood Township, Somerset County, Maine
