= Javier Juárez =

Javier Juárez may refer to:

- Javier Juárez Camacho (born 1968), Spanish journalist, cited in Caridad Mercader
- Javier Juárez Crespo (born 1969), Spanish basketball player, head coach of Real Madrid Baloncesto B
- Javier Juárez Vázquez (died 1984), murdered Mexican journalist
