= Juan Matta-Ballesteros =

Honduran drug lord (1945–2025)

Juan Ramón Matta-Ballesteros
- Born: January 12, 1945; Tegucigalpa, Honduras
- Died: October 30, 2025 (aged 80); MCFP Springfield, Springfield, Missouri, U.S.
- Other name: El Señor
- Occupations: Drug lord Matta Organization, Medellín Cartel associate
- Spouse: Nancy de Matta
- Children: Claudia Matta, Juan Ramón Matta, and Maria Matta
- Criminal charges: Drug trafficking, murder, kidnapping
- Penalty: Life imprisonment

Juan Ramón Matta-Ballesteros (also spelled Mata-Ballesteros; January 12, 1945 – October 30, 2025) was a Honduran major narcotics trafficker who has been credited with being one of the first to connect Mexican drug traffickers with the Colombian cocaine cartels. This connection paved the way for a major increase in the amount of cocaine smuggled into the United States during the late 1970s and throughout the 1980s. Matta was indicted for operating several major cocaine smuggling rings in United States in the early 1980s. He was also one of the narcotics traffickers accused of the kidnap and murder of American DEA agent Enrique Camarena in 1985.

In 1988, Matta was arrested at his Honduran residence in a controversial operation by the Honduran and US. government and taken to the United States, where he stood several trials for his drug smuggling activities and his part in the kidnap and murder of Enrique Camarena. He was found guilty of drug smuggling, and of participating in the kidnapping, but not the murder, of Camarena. In 2017, his conviction in the Camarena kidnapping was overturned because of the flawed forensic evidence used in his trial. A new trial was ordered, but in 2018 prosecutors decided to drop the charges.

Matta served a life sentence for his drug sentence at the United States Penitentiary, Canaan, a high-security federal prison in Pennsylvania. As of February 2021, he was serving his sentence at the US Medical Center for Prisoners in Springfield, Missouri. He since died in prison.

== Early life ==
Details of Matta's early life remain unclear. According to a family-run website, he was born in Tegucigalpa as the second of four children. A number of newspaper sources claim that Matta immigrated illegally to the United States as a teenager and was deported several times, returning each time under a different name. In 1970, he was convicted of entering the country on a false passport and confined at the Federal prison camp in Eglin, Florida. He escaped from the camp the following year. In 1974, Mexican authorities arrested Matta for selling 10 kilograms of cocaine. He spent a year in prison, and was suspected of killing two other prisoners while incarcerated.

== 1980s U.S. drug smuggling operations and indictments ==
In the early 1980s, Matta was involved with major cocaine smuggling operations. In 1984, he was indicted for his role in a Van Nuys smuggling ring. The discovery of the ring in 1981 resulted in the seizure of 114 pounds of cocaine and $1.9 million in cash, and, based on ledgers found with the drugs, prosecutors later estimated that the ring had generated $73 million in just nine months. In 1985, Matta was again indicted for his role in a major cocaine smuggling ring operating in Arizona and southern California. The ring was discovered in 1984, resulting in the seizure of about a ton of cocaine and $7.8 million in cash.

== Involvement in Camarena kidnap-murder ==
Soon after the February 1985 kidnap-murder of U.S. DEA agent Enrique Camarena, Matta was suspected of involvement, and he was later indicted for his part in the kidnapping. According to journalist Elaine Shannon, Matta was actually located in Mexico City several days after Camarena's kidnapping, but his arrest was delayed by Mexican authorities, and he managed to flee the country. U.S. law enforcement continued to track Matta, and in April 1985, they traced him to the Colombian city of Cartagena. At the DEA's request, Matta was arrested by the Colombian government. In March 1986, while extradition proceedings were still underway, Matta escaped from prison, according to some accounts by bribing prison authorities. Later that year, Matta returned to his native country of Honduras.

== Arrest and removal to U.S. ==
The Honduran Constitution prohibited the extradition of Honduran citizens, and for two years Honduran authorities rejected U.S. requests to extradite Matta. Finally, in April 1988, Honduran police arrested Matta and put him on a plane to the Dominican Republic. The Dominican government then put him on a flight to Puerto Rico with United States Marshals, who arrested Matta when they reached United States territory. The day after Matta's extradition, 1,000 to 2,000 students from the National Autonomous University in Tegucigalpa marched on the U.S. embassy to protest. During the protests, which lasted for two days, the embassy was set on fire, and five students were killed.

== Conviction and incarceration ==
Matta appealed his conviction several times. Finally, in 1995, the U.S. Court of Appeals for the Ninth Circuit found that the United States Supreme Court, in a 1992 ruling on another defendant in the same case, had upheld the prosecution of a fugitive who was brought to the United States by kidnapping rather than extradition.

Matta also appealed on the grounds that he was beaten and burned with an electric stun gun while being transported to the United States. A Federal judge in Los Angeles had previously found the evidence for his claims inconclusive, and the Court of Appeals declined to overturn that ruling.

== Matta's role in the Guadalajara cartel ==
Several writers have claimed that Matta played an important role in the formation of the Guadalajara cartel, brokering some of the earliest deals between Colombian cocaine suppliers and Mexico-based smugglers, and starting Mexican smugglers in the business of transporting Colombian cocaine into the U.S. By 1975, Matta had formed an alliance with the Mexican drug lord Miguel Ángel Félix Gallardo("El Padrino"), and with them the Guadalajara Cartel began to take shape.

By the late 1980s, Matta had become extremely wealthy and employed thousands of people in the businesses he owned. Matta also possessed investments in coffee, tobacco, spice, cattle, and dairy operations and founded several agricultural and construction firms in Honduras. A U.S. court of appeals estimated that Matta and Felix Gallardo were pulling in more than $5 million per week from their drug trafficking activity alone, and these businesses helped Matta launder much of these illicit earnings. In 1982, DEA agents reported that Matta had paid $50 million to Bolivian and other Latin American officials to protect his narcotics operations from law enforcement harassment.

== Matta-Ballesteros and the Contras ==
Matta-Ballesteros was the owner of SETCO, an airline which the Nicaraguan Contras used to covertly transport military supplies and personnel in the early 1980s. Writers such as Peter Dale Scott and Jonathan Marshall have suggested that the U.S. government's desire to conceal or protect these clandestine shipments led it to close the DEA office in Honduras when an investigation began into SETCO, allowing Matta-Ballesteros to continue and expand his trafficking.

== Dismissal of Camarena kidnapping charges ==
Matta-Ballesteros was originally charged with participating in the kidnapping, but not the murder, of DEA agent Enrique Camarena. The first basis for this charge was testimony from Hector Cervantes Santos, who was in charge of security for a cartel attorney. Cervantes testified that Matta was present when the Camarena kidnapping was discussed at the attorney's house. The second basis was testimony from FBI forensics specialist Michael Malone that hair and fiber evidence tied Matta to the house where Camarena was held.

Cervantes Santos later recanted and re-recanted his testimony several times. Based on this Matta filed for a new trial, but a hearing in 1998 found that Cervantes' recantations were not reliable. In 2014, however, the Department of Justice Inspector General determined that Malone's forensic methods were also not reliable. Matta filed for a new trial again, and in 2017 Judge John Kronstadt vacated Matta's convictions on the kidnapping charges, ordering a new trial. In December 2018, the prosecution announced that it would drop the kidnapping charges (Matta was already serving a life sentence without parole for drug smuggling).

== Death ==
Matta-Ballesteros died on October 30, 2025, at the age of 80.

== In popular culture ==
Vladimir Cruz played Matta-Ballesteros in season one of the American television series Narcos: Mexico.
