= Miguel Aldana Ibarra =

Mexican director of Interpol (1940–2021)

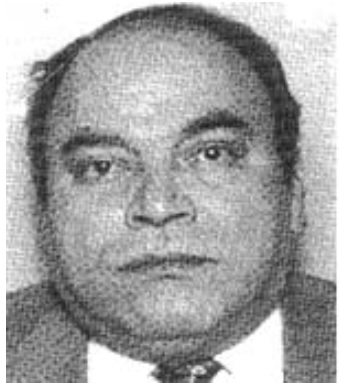
Miguel Aldana Ibarra (DEA headshot).

Miguel Aldana Ibarra (1940 – 17 October 2021) was a Mexican police and former director of Interpol in Mexico who was indicted in the United States for the killing of DEA agent Enrique Camarena.

Aldana died on 17 October 2021 of a heart attack. At the time of his death, he was wanted by the DEA.
