= Calexico Unified School District =

School district in California, United States

Address
- 901 Andrade Avenue Calexico, California, 92231; United States

District information
- Type: Public
- Grades: K–12
- NCES District ID: 0606900

Students and staff
- Students: 8,353
- Teachers: 380.83
- Staff: 522.42
- Student–teacher ratio: 23.20

Other information
- Website: www.cusdk12.org

Calexico Unified School District is a school district in California. It has its headquarters in Calexico.

== Schools ==
Adult center:

- Roberto F. Morales Adult Center

High schools:

- Calexico High School (zoned)
- De Anza 9th Grade Academy (zoned) (migrated with Calexico High School)
- Aurora High School (alternative)
- Calexico Community Day School (alternative)

Junior high schools:

- Enrique Camarena Junior High School
- William Moreno Junior High School

Primary schools:

- Blanche Charles Elementary School
- Cesar Chavez Elementary School
- Dool Elementary School
- Jefferson Elementary School
- Kennedy Gardens Elementary School
- Mains Elementary School
- Rockwood Elementary School
