= Fran Villalba (composer) =

Paraguayan-Italian composer (born 1978)

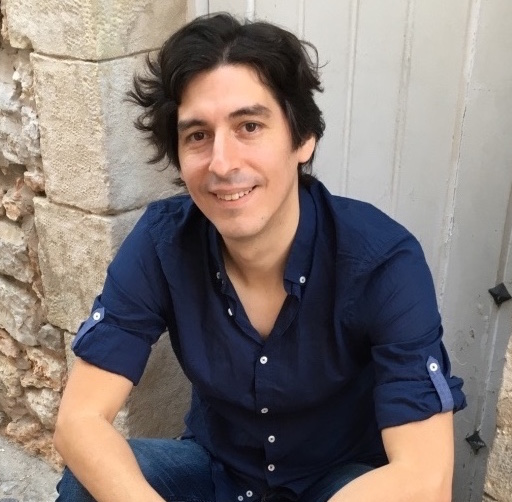

Background information
- Born: Carlos Francisco Villalba Greco; 7 November 1978 (age 47); Asunción, Paraguay
- Origin: Paraguay Italy
- Genres: Film scores, soundtracks, instrumental
- Occupations: Film composer, music producer and executive producer
- Instruments: Piano, keyboard, synthesizer, guitar and accordion
- Years active: 1996–present
- Website: http://www.franvillalba.com

Fran Villalba is a Paraguayan-Italian composer, music producer and executive producer. He has composed scores for many short films and featured films. He is best known as the composer of the award-winning Paraguayan film 7 Boxes (2012).

== Education and career ==
He holds a degree in accounting from Universidad Católica "Nuestra Señora de la Asunción".

He has a classical music education (Piano Professor, Accésit and Professor of Music Theory), self-taught studies in harmony, composition and electronic music. He holds a master's degree in Composition of Soundtracks and Music for Audiovisual Media from the Escola Superior de Música de Catalunya and a master´s degree in Executive Production for Films and Series from the Escuela de Cinematografía y del Audiovisual de la Comunidad de Madrid. He has been recently selected to participate in the Berlinale Talents 2024.

He was keyboardist of the rock band Gaudí (1996–2010), with whom he recorded 3 albums "Radio Fábula" (1996), "Turbo" (1999), and "La Vida es Más" (2010).

Fran won a scholarship to attend the Laboratory of Music for Film in 2013, which belongs to film laboratories for professionals in Mexico City (Mexico). He was selected for Talents Buenos Aires (Argentina) in 2014.

He released his first album of instrumental music Universo Paralelo in 2014.

He is known for his work on "7 Boxes" (2012) award-winning for Film in Progress at the International Film Festival of San Sebastian and nominated for Goya Awards, "#Ya" (2015) World Premiere at the 65th Berlinale - Generation 14 Plus Competition, "Peaches" (2017) named as The Raindance Film of the Festival Award, "Selva" (2017) nominee for La Semaine de la Critique - Cannes competition, "3 feet" (2019) winner of the Special City Award at the Kineko International Children's Film Festival, and "Cazando Gamusinos" (2019) winner of The Children Jury Special Mention at the Tbilisi International Animation Festival.

He is a member of the European Film Academy and the Paraguayan Film Academy.

Fran has been working as a composer and music producer on his own Planetario Music Studio since 2006.

== Discography ==
- Universo Paralelo (2014)

== Filmography ==
- Opaco (2006)
- Minotauro (2008)
- Jazmines del Alma: La vida de Chiquitunga (2009)
- Universo servilleta (2010)
- 7 cajas (2012)
- #Ya (2015)
- Km 72 (2015)
- De lunes a lunes (2016)
- Liviano (2016)
- Selva (2016)
- Un Bosque (2017)
- Hoy partido a las 3 (2017)
- Río atrevido (TV Mini-Series 2017)
- Mujeres entre fronteras (TV Mini-Series 2017)
- Mr. Emmett & Los Melocotones enlatados (2017)
- México 1984 (2017)
- Venus Flytrap (2017)
- The Muse (2017)
- Hycha Guaia (2018)
- Tercer Acto (2018)
- 3 feet (2018)
- Cazando Gamusinos (2018)
- A casa (2019)
- Santa Clara (2019)
- Divine Woman (2020)
- Yacaa (2020)

== Other work (additional music) ==
- Die Toten reiten schnell (2015)

== Awards ==
- Rock and Pop Paraguay Awards 2000 – Best Paraguayan keyboardist (winner).
- 45 Talents of the year 2013 El País Awards – One of the 45 talents of the year by the Spanish newspaper (winner).
- Unasur International Film Festival Awards 2013 (Argentina) – Best Sound design/Original Music award for the score of "7 Boxes" (winner).
- Tatakua Festival 2017 (Paraguay) - Best Original Soundtrack award for the advertisement "Moving fans" for Laika Agency (winner).
- Experimental Film, Dance & Music Festival 2017 (Canada) - Best Music award for "A Forest" (winner).
- SciFi Film Festival (Australia) 2018 - Best Music/Sound award for the score of "Melocotones" (winner).
- US Hollywood International Golden Film Award (USA) 2019 - Excellence-Music for the score of "Cazando Gamusinos" (nominee).
- Indie Film Awards (Japan) 2020 - Best Music for the score of "Cazando Gamusinos" (nominee).
- National Competition of Artistic Creation for the 150 years of the Guasu War (Paraguay) 2020 - Second prize "Campamento Cerro León" of Musical Creation (winner).
