= Lu Alone =

Brazilian singer and songwriter

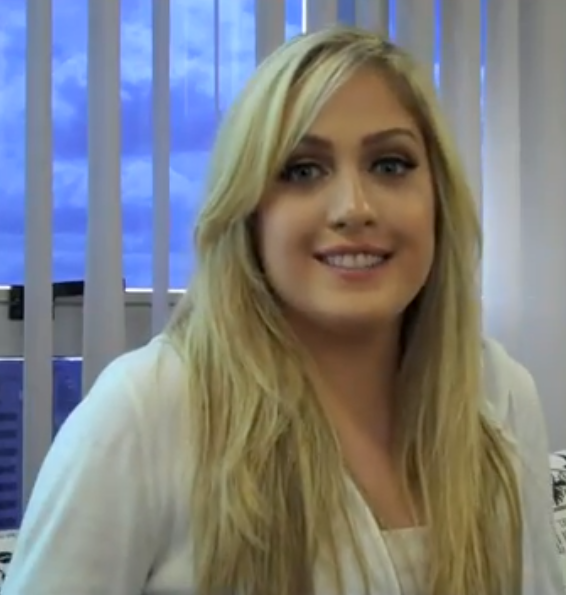
- In a 2011 video

Background information
- Born: 28 February 1993 (age 33); Belo Horizonte, Minas Gerais, Brazil
- Genres: Contemporary Christian music, pop rock
- Occupations: Singer, songwriter
- Instruments: Vocals, guitar, piano
- Years active: 2009–present
- Label: Som Livre
- Formerly of: Diante do Trono
- Website: lualone.com.br

Luciana Alone Pereira (born 28 February 1993) is a Brazilian singer and songwriter. Her career began in gospel music with Diante do Trono. In 2010, she released her first album, Lu Alone. In 2011, she appeared in the American film Destiny Road.

== Biography ==
A daughter of Branca and Ian Alone, the four-year-old was invited to sing in Lagoinha Church's infanto juvenil choir, where Lu Alone participated in Diante do Trono recordings.

The family initially released her music independently on through YouTube and MySpace. Through Musificando—a MySpace music competition—she met British producer Stuart Epps, who invited her to record an album in England, but she declined at the direction of her father. When she was recording a demo CD, she was introduced to a Som Livre representative. Lu Alone was recorded in 2010 with producer Rubens di Souza and was released on 9 March. An eponymous reality show began airing on Multishow in May. The program followed the singer, from recording through the album's release. Also in May, she opened the Demi Lovato concert in São Paulo, at Via Funchal. The single "Not The Right Day" had about 600,000 downloads in Brazil. She appeared in the 2011 American film Destiny Road, where she plays Lucy, Elizabeth's (Zoe Myers) best friend. She recorded an album in Rio de Janeiro which was released in 2012 that included Portuguese-language songs. The first single, "Tudo Pra Mim", released on 1 September 2011. Five days later, she appeared with the five finalists including Ivete Sangalo and Paula Fernandes, on Multishow Award, but lost. Her appearance resulted in #LuAlone entering Twitter's global trends topics, from São Paulo and Rio de Janeiro.

In 2012, she participated in Lagoinha Church's Confrajovem, where she said she is back to the gospel, leaving the secular music to devote to the Christian community. Lu is part of the evangelical movement Escolhi Esperar. In September 2013, she enrolled in Christ for the Nations Institute (CFNI) in Dallas. On Valentine's Day, Lu Alone released a special single called "À Moda Antiga".

During June and July 2014, she was invited to participate in Diante do Trono's European tour. In August she participated as a choir member during Diante do Trono's recording of Deus Reina in partnership with Gateway Worship. In April 2015, she sang during stylist Patrícia Motta's fashion show.

In 2020, she debuted in Quando o Sol Se Põe (When the Sun Goes Down). It is the first Brazilian Christian film to appear on Netflix.

== Filmography ==
Films
Year	Title	Role	Notes
2012	Destiny Road	Jenny	Television film
2017	Quando o Sol se Põe	Olívia	Television film

Television shows and appearances
Year	Title	Role	Notes
2001	Crianças Diante do Trono	Herself	Crianças Diante do Trono's series
2003	Crianças Diante do Trono: Amigo de Deus	Herself	Crianças Diante do Trono's series
2009	Crianças Diante do Trono: Para Adorar ao Senhor	Herself	Crianças Diante do Trono's series
2010	Lu Alone - Reality Show	Herself / Presenter	Multishow series

== Discography ==
=== Albums ===
Year	Album details	Peak positions	
Year	Album details	BRA Hot 30	BRA ABPD
2010	Lu Alone: Released: March 9, 2010; Label: Som Livre	23	10
2012	Amor Acima de Tudo: Released: 2012; Label: Universal Music	26	13

=== Singles ===
List of singles as lead artist, with selected chart positions, showing year released and album name
Title	Year	Peak chart positions	Album
Title	Year	BRA	Album
Postcard	2010	34	Lu Alone
"Not the Right Day"	2010	10	Lu Alone
"Baby Where Are You"	2010	12	Lu Alone
"Tudo Pra Mim"	2011	10	Amor Acima De Tudo
"Eu e Você"	2011	29	Amor Acima De Tudo
"À Moda Antiga"	2014	—	non-album single

=== Other songs ===
List of singles as lead artist, with selected chart positions, showing year released and album name
Title	Year	Peak chart positions	Album
Title	Year	BRA	Album
"I'm Not a Little Girl"	2010	35	Lu Alone
