= The Last Narc (TV series) =

American television documentary series

The Last Narc is a docuseries about the 1985 death of U.S. DEA agent Enrique "Kiki" Camarena. The series interviews DEA agents and witnesses to Camarena's death who state that he was murdered by Mexican drug lords, with the complicity of the CIA. The series was released by Amazon Prime Video in July 31, 2020.

== Synopsis ==
The docuseries recounts the story of DEA Agent Kiki Camarena's investigation of Mexican cartel drug lords including Miguel Angel Felix Gallardo, Ernesto Fonseca Carrillo and Rafael Caro Quintero, his death at the hands of drug lords and the CIA, and the DEA relations that followed Camarena's death. It counts among other with the testimonies of former DEA agent Héctor Berellez that led the investigation of Camarena's murder in Operation Leyenda; Phil Jordan, former DEA Intelligence Director; Mike Holm, DEA resident agent in charge in Guadalajara when Camarena got kidnapped; and Manny Medrano, former assistant US Attorney and Lead Prosecutor in Camarena case.

In the telling of Camarena's wife and former DEA agents Phil Jordan and Mike Holm, Camarena cost the cartels billions of dollars when his investigations led the Mexican Army to burn down Rancho Búfalo, a major marijuana plantation. Camarena earned further enemies by discovering that the CIA was working with the cartels to fund anti-communist Contras in Nicaragua. The docuseries interviews the DEA agent who spearheaded the investigation of Camarena's death. The agent, Hector Berrellez, states that the CIA agent Félix Ismael Rodríguez helped torture Camerena to learn what Camarena knew about US government connections to Mexican cartels. According to Berrellez, Camarena was killed because he was going to disclose these connections. Also interviewed are employees and enforcers of the cartels who helped capture and torture Camarena, but later became witnesses for the DEA.

The docuseries shoots footage in the home where Camarena was tortured and murdered, now an elementary school. During interviews with Camarena's wife, she states that she believes neither the US nor Mexican governments told her the whole truth about her husband's death. The CIA has denied any involvement in Camarena's death.

The series features interviews with real persons involved in Camarena's life and death.

== Production ==
The documentary's director, Tiller Russell, researched Camarena's murder for 14 years, and then shot and edited The Last Narc for two years. Russell has kept his location a secret, fearing for his safety. He said that after he asked Jorge Godoy one interview question, Godoy drew a pistol.

The Last Narc was produced by Eli Holzman and Aaron Saidman.

== Reception ==
The Daily Beast reviewed The Last Narc favorably, calling it a "a wide-ranging expose about the entangled relationship between the CIA, the Mexican government, the DFS (Mexico’s secret police, created by the CIA) and the cartels."

According to the Florida-based CE Noticias Financieras, The Last Narc "is notable" for approaching the story of Camarena's death beyond the ordinary patriotic narratives of the US and Mexican governments. The newspaper writes that The Last Narc makes a convincing argument about Camarena's death: "In a blunt way, this work by Amazon also establishes something that has been ventilated before: the Sinaloa Cartel was a creation of the PRI regime through the DFS and the DFS, in turn, was a creation of the CIA."

David Hathaway, a DEA agent who worked in South America alongside Phil Jordan and Mike Holm, endorsed the series.

== Lawsuit ==
On December 21, 2020 James Kuykendall, former chief of a DEA field office in Mexico, sued Amazon and the makers of the documentary, alleging that it depicted him as complicit in the murder of Kiki Camarena. Amazon briefly removed the series from view, but later restored it. After the defendants filed a motion to compel Kuykendall to comply with the discovery process, Kuykendall voluntarily dismissed the lawsuit (with prejudice).

== See also ==
- American Conspiracy: The Octopus Murders
- CIA involvement in Contra cocaine trafficking
- CIA drug trafficking, Torture and murder of Kiki Camarena
- Assassination of Javier Juárez Vázquez (reporter)
