= Kiki Camarena =

DEA agent murdered by drug traffickers (1947–1985)

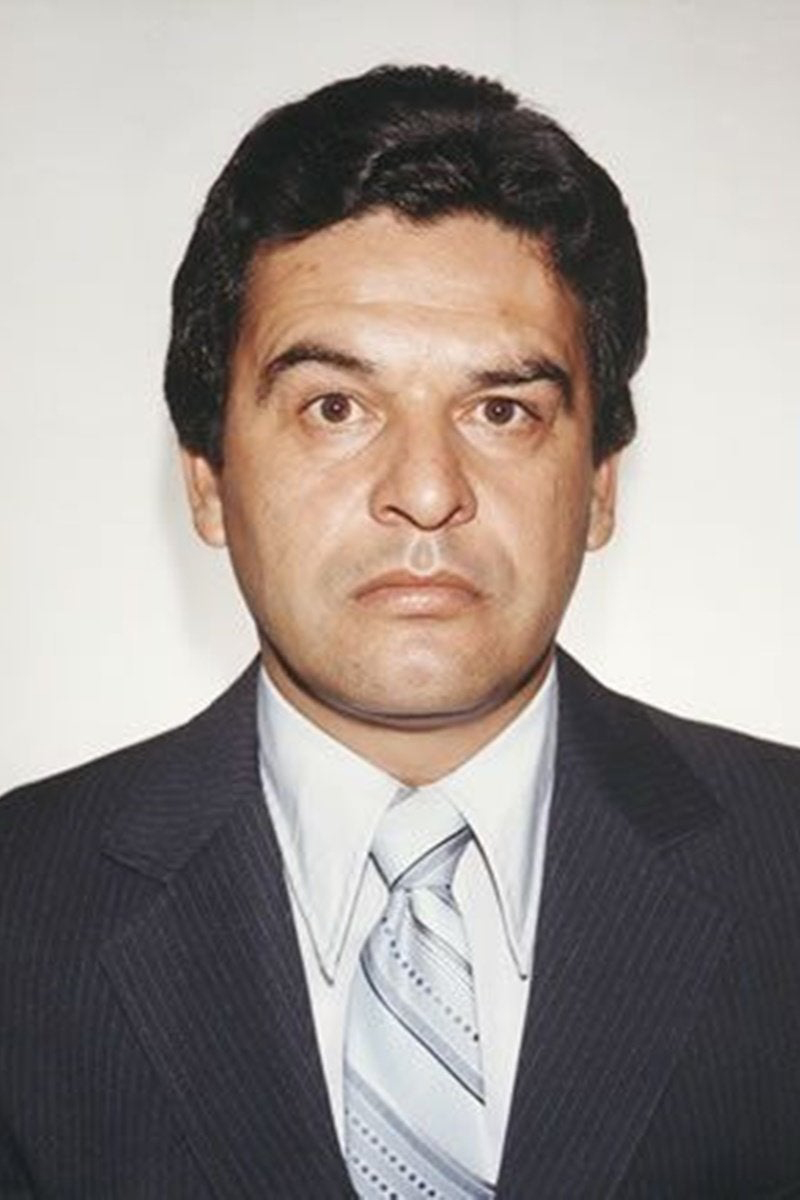
- Born: Enrique Camarena Salazar; July 26, 1947; Mexicali, Baja California, Mexico
- Died: February 9, 1985 (aged 37); Guadalajara, Jalisco, Mexico
- Cause of death: Assassination (torture and blunt force trauma to the head)
- Other name: Kiki (Note: Also spelled Quique or Kiké (Spanish))
- Education: Calexico High School
- Spouse: Mika Camarena
- Police career
- Department: Calexico Police Department; Drug Enforcement Administration
- Service years: 1970–1985
- Military service
- Allegiance: United States
- Branch: United States Marine Corps
- Service years: 1968–1970
- Rank: Lance corporal

Enrique Camarena Salazar (July 26, 1947 – February 9, 1985) was a Mexican-American agent of the Drug Enforcement Administration (DEA). In February 1985, Camarena was kidnapped by police officers hired by the Guadalajara Cartel. After being tortured for information, Camarena was eventually killed. The U.S. investigation into Camarena's murder led to ten trials in Los Angeles for Mexican nationals involved in the crime. The case continues to trouble U.S.–Mexican relations, most recently when Rafael Caro Quintero, one of the three convicted traffickers, was released from a Mexican prison in 2013. Caro Quintero was again captured by Mexican forces in July 2022, reigniting discussions surrounding Camarena’s murder and its impact on enforcing drug policies domestically and abroad.

Several journalists, historians, former DEA and CIA officers, and Mexican police officers have written that the Central Intelligence Agency (CIA) was complicit in Camarena's murder because Camarena discovered CIA involvement in drug trafficking operations in Mexico, which were used to fund the Contras in Nicaragua. The CIA has denied the allegations.

== Early life and career ==
Enrique Camarena was born on July 26, 1947, in the border city of Mexicali, Mexico. The family—three brothers and three sisters—immigrated to Calexico, California, when Camarena was a child. Camarena's parents divorced when he was young, and the family endured considerable poverty after their move. His oldest brother, PFC Eduardo Camarena-Salazar, died of malaria while serving with the U.S. Army's 173rd Airborne Brigade in Vietnam in September 1965. His other brother Ernesto had a troubled police record, including drug problems. Despite the family's difficulties, Camarena graduated from Calexico High School in 1966.

After graduating from high school, Camarena joined the Marines in 1968. Following his discharge in 1970, he returned to Calexico and joined the police department. He moved on to undercover narcotics work as a Special Agent on the Imperial County Narcotic Task Force (ICNTF). After the Drug Enforcement Administration (DEA) was established in 1973, it quickly instituted a hiring program for Spanish-speaking agents. Both Camarena and his sister Myrna joined the agency in 1973, Myrna as a secretary and Enrique as a special agent in the DEA's Calexico resident office.

In 1977, Camarena transferred to the agency's field office in Fresno, where he worked undercover on smuggling activities in the San Joaquin Valley. Author Elaine Shannon describes Camarena as "a natural in the theater of the street", able to "slip effortlessly into a Puerto Rican accent or toss off Mexican gutter slang—whatever the role demanded." Colleagues described him as driven, even by the standards of job-focused DEA agents.

In 1980, a colleague and close friend who had moved from Fresno to the DEA resident office in Guadalajara suggested that Camarena also apply for an assignment at the office, where a position was open. Foreign assignments were important for job advancement in the DEA and the Guadalajara office was seeing a surge in work, foreshadowing the explosion in drug trafficking of the 1980s. By this time, Camarena was married and had three sons. Guadalajara's spring-like weather, the city's American school, and the favorable exchange rate convinced Camarena and his family that the move would be good for the family.

== Mexican background ==
American anti-narcotic efforts in Mexico long predate the Camarena case. Mexican heroin and marijuana production became a concern to U.S. drug enforcement by the 1960s, but the first major American joint actions with the Mexican government did not begin until the 1970s with Mexico's own "Operation Condor".

America’s involvement in Mexico’s drug trade in the 1970s and 1980s was a contributing factor to a contentious relationship with Mexico and the development of Mexican cartels. The war on drugs initiative implemented under the Reagan Presidency put considerable pressure on Mexico to cooperate with the U.S. to combat the growing power of the Guadalajara and Sinaloa cartels, which leveraged their power through the use of corruption and violence to control the drug trade. Despite joint anti-drug initiatives such as eradication programs and intelligence-sharing, the drug trade continued due to mutual mistrust, institutional corruption, and the demand for narcotics within the U.S. Ultimately, the U.S. and Mexico’s relations continue to be strained, with the drug trade still persisting.

=== Early anti-narcotic efforts in Mexico ===
When the French heroin connection was shut down in the early 1970s, Mexico took its place as an important source of American heroin. Mexican marijuana production boomed in the early 1970s as well, and was later a major component of the Guadalajara cartel's production and trafficking. At this time in the early 1970s, Mexico was not yet a major transshipment point for cocaine, primarily produced in the Andean countries of Colombia, Peru, and Bolivia.

In response to strong American pressure and domestic law enforcement concerns, Mexico began eradication programs of opium and marijuana plantations, with large infusions of U.S. assistance. The first programs were on a smaller scale and used mostly manual eradication, such as "Operation Cooperation" in 1970. As plantation sizes grew, the eradication efforts also grew. In 1975, Mexican president Luis Echeverría approved Operation Trizo, which used aerial surveillance and spraying of herbicides and defoliants from a fleet of dozens of planes and helicopters.

The spraying programs required extensive American involvement, both for funding and operations. DEA pilots performed important operational roles; in addition to training Mexican pilots, they helped spot fields for spraying and verified that spraying runs had destroyed targeted fields. As part of the program, DEA was allowed to fly in Mexican airspace freely.

These flights produced positive results, reducing acreage planted and eventually a reduction in Mexican heroin quality and quantity. Mexican law enforcement on the ground also had some positive results. Alberto Sicilia Falcon, a major trafficker who was one of the first to transship cocaine through Mexico, was arrested in 1975. Pedro Avilés Pérez, an important Sinaloa trafficker was killed in a shoot-out with Mexican Federal Police in 1978.

=== DEA personnel abroad ===
As part of these efforts, the first American narcotics law enforcement office was opened in Mexico City in the mid-1960s by the Federal Bureau of Narcotics, a branch of the Treasury Department. A Guadalajara office was opened in 1969. These and other offices opened by various agencies remained in place as American drug enforcement agencies proliferated and merged into the DEA. While the offices were opened with permission from the Mexican government, they later became controversial, particularly during the Camarena case.

DEA agents stationed in Mexico and other countries then and now are subject to several restrictions by the host country. They have no law enforcement powers; instead, they perform intelligence, liaison, and advisory functions, collect and pass along information on drug trafficking, and advise on local anti-narcotics programs. In Mexico, although there had been an informal agreement with the Mexican federal government that agents could carry personal weapons, it was illegal for foreigners to do so, and local officials were free to arrest them for this. DEA agents accredited to the U.S. Embassy in Mexico City had full diplomatic status, but agents in the resident offices did not and could be arrested and imprisoned without any official protections.

American law also restricts DEA activities abroad. Due to host country restrictions, DEA policy prohibits agents from doing undercover work abroad. A law known as the Mansfield amendment, introduced by Senator Mike Mansfield and passed by Congress in 1975, prohibited DEA personnel to be present at the scene of an arrest outside the U.S. It also banned agents from using force, except where lives were threatened. This later complicated DEA efforts in the investigation of Camarena's death.

== Camarena in Guadalajara ==
By the time Camarena took up his post in Guadalajara in the summer of 1980, drug trafficking in Mexico was on the rise. There were several reasons for this. Under Mexican president José López Portillo, the aerial spotting and eradication endorsed by President Echeverría were curtailed, and American participation in these activities ended in 1978. This made it easier for producers to build the large plantations discovered later in the 1980s and more challenging to verify that areas identified had actually been sprayed. During the late 1970s and early 1980s, cocaine trafficking, driven mostly by Colombian smugglers, grew rapidly in the United States and became a primary target of the DEA, leaving Mexican enforcement a secondary concern. During Camarena's 4 1/2 years in Guadalajara, major traffickers arose to take the place of the figures arrested and killed in the 1970s. The best-known of these were Miguel Ángel Félix Gallardo, Ernesto Fonseca Carrillo and Rafael Caro Quintero. These three often coordinated their production and operations and formed the core of what came to be called the Guadalajara Cartel. All three were found guilty of having participated in Camarena's kidnap and murder.

=== Resident agent ===
Camarena's investigations often focused on the large marijuana plantations that emerged in the early 1980s. These earlier plantations were typically set in isolated mountain regions, making them difficult to detect. Although they did not need well drilling for irrigation, yields were modest, product quality fluctuated, and transportation costs were high.

The new plantations used an improved production technique for marijuana, developed by American cultivators, called "sinsemilla" (seedless). This more powerful, higher-quality product brought much higher prices in North American markets. The plantations were located in remote desert areas, where transportation was cheaper.

The new plantations faced several problems. Desert production required well drilling for irrigation, and Mexico had strict laws governing well digging, a problem that was eventually solved by massive bribery. It was also easier to spot plantations in the barren deserts; the larger the farm, the easier to spot. With an end to solo American overflights as part of the eradication program, however, money and intimidation allowed farms to grow dramatically without coming to official notice.

Prohibited from solo overflights and undercover work, DEA agents in Mexico concentrated on cultivating informants, an often difficult task, especially as informing became more and more dangerous. Camarena, however, excelled at working with informants; Shannon writes that "Nobody else in the Guadalajara office could match Kiki's charisma with informants. He had a way of convincing a man to screw up his courage and venture where he never dreamed he would go."

Camarena's work with an informant they called "Miguel Sanchez" led to the first discovery of one of the new style plantations in 1982. "Sanchez" became friends with the man running the plantation, who told "Miguel" it was outside the small, isolated town of Vanegas in the state of San Luis Potosí, just across the border from the state of Zacatecas. According to "Miguel"'s information, the main financier of the plantation was cartel member Juan José Esparragoza Moreno. Camarena and "Miguel" finally located the plantation in August 1982. Camarena arranged two surreptitious solo overflights to confirm that it was a major plantation. He then briefed Mexican authorities, who raided the plantation in September. Astonishingly, the plantation was over 200 acres, employing hundreds of growers. The Guadalajara DEA estimated over 4,000 tons of sinsemilla marijuana were destroyed in the raid, making it the largest plantation discovered up to that time.

== Abduction and murder ==
In 1984, acting on information from the DEA, 450 Mexican soldiers backed by helicopters destroyed a 1,000-hectare (2,500-acre) marijuana plantation in Allende, Chihuahua, known as Rancho Búfalo, with an estimated annual production of $8 billion. Camarena, who was suspected of being the source of the information, was abducted in broad daylight on February 7, 1985, by corrupt Mexican officials working for the major drug traffickers in Mexico. Later that same day, a Mexican pilot named Alfredo Zavala Avelar (who flew missions with Camarena and was a DEA asset) was also abducted.

Camarena was taken to a residence at 881 Lope de Vega in the Colonia of Jardines del Bosque, in the western section of the city of Guadalajara, owned by Rafael Caro Quintero, where he was tortured over a 30-hour period and then murdered. His skull was punctured by a piece of rebar, and his ribs were broken. Camarena's and Avelar's bodies were found wrapped in plastic in a rural area outside the small town of La Angostura in the state of Michoacán on March 5, 1985. His body was cremated and his ashes spread over Mt. Signal near Calexico.

=== Investigation ===
Camarena's torture and murder prompted a swift reaction from the U.S. Drug Enforcement Administration (DEA) and launched Operation Leyenda (legend), the largest DEA homicide investigation ever undertaken. A special unit was dispatched to coordinate the investigation in Mexico, where government officials were implicated—including Manuel Ibarra Herrera, past director of Mexican Federal Judicial Police, and Miguel Aldana Ibarra, the former director of Interpol in Mexico.

Investigators soon identified Miguel Ángel Félix Gallardo and his two close associates, Ernesto Fonseca Carrillo and Rafael Caro Quintero, as the primary suspects in the kidnapping and under pressure from the U.S. government, Mexican president Miguel de la Madrid quickly apprehended Carrillo and Quintero, but Félix Gallardo still enjoyed political protection and wasn't arrested until four years later in 1989.

The United States government pursued a lengthy investigation of Camarena's murder. Due to the difficulty of extraditing Mexican citizens, the DEA went as far as to use bounty hunters to capture Humberto Álvarez Machaín, the physician who allegedly prolonged Camarena's life so the torture could continue, and Javier Vásquez Velasco, and bring them to the United States.

Despite vigorous protests from the Mexican government, Álvarez was brought to trial in Los Angeles in 1992. After the government presented its case, the judge ruled that there was insufficient evidence to support a guilty verdict and ordered Álvarez's release. Álvarez subsequently initiated a civil suit against the U.S. government, charging that his arrest had breached the U.S.–Mexico extradition treaty. The case eventually reached the U.S. Supreme Court, which ruled that Álvarez was not entitled to relief. The four other defendants, Vásquez Velasco, Juan Ramón Matta-Ballesteros, Juan José Bernabé Ramírez, and Rubén Zuno Arce (a brother-in-law of former president Luis Echeverría), were tried and found guilty of Camarena's kidnapping.

Zuno had known ties to corrupt Mexican officials, and Mexican officials were implicated in covering up the murder. Mexican police had destroyed evidence on Camarena's body.

=== Allegations of CIA involvement ===
A number of former DEA agents, CIA agents, Mexican police officers, and historians have written that the CIA was complicit in Camarena's death. Between 2013 and 2015, the Mexican newspaper Proceso, journalist Jesús Esquivel, journalists Charles Bowden and Molly Malloy, and historians Russell and Silvia Bartley published investigative reports and books making the same allegation. They write that Camarena, like Mexican journalist Manuel Buendía, discovered that the CIA helped organize drug trafficking from Mexico into the United States in order to fund the anti-communist Contras in Nicaragua as a part of the Cold War. Historian Wil Pansters explained that US victory in the Cold War was more important to the CIA than the DEA's war on drugs:

Since the overriding concern of the CIA was the anti-Sandinista project, it trumped the DEA's task of combating drug trafficking, and covertly incorporated (or pressured) parts of the Mexican state into subservience. Buendía had found out about the CIA-contra-drugs-DFS connection, which seriously questioned Mexican sovereignty, while Camarena learned that the CIA had infiltrated the DEA and sabotaged its work so as to interfere with the clandestine contra-DFS-traffickers network. They knew too much and were eliminated on the orders of the U.S. with Mexican complicity. Later official investigations attempted to limit criminal responsibility to the dirty connections between drug traffickers, secret agents and corrupt police, leaving out the (geo)political ramifications.

In 2019, the United States Department of Justice began reinvestigating Camarena's murder, and in 2020 Amazon Studios released a documentary, The Last Narc, supporting the allegations and implicating Félix Rodríguez. The CIA has said the allegations are untrue. In a blog post, Camarena biographer Elaine Shannon described the allegations as a "Deep State conspiracy theory," and interviewed former DEA agent Jack Lawn, who agreed with her. Historian Benjamin T. Smith called the DEA's official story of Camarena's death "mythmaking as murder inquiry," providing the DEA with "a story" and "money." Smith noted that multiple investigators implicated the CIA in Camarena's death, and wrote that one source for the allegations regarding CIA involvement, Lawrence Victor Harrison, had a plausible story. Smith added however that the allegations have "big holes." Smith concluded that CIA involvement in Camarena's death is plausible but uncertain, adding that the CIA likely used traffickers to ship guns and cocaine in Mexico, as it did, according to him, in Central and South America, Afghanistan, and Southeast Asia.

The notion of CIA involvement in Camarena's murder has received wide currency in Latin America.

=== Extradition to the United States ===
On February 27, 2025, Caro Quintero was transferred from Mexican custody to the United States alongside 28 other alleged drug cartel figures. The mass prisoner transfer was executed by the administration of Mexican President Claudia Sheinbaum in response to intense economic pressure from U.S. President Donald Trump, who had threatened to impose a blanket 25% tariff on all Mexican imports unless the country dramatically escalated its enforcement actions against drug cartels.

The White House released a statement confirming that the operation was directly ordered by Trump and carried out via coordinated efforts between the U.S. Department of Justice under Attorney General Pamela Bondi and the Department of State under Secretary Marco Rubio. Legal analysts noted that the fast-tracked transfer bypassed traditional, lengthy extradition appeals, functioning instead as a security expulsion to avert the impending trade penalties. Following his arrival on American soil, Caro Quintero was held to face multiple federal charges across various U.S. jurisdictions, including the 1985 murder of DEA Special Agent Enrique "Kiki" Camarena.

== Legacy ==
=== Awards and honors ===
In November 1988, Time magazine featured Camarena on the cover. Camarena received numerous awards while with the DEA, and he posthumously received the Administrator's Award of Honor, the highest award given by the organization. In Fresno, the California Narcotic Officers' Association (CNOA) hosts a yearly memorial golf tournament named after him and presents an annual scholarship to graduating high school seniors. A school, a library and a street in his home town of Calexico, California, are named after him. Enrique Camarena Junior High School of the Calexico Unified School District opened in 2006. Additionally, Enrique Camarena Elementary School in Mission, Texas of the La Joya Independent School District, is named after him and had its dedication ceremony in 2006. The nationwide annual Red Ribbon Week, which teaches school children and youths to avoid drug use, was established in his memory.

=== Memorial efforts ===
In 2004, the Enrique S. Camarena Foundation was established in Camarena's memory. Camarena's wife, Mika, and son, Enrique Jr., serve on the all-volunteer board of directors together with former DEA agents, law enforcement personnel, family and friends of the Camarena's, and others who share their commitment to alcohol, tobacco, and other drug and violence prevention. As part of its ongoing Drug Awareness program, the Benevolent and Protective Order of Elks awards an annual Enrique Camarena Award at local, state and national levels to a member of law enforcement who carries out anti-drug work.

In 2004, the Calexico Police Department erected a memorial dedicated to Camarena. The memorial is in the halls of the department where Camarena served.

Several books have been written on the subject. Camarena is the subject of the book ¿O Plata o Plomo? The abduction and murder of DEA Agent Enrique Camarena (2005) by retired DEA Resident Agent in Charge James H. Kuykendall. Roberto Saviano's non-fiction book Zero Zero Zero (2015) deals in part with Camarena's undercover work and his eventual fate.

== Personal life ==
Camarena and his wife Mika had three sons: Enrique, Erik, and Daniel.

== Media depictions ==
Drug Wars: The Camarena Story (1990) is an American television miniseries about Camarena.

"Heroes Under Fire: Righteous Vendetta (2005)" is a documentary that explores the related events and includes interviews with family members, DEA agents, and others linked to the investigation.

In the drama Narcos, news footage recaps Camarena's death and its aftermath in the first-season episode "The Men of Always." The first season of the spin-off series Narcos: Mexico is dedicated to the Camarena story, from his arrival in Mexico to his career there and eventual murder. Camarena is depicted by Michael Peña.

Miss Bala (2011) is a Mexican film that portrays a fictionalized version of Camarena's murder.

The Last Narc, released in 2020 on Amazon Prime Video is a miniseries that depicts the kidnapping of Camarena and the events leading to it. On December 21, 2020, retired DEA agent James Kuykendall filed a lawsuit over the show's claims that he was involved in Camarena's murder. Kuykendall filed for voluntary dismissal in May 2022 and the court dismissed the lawsuit with prejudice.

== See also ==
- Jaime Zapata
- Javier Barba-Hernández
- Mexican drug war
- List of kidnappings
- List of solved missing person cases: 1950–1999
- United States v. Alvarez-Machain
- Michele Leonhart
- List of Mexicans

== Bibliography ==
- Shannon, Elaine (1988). Desperados: Latin drug lords, U.S. lawmen, and the war America can't win. New York: Viking. ISBN 978-0-670-81026-0.
- Kuykendall, James (2005). O Plata o Plomo? Silver or Lead?. Xlibris. ISBN 978-1-59926-002-0.
- Andreas Lowenfeld, "Mexico and the United States, an Undiplomatic Murder", in Economist, March 30, 1985.
- Andreas Lowenfeld, "Kidnapping by Government Order: A Follow-Up", in American Journal of International Law 84 (July 1990): 712–716.
- U.S. House of Representatives, Committee on the Judiciary, Drug Enforcement Administration Reauthorization for Fiscal Year 1986: Hearing Before the Subcommittee on Crime. May 1, 1985 (1986).
