= Amarres =

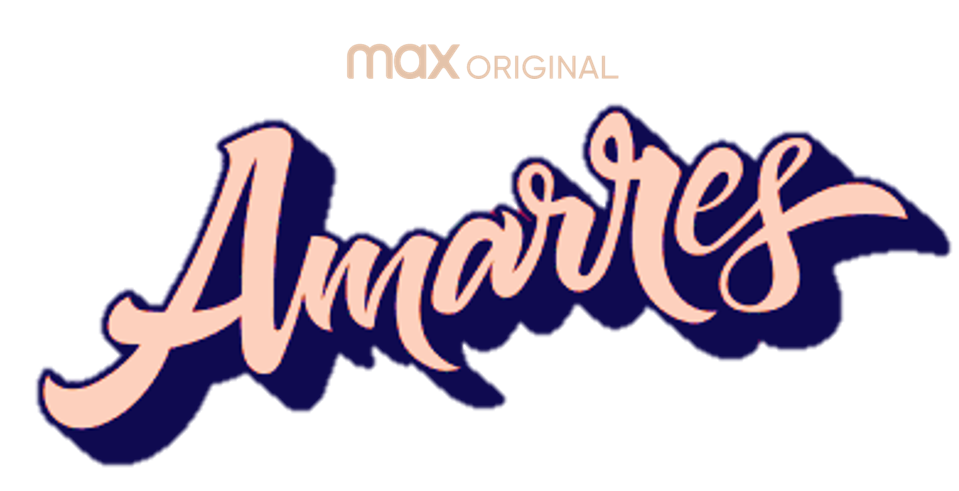
- Genre: Comedy drama
- Created by: Fernanda Eguiarte
- Story by: Amaya Muruzábal
- Directed by: Marcelo Tobar
- Starring: Gabriela de la Garza; Hugo Catalán; Juan Pablo Medina
- Composers: Mauricio "Gonzo" Arroyo; Luis "Luca" Ortega
- Country of origin: Mexico
- Original language: Spanish
- No. of seasons: 1
- No. of episodes: 10

Production
- Executive producers: July Sierra; Fernanda Eguiarte; Fidela Navarro; Amaya Muruzábal; Luisa Díaz
- Production location: Mexico City
- Cinematography: Jerónimo Goded; Santiago Barreiro
- Editor: Ana García
- Camera setup: Multi-camera
- Running time: 45 minutes
- Production companies: Warner Bros. Discovery Americas; Turner Broadcasting System Latin America; Dopamine

Original release
- Network: HBO Max; TNT Latin America
- Release: 12 August 2021

Amarres is a Spanish-language comedy-drama television series created by Fernanda Eguiarte and directed by Marcelo Tobar that premiered on HBO Max on 12 August 2021. The series, produced by Warner Bros. Discovery Americas, Dopamine and Turner Broadcasting System Latin America, is considered the first Latin American program made for HBO Max (under the banner Max Originals) to be released after the arrival of HBO Max in Latin America on 29 June 2021. It was also scheduled to be released in the second quarter of 2020 on TNT Latin America. It stars Gabriela de la Garza, Hugo Catalán, and Juan Pablo Medina. The series consists of 10 episodes of 45 minutes.

== Cast ==
=== Main cast ===
- Gabriela de la Garza as Ana
- Hugo Catalán as Ricardo
- Juan Pablo Medina as Roger
- Martín Saracho as Armando
- Alicia Jaziz as María
- Mauricio Isaac
- Nicole de Albornoz as Olga

=== Recurring and guest cast ===
- Regina Flores Ribot
- Pablo Astiazarán
- Rafael Simón
- María Elena Olivares
- Nailea Norvind as Roberta
- Ricardo Reynaud
- Eligio Meléndez
- Jordy Ulloa
- Rocío de la Mañana
- Rubén Zamora
- Viviana Serna
- Irán Castillo
- Benny Emmanuel
- Verónica Toussaint

== Episodes ==
No. overall	No. in season	Title	Directed by	Written by	Original release date
1	1	"Amarrada"	Marcelo Tobar de Albornoz	Fernanda Eguiarte	12 August 2021
2	2	"La trastienda"	Marcelo Tobar de Albornoz	Fernanda Eguiarte	12 August 2021
3	3	"Belcebú"	Marcelo Tobar de Albornoz	Fernanda Eguiarte	12 August 2021
4	4	"¿Y si jugamos botella?"	Marcelo Tobar de Albornoz	Fernanda Eguiarte	12 August 2021
5	5	"Milf"	Marcelo Tobar de Albornoz	Fernanda Eguiarte	12 August 2021
6	6	"Agua bendita"	Marcelo Tobar de Albornoz	Fernanda Eguiarte	12 August 2021
7	7	"Una espía"	Marcelo Tobar de Albornoz	Fernanda Eguiarte	12 August 2021
8	8	"Los novios de mamá"	Marcelo Tobar de Albornoz	Fernanda Eguiarte	12 August 2021
9	9	"El perdón del estafador"	Marcelo Tobar de Albornoz	Fernanda Eguiarte	12 August 2021
10	10	"La dalia roja"	Marcelo Tobar de Albornoz	Fernanda Eguiarte	12 August 2021
