= Ruben Niebla =

American baseball coach (born 1971)

San Diego Padres – No. 57
- Pitching coach
- Born: December 19, 1971 (age 54); Calexico, California, U.S.
- Bats: Left Throws: Left
- Stats at Baseball Reference

Teams
- As coach: Cleveland Indians (2012, 2020–2021); San Diego Padres (2022–present)

Ruben O. Niebla (born December 19, 1971), is an American former professional baseball pitcher and current pitching coach for the San Diego Padres of Major League Baseball (MLB). He formerly served as the assistant pitching coach for the Cleveland Indians.

== Career ==
Niebla attended Calexico High School in Calexico, California, and Azusa Pacific University.

A pitcher, Niebla played in minor league baseball from 1995 to 2000 with teams in the Montreal Expos and Los Angeles Dodgers organizations and in independent baseball leagues. Niebla was with the Cleveland Indians Organization since 2001, as a coach at multiple levels of the organization. In 2010, he was a Major League Coaching Assistant for the Indians. On August 9, 2012, the Cleveland Indians fired pitching coach Scott Radinsky and named Niebla the interim pitching coach for the remainder of the 2012 season. Niebla served as the Indians minor league Pitching Coordinator from 2013 through the 2019 season. Niebla was named the Indians' assistant pitching coach on October 31, 2019.

Niebla was hired as the San Diego Padres pitching coach on October 27, 2021.
