= Daniel Zacapa =

American actor (born 1951)

- Born: July 19, 1951 (age 75); Tegucigalpa, Honduras
- Occupation: Actor

Daniel Zacapa (born July 19, 1951) is a Honduran-American movie actor. Zacapa played the role of Detective Taylor in the 1995 David Fincher film Seven. He has worked steadily since, amassing a number of television credits and a role in Up Close and Personal.

== Early life ==
Zacapa was born in Tegucigalpa in 1951. He moved to the United States to pursue an acting career in Los Angeles.

== Career ==
Zacapa played Tio Ruben of the Santiago family in Showtime's Resurrection Blvd., Renda in George Clooney's directorial debut Confessions of a Dangerous Mind, and a leading role in the independent film Coronado. Television appearances have included Six Feet Under, Judging Amy, The Practice, NYPD Blue, Seinfeld, Star Trek: Deep Space Nine', Star Trek: Voyager, The Mentalist and a guest appearance on Criminal Minds. After that, he began to get involved in Honduran film productions like A Place in the Caribbean.

== Personal life ==
Zacapa lives in Shady Cove, Oregon.

== Filmography ==
=== Film ===
Year	Title	Role	Notes
1979	Boulevard Nights	Ernie	
1988	Tequila Sunrise	Arturo	
1993	The Sandlot	Police Chief	
1993	The Painted Desert	Luigi	
1995	Seven	Detective Taylor	
1996	Up Close & Personal	Harvey Harris	
1996	Phenomenon	Father at Book Fair	
1997	Black Dawn	Luis Flores	
1997	The Bad Pack	Hector Chavez	
1997	After the Game	Detective Garcia	
1998	The Odd Couple II	Lead Cop	
2000	The Egg Plant Lady	Peter Vecino	
2001	The Mexican	Mexican Bartender	
2002	Confessions of a Dangerous Mind	Renda	
2003	First Watch	Col. Hawkins	
2003	Coronado	Sancho	
2006	Fallen Angels	Hendricks	
2007	The Gene Generation	Randall	
2008	Ball Don't Lie	Paco	
2008	San Saba	Detective Morales	
2008	Adventures in Appletown	Judge Ramos	
2009	The Things We Carry	Leslie	
2011	Valley of the Sun	Convenience Store Clerk	
2012	The Voices from Beyond	Mario	
2012	Destiny Road	Frank	
2013	Our Boys	Salvador	
2014	Frontera	Abuelo	
2014	Search Party	Roberto	
2014	The Zwickys	Don Manuel	
2015	Before the Border	Michael	
2016	True Memoirs of an International Assassin	Detective Diego Garcia	
2016	Masterminds	Raydel Quintero	
2017	A Place in the Caribbean	Marcelo	
2017	Same Kind of Different as Me	Julio	

=== Television ===
Year	Title	Role	Notes
1978	The Bionic Woman	Raul	Episode: "All for One"
1978	Lou Grant	David	Episode: "Physical"
1979	Detective School	Munk	Episode: "The Runaway"
1981	The White Shadow	Reporter	Episode: "Mister Hero"
1981	Archie Bunker's Place	Customer #1	Episode: "Murray Klein's Place"
1982	Dallas	Medic	Episode: "The Search"
1982	This Is Kate Bennett...	Manny Resinos	Television film
1982	CHiPs	Technician	Episode: "Rock Devil Rock"
1982, 1985	Cagney & Lacey	Dr. Acuino	2 episodes
1982	Knots Landing	Waiter	Episode: "Man in the Middle"
1982–1987	Hill Street Blues	Reporter	15 episodes
1983	Simon & Simon	Mechanic	Episode: "I Heard It Was Murder"
1985	Airwolf	Radio Operator	Episode: "Prisoner of Yesterday"
1986	Knight Rider	Manuel Gomez	Episode: "Hills of Fire"
1987	The Charmings	Delivery Driver	Episode: "The Mirror Cracked"
1988	Dear John	Brian	Episode: "Pilot"
1990	Drug Wars: The Camarena Story	Abel Reynoso	3 episodes
1990	Quantum Leap	Officer Montero	Episode: "Maybe Baby"
1990	Equal Justice	Foreman	Episode: "Curses"
1991	Out of This World	Luis	Episode: "Evie's Latin Touch"
1991	Sons and Daughters	Security Guard	Episode: "Crime and Punishment"
1992	Empty Nest	Roberto	Episode: "The Return of Aunt Susan"
1993	Sisters	Officer Peck	Episode: "Life Upside-Down"
1993, 2001	NYPD Blue	Renaldo Molina / EMS Officer	2 episodes
1995	Star Trek: Deep Space Nine	Henry Garcia	Episode: "Past Tense, Part II"
1995	Flash Forward	Hector	Episode: "No More Good Days"
1996	Seinfeld	Power Guy	Episode: "The Cadillac"
1996	Grand Avenue	Carlos	Television film
1997	The Sentinel	Cesar Fuente	Episode: "Hear No Evil"
1997	Beverly Hills, 90210	Detective Pate	2 episodes
1997–1999	Days of Our Lives	Priest	7 episodes
1998	Players	Mason	Episode: "Con-tamination"
1998	C-16: FBI	B	Episode: "The Art of War"
1999	Diagnosis: Murder	Walter	Episode: "Gangland: Part 2"
1999	Witness Protection	David Ramirez	Television film
1999, 2005	JAG	Fonseca Godoy / Bernardo	2 episodes
2000	Star Trek: Voyager	Astronomer	Episode: "Blink of an Eye"
2000	The Practice	Mr. Tabbitt	Episode: "Checkmates"
2000–2002	Resurrection Blvd.	Ruben Santiago	53 episodes
2001	Judging Amy	Det. Ben Saganey	Episode: "One for the Road"
2001	Six Feet Under	Mr. Suarez, Jr.	Episode: "The Will"
2002	The Agency	Pablo Martinez	Episode: "Heartless"
2003	Without a Trace	Mr. Arintero	Episode: "Maple Street"
2003	The District	Mario Lopez	Episode: "Blindsided"
2003	The West Wing	Esteban Hernandez	Episode: "Red Haven's on Fire"
2003	Dragnet	Detective Gomez	2 episodes
2003	Nip/Tuck	Pepe	2 episodes
2003	She Spies	Warden Antista	Episode: "Crossed Out"
2003	Boomtown	Carlos Ramirez	Episode: "Wannabe"
2005	Criminal Minds	Captain Griffith	Episode: "Plain Sight"
2006	Alias	The Warden	Episode: "No Hard Feelings"
2008	Weeds	Mexican Pharmacist	Episode: "Yes I Can"
2008	The Prince of Motor City	Marty Korman	Television film
2009	Prison Break	Priest	Episode: "The Mother Lode"
2009	The Closer	Mr. DeLeon	Episode: "Maternal Instincts"
2009	FlashForward	Hector	Episode: "No More Good Days"
2009	The Mentalist	Janitor	Episode: "The Scarlet Letter"
2009	Men of a Certain Age	Javier	Episode: "Mind's Eye"
2010	FutureStates	Felix	Episode: "The Other Side"
2010	CSI: Miami	Luis Velasquez	Episode: "Getting Axed"
2012	The River	Emilio Valenzuela	12 episodes
2014	Rush	Emiliano / Manny's pop	Episode: "Where Is My Mind?"
2015, 2020	Law & Order: Special Victims Unit	Santos Morales / Luis Nuñez	2 episodes
2016	Agents of S.H.I.E.L.D.	Canelo	Episode: "Meet the New Boss"
2016–2018	Chicago Fire	Ramon Dawson	7 episodes
2017	24: Legacy	Luis Diaz	5 episodes
2017	Life in Pieces	Miguel	Episode: "Favorite Vision Miguel Matchmaker"
2021	Why Women Kill	Carlo Castillo	5 episodes
2025	NCIS	Detective Martin Alonzo	Season 22 Episode 11 "For Better or Worse"
