= Destiny Road (film) =

2012 film directed by Robert C. Treveiler

- Film poster
- Directed by: Robert C. Treveiler
- Written by: Robert C. Treveiler
- Based on: Destiny Road by R. R. Soares
- Produced by: Graça Filmes; Uptone Pictures
- Starring: Daniel Zacapa; Traci Dinwiddie; Zoe Myers
- Edited by: Blake Godrey; Billy Orlando
- Music by: Craig Brandwynne
- Distributed by: Independent
- Release date: December 12, 2012
- Running time: 102 minutes
- Countries: Brazil, United States
- Language: English

Destiny Road is a 2012 Brazilian-American Christian drama film directed by Robert C. Treveiler, based on R. R. Soares' 2004 book of the same name. The film stars Daniel Zacapa, Traci Dinwiddie and Zoe Myers. The soundtrack of the film contains Thalles Roberto's song "Maravilha". The film was released on December 12, 2012.

== Plot ==
Frank (Daniel Zacapa) is the dedicated pastor of a small church, obsessed by power and unbridled ambition on behalf of the desire to expand his congregation. Jeremiah (Kevin L. Johnson) is a boy who was born on the outskirts, with a dysfunctional family, which is involved with the world of crime and drugs. Elizabeth (Zoe Myers) was created by an over-protective mother, but to find her great love, experiences a freedom for which was not prepared. Three different stories, three people seeking the same answer to chart a new course in life.

== Cast ==
- Daniel Zacapa as Frank
- Traci Dinwiddie as Fiona
- Zoe Myers as Elizabeth
- Johanna Jowett as Dora
- Daniel Samonas as Johnny
- Elizabeth Brewster as Patricia
- Kevin L. Johnson as Jeremiah
- Tonya Bludsworth as Anne
- Dave Blamy as Joe
- Sharon Graci as Marie
- Rusty Martin as Marty (teen)
- Steven St. Gelais as Jeremiah (young)
- Rusty Martin Sr. as Deacon Banks
- Lu Alone as Jenny

== Production and development ==
Recorded in the state of North Carolina, the film based on the book RR Soares had its story adapted for the American daily life by the film's director, Robert C. Treveiler, the Uptone Pictures, co-producer of the film. Has cast composed by actors Daniel Zacapa, Traci Dinwiddie, Zoe Myers, Johanna Jowett, Daniel Samonas, Elizabeth Brewster, Kevin L. Johnson, Tonya Bludsworth and Lu Alone, among others.

=== Initiative ===
This is the first film produced by Graça Filmes, "Destiny Road" also pioneered the debut scale never achieved by an evangelical film in Brazil (51 theaters). Through the campaign "1 + 2 = 150,000 lives!" which encourages Christians to take two non-Christian friends to the big screen, the film managed, as in the first three days of release; audience of over 54,000 people surpassing therefore the number of viewers for the film room of the then highest grossing weekend, 007: Skyfall. Reached, respectively, the 9th place of the national box office the day 2 to November 5, 8 and 8th the following week. In its third week of view, the long beat their expected public. In order to bring 150,000 people to the cinema, the film managed to achieve 213,098,000 spectators in the third week of the launch month. At the end of the circuit in theaters, the film reached the public about more than 280 thousand spectators. Having released a film of a genre that has never before achieved such a feat, not knowing whether the film would at least the first week of exhibition, the film Destiny Road brought a milestone for the Brazilian film industry evangelical movies.

== Music ==
The soundtrack to Destiny Road was produced by Emmy nominated musician/arranger/producer Craig Brandwynne at Center Sound Productions in Raleigh, North Carolina and included two songs written and performed by North Carolina musician Ryan K. Hamlin, Miracle and Virginia which included cello accompaniment by Madison Chase.
