= Javier Barba-Hernández =

Mexican former lawyer turned enforcer

Javier Barba-Hernández (d. 1986) was a Mexican lawyer turned enforcer, hired by the Guadalajara Cartel to combat the Mexican Federal Judicial Police (FJP) and the American Drug Enforcement Administration (DEA).

Hernandez acted as a warlord for Ernesto Fonseca Carrillo, Rafael Caro Quintero and Miguel Ángel Félix Gallardo. According to the DEA he is believed to have assisted in the transportation of two Americans, John Walker and Alberto Radelat, who were later killed by the cartel under the false suspicion they were DEA agents. Prior to his death he was wanted for questioning in the murder of DEA agent Enrique Camarena.

Barba was killed on November 13, 1986 in a shoot-out with Mexican Federal Judicial Police in Mazatlán, Mexico. The DEA believes this may be part of a cover-up as the FJP has refused to turn over his fingerprints for identification.

== See also ==
- Guadalajara Cartel
- Mexican drug war
