= La Redención =

2018 Paraguayan film directed by Hérib Godoy

La Redenciòn
- Theatrical release poster
- Original title: La Redención
- Directed by: Hérib Godoy
- Written by: Néstor Amarilla Ojeda
- Produced by: Aline Moscato
- Starring: Juan Carlos Notari, Lali González, Ramón del Río, Emilio Barreto, José Barrios, Sergio Cardozo, Mauro Acosta, Blas Filártiga, Aníbal Ortiz, Máximo Florentin
- Cinematography: Armando Aquino
- Edited by: Hérib Godoy
- Music by: Néstor Amarilla Ojeda
- Production company: Tuyupucú Producciones/Anima Films
- Distributed by: LIFE films
- Release date: 31 May 2018
- Running time: 87 minutes
- Country: Paraguay
- Language: Spanish/Guaraní

La Redención is a 2018 Paraguayan historical drama road movie partially set in the Chaco War. This is the second work of director Hérib Godoy after Latas vacías (2014).

== Plot ==
Using a nonlinear narrative, the film depicts the 1991 fictional meeting between José Villalba, a terminally ill Chaco War veteran, and the young Marlene, the granddaughter of a former brother-in-arms. They undertake a journey in search of the whereabouts of Marlene's grandfather through different villages and locations across the Paraguayan countryside. Intermingled with flashbacks of a young Villalba and his companions in the trenches of Nanawa in July 1933, Marlene and José uncover long-time forgotten stories and unearth the past to eventually come to terms with their own lives.

== Production ==
Néstor Amarilla Ojeda wrote the screenplay, while Aline Moscato was in charge of the production.

The film fanpage was available since January 2017.

The movie was shot at Coronel Oviedo and several locations in Caaguazú department during January 2017.

The first backstage was released on 18 February 2018 and uploaded to the movie's website. The first teaser dates back to June 2017. while the trailer was made public on 12 April 2018, and hit more than 100,000 views on social networks.

Godoy had already filmed another historic drama about the Chaco War in 2006, with the short film Guerra re.

== Reception ==
La Redención was released internationally in 2020 on the 13th Latin-American Film Festival of São Paulo in the section Contemporáneos. Brazilian online magazine AdoroCinema made an extense review of the film.

The movie was also invited to the 14th Latin American Film Festival at Melbourne.

== Cast ==
Main roles: Juan Carlos Notari, Lali González.

1991 cast: Ramón Del Río, Emilio Barreto, Miriam Notari, Lucas Godoy, Silvia Villalba, Carlos Balmoriz, Víctor Mujica, Marlene Quiñonez, Gladys Ramírez, Máximo Florentín, Marcos Varela, Álvaro Benítez, Miguel González.

1933 cast: José Barrios, Aníbal Ortiz, Blas Filártiga, Mauro Acosta, Sergio Cardozo, Fidel Fariña, Estanislao Brítez, Juan Ubaldo Godoy, Rolando Sanabria.

== Soundtrack ==
- Un pelotón de humanidad

Purahei Soul Author: Néstor Amarilla Ojeda Arrangements: Purahei Soul Violin: Juanchi Alvarez Harp: Juanjo Corbalan Guitar: Miguel Narvaez Vocals: Edu Benitez Miguel Narvaez Jennifer Hicks

- Voy gritando

Luis Alberto del Paraná y Los Paraguayos Author: Luis Alberto del Paraná Label: Bluecaps

- Mi guitarra y mi voz

Luis Alberto del Paraná y Los Paraguayos Author: Luis Alberto del Paraná and Julio Jara Label: Bluecaps

- 13 Tuyutí

Intérprete: Juan Carlos Oviedo y los Hermanos Acuña Letra: Emiliano R. Fernández Música: Ramón Vargas Colmán Label: The Song

== Online references ==
- ‘La Redención’, un viaje a medias
