= A Place in the Caribbean =

Honduran 2017 romance-drama film

- Film poster
- Spanish: Un lugar en el Caribe
- Directed by: Juan Carlos Fanconi
- Written by: Juan Carlos Fanconi
- Produced by: Sandra Estrada
- Starring: José Zúñiga; Gabriela de la Garza; Gastón Pauls; Lali Gonzalez; Rodrigo Guirao Díaz; Daniel Zacapa; Jamie Bernadette
- Cinematography: David Estrada
- Edited by: Juan Carlos Fanconi
- Music by: Pere Soto; Jason Pfaf
- Production company: Cana Vista Films
- Distributed by: GatebreakR; SOMOS Next
- Release date: 23 March 2017
- Running time: 114 minutes
- Countries: Honduras; United States
- Languages: Spanish; English
- Budget: $2,200,000

A Place in the Caribbean (Spanish: Un lugar en el Caribe) is a 2017 Honduran drama/romance film written and directed by Juan Carlos Fanconi.

== Production ==
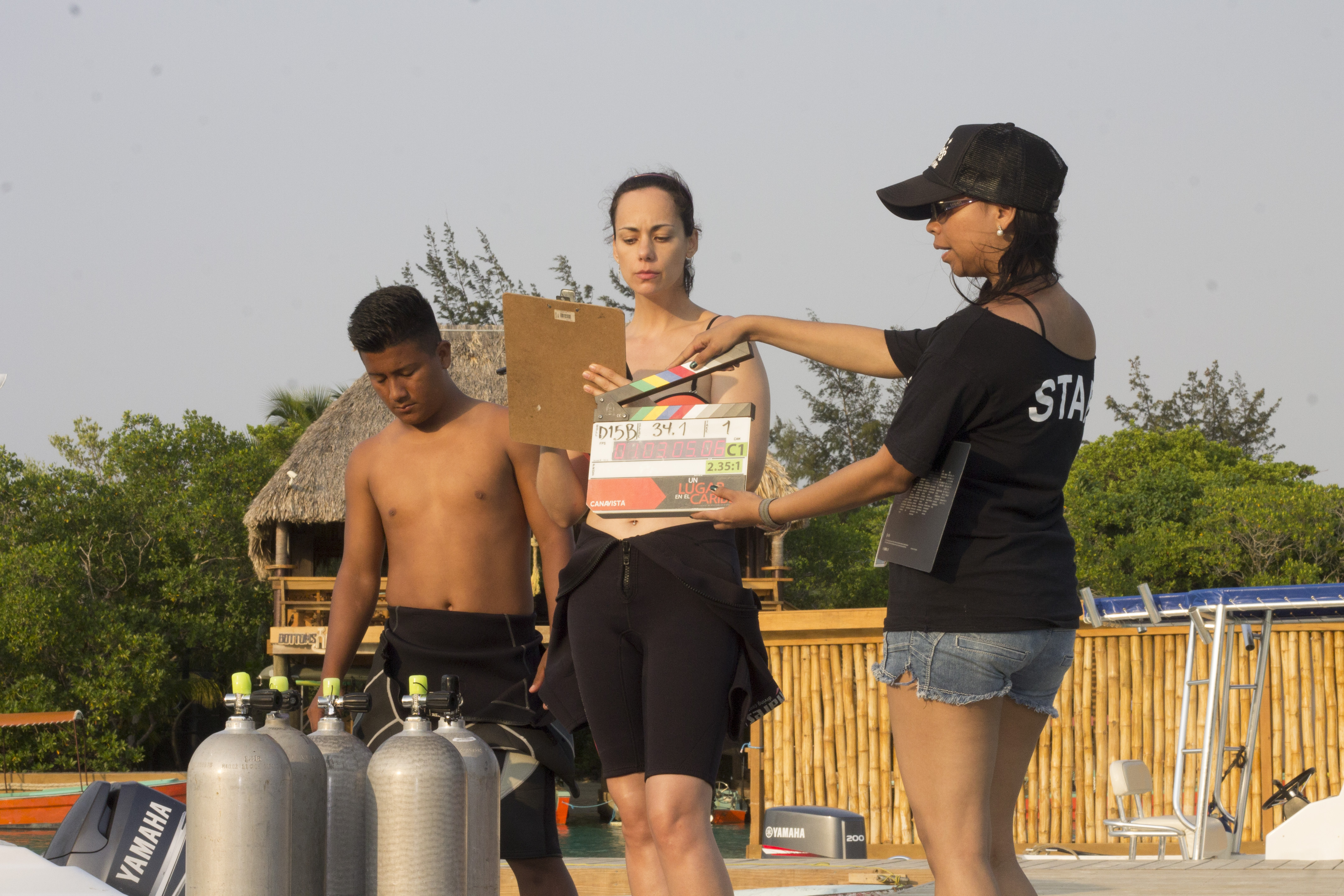
Behind the scenes photo; actress Gabriela de la Garza is in the center.

A Honduran-American coproduction, A Place in the Caribbean was filmed in 2016 in Roatán, Honduras and Los Angeles.

== Synopsis ==
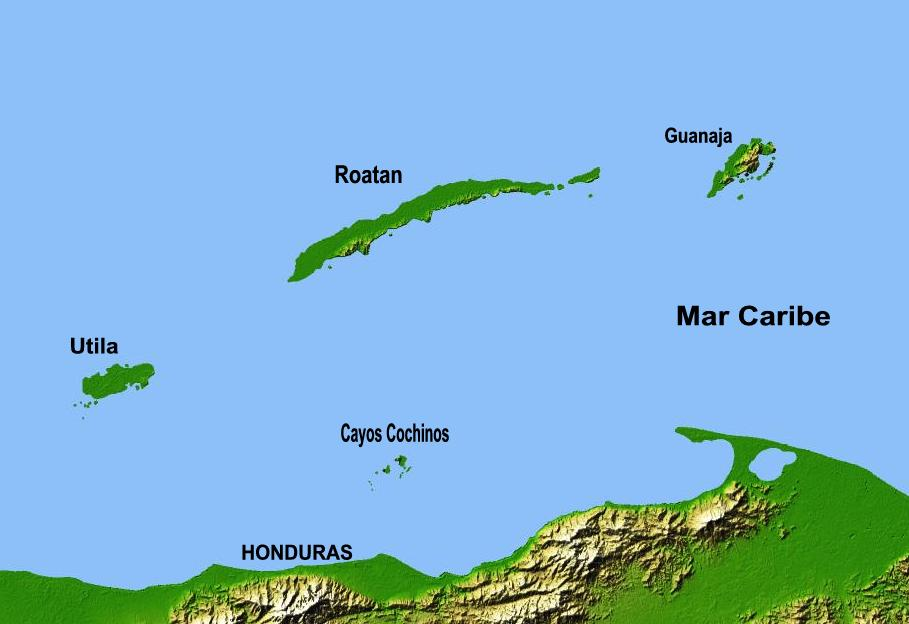
Map of Roatán and nearby islands relative to the Honduran coast.

On the Caribbean resort island of Roatán, a group of people seek love, but their pasts threaten to catch up with them.

== Cast ==
- José Zúñiga – Gael Castillo
- Gabriela de la Garza – Camila
- Gastón Pauls – Fernando
- Lali Gonzalez – Sofía
- Rodrigo Guirao Díaz – Paolo
- Daniel Zacapa – Marcelo
- Jamie Bernadette – Sarah
- Ana Clara Carranza – Ángela
- Fermin Galeano – Sammy
- Boris Barraza – Camila's father
- Maria Elena Vindel – Victoria

== Release ==
The film had its Honduran premiere on 23 March 2017. It was praised by local newspaper El Heraldo as the first Honduran romance film of genuine quality.
