= Gabriela de la Garza =

Mexican actress (born 1976)

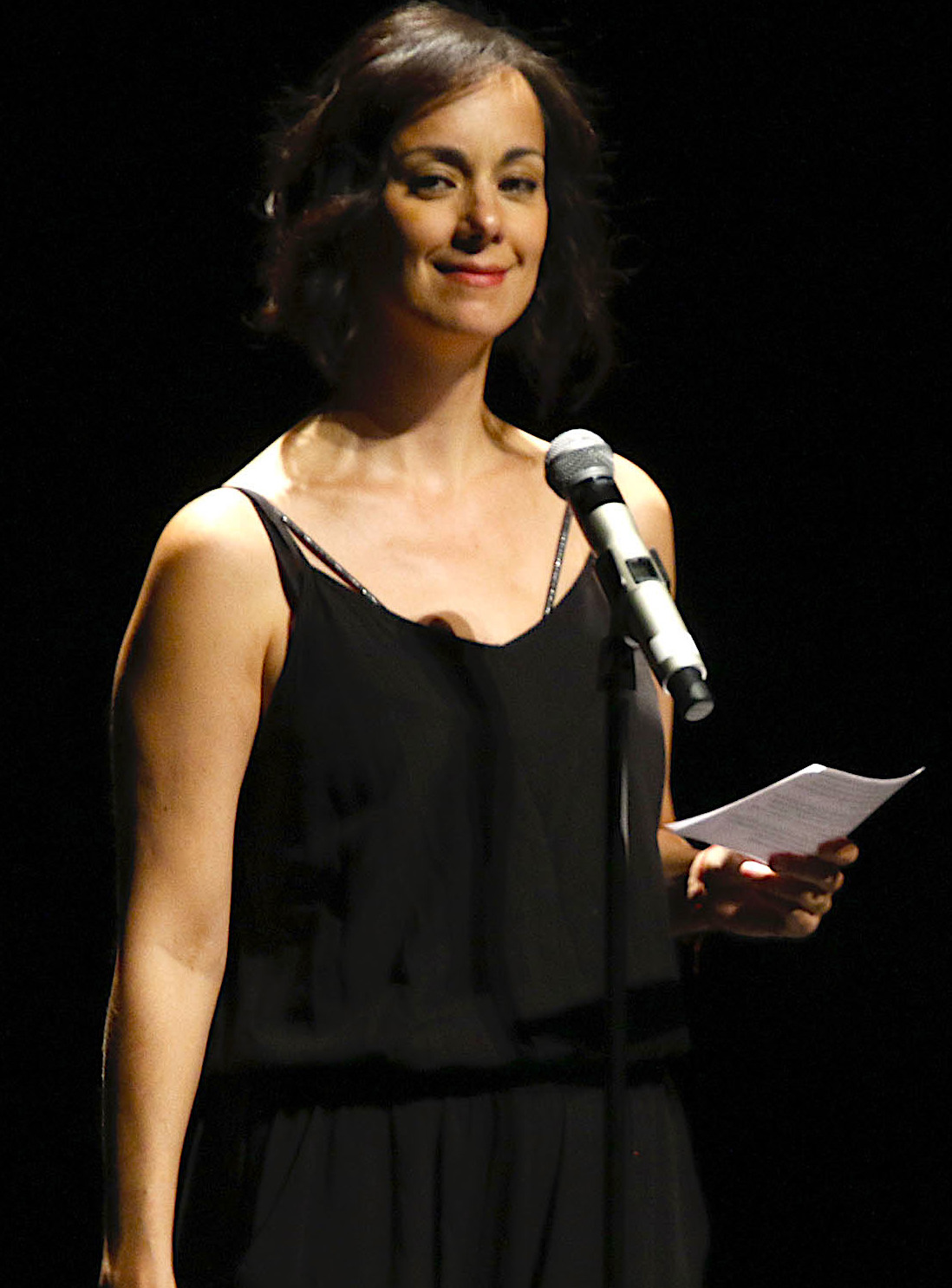
- De la Garza in 2019
- Born: Gabriela de la Garza Githegi; October 3, 1976 (age 49); Mexico City, Distrito Federal, Mexico
- Occupation: Actress
- Years active: 2001–present
- Notable work: Las Aparicio

Gabriela de la Garza (born October 3, 1976), is a Mexican television and film actress.

== Filmography ==
=== Films ===
Year	Title	Role	Notes
2003	Tu mataste a Tarantino		Short film
2006	Un mundo maravilloso	Secretaria del Ministro	
2009	Dragonball Evolution	Avatar	
2011	Nos vemos, papá	Gabriela	
2012	The Fantastic World of Juan Orol	Mary Esquivel	
2013	Sobre ella	Adriana	
2014	Cantinflas	Olga Ivanova	
2017	A Place in the Caribbean	Camila	
2017	El habitante	Angélica	
2018	Lo que siento por ti	Silvia	
2019	Ready to Mingle	Lucila	
2020	La Vida en el Silencio	Mariana	

=== Television ===
Year	Title	Role	Notes
2001	Amores querer con alevosía	Carmela Villalonga	57 episodes
2001–02	Lo que callamos las mujeres	Malena / Diana	30 episodes
2002	El país de las mujeres	Fernanda	
2002	Lo que es el amor	Ximena	68 episodes
2003	Mirada de mujer, el regreso		
2004	Gitanas	Sandra	
2006	Ángel, las alas del amor	Miranda	
2007	Como ama una mujer	Laura	TV mini-series
2007	Cambio de Vida		"Cuestión de enfoques" (Season 1, Episode 14)
2008	Alma legal	Blanca Lumino	
2010	Las Aparicio	Alma Aparicio	
2010	Bienes raíces	Rebeca	13 episodes
2012	Capadocia	Italia Meneses	13 episodes
2012–13	Lynch	Irene	10 episodes
2014	Amor sin reserva	Bárbara	
2015	El capitán Camacho	Machu	
2015	Hoy es un buen día	Deborah	Television film
2015	Narcos	Diana Turbay	"There Will Be a Future" (Season 1, Episode 5); "You Will Cry Tears of Blood" (Season 1, Episode 7); "La Gran Mentira" (Season 1, Episode 8)
2016	Yago	Sara Madrigal	Lead role
2016–17	Vuelve temprano	Clara Zavaleta	
2018	Paramedicos	Cristina Gómez	"Peligro en casa" (Season 3, Episode 2)
2018	Rubirosa	Barbara Hutton	
2019-21	Monarca	Jimena	17 episodes
2021	Amarres	Ana	
2023	Vencer la culpa	Manuela	
2026	Doc	Dr. Ximena Franco	
