= Calexico High School =

Coordinates: 32.6776°N 115.4869°W

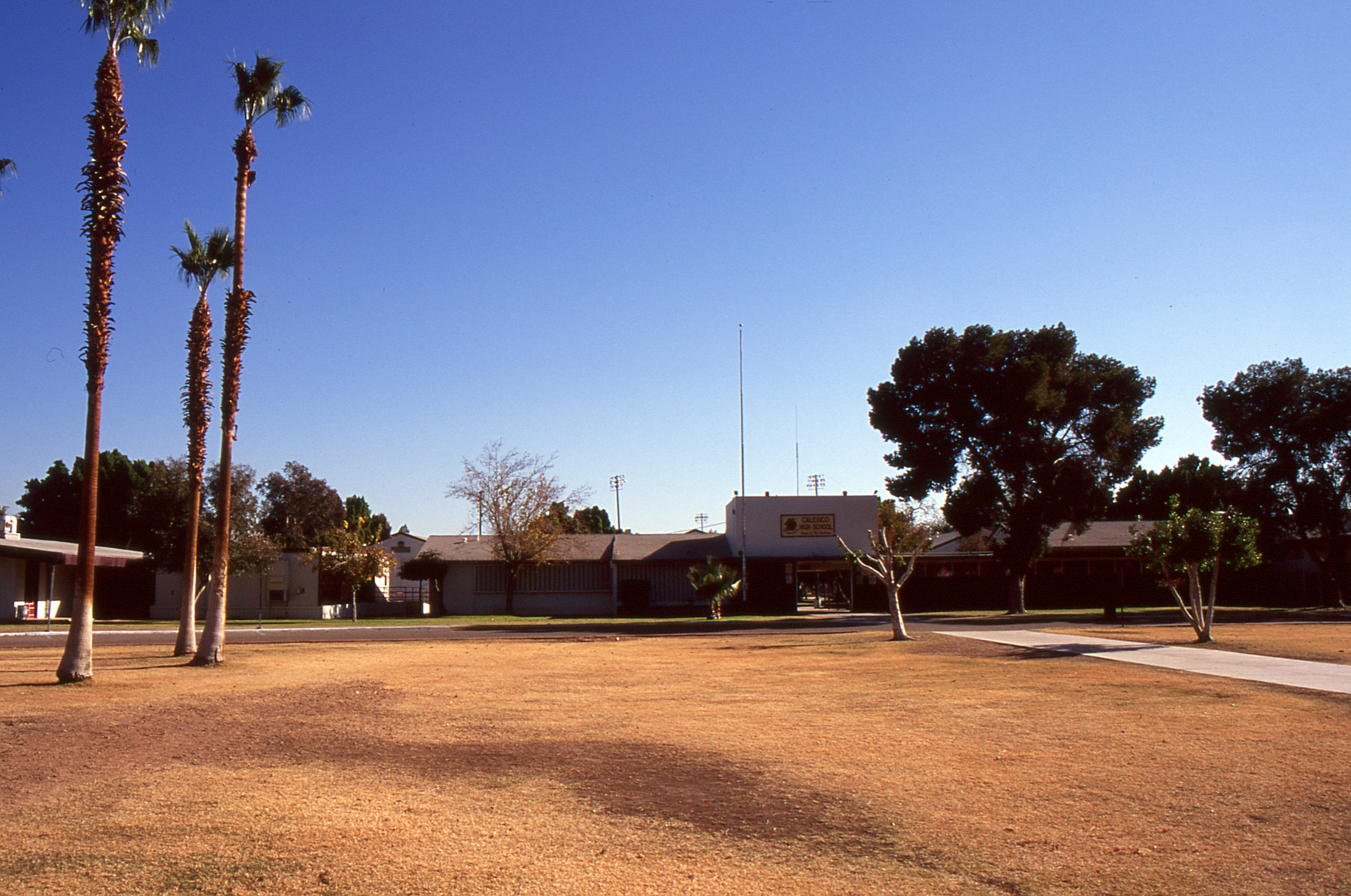
- 1030 Encinas Ave; Calexico, California; United States

Information
- School type: Public
- School district: Calexico Unified
- NCES School ID: 00634
- Staff: 118.07 (on an FTE basis)
- Enrollment: 2,718 (2023–2024)
- Student to teacher ratio: 23.02
- Color
- Mascot: Bulldog
- Yearbook: La Aurora
- Website: chs.cusdk12.org

Calexico High School is a public high school located in Calexico, California, United States.

== Statistics ==
=== Demographics ===
2023-2024 Enrollment by Ethnicity:

Asian	African American	Two or more races	Hispanic/Latino	White
5	0	8	2,963	9

== Notable alumni ==
- Bill Binder, restauranteur
- Kiki Camarena, DEA agent
- Mariano-Florentino Cuéllar, judge and academic
- Henry Lozano, non-profit executive and grassroots organizer
- Ruben Niebla, professional baseball pitcher
