= Elaine Shannon =

American journalist (born 1946)

- Born: November 16, 1946 (age 79); Gainesville, Georgia, U.S.
- Education: Vanderbilt University; Harvard University
- Occupation: Investigative journalist
- Spouse: Dan Morgan
- Children: 1
- Website: www.elaine-shannon.com

Elaine Shannon (born November 16, 1946) is an American investigative journalist and former correspondent for Newsweek and Time considered an expert on terrorism, organized crime, and espionage. Describing her also as "a leading expert on the evil alliances of drug kingpins and corrupt officials", Newsweek said Shannon "could rightly claim to be the Boswell of thugs and drugs."

== Early life ==
Shannon was born in Gainesville, Georgia, on November 16, 1946. She was an English major at Vanderbilt University where she graduated in 1968. While a senior at Vanderbilt, Shannon began working for the Nashville Tennessean where she reported on civil rights, police brutality, and prisoner abuse. In 1970 Shannon became the newspaper's Washington, D.C., correspondent and covered the Senatorial campaign of Albert Gore Sr., the Presidential campaigns of Richard Nixon and George McGovern, and the Watergate scandal. She spent a year at Harvard University where in 1974 she earned a Nieman Fellowship in journalism, then went to work for Newsday the following year.

== Career ==
According to CNN, Shannon "has covered criminal justice issues, including international arms trafficking, drug trafficking and money laundering, organized crime, white collar crime, terrorism and espionage" since 1976. She frequently speaks on issues related to drug trafficking. Through her reporting, Shannon has built "an extensive network of sources as she covered the FBI, DEA, Customs and Justice departments, intelligence and terrorism."

She joined Newsweek in 1976 and covered the Presidential campaigns of Jimmy Carter and Walter Mondale. In October 1986, she left Newsweek to finish writing her New York Times best-selling book about the drug trade, Desperados: Latin Drug Lords, U.S. Lawmen, and the War America Can't Win.

In April 1987, Shannon joined Time where she was a correspondent in their Washington, D.C., bureau. She became a panelist on PBS's To the Contrary in 1993.

== Books ==
Shannon is the author of four books. Her first, Desperados: Latin Drug Lords, U.S. Lawmen, and the War America Can't Win, sold over 130,000 copies. Publishers Weekly stated that Shannon drew on 10 years of expertise covering the international drug scene for Newsweek to write about the 1985 torture-murder of Drug Enforcement Administration agent Enrique "Kiki" Camarena. In his review for the Los Angeles Times, Jonathan Kirsch called Desperados "a sock-in-the-eye work of reporting about America's losing struggle against the multinational, multibillion-dollar drug industry" Desperados also served as the basis for Michael Mann's three-part miniseries Drug Wars: The Camarena Story broadcast on NBC in January 1990. The docudrama received an Emmy award as the best miniseries of 1990. A second miniseries based on Desperados, Drug Wars: The Cocaine Cartel, was broadcast on NBC in January 1992 was also nominated for an Emmy for best miniseries of 1992.

No Heroes: Inside the FBI's Secret Counter-Terror Force was written with Deputy Assistant Director of the FBI Danny Coulson and The Spy Next Door: The Extraordinary Secret Life of Robert Philip Hanssen was co-authored by journalist Ann Blackman.

Shannon's fourth book, Hunting LeRoux, was published in 2019 by William Morrow/HarperCollins. The story discusses Paul Le Roux and the DEA's elite special operation group that tracked him in an effort to bring down his global criminal enterprise. Shannon learned about Le Roux in Afghanistan while researching how warlords and terrorist groups were financed by the heroin trade, and her sources included undercover DEA agents and informants. Mann wrote the foreword of the book and as of 2019 had plan to develop it into a movie. Kirkus Reviews called it a "painstaking, fascinating account of crime and punishment" and said Shannon did an especially good job presenting "how the American Drug Enforcement Administration pieced together its multiagency, multigovernmental case against Le Roux". Jeff Ayers' review described the book as a "gripping account that is both well-written and exhaustively researched".

== Awards ==
Shannon has won the Association for Women in Communications' Clarion Award and the New York State Bar Association Award. In 1992, Shannon and John Moody's two-part cover story in Time about the Cali cartel won the Inter American Press Association's IAPA-Bartolome Mitre Award for distinguished journalism. Their story, "Cocaine, Inc.—The New Drug Kings", addressed the drug problem in the United States.

== Personal life ==
Shannon lives in Washington, D.C., with her husband, Dan Morgan, author and correspondent for The Washington Post. They have a son, Andrew.
