= La encrucijada (TV series) =

- Genre: Drama
- Based on: Brave and Beautiful by Ece Yörenç
- Developed by: Joana Martínez Ortueta
- Directed by: Alexandra Graf
- Creative director: Javier Mampaso
- Starring: Rodrigo Guirao; Ástrid Janer; Abel Folk
- Country of origin: Spain
- Original language: Spanish
- No. of seasons: 1
- No. of episodes: 60

Production
- Executive producer: Lele Portas
- Cinematography: Arturo Hernández
- Camera setup: Multi-camera
- Production companies: Secuoya Estudios; Ay Yapım; Atresmedia TV

Original release
- Network: Antena 3
- Release: 2 July 2025 – 22 January 2026

La encrucijada is a Spanish television series developed by Joana Martínez Ortueta. It is based on the 2016 Turkish series Brave and Beautiful. It stars Rodrigo Guirao, Ástrid Janer and Abel Folk. The series aired on Antena 3 from 2 July 2025 to 22 January 2026.

== Plot ==
César Bravo returns to Spain from Mexico, almost thirty years later, when no one remembers his father's surname or the circumstances surrounding his death and that of his grandparents. Although his adventurous tourist appearance doesn't betray him, he knows exactly what he's there for. He will find no peace until he achieves justice and imprisons Octavio Oramas, the man who appropriated his father's family history and everything that belonged to him to create his own empire. What César doesn't count on is that Amanda Oramas, Octavio's daughter, will cross his path, and he will fall hopelessly in love with her. A chance encounter that marks a turning point in the lives of two rival families.

== Cast ==
=== Main ===
- Rodrigo Guirao as César Bravo / César Hurtado Olavarría
- Ástrid Janer as Amanda Oramas Guevara
- Abel Folk as Octavio Oramas
  - José Sospedra as young Octavio
- Antonio Velázquez as David Oramas Guevara
- Cristóbal Suárez as Álvaro Barahona Casal
- Paula Prendes as Patricia Reyes
- Samantha Siqueiros as Julia Torres
- Candela Márquez as Laura Contreras
- Eduardo Velasco as Humberto
- Isabel Serrano as Mónica Garza
  - Ana Caldas as young Mónica
- Ángela Chica as Sara Vega Molina
- Mauricio Abad as Kevin
- Saida Santana as Carmen Molina
- Óscar de la Fuente as Emilio Vega
- Raúl Sanz as Saúl Garza
- Mamen Camacho as Serrano
- Silvia Marsó as Mariví Casal

=== Recurring ===
- Anna Silvetti as Estrella Olavarría
- Ignacio Montes as Fernando "Nando" Gasco
- David Venancio Muro as Márquez
- Marc Parejo as Roberto Hurtado
- Ana Verónica Schultz as Nancy
- Javier Laorden as Eliseo Garay
- Dani Luque as Diego García

== Production ==
La encrucijada is a collaboration between the Spanish production company Secuoya Studios and the Turkish company Ay Yapım, with the collaboration of Atresmedia TV. Filming took place over six months in the Community of Madrid and the Canary Islands, from June to December 2024.
