= Rodrigo Guirao =

Argentine actor

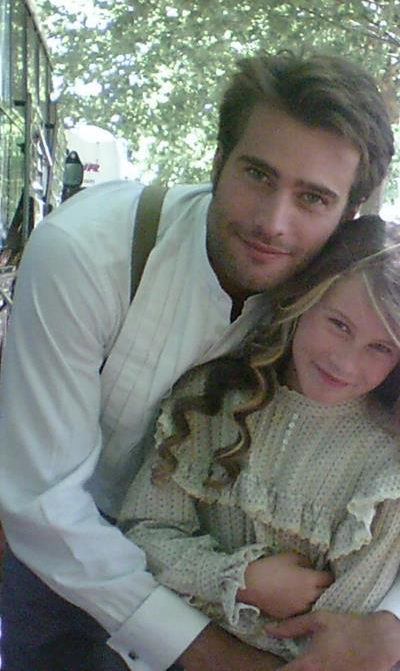
- Guirao in March 2013
- Born: Antonio Rodrigo Guirao Díaz; 18 January 1980 (age 46); Vicente López, Buenos Aires, Argentina
- Occupation: Actor
- Years active: 2002–present

Antonio Rodrigo Guirao Díaz (Spanish pronunciation: [anˈtonjo ɣiˈɾao ˈði.as]; born 18 January 1980), known professionally as Rodrigo Guirao, is an Argentine actor.

== Early life ==
Guirao was born in Vicente López, Buenos Aires. At age 11, he lost his father, and was raised by a single mother. He has two brothers Gonzalo and Ramiro. His cousin, Rocío Guirao Díaz is also a well-known model and actress.

Before turning to acting, Guirao held various jobs as an electrician, cadet, waiter and finally in advertising as a model.

== Career ==
Guirao studied acting at the General San Martín Cultural Center and since then has followed a lot of courses of interpretation.

He began working as a model for graphics and TV commercials and acted in parallel in juvenile series such as Rebelde Way, and in Paraíso Rock.

Between 2006 and 2007, Guirao was the leading man of Araceli González in the Argentine series Amas de casa desesperadas. After that he participated in the TV series Son de Fierro y Patito feo.

Between 2008 and 2009, he was in Atracción x 4, with Luisana Lopilato. Lopilato made her film debut in Cinderella, directed by Alicia Zanca.

In 2009, Guirao starred in Botineras, and between 2010 and 2012 starred in the Italian TV series Terra ribelle, where he played the role of Andrea.

A year later he starred with Italian actress Vittoria Puccini in Violetta, which is based on the novel Lady of the camellias by Alexandre Dumas.

In 2013, Guirao appeared in the Argentine television series Mi amor, mi amor. In Spain, he debuted in Bienvenidos al Lolita, in 2014. In the same country, he starred as first character in Solo Química, a movie directed by Alfonso Albacete. In 2015 he debuted on Telemundo's TV series, filmed in Mexico, Señora Acero. And he participated in the second and third season that is still filming.

Meanwhile, he participated in three films and a short, of which, Baires movie, filmed in Buenos Aires premiered in 2015, the short film directed by Isabel Coixet, "A broken heart is not like a broken vase" in 2016 and A Place in the Caribbean and "5 am", the first made in Roatan, Honduras, and the second one in Buenos Aires.

== Filmography ==
Films

Year	Movie	Character	Director
2015	Baires	'el mono'	Marcelo Páez-Cubells
2015	Solo química	Eric Soto	Alfonso Albacete
2016	Un corazón roto no es como un jarrón roto o un florero	Julio	Isabel Coixet
2017	5 Am	Rafael	Ezio Massa
2017	A Place in the Caribbean	Paolo	Juan Carlos Fanconi
2019	Punto Muerto	'Lupus'	Daniel de la Vega
2021	После тебя / Después de Ti	Matias	José Ramón Chávez
2023	Humo bajo el agua	Patricio	Fabio Junco; Julio Midú
2024	Mi Perfecto Ex	Pablo	

Television

Year	Title	Roles	Notes
2002–2003	Rebelde Way	Matías	2 episodes
2005	Paraíso Rock	Mike	Recurring role; 25 episodes
2005	1/2 falta	Lisandro	Recurring role; 152 episodes
2006	Amas de casa desesperadas	Juan	Recurring role; 23 episodes
2007	Son de Fierro	Bruno	Recurring role; 4 episodes
2007	Patito Feo	Nicolás	Recurring role; 29 episodes
2008	Atracción x4	Francisco Balbuena	Main role; 109 episodes
2009–2010	Botineras	Walter Vázquez	Recurring role; 24 episodes
2010–2012	Terra ribelle	Andrea	Main role (seasons 1–2); 15 episodes
2011	Violetta	Alfredo Germont	Television film
2012	La certosa di Parma	Fabrice Del Dongo	Television film
2012–2013	Mi amor, mi amor	Benjamín Valtierra Fernández	Recurring role; 89 episodes
2014	Bienvenidos al Lolita	Jota	Main role; 8 episodes
2015–2018	Señora Acero	Mario Casas	Recurring role (seasons 1–4); 186 episodes
2019	Campanas en la noche	Detective José Carabajal	Recurring role; 80 episodes
2020	Rubí	Héctor Ferrer Garza	Main role; 26 episodes
2022	Corazón guerrero	Damián Guerrero / Damián Sánchez	Main role; 120 episodes
2023	Juego de mentiras	Francisco Javier del Río	
2025	Me atrevo a amarte	Alejandro Sánchez-Guerra Méndez	Main role
2025	Mujer de otro tiempo	Óscar	TV movie
2025–2026	La encrucijada	César Bravo / César Hurtado Olavarría	Main role

== Theatre ==
- La Cenicienta (2002) as Prince

== Music videos ==
- Erreway - Inmortal (model)

== Music career ==
Guirao is a proficient guitarist and singer with a long-standing interest in blues, rock and roll, and country music. He has cited artists such as Eric Clapton, John Mayer, and Stevie Ray Vaughan as his primary musical influences.

In June 2019, Guirao made a musical pilgrimage to Graceland in Memphis, Tennessee, to pay homage to Elvis Presley. During this visit, he performed live sets in the Beale Street entertainment district, showcasing his skills as a blues guitarist. He has frequently collaborated with local blues bands in Argentina and Mexico, often sharing his guitar sessions with his social media following of over 1.4 million users.
