= Javier Juárez Vázquez =

Mexican journalist

- Died: 30 May 1984 (aged 58); Veracruz, Mexico
- Cause of death: Gunshot wounds
- Occupation: Journalist
- Employer: Primera Plana
- Spouse: Ana Bella Cruz Toledo

Javier Juárez Vázquez was a Mexican journalist who served as director and reporter for the weekly magazine Primera Plana in Coatzacoalcos, Veracruz, where he investigated and exposed connections between the government, law enforcement, and organized crime.

== Career ==
Juárez Vázquez directed and wrote for the independent weekly magazine Primera Plana, published in Coatzacoalcos, Veracruz. In the early 1980s, he reported on government and law enforcement corruption, organized crime, and drug trafficking.

In 1984, Juárez Vázquez published an article revealing the presence of Nicaraguan contras in Mexico. According to the report, a training camp operated in the Sierra Negra region of Puebla, allegedly supported by the Central Intelligence Agency (CIA) and its Mexican counterpart, the Dirección Federal de Seguridad (DFS). A few days later, Juárez Vázquez met with journalist Manuel Buendía in Mexico City to discuss the issue and exchange information.

== Assassination ==
Juárez Vázquez was kidnapped on 30 May 1984 in Coatzacoalcos, Veracruz, and later killed in an unknown location, on the same that Manuel Buendía was assassinated in Mexico City. His body was discovered the following day by a municipal agent near a highway in Mapachapa, in the municipality of Minatitlán, approximately 23 kilometers south of Coatzacoalcos. His hands were bound with electric cable, and the body showed multiple gunshot wounds and extensive bruising.

=== Investigation ===
Initially, there was speculation that the murders of Buendía and Juárez Vázquez were connected. According to Juárez Vázquez’s wife, Ana Bella Cruz Toledo, he had told her fifteen days before his abduction and murder that a municipal employee from the Coatzacoalcos government had warned him that "they were going to kill him". This official was later interviewed by law enforcement but denied issuing any threats against Juárez Vázquez.

An intelligence agent stated that the intellectual and material authors of the murder were a group of Veracruz state police officers, the municipal president of Coatzacoalcos and the leader of a petroleum union, who had threatened Juárez Vázquez because of the critical articles he published in Primera Plana.

Juárez Vázquez's AMC Gremlin was found abandoned in front of the Coatzacoalcos campus of the Veracruzana University. However, no further developments or arrests were made, and his assassination remains unsolved. In 1991, the National Human Rights Commission of Mexico issued a report stating that the investigation was marked by several deficiencies and a lack of willingness by Veracruz state authorities to pursue the case.

== See also ==
- Mexican drug war
- List of journalists killed in Mexico
