= List of Paraguayan films =

A list of films produced in Paraguay. Paraguay produced more than a hundred feature films, including fiction and documentaries, including several important co-productions.

== 1950s ==
Title	Director	Cast	Genre	Notes
1950
1951
1952
1953
1954
1955
Codicia	Catrano Catrani	Sara Antúnez, Ernesto Baez, Guillermo Battaglia	Drama	A western in co-production with Argentina, filmed in the city of San Antonio (Paraguay)
1956
El trueno entre las hojas	Armando Bo	Armando Bo, Isabel Sarli	Drama	Based on the novel of the same name by Augusto Roa Bastos
1957
1958
1959
La sangre y la semilla	Alberto Dubois	César Alvarez Blanco, Ernesto Baez, Raul Valentino Benítez	Drama	Co-production with Argentina, about Paraguayan War
En la vía	Alberto Dubois	Olga Zubarry, Ernesto Báez, Carlos Gómez	Drama	Production with Argentina, never released

== 1960s ==
Title	Director	Cast	Genre	Notes
1960
1961
1962
La Burrerita de Ypacaraí	Armando Bo	Isabel Sarli, Luis Alberto del Paraná, Ernesto Baez	Crime, Drama, Musical	Co-production with Argentina. Contains music and an appearance from Paraguayan singer Luis Alberto del Paraná.
1963
1964
1965
1966
1967
1968
1969

== 1970s ==
Title	Director	Cast	Genre	Notes
1970
1971
1972
1973
1974
1975
1976
1977
1978
Cerro Cora	Guillermo Vera	Roberto De Felice, Rosa Ros, Pedro Ignacio Aceval	War	The first fully Paraguayan production feature film. Funded by the government of Alfredo Stroessner.
O Amante de Minha Mulher	Alberto Pieralisi	David Cardoso, Ira von Fürstenberg, Milton Moraes	Comedy	Co-production with Brasil
1979
O Último Cão de Guerra	Tony Vieira	Hitagibe Carneiro, Renée Casemart, Heitor Gaiotti	Crime	Co-production with Brasil

== 1980s ==
Title	Director	Cast	Genre	Notes
1980
1981
A Cafetina de Meninas Virgens	Agenor Alves, Guillermo Vera	Juan Ramon Benitez, Cinira Camargo, Renée Casemart	Crime	Co-production with Brasil
1982
1983
1984
1985
1986
1987
1988
1989
El Secreto de la Señora	Hugo Gamarra	Blás Alcaraz, Edda de los Rios, Techi Pereira	Drama	Adapted as the first telefilm

== 1990s ==
Title	Director	Cast	Genre	Notes
1990
1991
1992
1993
1994
Miss Ameriguá	Luis R. Vera	Raquel Baeza, Jesús Pérez, Ayesa Frutos	Comedy	Screened at the Gramado Film Festival
1995
1996
De paso por la vida	Carlos Benegas		Drama	
1997
1998
El portón de los sueños	Hugo Gamarra	Justina Aguero, Rosa Elena Blanco, Juanita Espinola	Documentary	About the life and work of the writer Augusto Roa Bastos
O Toque do Oboé	Cláudio MacDowell	Paulo Betti, Mario Lozano, Arturo Fleitas	Drama, Fantasy	Co-production with Brasil
1999

== 2000s ==
Title	Director	Cast	Genre	Notes
2000
2001
2002
María Escobar	Galia Giménez	Ruth Ferreira, José Carlos Aguayo, Miguel Maria Aguayo	Comedy	
Réquiem Por Un Soldado	Galia Giménez	Manuel Cuenca, Manuel Rodríguez, Clara Benítez	Drama, War	
2003
Miramenometokei	Enrique Collar	Claudia Bogarín, Katherine Catolino, Ramon Del Rio	Drama	
2004
Rechts-Links (Derecha-Izquierda)	Augusto Netto y Rafael Kohan		Documentary	About the survivors of the Holocaust, who migrated to Paraguay
Estudio para una siesta paraguaya	Eugenia Blanc, Lía Dansker, Alejandro Nakano		Drama	Co-production with Argentina
2005
Acople	Augusto Netto, Rafael Kohan		Drama	
O Amigo Dunor	José Eduardo Alcázar	Almudena Alcazar, Lyonel Combeçau, Dilma Lóes	Drama	
Cándido López - Los campos de batalla	José Luis García	Odina Leguizamón	Documentary	
Cenizas	Virginia Ferreira, Eduardo Mora		Documentary	
La Tierra Ardía	Manuel Cuenca	Silvino Alegre, Manuel Cuenca, Manuel Rodríguez	History, War	
2006
Hamaca Paraguaya	Paz Encina	Ramon Del Rio, Georgina Genes, Jorge López	Drama	Screened at the 2006 Cannes Film Festival
Carimea	Ray Armele		Drama	
Tierra roja	Ramiro Gómez		Documentary	Portrait of the life of peasant families
2007
El Invierno de Gunter	Galia Giménez	Emilio Barreto, Victor Bohbout Chávez, Manuel Cuenca	Drama	
Profesión cinero	Hugo Gamarra		Documentary	History about the golden age of mobile cinema and neighborhood cinemas
Casos de Misterio	Ramón Ramoa Salcedo		Mystery	Filmed in the city of Pilar
2008
El reflejo	Gustavo Delgado		Drama	Set in the successive financial crises since 1996
Acosta Ñu	Ramón Ramoa Salcedo		Drama	About the battle of the War of Paraguay, in which 3,500 child soldiers died
El regalo de Sofía	Leticia Coronel y Hugo Cataldo Barudi		Drama	
Error de imprenta	Nilfe Vera y Aragón		Horror	
Detrás del sol: Más cielo	Gastón Gularte		Drama	Co-production with Argentina
Frankfurt	Ramiro Gómez		Documentary	Presents a group of soccer players of the rural league.
Paraguay fue noticia	Ricardo Álvarez		Documentary	About the fire at the Ycuá Bolaños supermarket, where almost 400 people died in 2004
2009
Circo pe	Miguel Agüero		Documentary	Portrait of one of the last itinerant circuses in the country
Relatos de Curupayty	Ramón Ramoa Salcedo		Mystery	Filmed in the city of Pilar

== 2010s ==
Title	Director	Cast	Genre	Notes
2010
Felipe Canasto	Dario Cardona Herreros	Beto Ayala, Ramon Del Rio, Liber Fernandez	Drama	
Universo Servilleta	Luis Aguirre	Esteban Aguirre, María José Cacavelos, José Carvallo	Drama	
Semana Capital	Hugo Cataldo	Luis Aguirre, Natalia Alvarenga, Paola Amaini	Comedy, Drama	
Cuchillo de palo	Renate Costa	Miguel Auad Petunia, Nancy Baruja, Renate Costa	Documentary	
Novena	Enrique Collar	Juan de Dios Collar, Teodora Gonzalez, Bernardino Ojeda	Drama	Screened at the Mar del Plata Film Festival
18 cigarrillos y medio	Marcelo Tolces		Drama	Co-production with España and México
La tierra sin mal	Anna Recalde Miranda		Documentary	Coproduction with Francia and Italia
2011
Che pykasumi	Ermes Medina Valiente	José Fleitas, Alicia Arce	History, Drama, Romance	History about the poet Cecilio Valiente and the inspiration of his most famous poem
1811, Jirones de Gloria	Ramón Ramoa Salcedo		History	Filmed in the city of Pilar
Tren Paraguay	Mauricio Rial Banti		Documentary	
Santo de la Guitarra: La historia fantástica de Agustín Barrios Mangoré	Carlos Salcedo Centurión		Documentary	
2012
7 Boxes	Juan Carlos Maneglia, Tana Schembori	Celso Franco, Víctor Sosa, Lali Gonzalez	Thriller	Nominated at the 27th Goya Awards for Best Spanish Language Foreign Film. Screened at many film festivals, including San Sebastián, Mar del Plata, Toronto, Guadalajara, India, Miami and Palm Springs.
Libertad	Gustavo Delgado	Rafael Alfaro, Fiorella Migliore, Jorge Ramos	History	
Vínculos	José María Dávalos		Romance	
Migraña/La enamorada	Martín Crespo		Drama	Based on texts by the Spanish writer Rafael Barret
Un Revolber en la Chaca	Luis A. Aguirre	Revolber	Documentary, Music	
2013
Costa Dulce	Enrique Collar	Juan de Dios Collar, Christian Riveros, Eladia Velazquez	Drama, Mystery	Screened at the Mar del Plata Film Festival
Fin de la línea	Gustavo Delgado	Lucía Valdez, Sergio González	Action	
Lectura Según Justino	Arnaldo André	Julieta Cardinali, Mike Amigorena, Diego Gonzalez	Drama	
El azúcar del naranjo	Galia Giménez		Drama	
Eliza Lynch: Queen of Paraguay	Alan Gilsenan		History, Documentary	Production of Ireland on the lover of Marshal Francisco Solano López
Esperanza	Enrique Carballido, Sylvie Moreaux		Documentary	Co-production with France, with the testimony of 35 artists about the dictatorship of Alfredo Stroessner
2014
Latas Vacías	Hérib Godoy	Fátima Aquino, Sergio Cardozo, Blas Filártiga	Mystery	First feature film of the city of Coronel Oviedo
Luna de cigarras	Jorge Diaz de Bedoya	Lali Gonzalez, Nathan Christopher Haase, Andrea Quattrocchi	Drama	Screened at the Madrid International Film Festival
El tiempo nublado	Arami Ullon	Mirna Villalba, Arami Ullón, Luis Ullón	Documentary, Drama, Family	Paraguayan entry for the Best Foreign Language Film at the 88th Academy Awards
Poder e impotencia, un drama en 3 actos	Anna Recalde Miranda		Documentary	Co-production with Francia and Italia, about the government and the dismissal of President Fernando Lugo
2015
Boquerón	Tonchy Antezana		History	Production of Bolivia on one of the main battles of the Chaco War
Sin Salida/No Way Out	Héctor Echavarría		Action	
Landfill Harmonic	Brad Allgood, Graham Townsley, Juliana Penaranda-Loftus	Ada Ríos, María de Jesús Ríos, Tania Vera, Noelia Ríos, Nicolás Gómez	Documentary	Screened at many film festivals, including Vancouver, SXSW, Maui, Long Beach, Leeds and Cleveland
Chicas nuevas 24 horas	Mabel Lozano		Documentary	Co-production of Paraguay, Spain, Argentina, Colombia and Peru, nominated for the Goya and Platinum awards
Mangoré, por amor al arte	Luis R. Vera	Damián Alcázar, Rafael Alfaro, Clotilde Cabral, Manuel Cuenca	Biography	The most expensive Paraguayan film, with 1,500,000 dollars
La Chiperita	Hugo Cataldo	Rafael Alfaro, Bruno Sosa Bofinger, Hebe Duarte, Patty Paredes	Romance, comedy	
Felices los que lloran	Marcelo Torcida	Harry Stanley, Carlos Cabra, Carlos Echevarría	Drama	Won two prizes of "Oscar for religious cinema", at the Vatican film festival
Ore ru	Armando Aquino		Documentary, Religious	About the first visit of Pope Francis
Rúa	Daniela Candia		Documentary	Portrays the festivities of San Pedro and San Pablo, in the city of Altos
2016
Guaraní	Luis Zorraquin	Hebe Duarte, Emilio Barreto, Jazmin Bogarin	Drama	Co-production with Argentina
Gritos del Monday	Hector XIIX Rodriguez	Clotilde Cabral, Solange Mendez Flores, Ana Ivanova	Horror	First Paraguayan horror feature film.
El secuestro	Hugo Javier Cardozo		Drama, Action	First production of the city of Encarnación.
La última tierra	Pablo Lamar	Ramón del Río, Vera Valdez	Drama	Coproducción with Holanda, Chile and Qatar
Un suelo lejano	Gabriel Muro		Documentary	Argentine production about Nueva Germania, the truncated German colony of the sister of Friedrich Nietzsche
Hoy partido a las tres	Clarisa Navas		Comedy, Sport	Production of Corrientes, Argentina, with minority Paraguayan participation
Paraguay, droga y banana	Juan Manuel Salinas		Documentary	The history of drug trafficking in Paraguay and the figure of General Andrés Rodríguez
2017
Truenos	Mario Goia	Robert Grange, Juanse Buzó, Rubén Zapattini, Ariel Margatti, Ricardo Quintana	Action, Comedy	
Santificar lo profano	Agustín Núñez	Hector Lozzca, Lety Mancuello	Drama	
Saber Crecer	Pedro Noah Espínola, Walter Hermosa Jr.	Gonzalo Martinez, Constanza Coscia, Pedro Noah Espínola	Drama, Young	The entire team was under 21 years of age
Los Buscadores	Juan Carlos Maneglia, Tana Schembori	Tomás Arredondo, María Cecilia Torres, Mario Toñánez, Christian Ferreira	Adventure, Comedy	Paraguayan entry for the Best Foreign Language Film at the 90th Academy Awards
2018
La Redención	Hérib Godoy	Juan Carlos Notari, Lali González, Emilio Barreto, Ramón del Río, José Barrios, Sergio Cardozo, Mauro Acosta, Blas Filartiga, Aníbal Ortiz	Drama, History, Road Movie	
The Heiresses	Marcelo Martinessi	Ana Brun, Margarita Irun, Ana Ivanova, Nilda Gonzalez, María Martins, Alicia Guerra	Drama	Won two Silver Berlin Bears (Best Actress and Alfred Bauer Prize) at the 2018 Berlin International Film Festival. Paraguayan entry for the Best Foreign Language Film at the 91st Academy Awards
Leal, solo hay una forma de vivir	Rodrigo Salomón, Pietro Scappini	Luis Aguirre, Fini Bocchino, Bruno Sosa, Fabio Chamorro, Dani Da Rosa, José Fretes, Andrea Frigerio, David Gerber, Ana Maria Imizcoz, Mauricio A. Jortack, Felix Medina, Alcides Oviedo Cáceres, Andrea Quattrocchi, Sergio Quiñonez, Silvio Rodas	Action, Crime, Drama	First Paraguayan film to be available on Netflix.
2019
Orsai	Emiliano Gómez	Rafael Alfaro, Paola Maltese, Héctor Silva, Martín Oviedo, Tomás Arredondo, Ximena Ayala, Renato Gómez, Lucrecia Carrillo	Comedy, Family, Romance	
Morgue	Hugo Cardozo	Francisco Ayala, María del Mar Fernández, Abel Martínez, Pablo Martínez, Raúl Rotela, Willi Villalba, Aldo Von Knobloch	Horror, Thriller	
Cadete Amarilla, mi hijo	Patricia Aguayo Royg		Documentary	Paraguayan entry for the Best Iberoamerican Film at the 34th Goya Awards; and for the same category at the 62nd Ariel Awards.
El Supremo Manuscrito	Jorge Diaz de Bedoya, Michael Kovich Jr.	Sary López, Nathan Christopher Haase, Fernando Abadie, Rafael Alfaro, Ricardo Dalmacci, Javier Enciso, Sandra Guillén, Andrea Quattrocchi	Drama, Thriller	
Matar a un muerto	Hugo Giménez	Ever Enciso, Aníbal Ortiz, Silvio Rodas, Jorge Román	Political thriller	
Luz	Juan Diego Escobar Alzate	Yuri Vargas	Fantasy-western horror	

== 2020s ==
Title	Director	Cast	Genre	Notes
2020
Nothing but the Sun	Arami Ullón		Documentary	
2021
Lima 3.31	Marcelo Torcida, Doc Benson		Drama	In Post-production. First Paraguayan English language feature film.
2022
Eami	Paz Encina	Anel Picanerai, Curia Chiquejno Etacoro, Ducubaide Chiquenoi, Basui Picanerai Etacore, Lucas Etacori, Guesa Picanerai, Lazaro Dosapei Cutamijo	Drama	
Guapo'y	Sofía Paoli Thorne	Celsa Ramírez	Documentary	Winner - Best First Feature - Special Mention at the 35th International Documentary Film Amsterdam; Winner - Documentary Competition - Best Director at the 26th Málaga Film Festival; Winner - Human Rights Film Competition - Best Film & Audience Award at the 41st International Film Festival of Uruguay; Nominated - Best Documentary at the 27th Lima Film Festival
The List	Michael J. Hardy		Thriller	
2023
The Apartment	Michael Kovich Jr.	Bruno Sosa, Andrea Quattrocchi, Fernando Abadie, Roberto Cardozo, Clotilde Cabral	Horror	
The Last Runway 2, Commando Yaguarete	Armando Aquino & Mauricio Rial	Andrea Quattrocchi, Lali González, Renato Gómez, Bruno Sosa Bofinger, Bruno Sosa, Félix Medina, Amambay Narváez, Germano Holanda, Ana Maria Imizcoz, Mauricio A. Jortack, Rafael Kohan, Fabio Chamorro, Victoria Fretes, David Gerber, Hugo Jesus González, Silvio Rodas, Calolo Rodriguez, Sergio Quiñonez Román, Antonella Zaldivar, Luis Zorrilla	Action	Sequel to the 2018 film The Last Runway
La última obra	Héctor Duarte	Mauricio Martínez, Gina Benedetti, Sandra "Kúku" Flecha, Rodrigo Caballero, Jimmy Rojas, Borja García-Enríquez, Ever Enciso	Thriller	
2024
Do Not Enter	Hugo Cardozo	Lucas Caballero, Pablo Martínez, Rafael Alfaro, Lara Chamorro, Andy Romero, Mario González Martí, Ariel Delgadillo, Lia Love	Horror, Thriller	Premiered at the 77th Cannes Film Festival at the 2nd Fantastic Pavilion Gala
Just One Spring	Joaquín Pedretti	Majo Cabrera, Salma Vera, Ever Enciso, Miguel Romero, Mauricio Paniagua, Sonia Tiranti	Drama	
2025
About Astronauts and Ghosts	Luis R. Vera	Héctor Silva, Tomás Arredondo, Sofía Netto Barrios, Raquel Baeza	Drama	Nominated - Best Film at the 40th Ibero-Latin American Film Festival of Trieste Winner - Special Jury Prize at the 40th Ibero-Latin American Film Festival of Trieste
Under the Flags, the Sun	Juanjo Pereira		Documentary	It was selected as the Paraguayan entry for the Best International Feature Film at the 98th Academy Awards.

== List of Paraguayan short films ==
- Alma Paraguaya (1925)
- Asunción a Cuatro Tiempos (1997)
- Cachorros de León, la Batalla de Boqueron (1997)
- La Cajita Feliz (2004)
- Campaña Electoral Con la Presencia de Eligio Ayala (1927)
- Candida (2003)
- Cariñoso (1986)
- La Catástrofe de Encarnación (1926)
- Caños (1987)
- De Amor y de Guerra (1997)
- Desde el Tejado (1986)
- Desfile Militar (1926)
- El Que se Aburra Aquí es Porque No Sabe Distraerse (1926)
- Emboscada, campo de concentración (1997)
- En el Infierno del Chaco (1932)
- Estigarribia: Militar y Presidente (1998)
- Estudio Para Una Siesta Paraguaya (2004)
- La Fiesta (1988)
- Las Gaviotas no Hablan Inglés (1996)
- La Guerra del Chaco (1933)
- Horno Ardiente (2002)
- Independencia (1997)
- Manifestación Frente al Congreso (1928)
- Paraguay, Tierra de Promisión (1937)
- Proceso de Cambio (1988)
- El Pueblo (1971)
- Revista Militar en Campo Grande (1926)
- Rutina (1987)
- La Selva Debe Vivir: Los Ache del Ñacunday (1997)
- El Señor Ministro del Interior (1927)
- Sepelio de Eligio Ayala (1930)
- El Siglo Que Se Va (2000)
- Una y Media (2001)
- Vistas del Paraguay (1929)
- Los Yshyr de Karchavalut (1997)
