= LGBTQ rights in Paraguay =

- Paraguay
- Legal status: Legal since 1990, age of consent not equal
- Gender identity: None
- Military: Gay, lesbian and bisexual people allowed to serve openly
- Discrimination protections: Limited sexual orientation and gender identity protections

Family rights
- Recognition of relationships: None
- Restrictions: Constitution limits marriage and de facto unions to one man and one woman
- Adoption: Single persons not restricted

Lesbian, gay, bisexual, and transgender (LGBT) people in Paraguay face legal challenges not experienced by non-LGBT residents. Both male and female types of same-sex sexual activity are legal in Paraguay, but same-sex couples and households headed by same-sex couples are not eligible for all of the same legal protections available to opposite-sex married couples. Paraguay remains one of the few conservative countries in South America regarding LGBT rights.

On 8 January 2018, the Inter-American Court of Human Rights (IACHR) issued an advisory opinion that states party to the American Convention on Human Rights should grant same-sex couples accession to all existing domestic legal systems of family registration, including marriage, along with all rights that derive from marriage. Since then, there has been a pending lawsuit to recognize same-sex marriage that relies on the IACHR advisory opinion.

== Law regarding same-sex sexual activity ==
Same-sex sexual activity has been legal in Paraguay since 1990. The age of consent in Paraguay is 16 for homosexuals and 14 for heterosexuals.

During the dictatorship of Alfredo Stroessner from 1954 to 1989, LGBT people faced heavy persecution and were forced to maintain secret lives. On 1 September 1959, a fire broke out in the capital city of Asunción. Bernardo Aranda, a well-loved radio announcer, died in the fire. Police intervened and blamed 108 gay men for the fire. The case is known today as the "Case 108" (Caso 108). The men were arrested, tortured and their names made public. The press then blamed homosexuality as the cause of Aranda's death, with the Government of Stroessner publicly encouraging hatred and violence against LGBT people, calling them "evil", "vicious" and "abnormal". LGBT groups have sought to honour the victims of Case 108, and in 2010 filmmaker Renate Costa, whose uncle was one of the 108, released a documentary, 108 Cuchillo de Palo, consisting of interviews of survivors of Case 108 and reveals the persecution they faced.

== Recognition of same-sex relationships ==
Recognition of same-sex unions in South America Marriage Other type of partnership Unrecognized Constitution limits marriage to opposite-sex couples Same-sex sexual activity illegal, though penalties not enforced

There is no legal recognition of same-sex couples. Since 1992, the Constitution of Paraguay has limited marriage, de facto unions and the family to "one man and one woman".

- Article 49, entitled "Protection of the Family", states: "The family is the foundation of society. Its comprehensive protection will be promoted and guaranteed. This comprises the stable union of a man and a woman, their children, and the community formed with any of the ancestors or their descendants."
- Article 50, entitled "Right To Constitute a Family", states: "Everyone has the right to constitute a family, in a formation and development under which a man and a woman will have the same rights and obligations."
- Article 51, entitled "Legal Marriages and the Effects of De Facto Unions", states: "The law will establish the formalities to be observed for the marriage between a man and a woman, the requirements for contracting it, and the causes for separation or dissolution and its effects, as well as property management provisions and other rights and obligations between spouses. A de facto union between a man and a woman, having no legal impediments to getting married and being characterized by stability and monogamy, produces a similar effect to that of a legal marriage, in accordance with the provisions established by law."
- Article 52, entitled "Union in Marriage", states: "The union in marriage by a man and woman is one of the fundamental factors in the formation of a family."

In addition, Article 140 of the Paraguayan Civil Code expressly prohibits marriage between persons of the same sex.

In July 2010, the SOMOSGAY organization announced their intention to submit a same-sex marriage bill to Parliament. Though, no vote happened.

In May 2017, presidential candidate Santiago Peña of the ruling Colorado Party announced his support for same-sex marriage. He was quickly criticised by many deputies as well as President Horacio Cartes, who months prior had unsuccessfully tried to amend the Constitution to allow him to be re-elected, a move considered anti-democratic by Opposition parties. In 2013, Cartes was quoted as saying that he would shoot a bullet into his testicles were his son to express interest in marrying another man ("Me pego un tiro en las bolas", literally "I would shoot myself in the balls").

On 12 January 2018, SOMOSGAY announced its intention to file a petition with the Supreme Court of Justice, asking the court to legalize same-sex marriage in the country, citing the 9 January 2018 advisory opinion by the Inter-American Court of Human Rights (IACHR) that signatories to the American Convention on Human Rights (of which Paraguay is one) are "required" to allow same-sex couples to marry. Government officials reacted negatively to the IACHR advisory opinion. In March 2018, presidential candidate Mario Abdo Benítez (Colorado Party) stated he would veto any same-sex marriage bill that passes Congress. He won the election. Other opponents of the IACHR opinion have falsely claimed that it does not apply to Paraguay. In March 2019, with 24 votes in favor, the Senate of Paraguay approved a draft declaration declaring itself "pro-life and pro-family", expressing opposition to same-sex marriage and abortion. The move was criticised by many lawmakers who maintained that the state is secular and cannot impose moral principles or values linked to a religion.

== Adoption and parenting ==
Since 1997, the Adoption Law (Spanish: Ley de Adopciones. Ley 1136 de 1997) states that single persons, of any sex, may adopt regardless of their marital status. Marriages and de facto unions between persons of the opposite sex, and single women have equal preference in adoption.

== Discrimination protections ==
In Paraguay, there is no broad legal protection against LGBTI discrimination through an anti-discrimination law, however, some specific laws and decrees contemplate in their articles the prohibition of discrimination or protection based on sexual orientation or gender identity, such as:

- Law 5162/2014 Criminal Enforcement Code, Title II on Execution of measures imposed on adolescents, Chapter III, part of article 274 establishes that: "When adolescents must be accommodated in collective dormitories, the following shall be taken into account: age, sexual orientation and the degree of psychic development for the respective distribution."
- Decree 6973 regulating Law 577/2016 on "Comprehensive protection of women against all forms of violence", in its article 3 on "Protected persons" establishes that the protection of women in situations of violence without any kind of discrimination based on sexual orientation.
- Law 6149/2018 on Protection and Facilities for the Naturalization of Stateless Persons, in its article 9 on "Non-discrimination" establishes that: "The authorities will guarantee the free and full exercise of all the rights recognized in this law to the stateless person or applicant for recognition of such a condition that is subject to the jurisdiction of the country, without any discrimination based on sexual orientation and gender identity."
- Law 6534/2020 on the Protection of Personal Credit Data, in its article 3(b) defines as sensitive personal data "Those that refer to the intimate sphere of its owner, or whose improper use may give rise to discrimination or entail a serious risk personal data that may reveal aspects such as racial or ethnic origin; religious, philosophical and moral beliefs or convictions; union affiliation; political opinions; data related to health, life, preference or sexual orientation, data genetic or biometric data intended to uniquely identify a natural person."

In November 2015, a bill to ban discrimination based on sexual orientation and gender identity was introduced to the Congress, but it hasn't advanced since.

Article 28 of the Internal Rules and Regulations of the Ministry of Public Defense (Spanish: Reglamento Interno del Ministerio de la Defensa Pública) prohibits discrimination based on sexual orientation against employees of the Defense Ministry.

== Gender identity and expression ==
In Paraguay, transgender people are not allowed to legally change their name and gender on official documents. In 1993 María Gloria Bobadilla brought a case before the Paraguayan Civil Court on behalf of a Paraguayan living in Italy, Ramón Fidel, who had undergone gender reassignment surgery and wanted to be officially registered as a woman and not as a man. However, Fidel died in a traffic accident before the case could be decided. In December 2016, two transgender women – Yren Rotela and Mariana Sepúlveda – filed a lawsuit to change their names, based on article 25 of the Constitution on free expression and free construction of identity, and article 42 of the Civil Code that allows the change of first name.

In October 2016, the Ministry of Public Health and Social Welfare approved Resolution 695 (Resolución 695) establishing that all transgender people may use their social name on medical records, medical history and forms. It also states that officials working in Integrated Networks of Health Services (RIISS) will be required to provide assistance and obligatory treat transgender patients with the social name with which they identify themselves.

== Conversion therapy ==
Law 7018 on Mental Health, enacted on November 15, 2022, states in its article 3 that "In no case can a diagnosis be made in the field of mental health on the exclusive basis of sexual choice or identity."

== Military service ==
There is no official prohibition that prevents the entry of gays, lesbians and bisexuals into the Armed Forces of Paraguay and the National Police.

In June 2010, the Chamber of Deputies rejected, by 42 votes against and 4 in favor, a bill that would have prohibited the entry of homosexuals into the Public Force, which consists of the military and the police forces.

== School curriculum ==
In October 2017, the Government of Paraguay implemented a ban on discussion of LGBT issues within public schools. The Minister of Education added that it might even consider burning books that raise awareness about transgender people.

== Living conditions ==
Paraguay is considered to be one of South America's most conservative countries. Reports of violence and discrimination against members of the LGBT community are frequent, and are often ignored by the police. The Catholic Church retains a strong influence and presence in the country, and has strongly opposed measures to improve the lives of LGBT people. Attitudes among the general population towards same-sex marriage and LGBT rights more generally remain low compared to other South American countries, especially neighbouring Argentina and Brazil. Additionally, a recent rise in religious fundamentalism has caused concern among LGBT advocacy groups.

=== Pride marches ===
Since 2004, LGBT groups have organised pride parades in Asunción.

== Public opinion ==
According to a Pew Research Center survey, conducted between 26 November 2013 and 8 January 2014, 15% of Paraguayans supported same-sex marriage, 81% were opposed.

The 2017 AmericasBarometer showed that 26% of Paraguayans supported same-sex marriage.

== Summary table ==
Same-sex sexual activity legal	Yes (Since 1990)
Equal age of consent	No
Anti-discrimination laws in employment only	No / Yes (Some limited protections for government employees)
Anti-discrimination laws in the provision of goods and services	No
Anti-discrimination laws in all other areas (incl. indirect discrimination, hate speech)	No
Same-sex marriages	No (Constitutional ban since 1992)
Recognition of same-sex couples	No (Constitutional ban on de facto unions since 1992)
Stepchild adoption by same-sex couples	No
Joint adoption by same-sex couples	No
Lesbians, gays and bisexuals allowed to serve in the military	Yes
Right to change legal gender	No
Sexual orientation conversion therapy banned by law	Yes (Since 2022)
Access to IVF for lesbians	No
Surrogacy for gay male couples	No
MSMs allowed to donate blood	Yes (MSM individuals are not singled out and have to follow the same criteria as everyone else)

== See also ==
- Human rights in Paraguay
- LGBT rights in the Americas
- Same-sex union court cases
- Persecution and discrimination of LGBTQ+ people in Paraguay (1954–1989)
