= Platino Award for Best Actress =

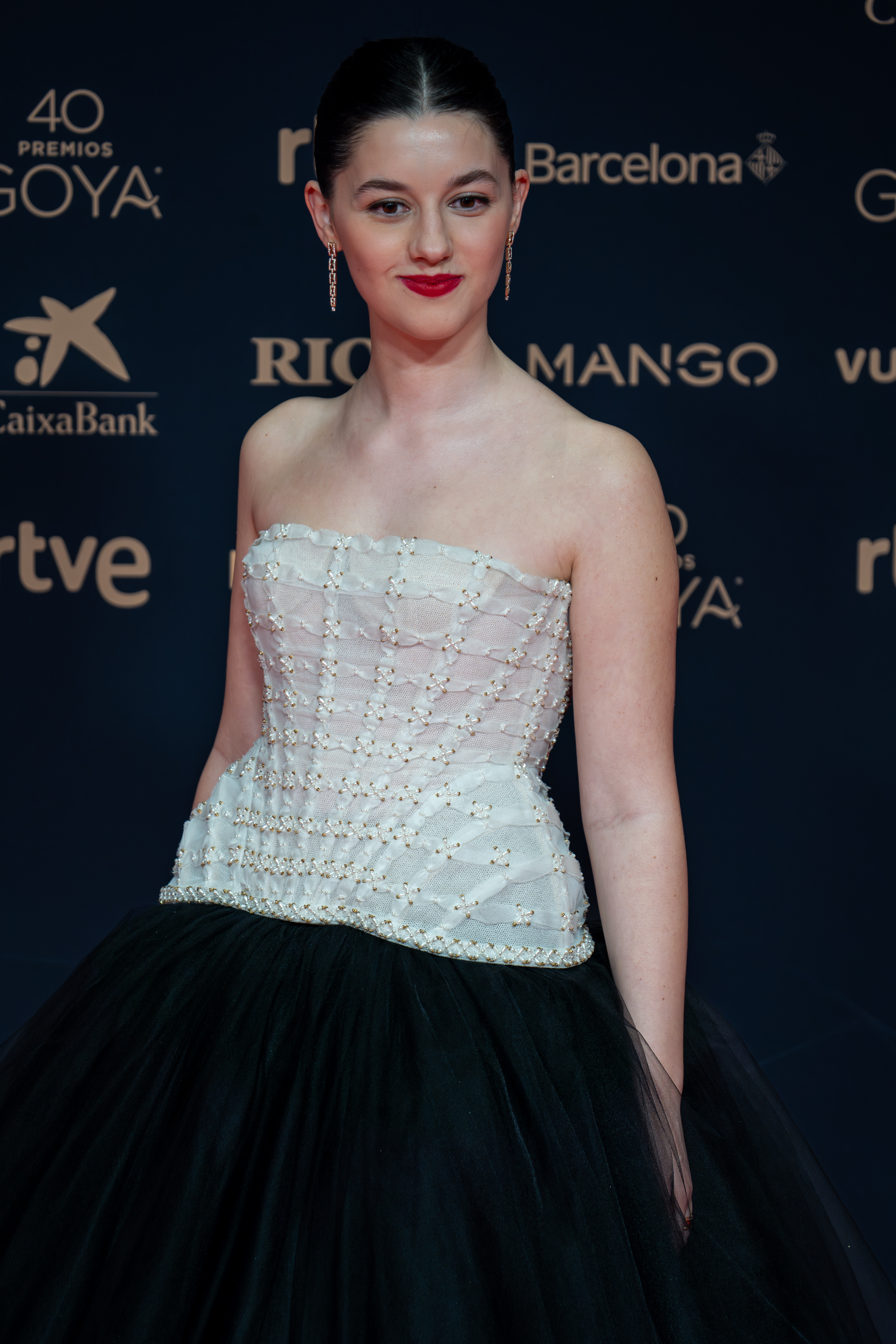
- 2026 recipient: Blanca Soroa
- Country: Ibero-America
- Presented by: Entidad de Gestión de Derechos de los Productores Audiovisuales (EGEDA); Federación Iberoamericana de Productores Cinematográficos y Audiovisuales (FIPCA)
- Currently held by: Blanca Soroa for Sundays (2026)
- Website: premiosplatino.com

The Platino Award for Best Actress (Spanish: Premio Platino a la mejor actriz/Premio Platino a la mejor interpretación femenina) is one of the Platino Awards, Ibero-America's film awards presented annually by the Entidad de Gestión de Derechos de los Productores Audiovisuales (EGEDA) and the Federación Iberoamericana de Productores Cinematográficos y Audiovisuales (FIPCA).

== History ==
It was first awarded in 2014, with Chilean actress Paulina García being the first recipient of the award, for her role as Gloria Cumplido in Gloria. Until the 7th edition in 2020, female supporting performances were included in this category. In 2021, the category for Best Supporting Actress was created.

Laia Costa became the first and only actress to win this award consecutively in 2023 and 2024 for Lullaby and Un amor, respectively. Penélope Cruz and Antonia Zegers hold the record for the most nominations in this category, each with three nods. Following closely behind are Paulina García, Laura de la Uz, Natalia Oreiro, Ilse Salas, Emma Suárez, Dolores Fonzi, Carolina Yuste, and Laia Costa, each with two nominations.

Spain holds the record of most wins in the category with three of the eight winners being Spanish actresses, followed by Brazil with three wins, while Argentina and Chile, each with two wins.

2025 winner Fernanda Torres also received a nomination for the Academy Award for Best Actress for I'm Still Here.

2022 nominee Penélope Cruz also received a nomination for the Academy Award for Best Actress for Parallel Mothers.

2019 nominee Yalitza Aparicio also received a nomination for the Academy Award for Best Actress for Roma

In the list below the winner of the award for each year is shown first, followed by the other nominees.

== Winners and nominees ==
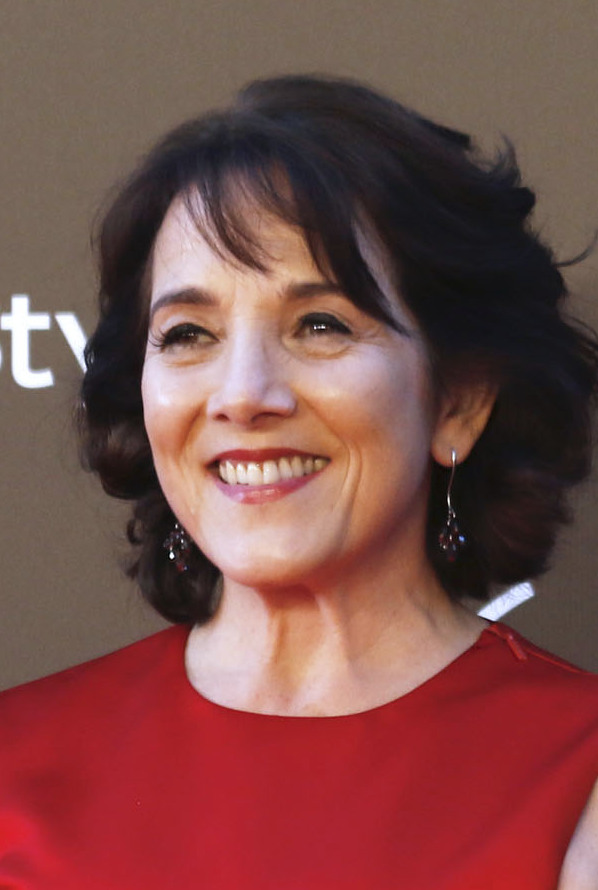
Paulina García, the first recipient of the award.

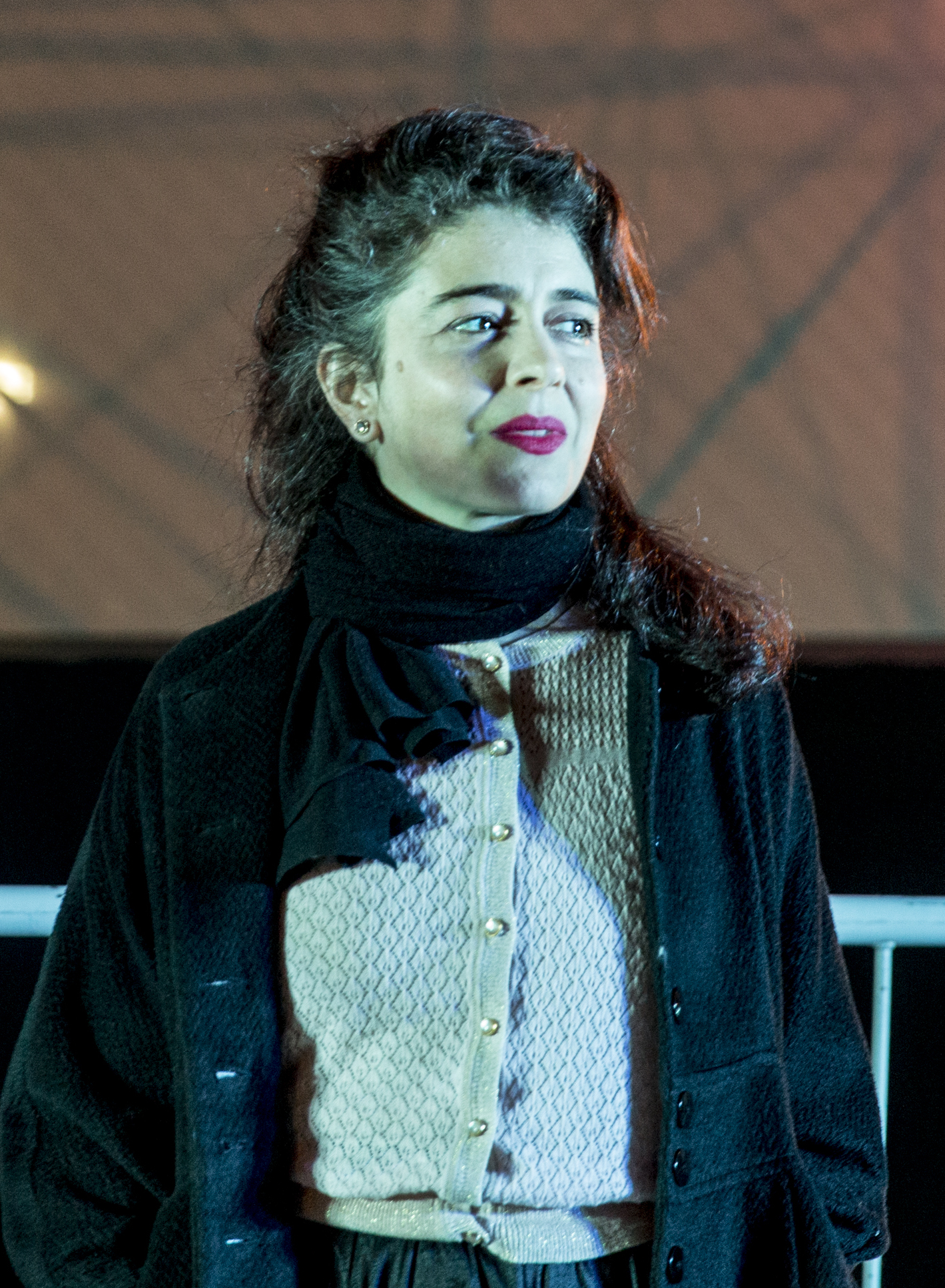
Érica Rivas won in 2015.

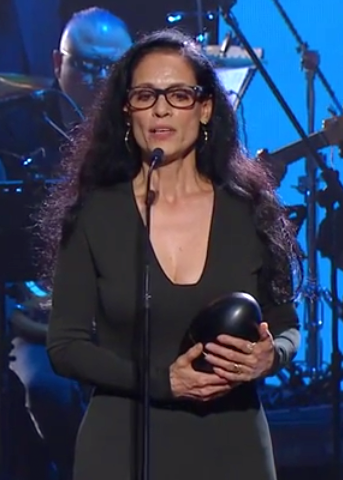
Sônia Braga won in 2017.

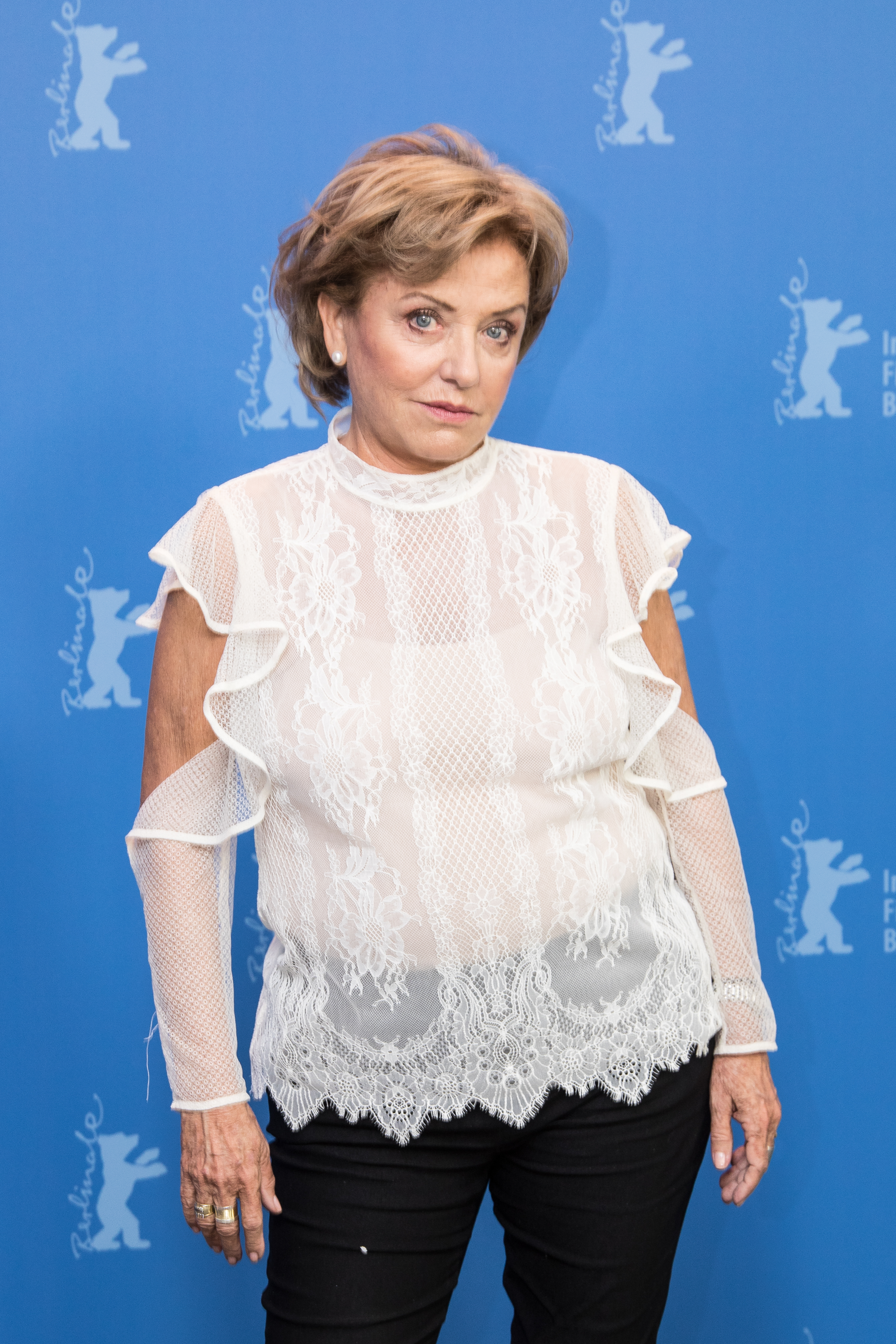
Ana Brun won in 2019.

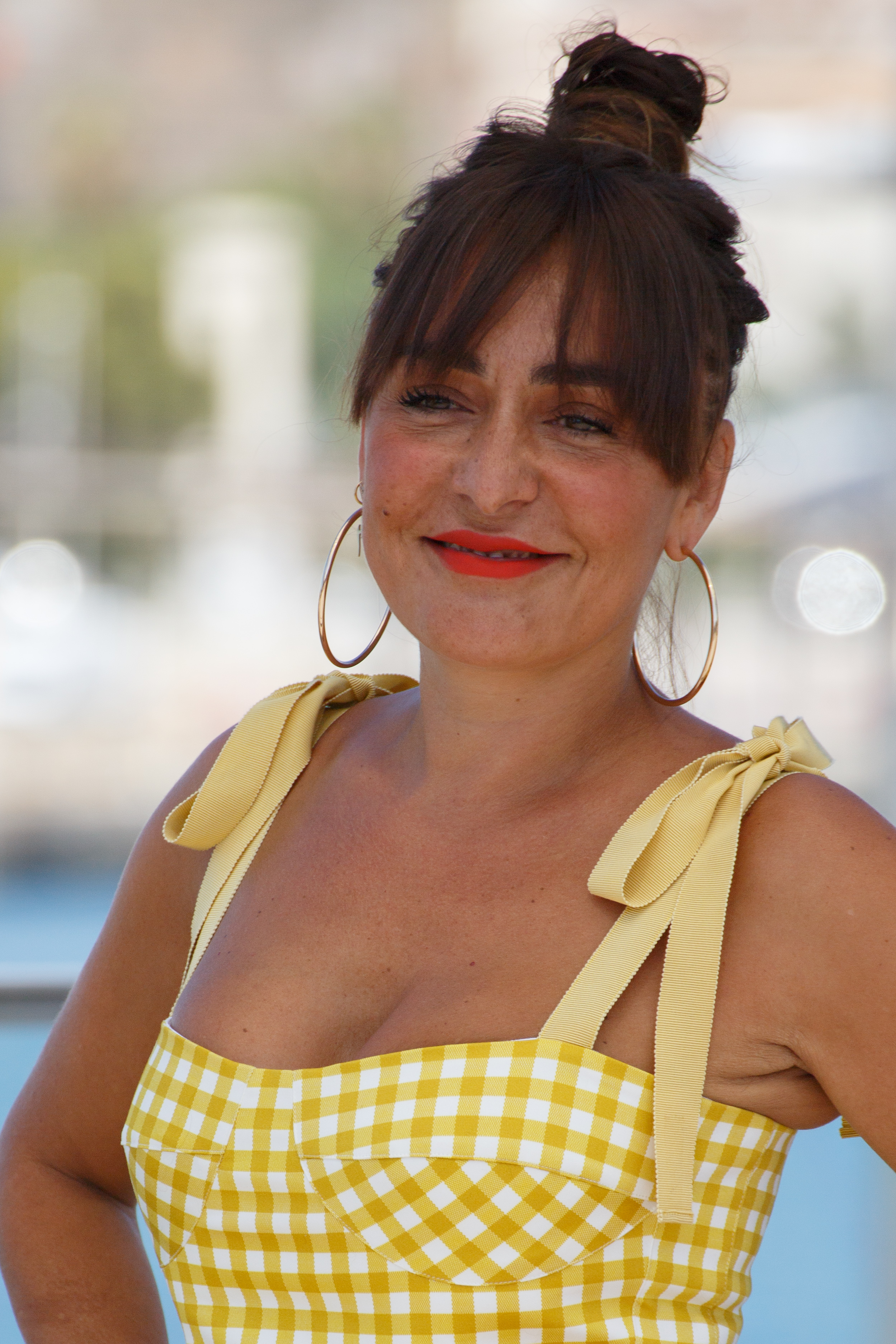
Candela Peña won in 2021.

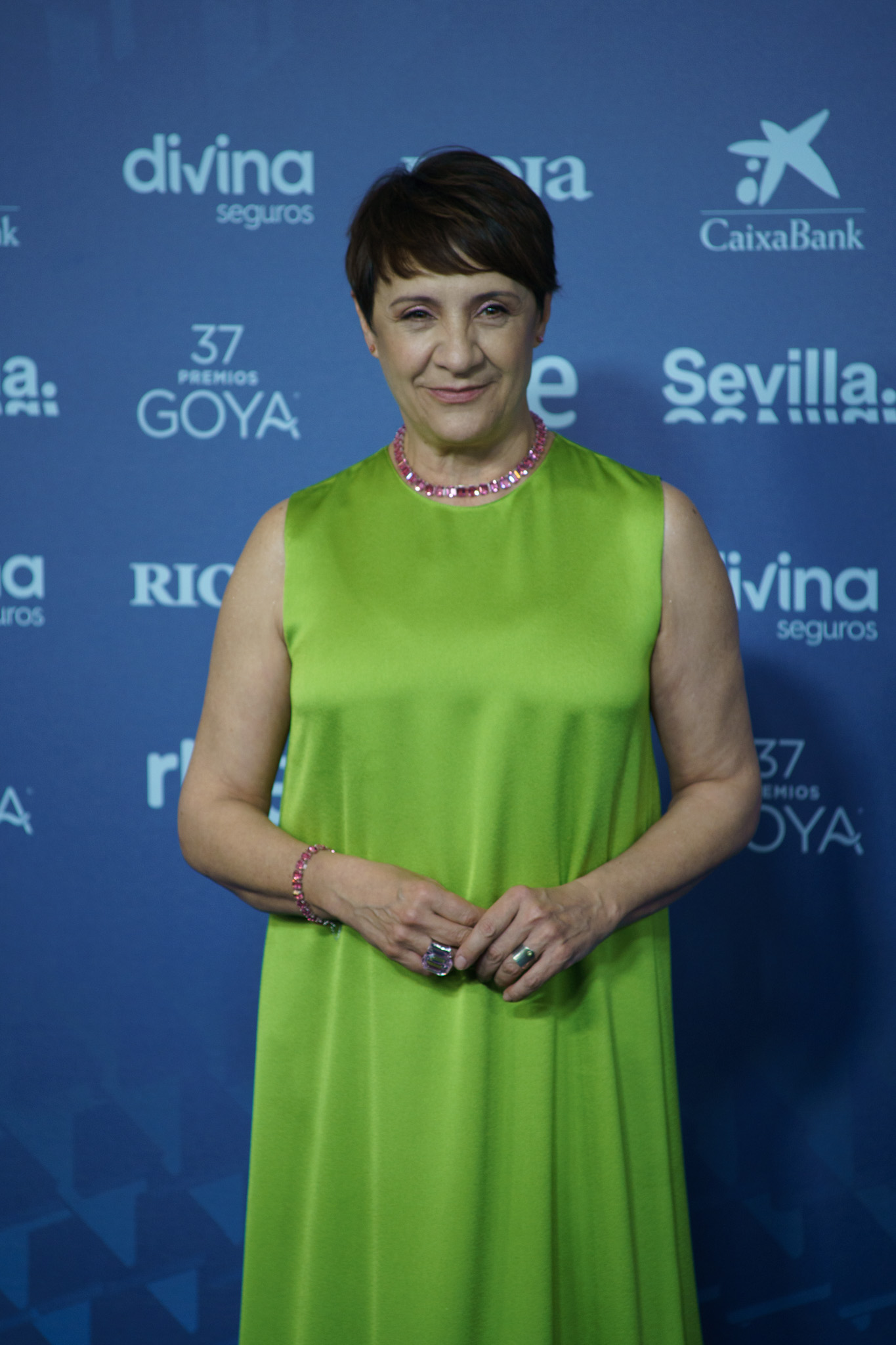
2022 winner Blanca Portillo.

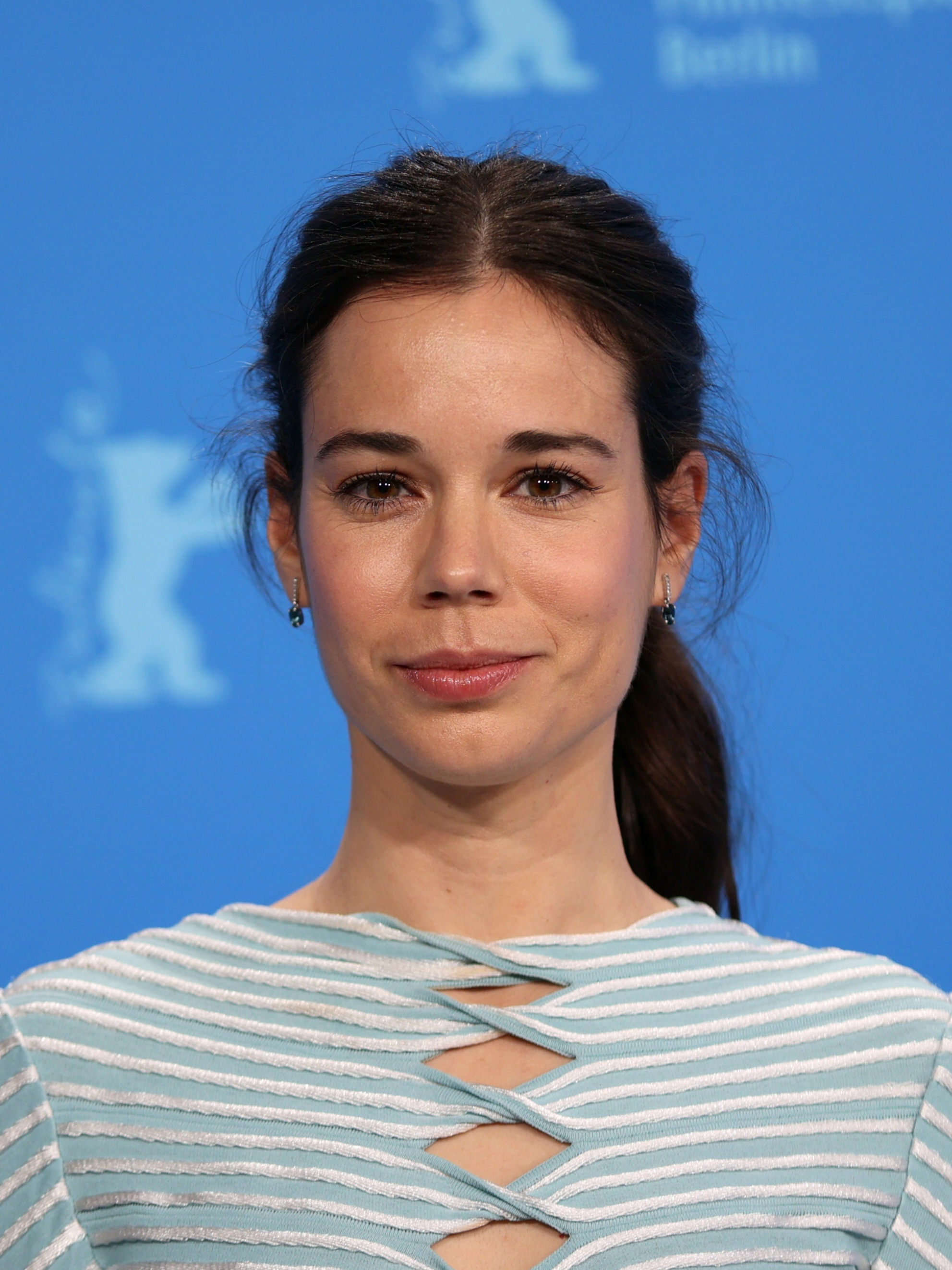
Laia Costa, winner in both 2023 and 2024, consecutively.

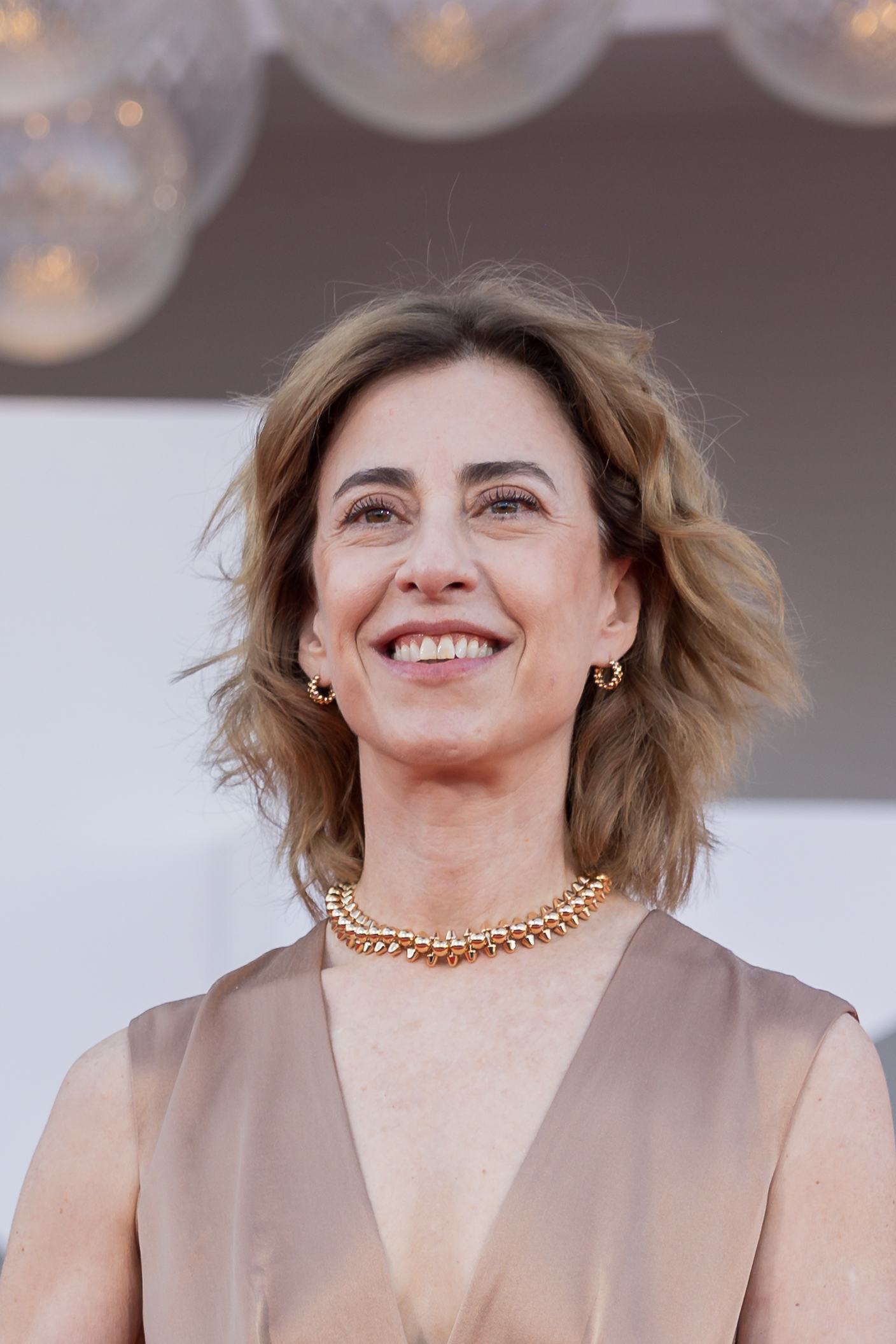
2025 winner Fernanda Torres.

=== 2010s ===
Year	Actor	Role(s)	English title	Original title
2014 (1st)	(Chile) Paulina García	Gloria Cumplido	Gloria	
2014 (1st)	(Mexico) Karen Martínez	Sara	The Golden Dream	La Jaula de Oro
2014 (1st)	(Cuba) Laura de la Uz	Ana	Ana's Movie	La película de Ana
2014 (1st)	(Spain) Marian Álvarez	Ana	Wounded	La Herida
2014 (1st)	(Dominican Republic) Nashla Bogaert	Natalie	Who's the Boss?	¿Quién manda?
2014 (1st)	(Uruguay) Natalia Oreiro	Eva	The German Doctor	Wakolda
2015 (2nd)	(Argentina) Érica Rivas	Romina	Wild Tales	Relatos Salvajes
2015 (2nd)	(United States) Geraldine Chaplin	Anne	Sand Dollars	Dólares de Arena
2015 (2nd)	(Cuba) Laura de la Uz	Rosa Elena	Vestido de novia	
2015 (2nd)	(Brazil) Leandra Leal	Rosa	A Wolf at the Door	O Lobo atrás da Porta
2015 (2nd)	(Chile) Paulina García	Ximena	Illiterate	Las Analfabetas
2015 (2nd)	(Venezuela) Samantha Castillo	Marta	Bad Hair	Pelo malo
2016 (3rd)	(Argentina) Dolores Fonzi	Paulina	Paulina	La Patota
2016 (3rd)	(Chile) Antonia Zegers	Mother Mónica	The Club	El club
2016 (3rd)	(Spain) Elena Anaya	Amanda	The Memory of Water	La memoria del agua
2016 (3rd)	(Spain) Inma Cuesta	The Bride	The Bride	La novia
2016 (3rd)	(Spain) Penélope Cruz	Magda	Ma Ma	
2017 (4th)	(Brazil) Sônia Braga	Clara	Aquarius	
2017 (4th)	(Colombia) Angie Cepeda	María del Rosario Durán	The Seed of Silence	La semilla del silencio
2017 (4th)	(Spain) Emma Suárez	Julieta Arcos	Julieta	
2017 (4th)	(Colombia) Juana Acosta	Anna	Anna	
2017 (4th)	(Uruguay) Natalia Oreiro	Gilda	I'm Gilda	Gilda, no me arrepiento de este amor
2018 (5th)	(Chile) Daniela Vega	Marina Vidal	A Fantastic Woman	Una mujer fantástica
2018 (5th)	(Chile) Antonia Zegers	Mariana	Los perros	
2018 (5th)	(Spain) Emma Suárez	Abril	April's Daughter	Las hijas de Abril
2018 (5th)	(Spain) Maribel Verdú	Carmen	Abracadabra	
2018 (5th)	(Argentina) Sofía Gala	Alanis	Alanis	
2019 (6th)
2019 (6th)	(Paraguay) Ana Brun	Chela	The Heiresses	Las herederas
2019 (6th)	(Mexico) Marina de Tavira	Sofía	Roma	
2019 (6th)	(Mexico) Yalitza Aparicio	Cleodegaria "Cleo" Gutiérrez	Roma	
2019 (6th)	(Spain) Penélope Cruz	Laura	Everybody Knows	Todos lo saben

=== 2020s ===
Year	Actor	Role(s)	English title	Original title
2020 (7th)
2020 (7th)	(Brazil) Carol Duarte	Eurídice Gusmão	The Invisible Life of Eurídice Gusmão	A Vida Invisível
2020 (7th)	(Argentina) Graciela Borges	Mara Ordaz	The Weasel's Tale	El cuento de las comadrejas
2020 (7th)	(Spain) Belén Cuesta	Rosa	The Endless Trench	La trinchera infinita
2020 (7th)	(Mexico) Ilse Salas	Sofía	The Good Girls	Las niñas bien
2021 (8th)	(Spain) Candela Peña	Rosa	Rosa's Wedding	La boda de Rosa
2021 (8th)	(Guatemala) María Mercedes Coroy	Alma	La Llorona	
2021 (8th)	(Brazil) Regina Casé	Madalena dos Santos Marins	Three Summers	Três Verões
2021 (8th)	(Argentina) Valeria Lois	Stella	Las siamesas	
2022 (9th)	(Spain) Blanca Portillo	Maixabel Lasa	Maixabel	
2022 (9th)	(Spain) Penélope Cruz	Janis Martínez Moreno	Parallel Mothers	Madres paralelas
2022 (9th)	(Spain) Ángela Molina	Charlotte	Charlotte	
2022 (9th)	(Mexico) Ilse Salas	Alicia	Plaza Catedral	
2023 (10th)	(Spain) Laia Costa	Amaia	Lullaby	Cinco lobitos
2023 (10th)	(Chile) Aline Küppenheim	Carmen	1976	
2023 (10th)	(Chile) Antonia Zegers	Ana	The Punishment	El castigo
2023 (10th)	(Spain) Laura Galán	Sara	Piggy	Cerdita
2023 (10th)	(United States) Magnolia Núñez	Yarisa	Carajita	
2024 (11th)	(Spain) Laia Costa	Nat	Un amor	
2024 (11th)	(Spain) Carolina Yuste	Conchita	Jokes & Cigarettes	Saben aquell
2024 (11th)	(Argentina) Dolores Fonzi	Blondi	Blondi	
2024 (11th)	(Cuba) Lola Amores	Yolanda	Wild Woman	La mujer salvaje
2024 (11th)	(Spain) Malena Alterio	Lucía	Something Is About to Happen	Que nadie duerma
2025 (12th)	(Brazil) Fernanda Torres	Eunice Paiva	I'm Still Here	Ainda Estou Aqui
2025 (12th)	(Spain) Carolina Yuste	Mónica / Arantxa	Undercover	La infiltrada
2025 (12th)	(Costa Rica) Sol Carballo	Woman	Memories of a Burning Body	Memorias de un cuerpo que arde
2025 (12th)	(Spain) Úrsula Corberó	Abril	Kill the Jockey	El jockey
2026 (13th)	(Spain) Blanca Soroa	Ainara	Sundays	Los domingos
2026 (13th)	(Argentina) Dolores Fonzi	Soledad Deza	Belén	
2026 (13th)	(Colombia) Natalia Reyes	Adelaida	It Would Be Night in Caracas	Aún es de noche en Caracas
2026 (13th)	(Spain) Patricia López Arnaiz	Maite	Sundays	Los domingos

== Multiple wins and nominations ==
The following actresses have received multiple Best Actress awards:

Wins	Actress
2	Laia Costa

The following actresses received multiple Best Actress nominations:

Nominations	Actress
3	Penélope Cruz
3	Antonia Zegers
3	Dolores Fonzi
2	Laia Costa
2	Paulina García
2	Laura de la Uz
2	Natalia Oreiro
2	Ilse Salas
2	Emma Suárez
2	Carolina Yuste

== See also ==
- Ariel Award for Best Actress
- Goya Award for Best Actress
- Sur Award for Best Actress
