= Persecution of LGBTQ people in Paraguay (1954–1989) =

During the Stroessner military dictatorship in Paraguay, LGBTQ+ people were persecuted by the police, captured, and tortured as part of the broader political agenda of the Paraguayan state. Similar to other targeted groups, such as communists, academics, and ethnic and religious minorities, members of the LGBTQ+ community faced state-sponsored attacks. Sexual and gender minorities were framed as a threat to society, and thus experienced verbal, physical, economic, and psychological abuse in their everyday life. Mass media (such as the major newspaper El País in Paraguay) and religious institutions such as the Catholic Church became central apparatus for the propagation of anti-LGBTQ+ propaganda and hate during the dictatorship, enforcing a climate of discrimination.

Starting as early as the 1930s, the Paraguayan government started recording, surveilling, and persecuting LGBTQ+ people, and during the Stroessner dictatorship, it significantly increased. In 1959, after the murder of Bernardo Aranda, the Stroessner government ordered the capture of gay men who might have been responsible for his death, as it was believed that a gay person might have committed the crime. The number '108' refers to the number of LGBTQ+ people (mostly gay men) captured by the state during the 1959 raids. '108' became a prominent symbol of homosexual identity in Paraguay during the dictatorship and afterward. This initial mass raid marked the beginning of increased state-sponsored persecution, surveillance, and discrimination of LGBTQ+ people.

== Historical context ==
Stronismo—the 35 year period between 1954 and 1989 of Alfredo Stroessner's reign in Paraguay—was marked by a high degree of political repression. After the 1954 military coup d'état led by Stroessner, former president Federico Chávez was forced to resign. Elections were held on July 11, 1954 with Stroessner as the only candidate. Both Stroessner and Chávez were members of the right-wing Colorado Party, and Stroessner’s initial appointment to presidential power in 1954 was marked by internal conflict within the party. As a result, many civil servants were expelled from Paraguay. Sociologist Lorena Soler has remarked that “the great majority of the people tortured and imprisoned during Stroessner’s first years belonged to the Colorado Party and the Armed Forces." In 1958, Stroessner publicly displayed a list containing the names, addresses, and job titles of public officials who were designated as political opponents within the Colorado Party—a tactic that would later be employed to expose LGBTQ+ Paraguayans.

In 2003, the Paraguayan state created the Comisión de Verdad y Justicia (Commission of Truth and Justice) to investigate human rights violations committed by the Stroessner regime. The resulting report, published in 2008, revealed that over the course of Stroessner’s regime,

20,090 people were victims of human rights violations, including 50 extrajudicial executions, 336 disappearances, and 3470 exiles. Furthermore, a total of 19,862 arbitrary arrests were made during Stronismo, no less than 18,772 (94%) of which involved some type of torture. Among the country’s adult population (an average of 1,250,000 between 1950 and 1992), one in 124 people were victims of a human rights violation. The scope of the regime of terror also encompassed the basis of economic power in Paraguay until today: land. Between 1954 and 2003, 7,851,295 ha was distributed irregularly over a total of 12,229,594 ha adjudicated during the same period. The tierras malhabidas (lands acquired through corrupt means) represented the 19.3% of the surface of the national territory (40.675.200 ha).

While the Commission of Truth and Justice reported on a variety of crimes committed by the Paraguayan state during Stronismo, it contained no information about the LGBTQ+ people captured by the police or the types of violence inflicted upon them while they were detained. As a result, no official statistical information about the political repression of LGBTQ+ Paraguayans during the last dictatorship exists, and most of the historical recollections come from individual testimonies and investigative work from independent researchers. Renata Costa's 2010 documentary film 108 (Cuchillo de Palo), for example, features interviews with queer "kuir [queer]" women and men who lived in Asunción during Stronismo which recount instances of detainment and torture.

Within the period of the Dictatorship (1954-1989), as well as before the start of it, gender and sexual minorities were in a clandestine state due to the lack of social and legal support. The dictatorship heightened the social exclusion of LGBTQ+, trans/travesti people, in particular, would encounter housing and job discrimination, having to do mostly sex work. During the day and night, trans/travesti people would have to hide from the police, and they would be routinely taken to police stations for interrogation. Compared to gay men, there is less historical data on lesbian women; they encountered invisibilization for being women, as well as other forms of abuse and violence during the dictatorship.

== Persecution and detention of LGBTQ+ people ==
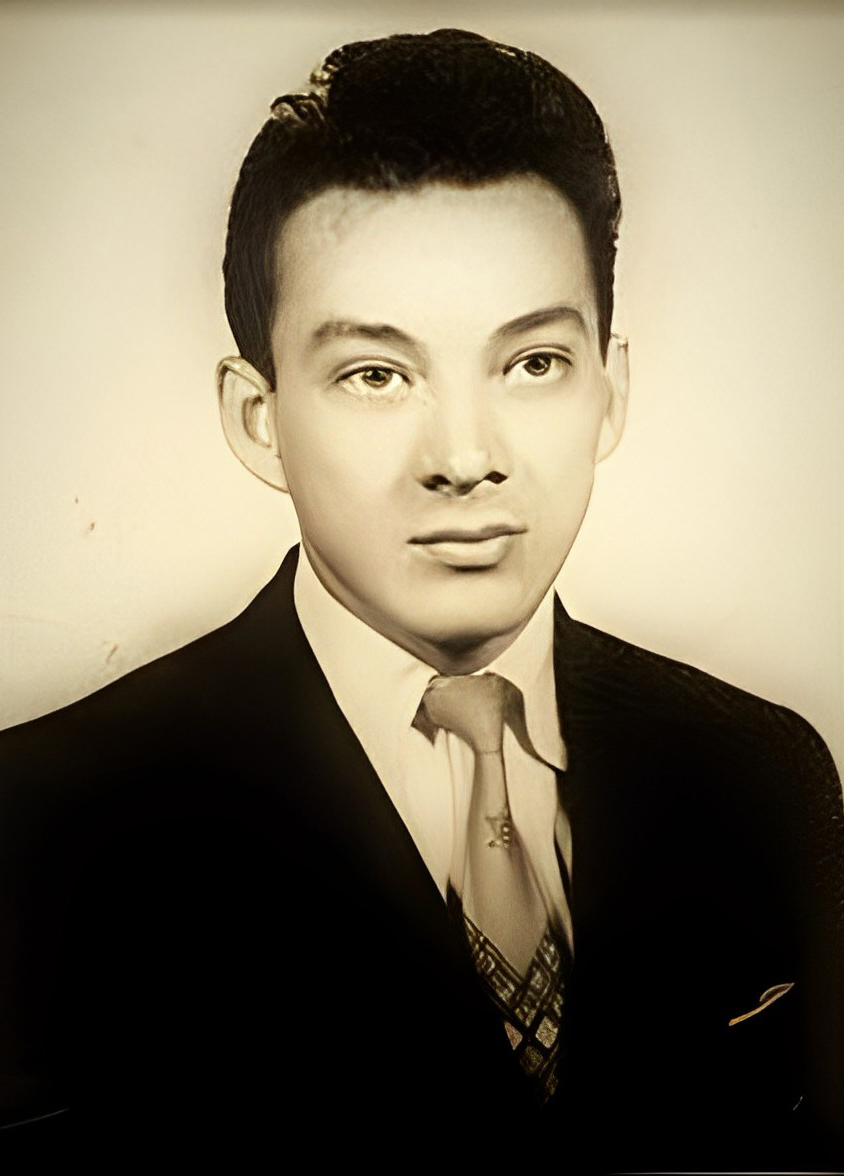
Picture of Bernardo Aranda taken by the Brazilian consulate in Asunción, Paraguay. June 11, 1959.

=== The Bernardo Aranda Case (1959) ===
During the night of the 1st of September 1959, the body of Bernardo Aranda was found, fully burned, in his home. At 25 years of age, he was known for working as a radio speaker in Asunción, Paraguay. As multiple editions of El País stated, his murder was framed as a "murder of passion." While, at the time of his death, he had a girlfriend, the police suspected Aranda could be gay, and a day after his death, they launched an operation to capture supposedly homosexual men. During the first days of this raid, the media (complicit and coerced by the state) stated that there were no detainees, which was proved to be false. By September 12, it was made public that 108 people of "dubious moral behavior" were detained and interrogated by the police, many of whom later spoke about being tortured and sexually assaulted by the police. The usage of torture, as well as sexual assault, were regular interrogation techniques employed by the police and other state officials, to gain information, but also to humiliate those interrogated. Physical and psychological abuse in detention centers was common in Paraguay and in other countries that took part in Operation Condor.

The murder of Bernardo Aranda served as an excuse to persecute an organized attack against the members of the LGBTQ+ community. They created a rationale for the persecution and capture of LGBTQ+ people, particularly gay men, based on morality, in which presumed members of the community were seen as immoral and dangerous to society. During the raid of September 12, 108 people were captured, a number with which gender and sexual minorities will be associated to the present in Paraguay.

=== The role of mass media ===
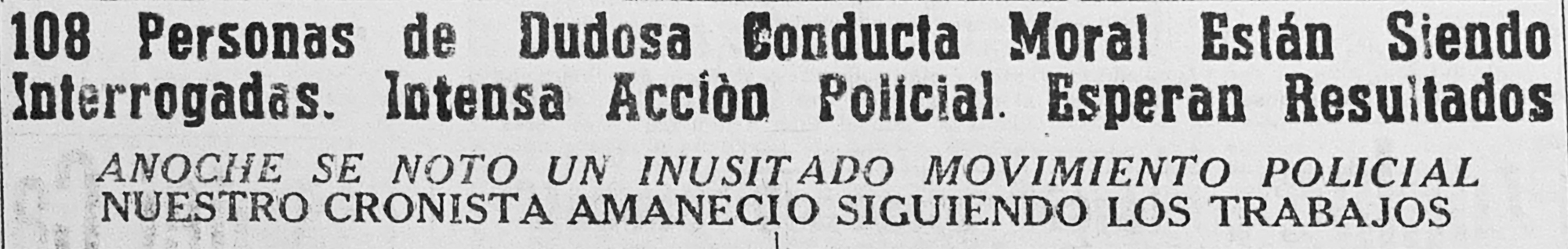
Newspaper Header. The name 108 is used for the first time. Published originally by the newspaper El País, the 12th of September 1959

Mass Media, such as El País, and the Revista Ñandé, were the main newspapers and outlets addressing the murder of Aranda, as well as the 108 morally dubious people. They were reporting about the issue from an active homophobic stand, contributing to a public image and narrative of sexual and gender minorities as dangerous and immoral. Part of their work includes publishing articles from Catholic organizations that state that homosexuals, or as they would refer to them, "deviants," have a secret organization that is recruiting minors to have sex with them. Being part of the LGBTQ+ community was associated with forms of organized crime. The number '108' became a durable and contested symbol for homosexuality in Paraguay. Its first usage to denote an amoral, abject, homosexual man can be traced to a political cartoon published by the Revista Ñandé, a fortnightly magazine which published humorous propaganda in line with the Colorado Party. On one occasion, the magazine published a cartoon depicting a procession of men with emphasized buttocks, each with the number 108 written across their backs, directed by police wielding clubs. Those people who were part or associated with the number 108 became both subjects of laughter and discrimination. The text “108 y 1 quemado” ("108 and 1 burned") was prominently displayed in the magazine. They would display effeminate men depicted in jail with a "108" shirt, or shown going back to attack an ex with gasoline, which was the method used to murder Aranda. These media outlets perpetuated stereotyped images, drawings, and stories depicting gay men and other "immoral" members of society, building and contributing to the everyday, symbolic, and physical violence against LGBTQ+ people.

=== An Immoral's Letter ("La Carta De Un Amoral") ===
On the 30th of September 1959, in response to the continuous defamation and attacks against LGBTQ+ people, an anonymous writer sent a letter to the Paraguayan newspaper El País's director, Leopoldo Ramos Giménez. This letter states:

«Dear Director: To El PAÍS, it was fair to baptize with the name of "social scourge" a big and respectable number of people, because they, motivated by pleasure, without offending anyone else, in moderation and silence, just like healthy intimate activities. This is different from the other erratic pleasures that are also born in a cultured society that has multiple public scandals. We believe that El PAÍS is wrong, maybe because it is easier to hurt humans than to reflect socially, humanly, and philosophically. We follow a vocation that is as old as humanity, and in this era of human rights, no one can deny us the right to be ourselves, of our embodied self, what we want, without disturbing anyone who does not do the same.

Moralists from El País are wrong, because, in this matter, there is no collective morality, but rather an individual morality, and we are individualists by philosophical principle. If you all are persistent with this error, you will lose time, and we will learn nothing »

Anonymous writer, published in El País, September 30th, 1959

Spanish Original Version:

«Señor Director:

A El PAÍS le ha parecido justo bautizar con el nombre de “lacra social” a un grande y respetable número de personas honradas, que son tales, porque respecto a sus vidas hacen de ella un motivo moderado de placer, sin ofender a los demás, tan moderado, y silencioso, como corresponde a las sanas actividades íntimas, a diferencia de los placeres desenfrenados que también en el seno de la sociedad llamada culta suelen desembocar en públicos escándalos. Nosotros creemos que EL PAIS se equivoca fundamentalmente, tal vez porque en vez de reflexionar social, humana y filosóficamente, le resulte más fácil usar epítetos para lastimar a personas dignas de toda consideración. Nosotros seguimos una vocación que es tan antigua como la propia humanidad, y en este siglo de consagración de todos los derechos humanos, nadie puede negarnos el derecho de hacer de nosotros mismos, de nuestro continente físico, lo que queremos, sin incomodar a los otros que no quieran hacer lo mismo.

Los moralistas de EL PAÍS están errados, porque en esta materia no existe moral colectiva, sino moral individual, y nosotros somos individualistas por principios filosóficos. Si Uds. persisten en el error, perderán tiempo, y nosotros no perdemos nada». Anónimo.

This letter became a symbol of resistance, which even to this date LGBTQ+ collectives celebrate as a form of activism against the Dictatorship's violence.

=== The case of Mario Luis Palmieri ===
On the 22nd of March 1982, Mario Luis Palmieri was kidnapped by someone who called his school and pretended to be his father for him to leave early. Six days later, the 14-year-old Palmieri boy was found dead. Reinaldo Chamorro Chávez was the only person found guilty of this crime. There are multiple theories, but Chávez never spoke about it.

The death of Palmieri led to a major persecution of LGBTQ+ people, predominantly gay men, as police suspected that this was a "crime of passion" committed by a gay man. They compiled a list with over six hundred gay men, supposedly gay men, effeminate, as well as other gender and sexual minorities that they thought could have been involved. This list provided information that aided the massive persecution, interrogation, and torture of many of the people in the list (though there are no specific numbers of how many were actually taken to a detention center. This second massive police campaign led to a deepening of the social and economic violence all members of the LGBTQ+ community were encountering, particularly after the original 108 captured in 1959. Within the raid of 1982, Pedro Costa was taken, interrogated, and tortured. Years later he was found dead in his house. Costa's story shows up in the documentary 108/Cuchillo de Palo (2010), in which Renate, Costa's niece and film director, sets out to find out what happened to her uncle.

== Effects of Persecution ==
The persecution of homosexuality resulted in the retreat of many gay, lesbian, and transgender people to social lives characterized by secrecy and self-censorship. If someone was exposed as a homosexual, it could mean expulsion from their family, losing their job, or being detained and tortured by the state police. As a result, queer sociality has been largely restricted to small, secret gatherings and a few public spaces and venues occupied during the night. Lawyer and human rights activist Erwing Szokol has noted that,

In the final years of the dictatorship in Asunción, there were also places dedicated to nighttime recreation where many of the attendees were considered homosexual. These regular haunts were known to the authorities, since with the sophisticated intelligence system, it was impossible to carry out any activity without it coming to their attention. In times of crisis, the police would raid these gatherings to conduct violent raids and arbitrary arrests.

In the years following the case of Bernardo Aranda, ‘108’ disappeared from ordinary life and usage as its meaning became associated with, as one state report put it, “the effeminate, unmanly, or ‘ku otro’ [a Yopará term for homosexuality]." In Asuncion, the number has disappeared from street addresses, license plates, and phone numbers.

=== '108' Activism re-appropiation ===
‘108’ has also been subject to re-appropriation and resignification. For example, the Mansión 108 social collective formed in 2013 to be a “place for kuir [queer] ideas in Asunción." Among other initiatives, the collective published documents related to the caso 108 in a blog called 108 Memorias. They also organized a “memory tour” at the 2013 Pride March in Asunción in which a drag queen dressed as a state policeman toured historical sites related to the caso 108 “such as police stations where homosexual men were detained, Bernardo Aranda’s house, and the Antequera Stairs, a meeting place between various travestis and homosexual individuals [met] during the dictatorship."

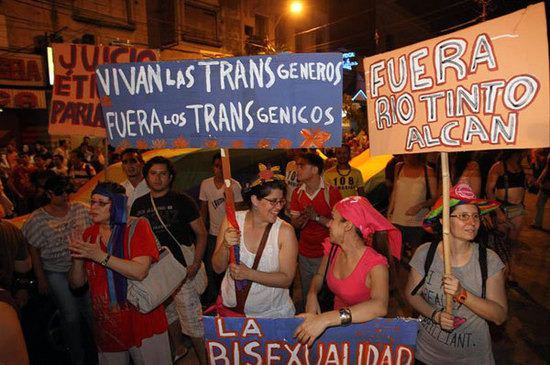
People participating in the 2013 Pride March in Asunción.

Juliana Quintana, a journalist specializing in human rights, gender, and science coverage, has written that "108 today is no longer a 'cursed number.' It is a symbol of struggle and a tribute to the victims who suffered repression, torture, exile and death because of their sexual orientation and gender identity."

Erwing Augsten Szokol, an activist, lawyer and advocate for LGBTQ+ rights in Paraguay, was one of the main researchers and writers for "Ficha Técnica. 108. Ciento Ocho," the main research article on the persecution and discrimination against queer and trans people during the dictatorship. He identifies as "108," and not gay or homosexual, and had reclaimed the word, and what it means for him. Additionally, he affirms that while there is not much proof on why they were taking LGBTQ+ people, he states that it could be also because they were involved in anti-fascist protest and movement. For him that meant that being a '108,' is not only a term of homosexual, but rather a political active gender and/or sexual minority.

== See also ==
- Homintern conspiracy theory
- Lesbians in Francoist Spain
- Social cleansing
