= Ana Ivanova =

Paraguayan actress

- in 2018
- Born: 25 June 1973
- Died: 17 March 2025 (aged 51)
- Occupation: actor

Ana Ivanova (25 June 1973 – 17 March 2025) was a Paraguayan actress. After she died in 2025 she was honoured in Paraguay's parliament.

== Life ==
Ivanova was born in 1973 and she began acting in 1999. She had awards for her parts in the short films "Recycled Life' and 'Recoleta'. However she came to notice after she played Angy in the film The Heiresses (Las Herederas) which was well received at the Berlin Film Festival in 2018.

At the San Sebastian festival she and her dress were lauded. She was compared to Jennifer Lopez and she made the covers of two magazines. The film was judged the best LGBT film from Latin America at the San Sebastian festival. The film and the main star Ana Brun won several awards and Ivanova was judged Best Actress in 2018 at the 46th Gramado International Film Festival in Brazil.

She died in 2025, aged 51, after being diagnosed with lung cancer. She had made seven films and appeared in 40 short films. She was honoured after she died in the Paraguayan parliament where she was made a "Master of Arts". The award was made by the Cultural Center of the Republic following a petition and campaign by her friends, family and followers. The award was presented to her mother.

The 16th European Film Festival was held in Paraguay's capital Asunción in 2025 and film cycle was dedicated to Ivanova's memory.
