= Andrea Quattrocchi =

Paraguayan actress and ballerina

- Born: Andrea Quattrocchi Rivarola; March 23, 1989 (age 36); Asunción, Paraguay
- Occupations: Actress; Ballerina
- Years active: 2008 - present

Andrea Quattrocchi Rivarola (born 23 March 1989) is a Paraguayan actress and ballerina, famous for her roles on Paraguayan television and participation in the reality TV dancing competition Baila Conmigo Paraguay. She currently lives in Asunción, Paraguay.

== Career ==
In 2008 she received acclaim for her part as Ramonita, a maid, in Papá del corazón. In 2009 she was in De mil amores, where her character was a blind woman called Lucia. In 2010 she was in La doña, playing the seductress and villain, Beatriz.

On 14 October 2010 she was broadcast in the reality show Baila Conmigo Paraguay (Dance with me, Paraguay), in which she competed as a celebrity contestant. She was a favourite on account of her skill at dancing and reached the final, competing against the singer Nadia "La Kchorra" Portillo, who defeated her for first place. Initially it was reported that Quattrocchi was the winner, but later it was reported that there had been a mistake tallying the votes and that La Kchorra was actually the winner. This remains controversial, with many considering the correction to have been an injustice on the part of the programme.

At the beginning of 2011, Quattrocchi moved to Buenos Aires, Argentina, where she was selected from among 400 applicants for a scholarship to study musical comedy at the school of the Argentine ballet dancer Julio Bocca. She made her debut on the Buenos Airesian stage in Feizbuk Tours, directed by the Argentine director Jose Maria Muscari. She received her debut on Argentine television from recognised Argentine director Juan Jose Campanella, on the El hombre de tu vida, produced by Telefe. On this show Quattrocchi played the part of Nidia in the 2012 season.

In 2014 she participated in the dancing programme Baila Conmigo Paraguay 2014, forming a pair with Jorge Moliniers who had participated in Bailando 2012 and Bailando 2014 on the Argentine series, Showmatch.

== Filmography ==
=== Television ===
Year	Programme	Role	Notes
2014	Baila conmigo Paraguay 2014	Herself	Contestant
2012	El hombre de tu vida	Nidia	Guest role
2010	La doña	Beatriz Andrea Ramirez Velazco	Main role and antagonist
2010	Baila conmigo Paraguay 2010	Herself	Contestant
2009	De mil amores	Lucia	Supporting role
2008	Papá del corazón	Ramonita	Supporting role

=== Films ===
Year	Title	Role	Notes
2010	Semana capital	Sofia	
2014	Luna de Cigarras	Sandra	
2015	Paulina	-	
2018	The Last Runway	Betty Jara	
2023	The Apartment	Her	
2023	The Last Runway 2, Commando Yaguarete	Betty Jara	
