= The Heiresses (2018 film) =

2018 film by Marcelo Martinessi

- Film poster
- Spanish: Las herederas
- Directed by: Marcelo Martinessi
- Written by: Marcelo Martinessi
- Produced by: Sebastián Peña Escobar; Marcelo Martinessi
- Starring: Ana Brun; Margarita Irún; Ana Ivanova
- Cinematography: Luis Armando Arteaga
- Edited by: Fernando Epstein
- Distributed by: Luxbox
- Release dates: 16 February 2018 (Berlin); 4 May 2018 (Paraguay)
- Running time: 95 minutes
- Countries: Paraguay; Uruguay; Germany; Brazil; Norway; France
- Language: Spanish

The Heiresses (Spanish: Las herederas) is a 2018 drama film written and directed by Marcelo Martinessi. Set in contemporary Asunción, Paraguay, it tells the story of two women who have lived together for 30 years in an inherited house but are running out of money. When one is imprisoned for attempted fraud, the other has to readjust her life.

The film is a co-production of Paraguay, Uruguay, Germany, Brazil, Norway and France. It was selected to compete for the Golden Bear at the 68th Berlin International Film Festival, where lead actress Ana Brun won the Silver Bear for Best Actress and Martinessi won the Alfred Bauer Prize.

== Plot ==
Chela and Chiquita have been a couple for over 30 years but their funds are running out. They start selling the furniture and Chela, fearing disgrace, refuses money from friends. When Chiquita gets notice to report to the city jail, charged with seeking a loan fraudulently, Chela is suddenly on her own. Telling people Chiquita has gone for a stay by the sea, she carries on selling the house contents. Picuta, an elderly lady living close by, asks if Chela will drive her to visit friends who meet for cards and gossip. It was Chiquita who drove their venerable Mercedes, since Chela has no licence, but she obliges her neighbour, who forces cash on her to pay for the fuel. This develops into an informal taxi service for Picuta's friends.

On one of her trips meets the younger vivacious Angy, who begs her to drive out on the motorway to Itauguá, where her mother is being treated. Though Chela has never been on a motorway, she makes the effort. Angy takes an interest in the lonely older woman, telling her stories of her very varied love life. But the friendship takes a chill when Angy jumps out of the car to join a passing boyfriend. Chela also worries that Chiquita in the women's prison is too interested in the other inmates.

Chauffeuring Picuta and some of her friends to a funeral, she meets Angy again and late that night the two go back to Chela's house to share a bottle of wine. When Angy offers herself, Chela hides in the toilet. Emerging later to find Angy gone, she boozily drives round the darkened city looking for her. A few days later Chiquita is released, but Chela is disoriented by the stresses she has been under and the sudden changes she has faced. In the morning Chiquita finds both Chela and the car missing.

== Cast ==
- Ana Brun as Chela
- Margarita Irún as Chiquita
- Ana Ivanova as Angy
- María Martins as Pituca
- Alicia Guerra as Carmela
- Yverá Zayas as a Singer

== Accolades ==
It was selected to compete for the Golden Bear in the main competition section at the 68th Berlin International Film Festival. At Berlin Ana Brun won the Silver Bear for Best Actress and Marcelo Martinessi won the Silver Bear 'Alfred Bauer' award to a film that 'opens new perspectives on cinematic art'. The film was also selected as the Paraguayan entry for the Best Foreign Language Film at the 91st Academy Awards, for the Best Iberoamerican Film at the 33rd Goya Awards, and for the Best Iberoamerican Film at the 61st Ariel Awards. It also won a Best Directing Award at the 2019 Premios Fenix and received the Best Actress and Best First Film Awards at the 2019 Premios Platino.

Year	Award	Category	Recipient	Result
2018	Teddy Awards	Readers' Award	Marcelo Martinessi	Won
2018	Berlin International Film Festival	Silver Bear for Best Actress	Ana Brun	Won
2018	Berlin International Film Festival	Alfred Bauer Prize (Silver Bear)	Marcelo Martinessi	Won
2018	Berlin International Film Festival	FIPRESCI	Marcelo Martinessi	Won
2018	Berlin International Film Festival	Giuseppe Becce	Marcelo Martinessi	Won
2018	Sydney Film Festival	Sydney Film Prize	Marcelo Martinessi	Won
2018	Fénix Awards	Best Film	Marcelo Martinessi	Nominated
2018	Fénix Awards	Best Director	Marcelo Martinessi	Won
2018	Fénix Awards	Best Screenplay	Marcelo Martinessi	Nominated
2018	Fénix Awards	Best Debut Film	Marcelo Martinessi	Won
2018	Fénix Awards	Best Cinematography	Luis Armando Arteaga	Nominated
2018	Fénix Awards	Best Art Direction	Carlo Spatuzza	Nominated
2018	Fénix Awards	Best Sound	Daniel Turini, Fernando Henna, Rafael Álvarez, Ariel Hernique	Nominated
2018	Cartagena Film Festival	Best Director	Marcelo Martinessi	Won
2018	Cartagena Film Festival	FIPRESCI	Marcelo Martinessi	Won
2018	Transilvania International Film Festival	Transilvania Trophy	Marcelo Martinessi	Won
2019	Platino Awards	Best Actress	Ana Brun	Won
2019	Platino Awards	Best Screenplay	Marcelo Martinessi	Nominated
2019	Platino Awards	Best Ibero-American First Film	Marcelo Martinessi	Won
2019	Platino Awards	Film and Education Values	Marcelo Martinessi	Nominated
2019	Platino Awards	Best Cinematography	Luis Armando Arteaga	Nominated
2020	GLAAD Media Awards	Outstanding Film – Limited Release	The Heiresses	Nominated

== Critical reception ==
On Metacritic, the film has a weighted average score of 77 out of 100, based on 12 critics, indicating "generally favorable reviews".

On review aggregator Rotten Tomatoes, The Heiresses holds an approval rating of 98% based on 80 reviews, with an average rating of 7.8/10. The website's critical consensus reads, "Led by a standout performance from Ana Brun, The Heiresses takes a thoroughly compelling look at lives little explored by mainstream cinema."

== See also ==
- List of submissions to the 91st Academy Awards for Best Foreign Language Film
- List of Paraguayan submissions for the Academy Award for Best Foreign Language Film
