= María Gloria Bobadilla =

Paraguayan lawyer

María Gloria Bobadilla Granada is a Paraguayan lawyer. She is president of the Paraguayan Association of Female Lawyers (ADAP).

== Career ==
In 1993 María Gloria Bobadilla brought a case before the Paraguayan Civil Court on behalf of a Paraguayan living in Italy, Ramón Fidel, who had undergone gender reassignment surgery and wanted to be officially registered as a woman and not as a man. Fidel died in a traffic accident before the case could be decided. In 2008, Bobadilla called for the law to be clarified:

The American Declaration of the Rights and Duties of Man, as well as the Pact of San José, the jurisprudence of the European Court and the provisions of our National Constitution on the right to life and the expression of personality, we indicate that homosexuals and transsexuals cannot be discriminated, under any circumstances, or marginalized. They are human beings, just like any heterosexual being. They suffer a lot with their natural gender dysfunction or with sex change operations, risking their lives, and then continue to explain over and over again, in each country where they live, their situation, torturing them because they are not what they appear.

In 2015 Bobadilla called for the consideration of new measures, including ankle monitors and chemical castration, to combat rape and other sexual crimes in Paraguay.

Bobadilla was elected ADAP (Asociación de Abogadas Paraguayas) president in April 2019. In 2020 she objected to new plans announced by the Supreme Court of Justice governing the re-registration of lawyers, arguing that re-registration should be free. In July 2021 ADAP publicly rebuked Roberto Gonsález, a deputy and former president of the Council of Magistrates, for having referred to critics of the National Republican Association as "whores with scapulars". Bobadilla criticized the misogynist violence of González's language:

Politicians must learn to defend positions without violating fundamental rights. A macho culture in parliament should not be tolerated and gender identity protection enforced. It is a way of reducing, or preventing or restricting a woman politician in her functions.
