= Morgue (film) =

2019 film directed by Hugo Cardozo

- Film poster
- Directed by: Hugo Cardozo
- Written by: Hugo Cardozo
- Produced by: Hugo Cardozo
- Cinematography: Blas Guerrero
- Release date: August 22, 2019
- Running time: 81 minutes
- Country: Paraguay
- Languages: Spanish; Guarani

Morgue is a 2019 Paraguayan horror thriller film written, produced and directed by Hugo Cardozo.

The film was released on August 22, 2019, being the most watched film of the week with 23,000 tickets sold.

== Plot ==
The story is about private security guard Diego Martínez, who, while working the nightshift in the Regional Hospital of Encarnación, gets locked inside the morgue and experiences a series of haunting paranormal events.

According to the director and screenwriter, Hugo Cardozo, the film is based on real events.

== Cast ==
- Pablo Martínez
- Willi Villalba
- Maria del Mar Fernández
- Abel Martínez
- Aldo Von Knobloch
- Raúl Rotela
- Francisco Ayala

== Box office ==
Morgue opened to a first week box office selling 23,000 tickets in 36 theaters. It stayed at number one for two consecutive weeks.
