= La última obra =

- Theatrical release poster
- Directed by: Héctor Duarte
- Written by: Héctor Duarte; Mauricio Martínez; Sergio Colmán
- Produced by: Ana Arza; Héctor Duarte; Mariana Pineda
- Starring: Mauricio Martínez
- Cinematography: Diego de Garay
- Music by: Derlis A. González
- Production company: Oima Films
- Release date: March 23, 2023
- Running time: 102 minutes
- Country: Paraguay
- Language: Spanish

La última obra (lit. 'The last Work') is a 2023 Paraguayan thriller film directed and co-produced by Héctor Duarte (in his directorial debut) who co-wrote the script with Mauricio Martínez and Sergio Colmán. It stars Martínez accompanied with Gina Benedetti, Sandra “Kúku” Flecha, Rodrigo Caballero, Jimmy Rojas and Ever Enciso. It is about a successful businessman who will have to face his past after a tragic event. It premiered on March 23, 2023 in Paraguayan theaters.

== Synopsis ==
Édgar Chamorro is desperate to pay off the multiple debts of his business and correct his bad decisions. In addition, due to the weight of a love breakup, he drowns his sorrows in alcohol and spends his last guaraníes on a play in a modest theater. Some time later, he becomes a successful businessman, but everything will change when a tragedy strikes and he is forced to face his past.

== Cast ==
The actors participating in this film are:

- Mauricio Martínez as Édgar Chamorro
- Gina Benedetti as Martina
- Sandra “Kúku” Flecha as Yerutí
- Rodrigo Caballero as Édgar Chamorro's Best Friend
- Jimmy Rojas as Chamorro
- Borja García-Enríquez as Mr. Pimentel
- Ever Enciso
