= The Last Runway 2, Commando Yaguarete =

- Theatrical release poster
- Directed by: Armando Aquino; Mauricio Rial
- Written by: Andrés Gelós; Natacha Caravia; Alejandro Cabral Theobald
- Produced by: Dani Da Rosa; Osvaldo Gane Salúm; Fabrizio Caligaris; José María Agüero
- Starring: Andrea Quattrocchi; Lali González
- Cinematography: Nahuel Varela
- Edited by: Maiu Fernandez; Andrea Gandolfo
- Music by: Juan Blas Caballero
- Production company: Hei Films
- Release date: August 31, 2023
- Running time: 92 minutes
- Country: Paraguay
- Language: Spanish

The Last Runway 2, Commando Yaguarete (Spanish: Leal 2, Comando Yaguareté, lit. 'Leal 2, Yaguareté Command') is a 2023 Paraguayan action film directed by Armando Aquino & Mauricio Rial and written by Andrés Gelós, Natacha Caravia & Alejandro Cabral Theobald. It is a sequel to the 2018 film The Last Runway. Starring Andrea Quattrocchi and Lali González. It premiered on August 31, 2023, in Paraguayan theaters.

It was selected as the Paraguayan entry for the Best International Feature Film at the 96th Academy Awards.

== Synopsis ==
Betty Jara, a seasoned former member of the Senad and now the head of investigations under the Ministry of the Interior, faces a critical situation when one of her agents is abducted by a criminal group. To rescue him, Betty seeks assistance from the new head of the Senad, Graciela Agüero, who is responsible for negotiating the agent's release in exchange for one of her own. Ruthless, Betty brings together the Yaguareté Command to execute a risky operation that becomes increasingly difficult when they realize that they are not just fighting a drug trafficking network.

== Cast ==
- Andrea Quattrocchi as Betty Jara
- Lali González as Graciela Agüero
- Renato Gómez as Basilio Aldana
- Bruno Sosa Bofinger as Dante Moreira
- Bruno Sosa as Dante
- Félix Medina as Agent Ibáñez
- Amambay Narváez as Agent Cynthia
- Germano Holanda as Caco
- Ana Maria Imizcoz as Elvira
- Mauricio A. Jortack as Roberto 'Curepa Corazón' Vallejos
- Rafael Kohan as Alfredo
- Fabio Chamorro as Chamorro
- Victoria Fretes as Julieta Ibañez
- David Gerber as Russian
- Hugo Jesus González as Caco Secretary
- Silvio Rodas as Colonel Fernández (Former Minister)
- Calolo Rodriguez as Antonio Quiñonez (Minister)
- Sergio Quiñonez Román as Tembleque
- Antonella Zaldivar as Wife Ibañez
- Luis Zorrilla as Dante's henchman

== Production ==
Principal photography lasted 30 days entirely carried out in Paraguay in cities such as Asunción, Lambaré, Mariano Roque Alonso, Luque, Paraguarí and Ciudad del Este.

== See also ==
- List of submissions to the 96th Academy Awards for Best International Feature Film
- List of Paraguayan submissions for the Academy Award for Best International Feature Film
