= The Apartment (2023 film) =

- Theatrical release poster
- Directed by: Michael Kovich Jr.
- Written by: Michael Kovich Jr.
- Produced by: Bruno Sosa Bofinger; Leticia Fleitas; Michael Kovich Jr. Nicolas Merens; Andrea Quattrocchi
- Starring: Bruno Sosa; Andrea Quattrocchi
- Cinematography: Jerónimo Buman
- Edited by: Michael Kovich Jr.
- Music by: Martin De Lemos
- Production companies: Al Mango; LetiFleitas SdP; Michael Kovich Jr. Films
- Release date: August 3, 2023
- Running time: 87 minutes
- Country: Paraguay
- Language: Spanish
- Budget: $80.000

The Apartment (Spanish: El apartamento) is a 2023 Paraguayan horror film written, directed, co-produced and edited by Michael Kovich Jr. Starring Bruno Sosa and Andrea Quattrocchi accompanied with Fernando Abadie, Roberto Cardozo and Clotilde Cabral. It is about a man who wakes up and has no memory of his last days in his own apartment whose door is covered in chains and padlocks. It premiered on August 3, 2023, in Paraguayan theaters.

== Synopsis ==
A man wakes up disoriented, with little memory of his last days in his own apartment; Soon he finds his door covered in chains and padlocks. After several attempts to struggle, he realizes that he is trapped and has no way out. As the man tries to escape, he mysteriously encounters traces of a dark past that he does not want to confront.

== Cast ==
- Bruno Sosa as Him
- Andrea Quattrocchi as Her
- Fernando Abadie as Janitor
- Roberto Cardozo as Governmental
- Clotilde Cabral as Neighbor

== Production ==
Principal photography began on December 11-12, 2020 and ended 10-11 days later in Asunción, Paraguay.
