= Lima 3.31 =

2021 action film

- Directed by: Marcelo Torcida
- Written by: Marcelo Torcida; Jorge Samson Blaires
- Produced by: Carolina Sandoval; Marcelo Torcida
- Starring: Oliver Kolker; Joel Casco; Matias Miranda; Valeria Solis; José Maldonado; María Belén
- Cinematography: Pablo Bernst; Diego de Garay
- Edited by: Francisco D'Eufemia; Julia Straface
- Music by: Borja Évora
- Distributed by: Global Genesis Group
- Release date: 2021
- Country: Paraguay
- Languages: English; Guarani

Lima 3.31 is a 2021 Paraguayan action film directed and written by Marcelo Torcida. The film stars Oliver Kolker, Joel Casco, Matias Miranda, Valeria Solis, José Maldonado and María Belén.

== Plot ==
In the cheerful Latin America of the 70s an ideological struggle is waged that involves all sectors of society. Dictators and revolutionaries use the kidnapping of people as their preferred methodology to impose their ideas. Valente, the son of a powerful businessman, makes a living working for an insurance company specializing in kidnappings. His mission is to bring the victims to safety.

== Cast ==
- Oliver Kolker as Vicente Valente's father
- Joel Casco as Carlos
- Matias Miranda as Valente
- Valeria Solis as Valente's mother
- José Maldonado as Mendez
- María Belén Fretes as India

== Production ==
In January 2017, the production of the first Paraguayan film shot entirely in English was announced under the title "Eskaton". At the end of October 2020, details of the plot were released and the official title of the film was announced, "Lima 3.31".
