= Orsai =

2019 Paraguayan film

- Film poster
- Directed by: Emiliano Gómez
- Written by: Emiliano Gómez
- Produced by: Rafael Alfaro; Emiliano Gómez; Gabriela Sabaté; Paola Maltese; Carlos Gesino
- Starring: Rafael Alfaro; Paola Maltese; Héctor Silva; Amada Gómez; Renato Gómez; Martín Oviedo; Ximena Ayala; Lucrecia Carrillo; Tomás Arredondo.
- Cinematography: Oscar Ayala
- Edited by: Andrea Gandolfo
- Music by: Derlis A. González
- Production companies: Al Aire Producciones; Central Tres Cine; Maltese Entertainment
- Distributed by: Filmagic Entertainment
- Release date: August 15, 2019
- Country: Paraguay
- Language: Spanish

Orsai is a 2019 Paraguayan comedy film written, co-produced and directed by Emiliano Gómez. It was released on August 15, 2019 by Filmagic Entertainment.

The film stars Rafael Alfaro and Paola Maltese, with Mexican actor Édgar Vivar, and Paraguayan former footballers Ever Hugo Almeida and Carlos Alberto Gamarra as special guest stars.
