= Ana Brun =

Paraguayan actress and lawyer

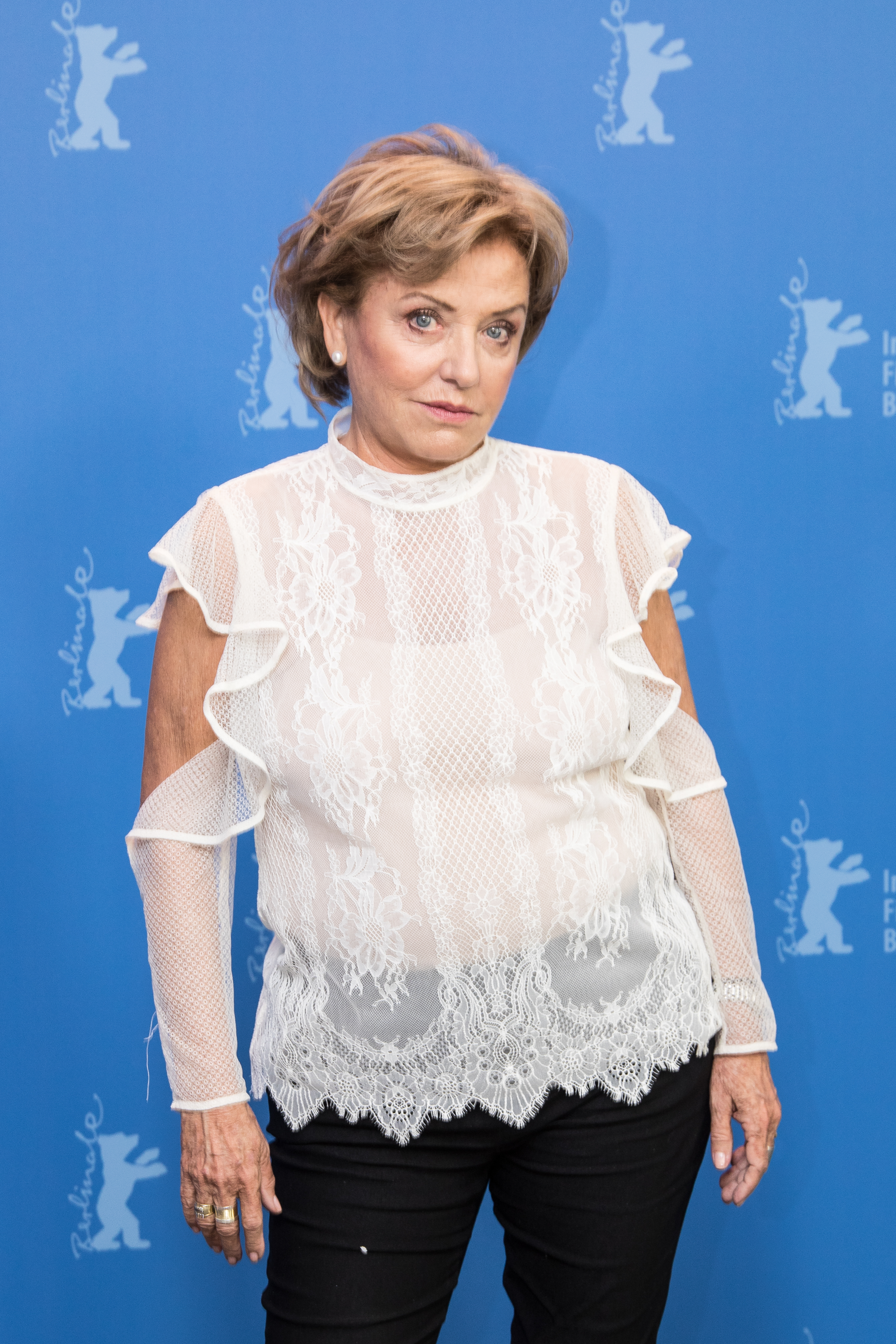
- Born: Ana Patricia Abente Brun
- Occupation: Actress
- Years active: 1970–present

Ana Patricia Abente Brun is a Paraguayan actress and lawyer who made her film debut as Chela in Marcelo Martinessi's 2018 drama The Heiresses, which earned her a Silver Bear for Best Actress at the 68th Berlin International Film Festival.

== Filmography ==
Year	Title	Role	Notes
2018	The Heiresses	Chela	Silver Bear for Best Actress
2021	To Kill the Beast	Aunt Ines	

== Awards and nominations ==
Year	Award	Category	Nominated work	Result	Ref.
2018	Berlin International Film Festival	Best Actress	The Heiresses	Won	
2018	Gramado Film Festival	Latin Film Competition - Best Actress	The Heiresses	Won	
2018	Lima Latin American Film Festival	Best Actress	The Heiresses	Won	
2018	Seattle International Film Festival	Best Actress	The Heiresses	Nominated	
2019	Platino Awards	Best Actress	The Heiresses	Won	
