= Renate Costa =

- Born: May 21, 1981; Asunción
- Died: June 29, 2020 (aged 39); Paris
- Occupation: Film director, film producer

Renate Costa Perdomo (May 21, 1981 – June 29, 2020) was a Paraguayan film director and producer best known for her documentary 108 Cuchillo de Palo (2010).

Renate Costa was born in Asunción, Paraguay. She studied film at the Paraguayan Professional Institute, the Escuela Internacional de Cine y Televisión (EICTV) in San Antonio de los Baños, Cuba, and Pompeu Fabra University in Barcelona, Spain.

108 Cuchillo de Palo (2010) focuses on the mysterious death of her uncle, Rodolfo Costa, during the brutal dictatorship of Alfredo Stroessner. The film reveals Rodolfo's secret life as a gay man and explores the rampant homophobia and persecution of homosexuals in Paraguay. The title refers to the gay blacklists under Stroessner called "108". The film premiered at the Berlin International Film Festival and won Best Documentary at the Guadalajara International Film Festival.

She also directed a number of short films and the 13-episode documentary television series Historias del camino, which aired on the Telefuturo channel. The series told different stories from all over Paraguay. She co-directed the documentary short film Resistente (2011) with Finnish director Salla Sorri, which was the first Paraguayan film to compete at the Venice Film Festival.

Renate Costa died of cancer on 29 June 2020 in Paris.

== Filmography ==
- Asu (short, 2004)
- Historias del camino (television, 13 episodes, 2006)
- Che yvotymi - Mi pequeña flor (short, 2007)
- Guantes blancos (short, 2009).
- 108 Cuchillo de Palo (2010)
- Resistente (short, 2011)
