= 108 Cuchillo de Palo =

- French: Cuchillo de palo
- Directed by: Renate Costa
- Screenplay by: Renate Costa
- Produced by: Marta Andreu; Susana Benito
- Narrated by: Renate Costa
- Cinematography: Carlos Vásquez Méndez
- Edited by: Núria Esquerra; Carlos García
- Production company: Estudi Playtime
- Distributed by: Urban Distribution; Icarus Films
- Release date: February 2010 (Berlin)
- Running time: 93 minutes
- Countries: Paraguay; Spain
- Language: Spanish

108 Cuchillo de Palo (Spanish: Cuchillo de palo) is a Paraguayan-Spanish documentary film, directed by Renate Costa and released in 2010. The film centres on Costa's investigation into the life and death of her uncle Rodolfo, who was one of over 600 gay men scapegoated by the authoritarian government of Alfredo Stroessner for the 1982 kidnapping of Mario Luis Palmieri in Asunción.

== Background ==
The documentary's title' '108 Cuchillo de Palo' translates as '108 wooden knife', references the Spanish saying 'En casa de herrero cuchillo de palo' (in the blacksmith's house, wooden spoon). The number represents the initial number of LGBTQ+ people taken by the police in the 1959 anti-queer/trans raid, and the phrase alludes to the uselessness of a society that cannot protect the individual in it.

The documentary was produced 21 years after the fall of the Paraguayan dictator, Alfredo Stroessner, under whose reign gay men were frequently detained and tortured. From the original '108' LGBTQ+ people that were taken, an ever-expanding list with their names was created, with the 108 names, and then, throughout the years, many more. Renate Costa's uncle, Rodolfo, was one of these men, and the documentary explores the mysterious circumstances of his death in Asunción 15 years before its making. Through the course of the film, Costa interviews queer women and men who had ties to Rodolfo. American film critic Jay Weissberg has noted that these interviews reveal that the “shadow world in which Rodolfo and other gay men lived in Paraguay still exists.” They inhabit a “parallel universe” within Asunción, the existence of which has historically depended on silence and self-censorship. The film also depicts the moral conflict between Renate Costa and her father, Pedro, who “speaks proudly of beating up his brother’s friends in the belief [that] he could keep Rodolfo from acting on his desires” through an evangelistic frame.

Women's Studies scholar Eva Karene Romero notes that 108 / Cuchillo de Palo was the first Paraguayan film to feature queer protagonists. Further, “Cuchillo was the first film to take on the Stroessner dictatorship in an overt, literal way, by shedding light on the regime’s persecution of homosexuals." In order to shed light on the history of state violence against queer people, Costa documented testemonios from victims about the caso Aranda and caso Palmieri. The former refers to an event in 1959 where, following the murder and incineration of the dancer and radio announcer Bernardo Aranda, Stroessner “initiated a witch hunt in which anyone suspected of being a homosexual male was arrested and tortured." This resulted in the circulation of la lista de los 108: a list of 108 gay men who were detained, tortured, and publicly humiliated. The caso Palmieri was a 1982 instance in which, following the kidnapping and murder of fourteen-year-old Mario Luis Palmieri, over six hundred queer people were detained, interrogated, and tortured. Rodolfo Costa was one of these men.

== Distribution ==
The film premiered in February 2010 at the 60th Berlin International Film Festival. It was subsequently screened at the 2010 Cannes Film Festival, where it was in contention for the Queer Palm for best LGBTQ-related film.

The film went into commercial release in France in 2011, and in Spain in 2012.

The film was picked up for U.S. distribution by Icarus, and saw a limited release in 2013.

== Awards ==
It was the winner of the Prix Caméra au poing and the Prix Première Caméra at the 2010 Montreal International Documentary Festival.
